= List of requisitioned trawlers of the Royal Navy (WWII) =

This is a list of civilian trawlers requisitioned by the Royal Navy for use in World War II. HMT stands for "His Majesty's Trawler".

Requisitioned trawlers, whalers and drifters;

== A ==
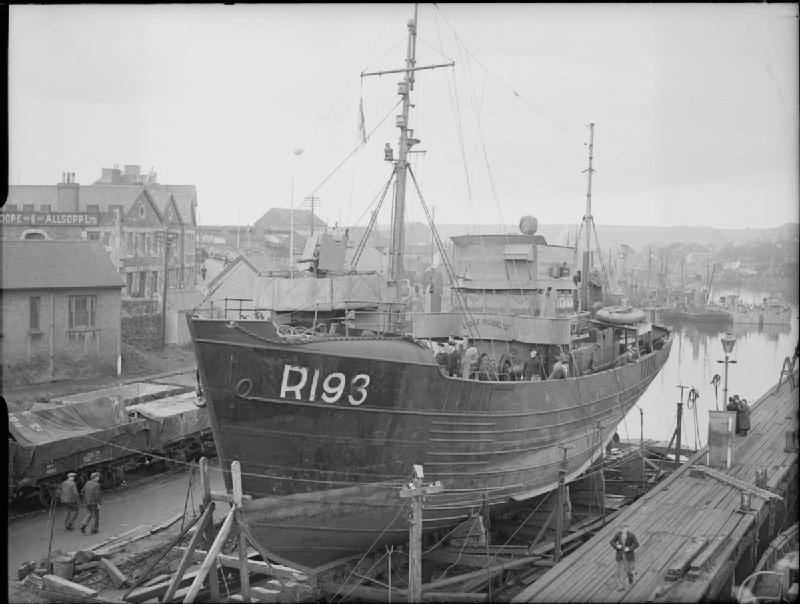
HMT Andre Monique in dry dock on a slipway near Victoria Bridge, Milford Haven

| Ship designation | Requisitioned | Fate |
|---|---|---|
| HMT Aberdour | Apr 1940 | Balloon barrage vessel, returned 1946 |
| HMT Abiding Star | May 1940 | Mine recovery vessel, de-gaussing, returned 1946 |
| HMT Abronia | Nov 1939 | Minesweeper, scrapped 1947 |
| HMT Accord | Aug 1939 | Harbour service, sold 1946 |
| HMT Accumulator | 1940 | Harbour service, returned Oct 1940 |
| HMT Achievable | Nov 1939 | Mine recovery vessel, returned Jan 1946 |
| HMT Achroite | Aug 1939 | Minesweeper, returned 1945 |
| HMT Acorn | Nov 1939 | Harbour service, returned 1946 |
| HMT Acquire | 1940 | Balloon barrage vessel, returned 1945 |
| HMT Acquisition | Mar 1940 | Submarine tender, mobile wiping unit, returned 1944 |
| HMT Acrasia | 1940 | Dan layer, auxiliary patrol, returned 1946 |
| HMT Adam | Feb 1940 | Minesweeper, sold 1944 |
| HMT Adele | Nov 1939 | Harbour service, returned 1946 |
| HMT Admiral Sir John Lawford | Aug 1939 | Minesweeper, wreck dispersal vessel, returned Jan 1946 |
| HMT Admire | Mar 1940 | Harbour service, returned Jan 1946 |
| HMT Adoration | 1940 | Exam, returned 1945 |
| HMT Adriatic | Oct 1940 | Auxiliary patrol, returned Jun 1945 |
| HMT Advisable | Nov 1939 | Minesweeper, returned 1945 |
| HMT Africana | Sep 1939 | Minesweeper, returned Apr 1947 |
| HMT Afterglow | Nov 1939 | Minesweeper, returned Aug 1944 |
| HMT Agnes Bunyan | Jun 1940 | Boom tender, returned Dec 1940 |
| HMT Agnes Gardner | 1941 | Harbour service, returned 1945 |
| HMT Agnes Nutten | Jun 1940 | Auxiliary patrol, returned Jan 1946 |
| HMT Agnes Wetherly | Jun 1940 | Auxiliary patrol, returned Dec 19458 |
| HMT Agnes Wickfield | Nov 1939 | Minesweeper, returned Dec 1945 |
| HMT Aiglon | Jul 1940 | Minesweeper, returned Jul 1946 |
| HMT Akita | Aug 1939 | Minesweeper, returned Oct 1945 |
| HMT Akranes | Aug 1939 | Minesweeper, bombed in Bridlington Bay 4 Jul 1941 |
| HMT Alafoss | Aug 1939 | Minesweeper, sold 1946 |
| HMT Alberic | 1940 | Minesweeper, sunk in collision with St. Albans off Scapa 3 May 1941 |
| HMT Albert Hulett | Feb 1941 | Minesweeper, Langlaagte 1942, returned Apr 1946 |
| HMT Alcmaria | Dec 1939 | Minesweeper, Royal Norwegian Navy 1940 |
| HMT Alcor | Dec 1939 | Minesweeper, returned 1945 |
| HMT Alex Hastie | Oct 1939 | Auxiliary patrol, returned Feb 1940 |
| HMT Alex Watts | 1940 | Torpedo recovery vessel, returned 1945 |
| HMT Alexandre Gabrielle | Jul 1940 | Balloon barrage vessel, returned Jul 1944 |
| HMT Alexander Scott | 1939 | Minesweeper, Dan layer, returned 1945 |
| HMT Alexandrite | 1939 | Minesweeper, returned Dec 1945 |
| HMT Alfie Cam | Jun 1940 | Minesweeper, sold 1944 |
| HMT Alfredian | Dec 1939 | Auxiliary patrol, returned 1946 |
| HMT Algoa Bay | Oct 1939 | Minesweeper, returned Dec 1940 |
| HMT Alida | 1940 | Boom defence vessel, returned 1945 |
| HMT All Hallows | 1944 | Esso, returned 1945 |
| HMT Allersie | 1940 | Balloon barrage vessel, returned 1944 |
| HMT Allochy | 1941 | Hospital drifter, returned 1945 |
| HMT Alma | 1943 | Minesweeper Royal Netherlands Navy, returned 1945 |
| HMT Almandine | Aug 1939 | Minesweeper, sold Dec 1945 |
| HMT Alouette | 1939 | Anti-submarine, sunk by U-552 off Portugal 19 Sep 1942 |
| HMT Alsey | 1940 | Motor launch, returned 1945 |
| HMT Altruist | Jan 1941 | Harbour services, returned 1944 |
| HMT Alvis | May 1940 | Auxiliary patrol, Minesweeper, returned Mar 1945 |
| HMT Amalia | Dec 1939 | Minesweeper, returned Mar 1945 |
| HMT Amaranthe | 1942 | Mine watcher, returned 1945 |
| HMT Ambition | 1944 | Esso, returned 1945 |
| HMT Ambrose | Jul 1940 | Anti-submarine, returned Mar 1946 |
| HMT Amiable | 1940 | Mobile wiping unit, returned 1945 |
| HMT Ampulla | 1940 | Auxiliary patrol, Minesweeper, sold 1946 |
| HMT Amroath Castle | 1940 | Auxiliary patrol, Minesweeper, returned 1945 |
| HMT A.N. 2 | Oct 1940 | Auxiliary patrol, Mined off Falmouth 8 Nov 1940 |
| HMT Ancre Esperance | 1940 | Auxiliary patrol, returned Aug 1946 |
| HMT Andanes | Oct 1940 | Boom defence vessel, returned 1946 |
| HMT Andradite | Aug 1939 | Minesweeper, returned Jan 1946 |
| HMT Andre Et Louise | Jul 1940 | Minesweeper, returned Apr 1945 |
| HMT Andre-Marcel | Aug 1940 | Auxiliary patrol, KBV, returned 1945 |
| HMT Andre Monique | Jul 1940 | Auxiliary patrol, returned 1945 |
| HMT Andronie-Camiel | Jul 1940 | Auxiliary patrol, ferry service, returned 1945 |
| HMT Andyk | 1941 | Minesweeper, returned Jan 1946 |
| HMT Angele Marie | Jul 1940 | Minesweeper, returned Jan 1946 |
| HMT Angle | 1939 | Auxiliary service, returned Oct 1945 |
| HMT Animate | 1941 | Harbour service, returned 1946 |
| HMT Animation | 1940 | Balloon barrage vessel, torpedo recovery vessel, returned 1945 |
| HMT Ann Melville | Feb 1940 | Minesweeper, Esso, returned Oct 1944 |
| HMT Annabelle | Dec 1939 | Auxiliary patrol, balloon barrage vessel, returned Dec 1944 |
| HMT Anne-Gaston | Jul 1940 | Examination service, returned Jun 1945 |
| HMT Anne Marie | 1940 | Auxiliary patrol, lost 20 Jan 1942 |
| HMT Annie | Jul 1940 | Auxiliary patrol, returned Feb 1946 |
| HMT Anson | Oct 1939 | Auxiliary patrol |
| HMT Anticyclone | Mar 1941 | De-gaussing vessel, returned Jul 1945 |
| HMT Antioche II | Jul 1940 | Minesweeper, returned 1945 |
| HMT Appletree | 1940 | aircraft observation, lost in collision at Oban 15 Oct 1940 |
| HMT Aquamarine | Aug 1939 | Armed boarding vessel, anti-submarine, returned 1944 |
| HMT Arab | 1939 | Anti-submarine, returned 1945 |
| HMT Arabesque | Dec 1939 | Auxiliary patrol, balloon barrage vessel, Esso, returned Sep 1944 |
| HMT Aracari | Jan 1943 | Esso, wrecked north of Sicily 3 Oct 1943 |
| HMT Aragonite | Aug 1939 | Minesweeper, Mined off Deal 22 Nov 1939 |
| HMT Arcady | Dec 1939 | Minesweeper, returned Jun 1945 |
| HMT Arcanes | Sep 1939 | Minesweeper |
| HMT Archimedes | Apr 1940 | Balloon barrage vessel, returned Dec 1944 |
| HMT Arctic Explorer | Aug 1939 | Anti-submarine United States Navy, sold 1945 |
| HMT Arctic Hunter | Aug 1939 | Minesweeper, returned May 1945 |
| HMT Arctic Pioneer | Sep 1939 | Anti-submarine, unknown cause off Portsmouth 27 May 1942 |
| HMT Arctic Ranger | Aug 1939 | Anti-Submarine, sold 1946 |
| HMT Arctic Trapper | Jun 1940 | Auxiliary patrol, bombed off Ramsgate 3 Feb 1941 |
| HMT Argo | Jul 1940 | Minesweeper, returned Feb 1946 |
| HMT Argyllshire | Sep 1939 | Anti-submarine, torpedoed by E-boat off Dunkirk 1 Jun 1940 |
| HMT Aristea | Dec 1939 | Minesweeper, returned Dec 1944 |
| HMT Arkwright | Aug 1939 | Minesweeper, sold Dec 1945 |
| HMT Arlette | Aug 1939 | Examination services, returned Sep 1946 |
| HMT Arley | Aug 1939 | Minesweeper, Mined North Sea 3 Feb 1945 |
| HMT Arleux | 1939 | Minesweeper, boom gate vessel, returned 1946 |
| HMT Armana | Jun 1940 | Auxiliary patrol, Minesweeper, Dan layer, returned Nov 1945 |
| HMT Arnold Bennett | Jun 1940 | Minesweeper, returned Jul 1945 |
| HMT Arora | Jun 1940 | Boom defence vessel, returned Aug 1940 |
| HMT Arras | 1939 | Minesweeper, returned Aug 1946 |
| HMT Arrest | Jun 1940 | Boom defence vessel, returned Jul 1945 |
| HMT Arsenal | Aug 1939 | Anti-submarine, lost in collision with Burza off the Clyde 16 Nov 1940 |
| HMT Artegal | Nov 1939 | Minesweeper, returned Mar 1945 |
| HMT Arthur Cavanagh | Aug 1939 | Minesweeper, sold Jan 1946 |
| HMT Arum | Jan 1940 | Minesweeper, returned Oct 1944 |
| HMT Asama | Aug 1939 | Minesweeper, bombed at Plymouth 21 Mar 1941 |
| HMT Ascona | Nov 1939 | Minesweeper, returned Nov 1945 |
| HMT Asie | Sep 1940 | Anti-submarine, returned Apr 1946 |
| HMT Aston Villa | Sep 1939 | Anti-submarine, bombed off Norway 3 May 1940 |
| HMT Astros | Dec 1939 | Boom defence vessel, returned 1946 |
| HMT Athelston | Nov 1939 | Auxiliary patrol, returned Jan 1940 |
| HMT Athenian | Nov 1939 | Minesweeper, Esso, returned Sep 1946 |
| HMT Atlantic | Jun 1940 | Boom defence vessel, returned Oct 1940 |
| HMT Atmosphere | Dec 1940 | Minesweeper, returned Dec 1945 |
| HMT Aurora II | Jun 1940 | Minesweeper, bombed at Tobruk 25 May 1941 |
| HMT Aurilia | Nov 1939 | Minesweeper, returned Aug 1946 |
| HMT Available | Nov 1939 | Auxiliary patrol, returned Jan 1946 |
| HMT Avalanche | Nov 1939 | Minesweeper, Balloon barrage vessel, returned 1945 |
| HMT Avalon | 1940 | Auxiliary patrol, Adonis Jun 1941, lost 15 Apr 1943 |
| HMT Avanturine | Oct 1939 | Minesweeper, torpedoed by E-boat off Beachy Head 1 Dec 1943 |
| HMT Avola | Aug 1939 | Minesweeper, returned Apr 1946 |
| HMT Avon | May 1940 | Auxiliary patrol, returned Dec 1941 |
| HMT Avona | Aug 1939 | Minesweeper |
| HMT Avondee | Mar 1944 | Esso, returned Oct 1944 |
| HMT Avonglen | Aug 1939 | Exam hospital trawler, returned Aug 1946 |
| HMT Avonstream | Sep 1939 | Minesweeper, returned Jul 1945 |
| HMT Avonwater | Sep 1939 | Boom defence vessel, returned May 1946 |
| HMT Ayrshire | Sep 1939 | Anti-submarine, returned Oct 1945 |

== B ==
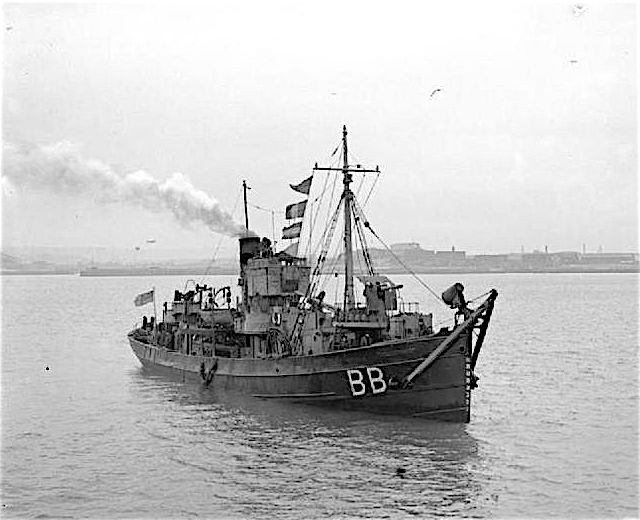
HMT Bervie Braes FL1886

| Ship designation | Requisitioned | Fate |
|---|---|---|
| HMT Babiana | Sep 1939 | Minesweeper, returned Dec 1944 |
| HMT Badinage | 1940 | Minesweeper, returned 1945 |
| HMT Bahram | 1940 | Harbour defence patrol craft, mined off the Humber 3 Apr 1941 |
| HMT Bandolero | Aug 1939 | Anti-submarine, lost in collision with Waterhen off Sollum 30 Dec 1940 |
| HMT Banneret | Sep 1939 | Harbour service, returned 1944 |
| HMT Banshee | Nov 1939 | Minesweeper, returned Jan 1946 |
| HMT Barbados | Oct 1939 | Auxiliary patrol, returned 1945 |
| HMT Barbara Robb | Sep 1939 | Boom defence vessel, returned Dec 1944 |
| HMT Barbara Robertson | 1939 | Auxiliary patrol, sunk by U-30 gunfire off the Hebrides 23 Dec 1939 |
| HMT Barbe Auge | 1940 | Mine layer tender, returned 1945 |
| HMT Baresness | Feb 1940 | Balloon barrage vessel, Esso, returned Dec 1944 |
| HMT Basile Georges | Aug 1940 | Harbour services, returned Nov 1945 |
| HMT Basuto | Jan 1940 | Boom defence vessel, returned Jan 1946 |
| HMT Beaulne Verneuil | Jul 1940 | Boom gate vessel, returned Mar 1946 |
| HMT Beathwood | Nov 1939 | Auxiliary patrol, returned Jan 1940, lost 11 Sep 1940 |
| HMT Beaumaris Castle | Feb 1940 | Minesweeper, returned Nov 1945 |
| HMT Beaver | Nov 1939 | Minesweeper, sunk by Japanese submarine off Ceylon 5 Apr 1942 |
| HMT Bedlington | Apr 1940 | Anti-submarine to Ministry of War Transport Sep 1945 |
| HMT Bedfordshire | Aug 1939 | Anti-submarine with US Navy, sunk by German submarine U-558 off Cape Lookout 11 May 1942 |
| HMT Belldock | Nov 1939 | Auxiliary patrol, returned 1940 |
| HMT Belle O'Moray | Mar 1940 | Harbour service, returned Feb 1946 |
| HMT Belton | Aug 1939 | Exam, returned Mar 1946 |
| HMT Belvoir Castle | 1940 | Balloon barrage vessel, returned 1944 |
| HMT Ben and Lucy | Oct 1939 | Minesweeper, returned 1945 |
| HMT Ben Ardna | Aug 1939 | Exam, lost in collision off the Tyne 12 May 1942 |
| HMT Ben Barvas | Jun 1940 | Auxiliary patrol, returned Sep 1940 |
| HMT Ben Bheulah | Aug 1939 | Minesweeper, returned Oct 1945 |
| HMT Ben Bhrackie | Mar 1940 | Minesweeper, returned Dec 1945 |
| HMT Ben Breac | Jun 1940 | Minesweeper, returned Dec 1945 |
| HMT Ben Dearg | Aug 1939 | Minesweeper, returned Jun 1946 |
| HMT Ben Earn | Feb 1940 | Minesweeper, returned Feb 1946 |
| HMT Ben Gairn | Jun 1940 | Minesweeper, bombed at Lowestoft 4 May 1941 |
| HMT Ben Glas | Nov 1939 | Minesweeper, lost 4 May 1941 |
| HMT Ben Gulvain | Aug 1939 | Auxiliary patrol, Minesweeper, Esso, returned Oct 1944 |
| HMT Ben Heilem | Nov 1939 | Minesweeper, returned Aug 1946 |
| HMT Ben Idris | Aug 1939 | Minesweeper, returned Apr 1946 |
| HMT Ben Meidie | Jan 1940 | Exam, Minesweeper, returned Sep 1945 |
| HMT Ben Rossal | Sep 1939 | Minesweeper, returned Mar 1946 |
| HMT Ben Roy | Feb 1940 | Boom defence vessel, returned Mar 1946 |
| HMT Ben Tarbert | Jun 1940 | Boom defence vessel, store carrier, returned Feb 1945 |
| HMT Ben Torc | Nov 1939 | Minesweeper, returned Sep 1946 |
| HMT Ben Urie | Feb 1940 | Minesweeper, returned Dec 1945 |
| HMT Benachie | Oct 1939 | Minesweeper, submarine tender, returned 1946 |
| HMT Bengal | Nov 1939 | Auxiliary patrol, returned Jan 1940 |
| HMT Bengali | Aug 1939 | Anti-submarine, lost 5 Dec 1942 |
| HMT Benjamin Coleman | Nov 1939 | Auxiliary patrol, Esso, returned Sep 1945 |
| HMT Benoni | May 1942 | Minesweeper, returned Apr 1946 |
| HMT Benvolio | Sep 1939 | Minesweeper, mined off the Humber 23 Feb 1940 |
| HMT Berenga | Nov 1939 | Balloon barrage vessel, returned Sep 1945 |
| HMT Berkshire | Oct 1939 | Anti-submarine, returned Nov 1945 |
| HMT Bernadette | Jul 1940 | Boom defence vessel, returned Dec 1945 |
| HMT Bernard Shaw | Sep 1939 | Minesweeper, returned Sep 1945 |
| HMT Bertha Lina | Jul 1940 | Balloon barrage vessel, tender, returned Feb 1946 |
| HMT Beru | Oct 1939 | Auxiliary patrol, returned Dec 1939 |
| HMT Bervie Braes | Nov 1939 | Auxiliary patrol, Minesweeper, Esso, returned Oct 1944 |
| HMT Beryl II | Mar 1940 | Harbour service, returned Mar 1946 |
| HMT Beryl II | Sep 1939 | Minesweeper, Boom gate vessel, returned 1945 |
| HMT Betsy Slater | 1940 | Balloon barrage vessel, returned 1945 |
| HMT Betty Bodie | Aug 1939 | Exam, returned Jun 1946 |
| HMT Betty Inglis | Dec 1939 | Minesweeper, harbour service, returned Mar 1946 |
| HMT Bever | Oct 1941 | Minesweeper, mined off Piraeus 30 Nov 1944 |
| HMT Billow | 1941 | Minesweeper, returned 1945 |
| HMT Bilsdean | Feb 1940 | Minesweeper, returned Nov 1945 |
| HMT Bjerk | Sep 1940 | Minesweeper, returned Oct 1945 |
| HMT Blaauwberg | Dec 1940 | Anti-Submarine, returned May 1946 |
| HMT Blackburn Rovers | Aug 1939 | Anti-submarine, lost probably by RN mine, North Sea 2 Jun 1940 |
| HMT Blackfly | Aug 1939 | Anti-submarine, sold Mar 1946 |
| HMT Blanche Madeleine | Aug 1940 | Harbour service, returned 1945 |
| HMT Blanche Marguerite | Aug 1940 | Auxiliary patrol, returned Nov 1945 |
| HMT Blia | 1941 | Lost 11 Nov 1941 |
| HMT Blighty | 1940 | Minesweeper, Polish Podole 1944 |
| HMT Blizzard | May 1941 | Minesweeper, returned Jul 1945 |
| HMT Blomvlei | Mar 1940 | Anti-submarine, returned Mar 1945 |
| HMT Blue Haze | May 1940 | Torpedo recovery vessel, returned Feb 1946 |
| HMT Blue Tit | 1940 | Observation Motor launch, returned Nov 1945 |
| HMT Bluff | Sep 1939 | Minesweeper, returned Dec 1944 |
| HMT Boarhound | Aug 1940 | Anti-submarine, returned 1945 |
| HMT Bodo | 1940 | Minesweeper; mined off east coast Scotland 4 Jan 1943 |
| HMT Boksburg | Oct 1940 | Minesweeper, returned Jul 1946 |
| HMT Bombay | Oct 1939 | Auxiliary patrol, returned Jan 1940, lost 6 Aug 1942 |
| HMT Bona | Apr 1944 | Esso, returned Nov 1944 |
| HMT Borealis | May 1941 | Minesweeper, returned Oct 1945 |
| HMT Border King | Aug 1939 | Harbour service, returned Oct 1945 |
| HMT Bortind | 1940 | Minesweeper, returned 1946 |
| HMT Botanic | Aug 1939 | Minesweeper, bombed in the North Sea 18 Feb 1942 |
| HMT Bounteous | 1942 | Exam, returned 1946 |
| HMT Bounteous | 1941 | Harbour service, returned 1946 |
| HMT Bouvet 1 | Mar 1940 | Minesweeper, returned 1945 |
| HMT Bouvet 2 | Mar 1940 | Minesweeper returned Apr 1946 |
| HMT Bouvet 3 | Mar 1940 | Minesweeper Apr 1946 |
| HMT Bouvet 4 | Mar 1940 | Minesweeper, returned Jun 1946 |
| HMT Bow Wave | Nov 1940 | Torpedo recovery vessel, returned May 1946 |
| HMT Boy Alan | Nov 1939 | Minesweeper, lost in collision, Thames Estuary 10 Feb 1941 |
| HMT Boy Alex | Nov 1939 | Minesweeper, returned 1945 |
| HMT Boy Andrew | 1940 | Auxiliary patrol, lost in collision, Firth of Forth 9 Nov 1941 |
| HMT Boy Davie | 1941 | De-gaussing, returned 1944 |
| HMT Boy Jermyn | Oct 1939 | Auxiliary patrol, returned Dec 1939 |
| HMT Boy John | Dec 1939 | Minesweeper, returned Jul 1945 |
| HMT Boy Philip | Oct 1939 | Minesweeper, W.D. Aug 1943 |
| HMT Boy Ray | Jun 1940 | Water carrier, returned 1946 |
| HMT Boy Roy | Nov 1939 | Flare drifter, bombed at Dunkirk 28 May 1940 |
| HMT Boy Scout | Nov 1939 | Balloon barrage vessel, returned Dec 1944 |
| HMT Brabant | Aug 1939 | Minesweeper, returned Dec 1945 |
| HMT Brackendale | Aug 1939 | De-gaussing, returned 1946 |
| HMT Bracondene | Aug 1940 | Minesweeper Aug 1946 |
| HMT Braconheath | Feb 1940 | Dan layer, returned 1945 |
| HMT Braconhill | Nov 1939 | Exam, returned Jul 1945 |
| HMT Braconlynn | Nov 1939 | Auxiliary patrol, returned Jan 1940 |
| HMT Braconmoor | Aug 1939 | Minesweeper, returned Aug 1946 |
| HMT Braconburn | 1944 | To be block ship, lost in collision with LeBaron Russell Briggs off Bell Rock 30 Jul 1944 |
| HMT Bradman | Aug 1939 | Anti-submarine, bombed off Norway 25 Apr 1940 |
| HMT Brae Flett | Jan 1942 | Harbour service, lost (unknown cause?) 29 Sep 1943 |
| HMT Braes Flett | Jul 1940 | Water carrier, returned 1946 |
| HMT Braes O'Mar | Mar 1944 | Esso, returned Nov 1944 |
| HMT Braemar | Dec 1939 | Anti-submarine, returned 1945 |
| HMT Brakvlei | Jul 1940 | Minesweeper, returned Jun 1946 |
| HMT Brakpan | Apr 1943 | Minesweeper, returned Nov 1946 |
| HMT Branch | 1939 | Anti-submarine, returned 1945 |
| HMT Bransfield | Apr 1943 | Salvage vessel, returned Jul 1946 |
| HMT Bras D'Or | Sep 1939 | Minesweeper, foundered, Gulf of Saint Lawrence 19 Oct 1940 |
| HMT Brecon castle | Aug 1939 | Minesweeper, returned Dec 1945 |
| HMT Breme | Jul 1940 | Harbour service, returned Dec 1945 |
| HMT Breeze | Jul 1941 | Auxiliary patrol, sold Mar 1946 |
| HMT Bretwalda | 1940 | Anti-submarine, sold 1947 |
| HMT Brevik | Jan 1942 | Minesweeper, returned 1946 |
| HMT Brighton O'The North | Nov 1939 | Examination service, returned Sep 1945 |
| HMT Brimnes | Sep 1939 | Anti-submarine, sold 1945 |
| HMT British | Aug 1939 | Minesweeper, returned Dec 1945 |
| HMT British Crown | Sep 1939 | Mine recovery vessel, returned 1945 |
| HMT British Guiana | Nov 1939 | Anti-submarine, returned Mar 1946 |
| HMT British Honduras | Dec 1939 | Anti-submarine, returned Jan 1946 |
| HMT Broadland | 1939 | Auxiliary patrol, foundered, North Atlantic 6 Jun 1945 |
| HMT Brock | Aug 1939 | Minesweeper, sold 1945 |
| HMT Brontes | Aug 1939 | Anti-submarine, sold 1945 |
| HMT Bruinsvisch | Jul 1940 | Minesweeper, Esso, returned 1946 |
| HMT B.T.B | Nov 1939 | Minesweeper, returned Jan 1946 |
| HMT Bucephalus | 1944 | Esso, returned 1945 |
| HMT Bucentaur | Nov 1939 | Auxiliary patrol, returned Jan 1940 |
| HMT Buchans | Jul 1940 | Auxiliary patrol, returned Aug 1946 |
| HMT Buckingham | Aug 1939 | Minesweeper, Boom defence vessel, returned Dec 1945 |
| HMT Buckler | 1942 | Harbour service, returned Mar 1946 |
| HMT Burke | Sep 1939 | Minesweeper, wreck dispersal vessel, returned Jan 1946 |
| HMT Burnbanks | Feb 1940 | Dan layer, sold 1946 |
| HMT Burnhaven | Aug 1939 | Harbour service, returned 1945 |
| HMT Busen 3 | Dec 1940 | Minesweeper, Icicle 1941, returned Jan, 1946 |
| HMT Busen 7 | 1940 | Minesweeper, Silhouette 1941, Royal Norwegian Navy, Royal Hellenic Navy Acheloos 1943, returned Feb 1947 |
| HMT Busen 11 | 1940 | Minesweeper, Snowdrift 1941, Royal Norwegian Navy 1941, Royal Hellenic Navy Thasos 1943 |
| HMT Bush | 1940 | Auxiliary patrol, returned Sep 1946 |
| HMT Byng | Oct 1939 | Boom defence vessel, Balloon barrage vessel, returned 1946 |

== C ==
| Ship designation | Requisitioned | Fate |
|---|---|---|
| HMT C & A | Feb 1940 | Harbour service, returned Mar 1946 |
| HMT Cadella | Oct 1939 | Boom defence vessel, returned 1946 |
| HMT Cadorna | May 1940 | Minesweeper, returned May 1945 |
| HMT Caerphilly Castle | Aug 1939 | Minesweeper, sold Jan 1940, lost 27 Jan 1941 |
| HMT Caldy | Dec 1939 | Minesweeper, returned Jan 1940 |
| HMT Caliban | Dec 1939 | Boom defence vessel, sold Dec 1946 |
| HMT Calliopsis | 1941 | Minesweeper, returned Jan 1940 |
| HMT Calm | 1940 | Harbour service, returned 1945 |
| HMT Caliph | Dec 1939 | Minesweeper, returned 1945 |
| HMT Calverton | Nov 1939 | Minesweeper, mined off the Humber 29 Nov 1940 |
| HMT Calvi | Sep 1939 | Minesweeper, bombed off Dunkirk 29 May 1940 |
| HMT Calvinia | Jan 1940 | Minesweeper, returned Dec 1945 |
| HMT Cambrian | Sep 1939 | Boom defence vessel, mined off Spithead 30 May 1940 |
| HMT Cambridgeshire | Aug 1939 | Anti-submarine, sold 1945 |
| HMT Campina | 1939 | Auxiliary patrol, mined off Holyhead 22 Jul 1940 |
| HMT Canadian Prince | Sep 1939 | Anti-submarine, French La Bonoise 1939, scrapped 1945 |
| HMT Cap D'Antifer | 1940 | Minesweeper, torpedoed by E-boat off the Humber 13 Feb 1944 |
| HMT Cap Ferrat | 1940 | Minesweeper, returned 1945 |
| HMT Cape Argona | Aug 1939 | Anti-submarine, sold 1945 |
| HMT Cape Barracouta | Aug 1939 | Auxiliary patrol, Minesweeper, returned Jan 1946 |
| HMT Cape Chelyuskin | Aug 1939 | Anti-submarine, bombed in Norway 29 Apr 1940 |
| HMT Cape Comorin | Aug 1939 | Anti-submarine, sold 1945 |
| HMT Cape Finisterre | 1940 | Anti submarine, bombed out in North Sea 2 Aug 1940 |
| HMT Cape Mariato | Jun 1940 | Anti-submarine, returned Dec 1945 |
| HMT Cape Melville | Aug 1939 | Minesweeper, returned Aug 1945 |
| HMT Cape Nyemetski | Aug 1939 | Minesweeper, returned Sep 1945 |
| HMT Cape Palliser | Sep 1939 | Anti-submarine, returned Sep 1945 |
| HMT Cape Passaro | Sep 1939 | Anti-submarine, bombed in Norway 21 May 1940 |
| HMT Cape Portland | Sep 1939 | Anti-submarine, armed boarding vessel, Portuguese P.5 1943–44, returned 1945 |
| HMT Cape Siretoko | Sep 1939 | Anti-submarine, bombed in Norway 29 Apr 1940 |
| HMT Cape Spartel | Aug 1939 | Minesweeper, bombed out in North Sea 2 Feb 1942 |
| HMT Cape Trafalgar | May 1940 | Auxiliary patrol, Boom defence vessel, sold Jan 1947 |
| HMT Cape Warwick | Aug 1939 | Anti-submarine, United States Navy, sold Feb 1946 |
| HMT Caporal Peugeot | 1940 | Auxiliary patrol, returned 1945 |
| HMT Caprice | 1940 | Exam, CAPRICORN 1943, returned Jul 1946 |
| HMT Capricornus | Nov 1939 | Auxiliary patrol, Minesweeper, mined off Milford Haven 7 Oct 1940 |
| HMT Capstone | Jun 1940 | Auxiliary patrol, Minesweeper, returned Oct 1945 |
| HMT Carbineer II | May 1940 | Auxiliary patrol, Boom defence vessel, returned Jul 1946 |
| HMT Cardiff Castle | Aug 1939 | Minesweeper, returned Jan 1946 |
| HMT Carency | 1940 | Anti-submarine, exam, sold Feb 1947 |
| HMT Carisbrooke | Aug 1939 | Minesweeper, sold 1946 |
| HMT Caroline | 1940 | Minesweeper, lost 28 Apr 1941 |
| HMT Carry On | Dec 1939 | Balloon barrage vessel, mined off Sheerness 17 Dec 1940 |
| HMT Cassiopeia | Feb 1940 | Hospital drifter, returned 1945 |
| HMT Castelnau | Aug 1940 | Anti-submarine, returned Feb 1946 |
| HMT Castle Bay | Nov 1939 | Minesweeper, returned Jul 1946 |
| HMT Castle Stuart | 1941 | Harbour service, returned 1945 |
| HMT Castleton | Nov 1939 | Auxiliary patrol, returned Jan 1940, lost 28 Jun 1940 |
| HMT Caswell | Feb 1940 | Minesweeper, returned Jul 1946 |
| HMT Catherine | 1939 | Auxiliary patrol, foundered off Scapa 8 Jun 1942 |
| HMT Caulonia | 1939 | Auxiliary patrol, Minesweeper, wrecked in Rye Bay 31 Mar 1943 |
| HMT Cayrian | Nov 1939 | Minesweeper, returned Dec 1945 |
| HMT Cayton Wyke | Aug 1939 | Anti-submarine, torpedoed by E-boat off Dover 8 Jul 1940 |
| HMT Cedarberg | Mar 1941 | Anti-submarine, returned May 1946 |
| HMT Cedric | Nov 1939 | Auxiliary patrol, Minesweeper, Balloon barrage vessel, returned 1945 |
| HMT Celtia | Nov 1939 | Auxiliary patrol, returned 1940 |
| HMT Cerisio | Sep 1939 | Minesweeper, sold 1945 |
| HMT Cevic | 1943 | Fuel carrier, water carrier, returned Aug 1944 |
| HMT Ceylonite | Apr 1940 | Minesweeper, returned 1946 |
| HMT Chalcedony | Aug 1939 | Auxiliary patrol, Minesweeper, sold 1945 |
| HMT Charde | Nov 1939 | Minesweeper, lost in collision off Portsmouth 21 Jun 1940 |
| HMT Chandos | Nov 1939 | Auxiliary patrol, returned Jan 1940 |
| HMT Charles Boyes | Sep 1939 | Minesweeper, mined off the east coast 25 May 1940 |
| HMT Charles Denise | 1940 | Balloon barrage vessel, returned 1945 |
| HMT Charles Doran | 1940 | Minesweeper, returned Nov 1945 |
| HMT Charles Henri | Jul 1940 | Auxiliary patrol, returned Sep 1945 |
| HMT Charles Vaillant | Jul 1940 | Minesweeper returned Mar 1946 |
| HMT Chasse Marie | Jul 1940 | Minesweeper, returned Mar 1946 |
| HMT Chassiron | Sep 1939 | Minesweeper, returned Aug 1945 |
| HMT Chiltern | Jun 1940 | Auxiliary patrol, returned 1945 |
| HMT Choice | 1944 | Esso, foundered off Normandy 25 Aug 1944 |
| HMT Chorley | Jan 1940 | Boom defence vessel, foundered off Start Point 25 Apr 1942 |
| HMT Christania T Purdy | 1939 | Auxiliary patrol, Balloon barrage vessel, returned 1945 |
| HMT Christine Rose | 1940 | Exam, wrecked, coast of Argyll 10 Sep 1941 |
| HMT Chrysea | Apr 1940 | Balloon barrage vessel, returned Jan 1945 |
| HMT Chrysolite | Aug 1940 | Minesweeper, returned Jan 1946 |
| HMT Citron | Jan 1940 | Balloon barrage vessel, returned Aug 1944 |
| HMT City of Aberdeen | Dec 1939 | Auxiliary patrol, returned Jan 1940 |
| HMT Claesje | 1940 | Minesweeper, returned 1945 |
| HMT Claire | Nov 1939 | Auxiliary patrol, returned Feb 1940 |
| HMT Clan Mackay | 1939 | Dan layer, returned 1945 |
| HMT Clara Simonne | Jul 1940 | Auxiliary patrol, returned Nov 1945 |
| HMT Clara Sutton | 1940 | Tender, returned 1945 |
| HMT Claribelle | 1941 | Minesweeper, returned 1945 |
| HMT Clarice | 1940 | Harbour service, returned 1945 |
| HMT Clarinet | Jan 1940 | Boom defence vessel, returned 1946 |
| HMT Cleon | May 1940 | Balloon barrage vessel, returned 1945 |
| HMT Clevella | Sep 1939 | Minesweeper, returned May 1946 |
| HMT Clifton | Nov 1939 | Minesweeper, returned Mar 1946 |
| HMT Clotilde | Feb 1940 | Minesweeper, returned Dec 1945 |
| HMT Cloudarch | Oct 1942 | Harbour services, returned Jun 1943 |
| HMT Cloughstone | Dec 1940 | Balloon barrage vessel, returned Apr 1945 |
| HMT Cloughton Wyke | Jun 1940 | Auxiliary patrol, Minesweeper, bombed in the North Sea 2 Feb 1942 |
| HMT Cloverdale | Nov 1939 | Minesweeper, auxiliary patrol, returned Dec 1945 |
| HMT Clyne Castle | Aug 1939 | Minesweeper, wreck dispersal vessel, returned Nov 1945 |
| HMT Clythness | Aug 1939 | Minesweeper, returned Jul 1945 |
| HMT Cobbers | 1939 | Auxiliary patrol, bombed in the North Sea 3 Mar 1941 |
| HMT Cockade | Nov 1939 | Auxiliary patrol, water carrier, Stockade 1944, returned 1945 |
| HMT Cocker | Sep 1940 | Anti-submarine, lost 3 Jun 1942 |
| HMT Collena | Jan 1940 | Boom defence vessel, sold 1946 |
| HMT Comely Bank | Dec 1939 | Balloon barrage vessel, returned 1945 |
| HMT Comet | 1939 | Minesweeper, mined off Falmouth 30 Sep 1940 |
| HMT Comfort | 1939 | Dan layer, rammed in error by Lydd off Dover 29 May 1940 |
| HMT Comitatus | 1939 | Minesweeper, returned 1945 |
| HMT Commander Evans | Jun 1940 | Auxiliary patrol, Minesweeper, Dan layer, returned Aug 1945 |
| HMT Commander Holbrook | Jun 1940 | Auxiliary patrol, returned Nov 1945 |
| HMT Commander Nasmith | Jun 1940 | Auxiliary patrol, Minesweeper, returned May 1945 |
| HMT Commiles | Aug 1939 | Minesweeper, returned Oct 1945 |
| HMT Commodator | Aug 1939 | Minesweeper, returned Oct 1945 |
| HMT Computator | 1939 | Minesweeper, lost in collision off Normandy 21 Jan 1945 |
| HMT Comrades | Sep 1939 | Auxiliary patrol, target service, returned Apr 1946 |
| HMT Concertrator | Aug 1939 | Minesweeper, returned Jan 1946 |
| HMT Concordis | Dec 1939 | Minesweeper, returned May 1946 |
| HMT Confiance | Jul 1940 | Harbour service, returned 1945 |
| HMT Confide | 1 Sep 1940 | Harbour service, returned 1945 |
| HMT Congre | Jul 1940 | Minesweeper, returned Jan 1946 |
| HMT Coniston | Nov 1939 | Auxiliary patrol, Minesweeper, returned 1940 |
| HMT Conquistador | Nov 1939 | Auxiliary patrol, Minesweeper, lost in collision, Thames Estuary 25 Nov 1940 |
| HMT Consbro | Jan 1940 | Boom defence vessel, returned Sep 1945 |
| HMT Consolation | Nov 1939 | Minesweeper, returned Sep 1945 |
| HMT Constant Friend | 1940 | Minesweeper, returned 1945 |
| HMT Constant Hope | 1940 | Balloon barrage vessel, returned 1945 |
| HMT Contender | Feb 1940 | Minesweeper, returned, Oct 1945 |
| HMT Contrive | May 1940 | Mobile wiping unit, returned Feb 1946 |
| HMT Controller | Jan 1940 | Auxiliary patrol, balloon barrage vessel, Esso, returned Sep 1944 |
| HMT Convallaria | Apr 1940 | Auxiliary patrol, returned Mar 1946 |
| HMT Conway | Nov 1939 | Auxiliary patrol, returned 1940 |
| HMT Conway Castle | Aug 1939 | Minesweeper, returned Oct 1945 |
| HMT Copious | Jan 1940 | Auxiliary patrol, returned Aug 1945 |
| HMT Coral Bank | 1940 | Minesweeper, returned Jan 1946 |
| HMT Corcyra | Nov 1940 | Auxiliary patrol, water carrier, sold Aug 1946 |
| HMT Cordela | Aug 1939 | Minesweeper, sold 1946 |
| HMT Corena | Aug 1939 | Minesweeper, sold Apr 1946 |
| HMT Cor Jesu | 1940 | Balloon barrage vessel, bombed off Alnmouth 8 Jun 1941 |
| HMT Corn Rig | 1941 | Harbour service, returned 1945 |
| HMT Cornucopia | 1940 | Harbour service, returned 1944 |
| HMT Coronatia | 1939 | Boom gate vessel, returned 1944 |
| HMT Cortina | Nov 1939 | Auxiliary patrol, Minesweeper, lost in collision off the Humber 7 Dec 1940 |
| HMT Coruscation | 1940 | Auxiliary patrol, returned 1945 |
| HMT Coryphene | 1944 | Esso, returned 1945 |
| HMT Cosmea | 1942 | Harbour service, returned 1945 |
| HMT Cotsmuir | Feb 1940 | Minesweeper, returned Nov 1945 |
| HMT Count | 1940 | Boom defence vessel, returned 1945 |
| HMT Courser | Sep 1940 | Minesweeper, Cavalcade 1945, returned Dec 1946 |
| HMT Couronne | Jul 1940 | Auxiliary patrol water carrier, returned 1947 |
| HMT Courtier | Aug 1939 | Minesweeper, returned Jul 1945 |
| HMT Coventry City | Sep 1939 | Anti-submarine, United States Navy, returned Aug 1945 |
| HMT Craftsman | Aug 1940 | Minesweeper, Dan layer, returned Oct 1944 |
| HMT Craig Alvah | Dec 1939 | Harbour service, returned Dec 1945 |
| HMT Craig Bo | 1940 | Examination service, returned 1944 |
| HMT Craigcoilleach | Aug 1940 | Minesweeper, returned Jul 1945 |
| HMT Craigentinny | 1941 | Examination service, returned 1945 |
| HMT Craig Island | Nov 1939 | Boom defence vessel, returned Nov 1944 |
| HMT Craig Millar | Jan 1940 | Minesweeper, returned Nov 1945 |
| HMT Craig Roy | Dec 1939 | Anti-submarine, returned Oct 1945 |
| HMT Crammond Island | Nov 1939 | Boom defence vessel, bombed off St Abb's Head 2 Apr 1941 |
| HMT Cranefly | Aug 1939 | Minesweeper, returned 1945 |
| HMT Crannock | Nov 1939 | Anti-submarine, returned Jan 1946 |
| HMT Crassula | Oct 1939 | Minesweeper, returned Dec 1946 |
| HMT Creagh Mhor | 1940 | Balloon barrage vessel, returned 1945 |
| HMT Crestflower | Aug 1939 | Minesweeper, bombed off Portsmouth 19 Jul 1940 |
| HMT Crevette | Nov 1939 | Auxiliary patrol, Esso, returned Oct 1944 |
| HMT Cuckoo | Nov 1939 | Auxiliary patrol, returned Feb 1940 |
| HMT Cuirass | Sep 1939 | Boom defence vessel, sold 1945 |
| HMT Cumulus | Sep 1939 | Harbour service, returned 1945 |
| HMT Curtana | Aug 1939 | Minesweeper, returned Oct 1945 |
| HMT Cyelse | Aug 1940 | Water carrier, returned Mar 1946 |
| HMT Cyriel Verschaeve | Jun 1940 | Harbour service, returned Aug 1945 |

== D ==
| Ship designation | Requisitioned | Fate |
|---|---|---|
| HMT Dagny | 1942 | Boom defence vessel, returned 1944 |
| HMT Daisy | Jan 1941 | Harbour service, lost in a storm in the Clyde 25 Apr 1942 |
| HMT Daisy | 1940 | Harbour service, returned 1945 |
| HMT Daisy II | Sep 1939 | Harbour service, returned Nov 1945 |
| HMT Daisy II | 1940 | Harbour service, returned 1945 |
| HMT Daisy Bank | May 1940 | Harbour service, returned Jul 1944 |
| HMT Dale Castle | May 1940 | Auxiliary patrol, target service, returned Mar 1946 |
| HMT Dalmatia | Sep 1939 | Minesweeper, Dan layer, sold Apr 1946 |
| HMT Damito | Aug 1939 | Minesweeper, store carrier, returned Jan 1946 |
| HMT Dandolo | 1944 | Esso, returned 1945 |
| HMT Dane | Jan 1940 | Minesweeper, returned Jan 1946 |
| HMT Daneman | Aug 1939 | Anti-submarine, lost in collision with submerged ice, North Atlantic 8 May 1943 |
| HMT Daniel Clowden | Aug 1939 | Minesweeper, returned Oct 1945 |
| HMT Darcy Cooper | 1940 | Exam, bombed at Harwich 9 Apr 1941 |
| HMT Darnaway | Dec 1939 | Harbour service, returned Sep 1945 |
| HMT Darnett Ness | Aug 1939 | Minesweeper, returned Sep 1945 |
| HMT Darogah | Dec 1939 | Minesweeper, mined in the Thames Estuary 27 Jan 1941 |
| HMT Darthema | 1939 | Minesweeper, returned 1945 |
| HMT Darwen | Nov 1939 | Auxiliary patrol, Minesweeper, returned Feb 1946 |
| HMT David Haigh | Sep 1939 | Boom defence vessel, returned Jun 1946 |
| HMT David Ogilvie | Sep 1939 | Minesweeper, returned Jul 1946 |
| HMT Davy | Aug 1939 | Anti-submarine, sold 1945 |
| HMT Daybreak | 1941 | Minesweeper, returned 1945 |
| HMT Daylight | 1941 | Minesweeper, returned 1945 |
| HMT Dayspring | 1940 | Auxiliary patrol, mreturned Aug 1946 |
| HMT Debra Huysenne | Jul 1940 | Balloon barrage vessel, returned Aug 1946 |
| HMT De Drie Gezusters | Jul 1940 | Auxiliary patrol, returned 1945 |
| HMT Defensor | 1940 | Harbour service, returned Jan 1946 |
| HMT De Heilige Familie | Jun 1940 | Harbour service, returned Sep 1945 |
| HMT De Hoop | Jul 1940 | Auxiliary patrol, Liege 1941, returned Sep 1945 |
| HMT De Hoop | 1940 | Balloon barrage vessel, returned 1945 |
| HMT De La Pole | May 1940 | Auxiliary patrol, Minesweeper, returned Dec 1945 |
| HMT Delila | Jun 1940 | Auxiliary patrol, returned Jan 1946 |
| HMT Delphin II | 1940 | Exam, returned Jan 1946 |
| HMT Delphinus | Nov 1939 | Minesweeper, sold 1945 |
| HMT Deo Volante | 1940 | Auxiliary patrol, returned 1945 |
| HMT Derby County | Aug 1939 | Anti-submarine, sold 1945 |
| HMT De Roza | 1940 | Auxiliary patrol, returned 1945 |
| HMT Dervish | Jun 1940 | Minesweeper, mined off the Humber 9 Sep 1940 |
| HMT Desiree | Nov 1939 | Minesweeper, mined in the Thames Estuary 16 Jan 1941 |
| HMT Destinn | Jan 1940 | Auxiliary patrol, returned Aug 1945 |
| HMT Devon County | Nov 1939 | Minesweeper, mined in the Thames Estuary 1 Jul 1941 |
| HMT Devotion | 1941 | Water carrier, returned 1945 |
| HMT Dew | Nov 1940 | Minesweeper, fire float, returned May 1946 |
| HMT Dewy Eve | Jan 1940 | Minesweeper, lost in collision at Scapa 9 Jun 1940 |
| HMT Dewy Rose | 1940 | Balloon barrage vessel, returned 1945 |
| HMT Dhoon | May 1940 | Auxiliary patrol, Minesweeper, Dhoon Glen 1943, returned Nov 1945 |
| HMT Diana Lucie | 1940 | Auxiliary patrol, mobile wiping unit, returned 1945 |
| HMT Dick Whittington | May 1940 | De-gaussing vessel, returned Oct 1945 |
| HMT Digit | 1940 | Boom defence vessel, sold 1946 |
| HMT Diligent | 1940 | Balloon barrage vessel, returned 1940 |
| HMT Dilimer | 1940 | Auxiliary patrol, returned 1945 |
| HMT Dirkje | 1940 | Minesweeper, returned 1945 |
| HMT Disa | Sep 1939 | Minesweeper, returned May 1940 |
| HMT Doctor Lee | Dec 1939 | Boom defence vessel, returned Nov 1944 |
| HMT Dolfijn | 1940 | Minesweeper, Goeree 1943, returned 1945 |
| HMT Dolores | Jan 1940 | Dan layer, sold 1946 |
| HMT Domino | Mar 1940 | Minesweeper, sold Jul 1945 |
| HMT Donna Nook | Jun 1940 | Auxiliary patrol, Minesweeper, lost in collision, North Sea 25 Sep 1943 |
| HMT Doonie Braes | May 1940 | Auxiliary patrol, returned Jan 1945 |
| HMT Doorie Brae | Nov 1939 | Auxiliary patrol, returned 1945 |
| HMT Dorienta | Sep 1939 | Minesweeper, returned May 1946 |
| HMT Dorileen | Jan 1940 | Boom defence vessel, sold May 1946 |
| HMT Dorinda | Aug 1939 | Minesweeper, returned Nov 1945 |
| HMT Dorothy Gray | Jul 1940 | Auxiliary patrol, returned Dec 1944 |
| HMT Dorothy Lambert | Feb 1940 | Minesweeper, returned Feb 1946 |
| HMT Dourswold | 1940 | Balloon barrage vessel, returned 1945 |
| HMT Drainie | 1940 | Water carrier, sold 1947 |
| HMT Drangey | Aug 1939 | Anti-submarine, sold 1946 |
| HMT Dreel Castle | Nov 1939 | Minesweeper, returned 1940 |
| HMT Drobak | 1940 | Minesweeper, returned 1946 |
| HMT Dromio | Aug 1939 | Minesweeper, lost in collision off Whitby 22 Dec 1939 |
| HMT Drummer | Aug 1939 | Minesweeper, mined off Brightlingsea 4 Aug 1940 |
| HMT Drummer Boy | Nov 1939 | Minesweeper, returned Aug 1945 |
| HMT Duchesse De Brabant | Jul 1940 | Anti-submarine, returned 1945 |
| HMT Dulcibelle | Nov 1939 | Auxiliary patrol, returned Nov 1944 |
| HMT Dundarg | 1940 | Boom tender, returned 1945 |
| HMT Dunedin | May 1940 | Examination service, returned Jan 1945 |
| HMT Dungeness | May 1940 | Auxiliary patrol, bombed off coast of Norfolk 15 Nov 1940 |
| HMT Dunleith | Sep 1939 | Store hulk, returned Feb 1946 |
| HMT Dunraven Castle | Mar 1940 | Minesweeper, returned Sep 1945 |
| HMT Dusk | 1941 | Minesweeper, sold 1946 |
| HMT Durraween | 1939 | Minesweeper, returned 1946 |
| HMT Duthies | Aug 1939 | Bombed at Montrose 25 Oct 1940 |
| HMT D. W. Fitzgerald | Aug 1940 | Minesweeper, returned Jan 1945 |

== E ==
| Ship designation | Requisitioned | Fate |
|---|---|---|
| HMT Eadwine | Oct 1940 | Auxiliary patrol, returned Mar 1946 |
| HMT Eager | Nov 1939 | Minesweeper, returned Oct 1944 |
| HMT Earl Essex | Nov 1939 | Minesweeper, returned Feb 1946 |
| HMT Earl Kitchener | Aug 1939 | Minesweeper, returned Apr 1946 |
| HMT East Coast | 1944 | Esso, returned 1945 |
| HMT Eastcoates | Aug 1939 | Minesweeper, returned 1945 |
| HMT Eastern Dawn | 1940 | De-gaussing vessel, returned 1946 |
| HMT Easter Rose | 1940 | Balloon barrage vessel, submarine tender, returned 1945 |
| HMT Ebor Abbey | Jan 1940 | Auxiliary patrol, returned Feb 1946 |
| HMT Ebor Jewel | 1940 | Balloon barrage vessel, returned 1945 |
| HMT Ebor Wyke | Aug 1939 | Minesweeper, sunk by U-979 off Iceland 2 May 1945 |
| HMT Eccleshill | Feb 1940 | Balloon barrage vessel, returned Jan 1945 |
| HMT Edith M Purdy | Feb 1940 | Balloon barrage vessel, returned May 1945 |
| HMT Edouard | Jul 1940 | Auxiliary patrol, lost 22 Feb 1941 |
| HMT Vlaanderen | Sep 1939 | Lost by unknown cause off Iceland? |
| HMT Edwardian | Aug 1939 | Minesweeper, sold Jan 1946 |
| HMT Edward Walmsley | May 1940 | Minesweeper, returned Jul 1946 |
| HMT Edwina | 1941 | Auxiliary patrol, returned May 1945 |
| HMT Egeland | Nov 1939 | Dan layer, wrecked, coast of Palestine 29 Nov 1941 |
| HMT Egeria | Jan 1940 | Minesweeper, returned Jan 1945 |
| HMT Eileen Duncan | Nov 1939 | Minesweeper, bombed at North Shields 30 Sep 1941 |
| HMT Eileen Emma | Sep 1939 | Auxiliary patrol, returned Apr 1946 |
| HMT Elbury | Feb 1940 | Minesweeper, returned Jul 1945 |
| HMT Eldorado | May 1940 | Minesweeper, returned Nov 1941 |
| HMT Electra II | Nov 1939 | Auxiliary patrol, returned Feb 1946 |
| HMT Elena | 1940 | Minesweeper, returned Jan 1945 |
| HMT Elisabeth Guilbert | 1939 | Auxiliary patrol, returned 1945 |
| HMT Elizabeth Angela | Jun 1940 | Minesweeper, bombed in The Downs 13 Aug 1940 |
| HMT Elizabeth Therese | Oct 1939 | Minesweeper, lost by unknown cause? 4 Jul 1945 |
| HMT Elk | Dec 1939 | Auxiliary patrol, Minesweeper, mined off Plymouth 27 Nov 1940 |
| HMT Eloquent | Dec 1939 | Minesweeper, returned 1946 |
| HMT Else Rykens | May 1940 | Anti-submarine, returned Nov 1945 |
| HMT Elsie Cam | Jan 1940 | Minesweeper, returned Jan 1946 |
| HMT Elsie & Nellie | 1940 | Balloon barrage vessel, returned Feb 1945 |
| HMT Elysian Dawn | 1940 | Harbour service, returned 1945 |
| HMT Embrace | Nov 1939 | HDPC, wrecked in Loch Alsh 2 Aug 1940 |
| HMT Emillion | Nov 1939 | Minesweeper, mined, Thames Estuary 24 Oct 1941 |
| HMT Empyrian | Nov 1939 | Minesweeper, store carrier, returned Jan 1945 |
| HMT En Avant | 1940 | Minesweeper, returned 1945 |
| HMT Enterprising | May 1940 | De-gaussing vessel, sold 1947 |
| HMT Enzie | Sep 1939 | Harbour service, returned 1945 |
| HMT Ephretah | 1940 | Anti-submarine, returned 1945 |
| HMT Epine | Sep 1939 | Minesweeper, returned Jan 1946 |
| HMT Equerry | Aug 1939 | Minesweeper, returned Apr 1945 |
| HMT Eridanus | Apr 1944 | Esso, returned Nov 1944 |
| HMT Frillus | Nov 1939 | Auxiliary patrol, returned Jan 1940 |
| HMT Erimo | Sep 1939 | Minesweeper, returned 1945 |
| HMT Erin | 1940 | Anti-submarine, blown up by Italian frogmen at Gibraltar 18 Jan 1942 |
| HMT Erith | 1940 | Minesweeper, returned 1945 |
| HMT Erna | May 1940 | Boom defence vessel, returned 1945 |
| HMT Eroican | Apr 1940 | Minesweeper, Esso, returned Feb 1945 |
| HMT Escallonia | 1940 | Auxiliary patrol, returned 1944 |
| HMT Ethel Taylor | 1939 | Auxiliary patrol, mined off the Tyne 22 Nov 1940 |
| HMT Etoile Polaire | 1940 | Dan layer, returned 1945 |
| HMT Etruria | May 1940 | Boom defence vessel, returned Feb 1946 |
| HMT Etruscan | Nov 1939 | Auxiliary patrol, minesweeper, Esso, returned Nov 1944 |
| HMT Euclase | Feb 1940 | Minesweeper, returned Apr 1946 |
| HMT Eunice & Nellie | Dec 1939 | Minesweeper, torpedo recovery vessel, returned? |
| HMT Evelina | Nov 1939 | Auxiliary patrol, mined off the Tyne 16 Dec 1940 |
| HMT Eveline | Jul 1940 | Minesweeper, lost in collision, Milford Haven 27 Jan 1942 |
| HMT Evelyn Rose | May 1940 | Auxiliary patrol, Minesweeper, returned 1945 |
| HMT Evening Primrose | 1939 | Minesweeper, returned 1945 |
| HMT Everton | Dec 1939 | Dan layer, auxiliary patrol, returned Mar 1946 |
| HMT Evesham | Dec 1939 | Auxiliary patrol, lost 27 May 1941, salved & scrapped Apr 1945 |
| HMT Ewald | Jun 1940 | Minesweeper, returned 1945 |
| HMT Ex Fortis | Dec 1939 | Balloon barrage vessel, returned Sep 1945 |
| HMT Exchequer | May 1940 | Exam., returned Apr 1946 |
| HMT Exyhane | Nov 1939 | Minesweeper, returned Dec 1945 |

== F ==
| Ship designation | Requisitioned | Fate |
|---|---|---|
| HMT Fair Breeze | Sep 1939 | Auxiliary patrol, wrecked off Dunkirk 1 Jun 1940 |
| HMT Fairhaven | 1940 | Balloon barrage vessel, foundered, N. Atlantic 5 Sep 1944 |
| HMT Fairway | May 1940 | Auxiliary patrol, Minesweeper, returned Mar 1946 |
| HMT Fair Weather | Jan 1940 | Auxiliary patrol, returned Dec 1945 |
| HMT Fairy Knowe | Nov 1939 | Minesweeper, target service, returned Dec 1945 |
| HMT Faithful Star | Sep 1939 | Auxiliary patrol, returned Mar 1946 |
| HMT Falk | Mar 1941 | Anti-submarine, returned Oct 1946 |
| HMT Farsund | Jul 1940 | Anti-submarine, returned 1945 |
| HMT Favour | 1940 | Auxiliary patrol, returned 1945 |
| HMT Fawn | Jan 1940 | Anti-submarine, returned 1945 |
| HMT Feaco | Oct 1939 | Minesweeper, returned Nov 1945 |
| HMT Fear Not | 1940 | Auxiliary patrol, store carrier, Exam, returned 1945 |
| HMT Feasible | Nov 1939 | Minesweeper, returned Aug 1945 |
| HMT Fee Des Eaux | Sep 1940 | Auxiliary patrol, returned Jan 1946 |
| HMT Fellowship | Nov 1939 | Minesweeper, returned 1946 |
| HMT Fermern | 1941 | Minesweeper, returned 1946 |
| HMT Fenella | Apr 1940 | Exam, returned 1945 |
| HMT Fentonian | Nov 1939 | Minesweeper, Esso, returned Feb 1945 |
| HMT Fertile Vale | Dec 1939 | Exam, lost in collision off the Tay 19 Jul 1941 |
| HMT Fezenta | Nov 1939 | Minesweeper, returned Nov 1945 |
| HMT Fidget | Nov 1939 | Mine recovery vessel, Auxiliary patrol, air/sea rescue, sold Jan 1946 |
| HMT Fieldgate | 1940 | Boom gate vessel, returned 1945 |
| HMT Fifeshire | Sep 1939 | Anti-submarine, bombed off Copinsay 20 Feb 1940 |
| HMT Filey Bay | Aug 1939 | Minesweeper, returned Mar 1945 |
| HMT Finesse | 1940 | Minesweeper, sold 1946 |
| HMT Finlande | Sep 1940 | To Ministry of War Transport, Apr 1941 |
| HMT Fintray | Feb 1940 | Minesweeper, returned Jan 1945 |
| HMT Firefly | Sep 1939 | Minesweeper, returned Oct 1945 |
| HMT Firmament | May 1941 | Minesweeper, wrecked near Alexandria 30 May 1944 |
| HMT Fisher Boy | Sep 1939 | Mine recovery vessel, sold Jul 1946 |
| HMT Fisher Girl | 1940 | Mobile wiping unit, bombed off Falmouth 25 Nov 1941 |
| HMT Fisher Lad | Dec 1939 | Anti-submarine, returned Nov 1945 |
| HMT Fisher Queen | Oct 1940 | HDPC, returned Sep 1946 |
| HMT Flanders | Aug 1939 | Minesweeper, returned Dec 1945 |
| HMT Flandre | Jun 1940 | Auxiliary patrol, Minesweeper, returned Dec 1945 |
| HMT Flash | Apr 1941 | Minesweeper, returned Nov 1945 |
| HMT Fleming | Aug 1939 | Minesweeper, bombed, Thames Estuary 27 Jul 1940 |
| HMT Flicker | May 1941 | Minesweeper, returned Dec 1945 |
| HMT Flixton | Aug 1939 | Exam, returned Jul 1946 |
| HMT Florence Brierley | Jan 1940 | Boom defence vessel, sold Aug 1946 |
| HMT Florida | Dec 1940 | Minesweeper, returned Mar 1946 |
| HMT Florio | Aug 1939 | Minesweeper, returned Apr 1945 |
| HMT Flow | Sep 1939 | Exam, returned Mar 1946 |
| HMT Flush | 1940 | Balloon barrage vessel, returned 1945 |
| HMT Flying Admiral | 1940 | Auxiliary patrol |
| HMT Flying Wing | Nov 1939 | Anti-submarine, Minesweeper, sold 1946 |
| HMT Foamcrest | Jun 1940 | Auxiliary patrol, sold Mar 1946 |
| HMT Fontenoy | Aug 1939 | Minesweeper, bombed in the North Sea 19 Nov 1940 |
| HMT Force | Feb 1940 | Minesweeper, bombed in the North Sea 27 Jun 1941 |
| HMT Forecast | Nov 1939 | Auxiliary patrol, lost by unknown cause in the Clyde 10 Apr 1944 |
| HMT Forerunner | Nov 1939 | Minesweeper, lost in collision, Thames Estuary 14 Oct 1941 |
| HMT Foresight | 1941 | Harbour service, returned 1946 |
| HMT Forfeit | Jan 1940 | Auxiliary patrol, returned Jun 1946 |
| HMT Fort Robert | Nov 1939 | Minesweeper, returned Aug 1945 |
| HMT Fort Rose | May 1940 | Auxiliary patrol, returned 1945 |
| HMT Fort Royal | Aug 1939 | Minesweeper, bombed off Aberdeen 9 Feb 1940 |
| HMT Fort Ryan | Sep 1939 | Boom defence vessel, boom gate vessel, returned Dec 1944 |
| HMT Fortuna | Jun 1940 | Auxiliary patrol, bombed off St. Abbs Head 3 Apr 1941 |
| HMT Foss | Jan 1940 | Boom defence vessel, returned Jul 1946 |
| HMT Franc Tireur | May 1940 | Auxiliary patrol, minesweeper, torpedoed by E-boat off Harwich 25 Sep 1943 |
| HMT Fragrant | 1941 | Harbour service, returned 1945 |
| HMT Francolin | Jun 1940 | Auxiliary patrol, bombed off Cromer 12 Nov 1941 |
| HMT Freres Coquelin | Jul 1940 | Minesweeper, returned Feb 1946 |
| HMT Friarage | Sep 1939 | Minesweeper, exam, Auxiliary patrol, returned Dec 1945 |
| HMT Friendly Girls | Sep 1939 | Base ship Fox 1940–42, returned Oct 1945 |
| HMT Friesland | 1940 | Minesweeper, returned 1945 |
| HMT Frons Olivae | Nov 1939 | Mine recovery vessel, returned 1945 |
| HMT Full Moon | May 1941 | Minesweeper, returned May 1946 |
| HMT Furze | 1941 | Water carrier, returned 1945 |
| HMT Futurist | 1940 | Minesweeper, 1944 |
| HMT Flydea | Sep 1939 | Minesweeper, returned Dec, 1945 |

== G ==
| Ship designation | Requisitioned | Fate |
|---|---|---|
| HMT Gabrielle Denise | Jul 1940 | Minesweeper, target service, returned 1945 |
| HMT Gabrielle-Maria | 1940 | Minesweeper, Channel Fire 1942, returned 1946 |
| HMT Gadfly | Aug 1939 | Minesweeper, returned Sep 1945 |
| HMT Gadra | Nov 1939 | Auxiliary patrol, returned Jan 1940, lost 6 Jan 1941 |
| HMT Gallinule | Nov 1939 | Auxiliary patrol, returned Jan 1940 |
| HMT Galvani | Jun 1940 | Auxiliary patrol Aug 1945 |
| HMT Garola | Nov 1939 | Minesweeper, store carrier, returned May 1946 |
| HMT Gaston Riviere | 1940 | Minesweeper, returned 1946 |
| HMT Gaul | Sep 1939 | Anti-submarine, bombed off Norway 3 May 1940 |
| HMT Gava | Nov 1939 | Auxiliary patrol, target service, returned Jun 1946 |
| HMT Gellyburn | Sep 1939 | Water carrier, returned Apr 1945 |
| HMT Gemma | 1941 | Minesweeper, sold 1949 |
| HMT General Birdwood | Aug 1939 | Minesweeper, Esso, sold May 1946 |
| HMT General Botha | Jul 1940 | Minesweeper, returned Nov 1945 |
| HMT General Foch | 1940 | Auxiliary patrol, returned 1946 |
| HMT General Leman | 1940 | Balloon barrage vessel, returned 1945 |
| HMT Genius | Oct 1939 | Minesweeper, returned Nov 1945 |
| HMT Geordie | Dec 1939 | Minesweeper, harbour service, returned May 1946 |
| HMT George & Albert | Dec 1939 | Minesweeper, returned Jan 1946 |
| HMT George Adgell | Jun 1940 | Auxiliary patrol, Minesweeper, returned Jan 1946 |
| HMT George Baker | Sep 1939 | Harbour service, returned 1945 |
| HMT George Bligh | Sep 1939 | Boom defence vessel, returned Dec 1945 |
| HMT George Cousins | Aug 1939 | Minesweeper, returned Jul 1945 |
| HMT George D Irvin | May 1940 | Boom defence vessel, returned Jul 1945 |
| HMT George Robb | Aug 1939 | Minesweeper, sold Jan 1946 |
| HMT George R Purdy | Aug 1939 | Exam, returned Oct 1944 |
| HMT Georgette | Nov 1939 | Minesweeper, returned May 1946 |
| HMT Gerberdina Johanna | 1940 | Minesweeper, returned 1945 |
| HMT Germiston | Aug 1941 | Minesweeper, returned May 1946 |
| HMT Gervais Rentoul | Nov 1939 | Flare drifter, auxiliary patrol, returned May 1946 |
| HMT G. G. Baird | 1941 | Harbour service, returned 1946 |
| HMT Gilbert Eugene | 1940 | Auxiliary patrol, mine tender, returned May 1946 |
| HMT Gillian | Aug 1939 | Exam, returned Aug 1945 |
| HMT Gilt Edge | Nov 1939 | Minesweeper, Dan layer, returned Aug 1945 |
| HMT Gippsland | 1942 | Auxiliary patrol, sold Nov 1946 |
| HMT Girafe | 1940 | Boom defence vessel, returned 1945 |
| HMT Girard | Jun 1940 | Boom defence vessel, sold Jan 1947 |
| HMT Girl Ellen | Dec 1939 | Auxiliary patrol, returned Mar 1946 |
| HMT Girl Ena | 1941 | Harbour service, returned 1945 |
| HMT Girl Ethel | May 1940 | Mobile wiping unit, returned Apr 1945 |
| HMT Girl Glady's | Nov 1939 | Flare drifter, auxiliary patrol, exam, returned Feb 1946 |
| HMT Girl Lizzie | May 1940 | Harbour service, returned Jun 1946 |
| HMT Girl Margaret | Nov 1939 | Minesweeper, Boom defence vessel, returned Mar 1946 |
| HMT Girl Minna | 1940 | Target service, returned 1945 |
| HMT Girl Nancy | 1940 | Minesweeper, Auxiliary patrol, returned Jan 1946 |
| HMT Girl Pamela | Nov 1939 | Flare drifter, lost in collision off Dunkirk 29 May 1940 |
| HMT Girl Pat | 1940 | Minesweeper, auxiliary patrol, returned 1945 |
| HMT Girl Violet | Mar 1940 | Exam returned Nov 1945 |
| HMT Girl Winifred | Dec 1939 | Auxiliary patrol, returned Dec 1945 |
| HMT Givenchy | 1940 | Minesweeper, returned 1945 |
| HMT Glacier | May 1940 | Auxiliary patrol, returned Jun 1944 |
| HMT Gladys | Nov 1939 | Boom defence vessel, returned Apr 1946 |
| HMT Glatian | Nov 1939 | Auxiliary patrol, returned 1945 |
| HMT Gleam | 1941 | Harbour service, lost in collision in the Clyde area 15 Jun 1944 |
| HMT Gleam On | Dec 1939 | Minesweeper, exam, returned Dec 1945 |
| HMT Glen Albyn | Dec 1939 | Auxiliary patrol, mined in Loch Ewe 23 Dec 1939 |
| HMT Glen Heather | Nov 1939 | Minesweeper, returned Nov 1945 |
| HMT Glen Kidston | Aug 1939 | Minesweeper, returned Jul 1945 |
| HMT Gloamin | Dec 1939 | Minesweeper, returned Mar, 1945 |
| HMT Gloria | Feb 1940 | Balloon barrage vessel, returned Sep 1944 |
| HMT Glow | Dec 1939 | Minesweeper, returned Nov 1945 |
| HMT Go Ahead | 1939 | Minesweeper, lost in collision off Sheerness 18 Nov 1940 |
| HMT Golden Chance | 1941 | FAA safety vessel, returned Jan 1946 |
| HMT Golden Dawn | Feb 1940 | Harbour service, lost by unknown cause in the Clyde? 4 Apr 1940 |
| HMT Golden Effort | Dec 1939 | Minesweeper, lost by unknown cause in the Clyde? 23 Sep 1943 |
| HMT Golden Emblem | Jan 1940 | Auxiliary patrol, returned Dec 1945 |
| HMT Golden Gift | Nov 1939 | Flare drifter, Auxiliary patrol, lost in collision off Oban 6 Apr 1943 |
| HMT Golden Harvest | Sep 1939 | Minesweeper, returned Jun 1946 |
| HMT Golden Line | 1941 | Harbour service, returned 1946 |
| HMT Golden Miller | Nov 1939 | Auxiliary patrol, returned Sep 1945 |
| HMT Golden News | Nov 1939 | Minesweeper, returned Mar 1946 |
| HMT Golden Sheaf | 1940 | Harbour service, returned Jul 1945 |
| HMT Golden Sunbeam | Nov 1939 | Flare drifter, Auxiliary patrol, lost in collision of Dungeness 19 Aug 1943 |
| HMT Golden Thyme | 1939 | Auxiliary patrol, returned 1945 |
| HMT Golden View | Oct 1939 | Minesweeper, returned Mar 1946 |
| HMT Golden West | 1941 | Harbour service, returned 1945 |
| HMT Golden West | Oct 1940 | De-gaussing, lost 15 Jan 1945 |
| HMT Good Will | Jan 1940 | Auxiliary patrol, returned 1946 |
| HMT Goolgwai | Oct 1939 | Minesweeper, returned 1946 |
| HMT Goonambee | Aug 1940 | Minesweeper, returned 1944 |
| HMT Goorangai | Oct 1939 | Minesweeper, lost in collision with SS Duntroon off Port Phillip 20 Nov 1940 |
| HMT Goosander | Nov 1939 | Water carrier, Esso, returned Feb 1946 |
| HMT Gorse | Dec 1939 | Anti-submarine, returned Nov 1945 |
| HMT Goth | Aug 1939 | Minesweeper, sold Nov 1945 |
| HMT Goulding | 1940 | Minesweeper, sold May 1946 |
| HMT Gowan | Dec 1939 | Exam, returned Apr 1945 |
| HMT Gowan Craig | Dec 1939 | Minesweeper, returned Jun 1946 |
| HMT Gowan Hill | Aug 1939 | Harbour service, bombed in the Clyde 7 May 1941 |
| HMT Graff Van Vlanderen | Sep 1940 | Boom defence vessel, returned Apr 1945 |
| HMT Grampian | Aug 1939 | Minesweeper, returned Mar 1946 |
| HMT Grateful | 1939 | Auxiliary patrol, mine recovery vessel, returned Feb 1946 |
| HMT Great Admiral | May 1940 | Auxiliary patrol, returned Jun 1945 |
| HMT Greenfly | Sep 1939 | Anti-submarine, sold 1945 |
| HMT Green Howard | Aug 1939 | Minesweeper, returned Mar 1946 |
| HMT Green Pastures | Dec 1939 | Minesweeper, returned Nov 1945 |
| HMT Gregory | Aug 1939 | Minesweeper, returned Jul 1945 |
| HMT Gribb | Jun 1941 | Minesweeper, returned Apr 1946 |
| HMT Grimsby Town | Aug 1939 | Anti-submarine, returned Nov 1945 |
| HMT Grimstad | Jul 1940 | Minesweeper, returned Jan 1946 |
| HMT Grimwood | May 1940 | Minesweeper, returned May 1946 |
| HMT Groenland | 1940 | To MoWT 1941 |
| HMT Grosmont Castle | Feb 1940 | Minesweeper, returned Feb 1946 |
| HMT Guide Gazelle | May 1940 | Balloon barrage vessel, returned Nov 1946 |
| HMT Guide On | Nov 1939 | Minesweeper, returned Feb 1946 |
| HMT Guide Us | 1940 | Salvage vessel, returned Nov 1942 |
| HMT Guiding Light | Dec 1939 | Anti-submarine, returned Jun 1945 |
| HMT Gula | 1940 | Dan layer, harbour service, returned 1945 |
| HMT Gulfoss | Aug 1939 | Minesweeper, mined in the Channel 9 Mar 1941 |
| HMT Gunner | Sep 1939 | Minesweeper, Dan layer, returned Feb 1946 |
| HMT Gvas II | Jun 1940 | Minesweeper, returned Jun 1946 |
| HMT Gwenllian | Nov 1939 | Minesweeper, returned Jan 1946 |
| HMT Gwmaho | Nov 1939 | Boom defence vessel, returned 1946 |

== H ==
| Ship designation | Requisitioned | Fate |
|---|---|---|
| HMT Haarlem | Jun 1940 | Anti-submarine, returned May 1946 |
| HMT Hailstorm | May 1941 | Minesweeper, Dan layer, returned Sep 1945 |
| HMT Hammond | Aug 1939 | Harbour service, returned Jan 1944 |
| HMT Hampshire | Sep 1939 | Anti-submarine, lost 25 Apr 1940 |
| HMT Handsome | Jan 1940 | Anti-submarine |
| HMT Harlech Castle | Feb 1940 | Harbour service, returned Sep 1945 |
| HMT Harmony | 1940 | Minesweeper, lost in collision off Invergordon 15 Nov 1941 |
| HMT Harpoon | Mar 1943 | Training vessel, returned Dec 1945 |
| HMT Harry Eastick | Oct 1940 | Harbour service, returned Dec 1945 |
| HMT Harry Melling | Aug 1939 | Minesweeper, returned Jul 1945 |
| HMT Harstad | Jul 1940 | Minesweeper, torpedoed by E-boat in the Channel 27 Jul 1943 |
| HMT Harvest Gleaner | Nov 1939 | Minesweeper, bombed off east coast 28 Oct 1940 |
| HMT Harvest Hope | Jun 1940 | Auxiliary patrol, returned 1945 |
| HMT Harvest Moon | Dec 1939 | Expended as block ship, 9 Sep 1940 |
| HMT Harvest Reaper | Dec 1939 | Minesweeper, harbour service, returned Nov 1946 |
| HMT Hatano | Sep 1939 | Minesweeper, returned May 1946 |
| HMT Hatsuse | Aug 1939 | Minesweeper, returned Aug 1945 |
| HMT Haug I | Dec 1940 | Minesweeper, returned Jun 1946 |
| HMT Hauken | May 1940 | Minesweeper, returned Mar 1946 |
| HMT Hav | Mar 1940 | Minesweeper, returned 1945 |
| HMT Hayburne Wyke | May 1940 | Auxiliary patrol, Minesweeper, sunk by U-boat off Ostend 2 Jan 1945 |
| HMT Heathbank | Apr 1940 | Transport, returned May 1945 |
| HMT Heather Sprig | Apr 1940 | Balloon barrage vessel, harbour service, returned Aug 1946 |
| HMT Heatherry Brae | Oct 1940 | Balloon barrage vessel, returned 1944 |
| HMT Hektor | Jul 1940 | Minesweeper, returned Jun 1946 |
| HMT Hector 7 | 1940 | Minesweeper, returned 1945 |
| HMT Hektor Frans | Oct 1940 | Auxiliary patrol, returned Oct 1945 |
| HMT Helen Slater | 1941 | Harbour service, returned 1945 |
| HMT Helen West | 1939 | Auxiliary patrol, returned 1945 |
| HMT Helier II | Mar 1940 | Anti-submarine, returned Oct 1945 |
| HMT Helvetia | Jun 1940 | Auxiliary patrol, Minesweeper, returned Sep 1946 |
| HMT Hendrick Conscience | Jun 1940 | Auxiliary patrol, to MoWT Dec 1942 |
| HMT Henriette | Jul 1940 | Auxiliary patrol, Minesweeper, mined off the Humber 26 Dec 1941 |
| HMT Hercules | 1940 | Minesweeper, returned Jan 1946 |
| HMT Herdis | Jun 1940 | Balloon barrage vessel, returned 1945 |
| HMT Heroine | Jun 1940 | Minesweeper, Esso, returned Nov 1944 |
| HMT Heron | Nov 1939 | Auxiliary patrol, returned Jan 1940, lost 12 Jul 1942 |
| HMT Hertfordshire | 1939 | Anti-submarine, United States Navy, returned 1945 |
| HMT High Tide | Aug 1940 | Exam, foundered off the north coast of Wales 30 Mar 1945 |
| HMT Hilda Cooper | Sep 1939 | Exam, returned Oct 1944 |
| HMT Hildina | Aug 1939 | Minesweeper, returned Apr 1946 |
| HMT Hinnoy | Apr 1941 | Minesweeper, returned Jan 1946 |
| HMT H. J. Bull | 1940 | Auxiliary patrol, Namsos 1942, returned 1946, |
| HMT Hollydale | May 1940 | Exam, returned 1945 |
| HMT Hollyrood | Dec 1939 | Auxiliary patrol, returned Jan 1940 |
| HMT Honeydew | Dec 1939 | Harbour service, returned 1946 |
| HMT Honingsvaag | Apr 1940 | Auxiliary patrol, returned 1945 |
| HMT Honjo | 1939 | Minesweeper, blown up by Italian frogmen at Gibraltar 18 Jan 1942 |
| HMT Horten | Jul 1940 | Anti-submarine, air/sea rescue, returned 1945 |
| HMT Hortensia | Jul 1940 | Minesweeper, returned Nov 1945 |
| HMT Hosanna | Nov 1939 | Minesweeper, returned Nov 1944 |
| HMT Hoverfly | 1939 | Minesweeper, returned Jan 1945 |
| HMT Huddersfield Town | 1939 | Anti-submarine, sold 1945 |
| HMT Hugh Walpole | Aug 1939 | Anti-submarine sold Apr 1946 |
| HMT Humphrey | Oct 1939 | Minesweeper, returned Aug 1944 |
| HMT Hval V | Jul 1940 | Minesweeper, returned Mar 1946 |
| HMT Hyperion | 1940 | Auxiliary patrol, returned 1944 |

== I ==
| Ship designation | Requisitioned | Fate |
|---|---|---|
| HMT Ibis I | Aug 1940 | Balloon barrage vessel, returned May 1945 |
| HMT Ibis II | Nov 1943 | Harbour service, Esso, returned 1945 |
| HMT Ijuin | Aug 1939 | Minesweeper, returned Jan 1946 |
| HMT Imbat | 1940 | Harbour service, lost in collision at Scapa 4 Feb 1941 |
| HMT Imelda | Dec 1939 | Boom defence vessel, returned Jan 1946 |
| HMT Imhoff | Jul 1941 | Minesweeper, returned May 1946 |
| HMT Immortelle | Nov 1941 | Minesweeper, returned Dec 1946 |
| HMT Impala | Nov 1940 | Auxiliary patrol, returned Apr 1946 |
| HMT Imperia | Nov 1939 | Boom gate vessel, returned Nov 1945 |
| HMT Imperialist | Aug 1939 | Anti-submarine, returned Oct 1945 |
| HMT Inchgower | Nov 1939 | Minesweeper, returned Feb 1946 |
| HMT Indian Star | Oct 1939 | Anti-submarine, returned Oct 1945 |
| HMT Industry | Nov 1939 | Minesweeper, returned Dec 1945 |
| HMT Inspector | Mar 1940 | Harbour service, returned Nov 1945 |
| HMT Internos | Nov 1939 | Minesweeper, TRV, returned Mar 1946 |
| HMT Inverness | Nov 1939 | Auxiliary patrol, returned Jan 1940 |
| HMT Invercairn | Dec 1939 | Anti-submarine, returned Nov 1945 |
| HMT Invercauld | Jul 1940 | Minesweeper, returned Nov 1945 |
| HMT Inverclyde | Aug 1939 | Minesweeper, foundered in tow off Beachy Head 16 Oct 1942 |
| HMT Inverforth | Nov 1939 | Minesweeper, returned Jul 1945 |
| HMT Invertay | Aug 1940 | Minesweeper, returned Jul 1946 |
| HMT Inverugie | Dec 1939 | Minesweeper, Balloon barrage vessel, returned Aug 1945 |
| HMT Iranian | Nov 1939 | Auxiliary patrol, returned Jan 1940 |
| HMT Irma Alice | 1940 | Auxiliary patrol, returned 1945 |
| HMT Ironaxe | 1940 | Salvage vessel returned 1945 |
| HMT Irvana | Feb 1940 | Minesweeper, bombed off Great Yarmouth 16 Jan 1942 |
| HMT Isabel | 1940 | Minesweeper, returned 1945 |
| HMT Istria | Sep 1939 | Anti-submarine, sold 1946 |

== J ==
| Ship designation | Requisitioned | Fate |
|---|---|---|
| HMT Jacinta | May 1940 | Auxiliary patrol, Minesweeper, WDV, sold May 1946 |
| HMT Jacketa | Nov 1939 | Minesweeper, returned Mar 1946 |
| HMT Jack Eve | Nov 1939 | Minesweeper, returned Nov 1945 |
| HMT Jack George | 1942 | Water carrier, returned 1945 |
| HMT Jacqueline Clasine | 1940 | Minesweeper, Esso, returned Feb 1946 |
| HMT Jacqueline Florimonde | 1940 | Harbour service, returned 1945 |
| HMT Jacques Morgand | Jun 1940 | Auxiliary patrol, returned 1945 |
| HMT James Barrie | Jan 1940 | Boom defence vessel, returned Nov 1945 |
| HMT James Cosgrove | Oct 1939 | Minesweeper, Boom gate vessel, returned 1946 |
| HMT James Lay | Sep 1939 | Minesweeper, returned Oct 1944 |
| HMT Jay | 1940 | Motor launch, Sandmartin 1944, sold 1947 |
| HMT Jan De Waele | Sep 1940 | Boom defence vessel, returned Dec 1945 |
| HMT Jardine | Aug 1939 | Anti-submarine, bombed off Norway 30 Apr 1940 |
| HMT Jean Edmunds | Jan 1940 | Minesweeper, returned Sep 1945 |
| HMT Jean Frederic | Nov 1940 | Minesweeper, bombed off start point 1 May 1941 |
| HMT Jeanne D'Arc | Jul 1940 | Auxiliary patrol, balloon barrage vessel, returned 1945 |
| HMT Jeanne Et Genevieve | 1940 | Kite balloon vessel, returned 1945 |
| HMT Jeanne Howie | May 1940 | Boom defence vessel, returned 1945 |
| HMT Jeanne Leask | Nov 1939 | Minesweeper, returned 1944 |
| HMT Jeannie Mackay | 1940 | Auxiliary patrol, returned Jan 1946 |
| HMT Jeanne Mackintosh | 1940 | Minesweeper, auxiliary patrol, returned Feb 1946 |
| HMT Jeannine | Jun 1940 | Balloon barrage vessel, returned 1945 |
| HMT Jean Ribault | Jul 1940 | Minesweeper, mooring vessel 1945, returned 1945 |
| HMT Jeloy | Apr 1941 | Minesweeper, Levanter 1942, returned Aug 1946 |
| HMT Jennifer | Apr 1940 | Minesweeper, auxiliary patrol, returned 1942 |
| HMT Jenny Irvin | Nov 1939 | Minesweeper, returned 1946 |
| HMT Jessie Tait | May 1940 | Balloon barrage vessel, RDF, Training ship, returned 1945 |
| HMT Jewel | 1940 | Minesweeper, mined off Belfast Lough 18 May 1941 |
| HMT Jocelyn | 1940 | Auxiliary patrol, returned 1945 |
| HMT Johannesburg | Aug 1942 | Minesweeper, returned Apr 1946 |
| HMT John & Nora | Dec 1939 | Minesweeper, returned 1945 |
| HMT John Alfred | Nov 1939 | Minesweeper, Auxiliary patrol, returned 1945 |
| HMT John Baptish | Sep 1939 | Minesweeper, returned Nov 1939 |
| HMT John Cattling | Aug 1939 | Minesweeper, returned Jul 1945 |
| HMT John Fitzgerald | Jan 1940 | Boom defence vessel, returned Jan 1946 |
| HMT John Herd | 1941 | Harbour service, returned 1945 |
| HMT John Stephen | Jan 1940 | Minesweeper, returned Nov 1945 |
| HMT John Watt | 1941 | Harbour service, returned 1945 |
| HMT John Williamson | Aug 1941 | Minesweeper, Royal Hellenic Navy Alfeios 1943 |
| HMT John Willment | 1941 | Minesweeper, returned 1944 |
| HMT Jordanes | Aug 1940 | Balloon barrage vessel, Auxiliary patrol 1944, returned Oct 1945 |
| HMT Joseph Button | Aug 1939 | Minesweeper, mined off Aldburgh 22 Oct 1940 |
| HMT Joseph Duhamel | Dec 1940 | Anti-submarine, MoWT, returned 1945 |
| HMT J. T. Hendry | 1940 | Balloon barrage vessel, returned 1944 |
| HMT Junco | Dec 1940 | Minesweeper, target service, returned May 1946 |
| HMT Jun Rose | Oct 1939 | Minesweeper, returned May 1945 |
| HMT Justified | 1940 | Minesweeper, mined off Malta 16 Jun 1942 |
| HMT Justifier | Dec 1939 | Minesweeper, returned Jan 1946 |

== K ==
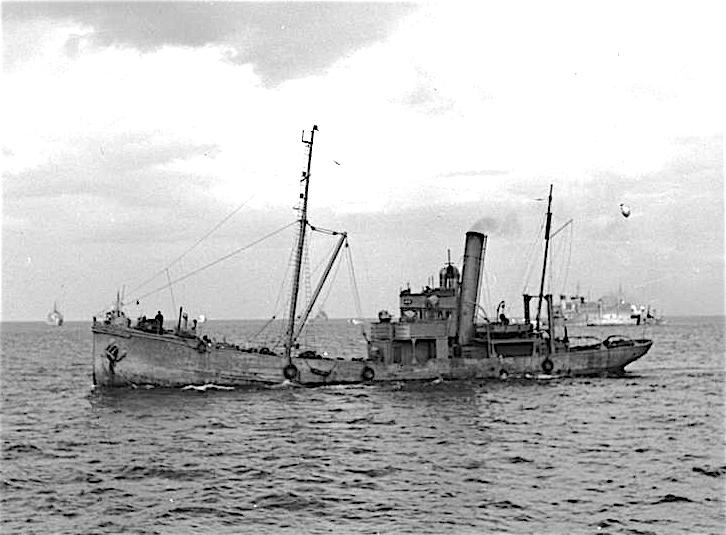
HMT King Lear

| Ship designation | Requisitioned | Fate |
|---|---|---|
| HMT Kai | Jul 1940 | Minesweeper, returned May 1946 |
| HMT Kaiwaka | 1940 | Dan layer, returned 1946 |
| HMT Kapuni | 1941 | Minesweeper, returned 1945 |
| HMT Karmoy | Apr 1941 | Minesweeper, Fiery Cross 1944, returned Aug 1946 |
| HMT Kastoria | May 1940 | Auxiliary patrol, Minesweeper, returned Apr 1946 |
| HMT Katherine | Mar 1940 | Minesweeper, returned 1946 |
| HMT Kathleen | Nov 1939 | Minesweeper, returned 1943 |
| HMT Kelt | Sep 1939 | Anti-submarine, sold 1945 |
| HMT Kennymore | Nov 1939 | Minesweeper, mined, Thames Estuary 25 Nov 1940 |
| HMT Kerneval | Apr 1944 | Esso. returned Nov 1944 |
| HMT Keryado | Jul 1940 | Minesweeper, mined in the Channel 6 Mar 1941 |
| HMT Kiddaw | Dec 1939 | Balloon barrage vessel, returned Jul 1945 |
| HMT Kindred Star | Dec 1939 | Minesweeper, returned Feb 1946 |
| HMT King Emperor | Feb 1940 | Minesweeper, store carrier, returned Jan 1946 |
| HMT King Henry | May 1940 | Towing duties, returned Oct 1945 |
| HMT King Lear | Sep 1939 | Anti-submarine, returned Dec 1945 |
| HMT King Sol | Sep 1939 | Minesweeper, returned Sep 1945 |
| HMT Kingscourt | Nov 1939 | Auxiliary patrol, Minesweeper, returned Sep 1946 |
| HMT Kings Grey | Aug 1939 | Armed boarding vessel, Anti-submarine, returned Jan 1946 |
| HMT Kingston Agate | Sep 1939 | Anti-submarine, lost 10 Jan 1940 |
| HMT Kingston Alalite | Sep 1939 | Anti-submarine, returned Feb 1946 |
| HMT Kingston Amber | Sep 1939 | Anti-submarine, sold 1945 |
| HMT Kingston Andalusite | Aug 1939 | Armed boarding vessel, anti-submarine, lost 25 Dec 1943 |
| HMT Kingston Beryl | Sep 1939 | Anti-submarine, mined north of Ireland 18 Oct 1940 |
| HMT Kingston Cairngorm | Sep 1939 | Anti-submarine, United States Navy, mined in the Channel 15 Jun 1942 |
| HMT Kingston Ceylonite | Sep 1939 | Anti-submarine, returned Mar 1945 |
| HMT Kingston Chrysoberyl | Sep 1939 | Anti-submarine, returned Sep 1945 |
| HMT Kingston Chrysolite | Aug 1939 | Anti submarine, lost 5 Jan 1940 |
| HMT Kingston Coral | Sep 1939 | Anti-submarine, returned Mar 1945 |
| HMT Kingston Cornelian | Aug 1939 | Anti submarine, returned Sep 1945 |
| HMT Kingston Crystal | Sep 1939 | Anti-submarine, lost 27 Apr 1940 |
| HMT Kingston Cyanite | Sep 1939 | Armed boarding vessel, lost 12 Jan 1943 |
| HMT Kingston Galena | Aug 1939 | Anti-submarine, bombed off Dover 1945 |
| HMT Kingston Jacinth | Aug 1939 | Armed boarding vessel, mined off Portsmouth 21 Jan 1943 |
| HMT Kingston Olivine | Aug 1939 | Anti-submarine, sold 1945 |
| HMT Kingston Onyx | Aug 1939 | Armed boarding vessel, Anti-submarine, returned Sep 1944 |
| HMT Kingston Peridot | Aug 1939 | Armed boarding vessel, Anti-submarine, returned Dec 1945 |
| HMT Kingston Sapphire | Sep 1939 | Armed boarding vessel, sunk by the Italian submarine Nani off Gibraltar 5 Oct 1940 |
| HMT Kingston Topaz | Aug 1939 | Armed boarding vessel, Anti-submarine, returned Nov 1945 |
| HMT Kingston Turquoise | Aug 1939 | Armed boarding vessel, returned Nov 1945 |
| HMT Kingsway | Nov 1939 | Auxiliary patrol, returned Jan 1940 |
| HMT Kiritona | 1942 | De-gaussing, returned 1946 |
| HMT Kirkella | Sep 1939 | Anti-submarine, sold 1946 |
| HMT Kitty George | Dec 1940 | Water boat, returned 1946 |
| HMT Klo | Mar 1941 | Anti-submarine, returned Oct 1946 |
| HMT Kommetjie | Nov 1940 | Minesweeper, returned Mar 1946 |
| HMT Koning Albert | Aug 1940 | Balloon barrage vessel, returned Sep 1945 |
| HMT Kopanes | 1940 | Auxiliary patrol, bombed off the Tyne 19 Apr 1941 |
| HMT Korab I | Dec 1940 | Exam, returned 1946 |
| HMT Koralen | Oct 1940 | Auxiliary patrol, United States Navy, returned Jul 1945 |
| HMT Korowa | Sep 1939 | Minesweeper, returned 1946 |
| HMT Kos XVI | Jul 1940 | Anti-submarine, lost in collision, North Sea 24 Aug 1941 |
| HMT Kos XXII | Sep 1940 | Anti-submarine, bombed in the Mediterranean 2 Jun 1941 |
| HMT Kos XXIII | Sep 1940 | Anti-submarine, scuttled in Souda Bay May 1941 |
| HMT Krugersdorp | Jun 1941 | Minesweeper, returned May 1946 |
| HMT Kunishi | Aug 1939 | Minesweeper, sold Apr 1946 |
| HMT Kurd | 1939 | Minesweeper, Mined off the Lizard 10 Jul 1945 |
| HMT Kuroki | Jan 1940 | Boom defence vessel, returned 1946 |
| HMT Kuvera | Jul 1940 | Auxiliary patrol, returned Sep 1945 |

== L ==
| Ship designation | Requisitioned | Fate |
|---|---|---|
| HMT Lacennia | 1939 | Minesweeper, returned Feb 1946 |
| HMT Lacerta | Jun 1940 | Auxiliary patrol, Minesweeper, sold Feb 1946 |
| HMT Lady Beryl | Sep 1939 | Anti-submarine, sold 1945 |
| HMT Lady Eleanor | 1940 | Boom defence vessel, sold Jan 1947 |
| HMT Lady Elsa | Sep 1939 | Anti-submarine, United States Navy, sold 1945 |
| HMT Lady Enid | Aug 1939 | Minesweeper, returned 1945 |
| HMT Lady Estelle | 1940 | Anti-submarine, returned 1945 |
| HMT Lady Hogarth | 1939 | Auxiliary patrol, anti-submarine, returned 1945 |
| HMT Lady Lillian | 1940 | Anti-submarine, bombed west of Ireland 16 Mar 1941 |
| HMT Lady Madeline | 1940 | Anti-submarine, returned Feb 1946 |
| HMT Lady Philomena | Aug 1939 | Anti-submarine, returned Oct 1945 |
| HMT Lady Rosemary | 1940 | Anti-submarine, auxiliary patrol, returned 1946 |
| HMT Lady Shirley | 1939 | Auxiliary patrol, sunk by U-374 near Gibraltar 11 Dec 1941 |
| HMT Lady Stanley | 1940 | Auxiliary patrol, returned 1945 |
| HMT Lanner | Nov 1939 | Minesweeper, returned Feb 1946 |
| HMT Lapageria | Sep 1940 | Auxiliary patrol, fuel tanker, returned Feb 1946 |
| HMT L'Appel De La Mer | Aug 1940 | Auxiliary patrol, returned 1945 |
| HMT Lapwing | Nov 1939 | Auxiliary patrol, returned Jan 1940 |
| HMT Larsen | Jan 1940 | Minesweeper, returned Apr 1946 |
| HMT Larwood | Aug 1939 | Anti-submarine, lost 25 Apr 1940, salved & German VPG 111 |
| HMT Lasher | 1941 | Harbour service, returned Feb 1946 |
| HMT Lassie Main | May 1940 | Balloon barrage vessel, base ship Quebec, returned Jul 1944 |
| HMT L'Atlantique | Jul 1940 | Anti-submarine, returned Apr 1946 |
| HMT Lavatera | Apr 1940 | Balloon barrage vessel, returned 1946 |
| HMT Laverock | May 1940 | Boom defence vessel, sold Mar 1946 |
| HMT Lavinia L | Dec 1939 | Balloon barrage vessel, lost 5 Jun 1941 |
| HMT Lea Rig | 1940 | Auxiliary patrol, Fox II 1944, returned 1945 |
| HMT Leeds United | Sep 1939 | Anti-submarine, sold 1945 |
| HMT Le Flibustier | 1940 | Minesweeper, returned 1945 |
| HMT Leicester City | Sep 1939 | Anti-submarine, returned Mar 1946 |
| HMT Lemnos | 1940 | Harbour service, returned 1945 |
| HMT Le Nivose | 1940 | Auxiliary patrol, returned 1945 |
| HMT Leo | Nov 1939 | Auxiliary patrol, returned Feb 1940 |
| HMT Leonora | Nov 1939 | Attached Fleet Air Arm |
| HMT Le Tiger | Dec 1939 | Anti-submarine, sold Oct 1945 |
| HMT Lephreto | Aug 1939 | Minesweeper, Esso, returned 1945 |
| HMT Lerina | 1941 | Auxiliary patrol, sold 1946 |
| HMT Leyland | Sep 1939 | Anti-submarine, lost in collision off Gibraltar 25 Nov 1942 |
| HMT Liberator | May 1940 | Minesweeper, returned 1945 |
| HMT Liberia | 1940 | Minesweeper, returned Jul 1946 |
| HMT Libra | 1940 | Minesweeper, returned 1945 |
| HMT Libyan | 1940 | Minesweeper, Esso, returned 1945 |
| HMT Lichen | Nov 1939 | Minesweeper, returned 1945 |
| HMT Liddock | Mar 1940 | Dan layer, auxiliary patrol, returned Dec 1941 |
| HMT Ligny | Sep 1940 | Minesweeper, returned Nov 1945 |
| HMT Lilium | 1941 | De-gaussing, returned Jan 1946 |
| HMT Lilly Oak | 1940 | Auxiliary patrol, returned 1945 |
| HMT Lincoln City | Sep 1939 | Anti-submarine, bombed off the Faroes 21 Feb 1941 |
| HMT Lincolshire | Sep 1939 | Anti-submarine, returned Sep 1945 |
| HMT L'Istrac | 1939 | Auxiliary patrol, sunk by gunfire in the Channel 11 Oct 1940 |
| HMT Lizzie Birrel | Nov 1939 | Minesweeper, returned Apr 1946 |
| HMT Lizzie Flett | 1940 | Auxiliary patrolled, returned 1944 |
| HMT Lizzie West | 1941 | Auxiliary patrol, returned 1945 |
| HMT Loch Alsh | Sep 1940 | Minesweeper, bombed off the Humber 30 Jan 1942 |
| HMT Loch Assater | 1939 | Minesweeper, mined off east Scotland 22 Mar 1940 |
| HMT Loch Blair | Jun 1940 | Auxiliary patrol, returned Feb 1946 |
| HMT Loch Buie | Aug 1939 | Minesweeper, returned Mar 1946 |
| HMT Loch Doon | Aug 1939 | Minesweeper, mined off Blyth 25 Dec 1939 |
| HMT Loch Eribol | Sep 1939 | Minesweeper, lost in collision with SS Sidney Sharman off Start Point 12 Oct 1945 |
| HMT Loch Esk | Nov 1939 | Minesweeper, returned 1943 |
| HMT Loch Hope | Jun 1940 | Auxiliary patrol, returned Dec 1945 |
| HMT Loch Inver | May 1940 | Auxiliary patrol, mined off Harwich 24 Sep 1940 |
| HMT Loch Laggan | Sep 1939 | Boom defence vessel, returned May 1945 |
| HMT Loch Leven | Aug 1939 | Minesweeper, returned Feb 1946 |
| HMT Loch Long | Mar 1940 | Boom defence vessel, sold Feb 1946 |
| HMT Loch Melfort | Aug 1939 | Anti-submarine, sold Feb 1946 |
| HMT Loch Moidart | Jun 1940 | Auxiliary patrol, Minesweepers, returned Jan 1946 |
| HMT Loch Monteith | Sep 1939 | Anti-submarine, submarine tender, returned Nov 1945 |
| HMT Loch Naver | Aug 1939 | Minesweeper, lost 6 May 1940 |
| HMT Loch Nevis | 1940 | Motor launch, returned 1944 |
| HMT Loch Oskaig | Aug 1939 | Anti-submarine, returned Nov 1945 |
| HMT Loch Park | Jun 1940 | Minesweeper, returned Aug 1945 |
| HMT Loch Rannock | Jan 1940 | Minesweeper, returned Nov 1945 |
| HMT Loch Shin | Sep 1939 | Boom defence vessel, bombed at Harstad, Norway 25 May 1940 |
| HMT Loch Tulla | Sep 1939 | Anti-submarine, sold Jan 1946 |
| HMT Lois | Feb 1940 | Minesweeper, returned Nov 1944 |
| HMT Lombard | May 1940 | Auxiliary patrol, Minesweeper, returned Nov 1945 |
| HMT Longscar | Aug 1939 | Exam, returned 1946 |
| HMT Loon | Mar 1940 | Balloon barrage vessel, water carrier, returned Dec 1945 |
| HMT Loos | 1940 | Boom gate vessel, returned 1945 |
| HMT L'Orage | Nov 1940 | Special service, MoWT Jul 1942 |
| HMT Lord Anson | Aug 1939 | Harbour service, returned Feb 1946 |
| HMT Lord Ashfield | Sep 1939 | Minesweeper, returned Dec 1945 |
| HMT Lord Austin | Sep 1939 | Anti-submarine, mined off Normandy 26 Jun 1944 |
| HMT Lord Barham | Nov 1939 | Minesweeper, returned Oct 1945 |
| HMT Lord Beaconsfield | Aug 1939 | Minesweeper, auxiliary patrol, Minesweeper, wrecked Oct 1945 |
| HMT Lord Cavan | Nov 1939 | Mine recovery vessel, sunk by gunfire off Dunkirk 2 Jun 1940 |
| HMT Lord Cecil | Nov 1939 | Auxiliary patrol, returned Jan 1940 |
| HMT Lord Collingwood | Apr 1940 | Auxiliary patrol, returned 1945 |
| HMT Lord Curzon | Sep 1939 | Store carrier, returned Feb 1946 |
| HMT Lord Darling | Aug 1940 | Minesweeper, Exam, returned Sep 1944 |
| HMT Lord Dunwich | Sep 1940 | Exam, returned Mar 1946 |
| HMT Lord Essenden | Sep 1939 | Anti-submarine, returned Oct 1945 |
| HMT Lord Gainford | Dec 1939 | Boom defence vessel, returned 1946 |
| HMT Lord Grey | Aug 1939 | Minesweeper, returned Mar 1946 |
| HMT Lord Hailsham | Aug 1939 | Anti-submarine, torpedoed by E-boat in the Channel 27 Feb 1943 |
| HMT Lord Hood | Nov 1939 | Minesweeper, returned Aug 1945 |
| HMT Lord Hotham | Sep 1939 | Anti-submarine, sold Sep 1945 |
| HMT Lord Howard | Nov 1940 | Auxiliary patrol, lost in collision off Dover 27 Dec 1940 |
| HMT Lord Howe | Nov 1940 | Flare drifter, Training ship, returned Feb 1946 |
| HMT Lord Inchcape | Aug 1939 | Minesweeper, returned 1945 |
| HMT Lord Irwin | Aug 1939 | Minesweeper, returned Feb 1946 |
| HMT Lord Keith | Sep 1939 | Auxiliary patrol, returned Dec 1945 |
| HMT Lord Lloyd | Aug 1939 | Anti-submarine, sold 1945 |
| HMT Lord Melchett | Aug 1939 | Minesweeper, returned Apr 1946 |
| HMT Lord Middleton | Aug 1939 | Anti-submarine, returned 1945 |
| HMT Lord Northcliffe | Nov 1939 | Balloon barrage vessel, returned Nov 1945 |
| HMT Lord Nuffield | Sep 1939 | Anti-submarine, returned Dec 1945 |
| HMT Lord Plender | Aug 1939 | Anti-submarine, sold 1946 |
| HMT Lord Rodney | Sep 1939 | Minesweeper, returned Feb 1946 |
| HMT Lord St. Vincent | Sep 1939 | Auxiliary patrol, balloon barrage vessel, mined, Thames Estuary 7 Jul 1941 |
| HMT Lord Selborne | Jun 1940 | Auxiliary patrol, mined in the Humber 31 Mar 1941 |
| HMT Lord Snowden | Aug 1939 | Anti-submarine, lost in collision off Falmouth 13 Apr 1942 |
| HMT Lord Stamp | Aug 1939 | Anti-submarine, mined in the Channel 14 Oct 1940 |
| HMT Lord Stanhope | Aug 1939 | Anti-submarine, returned Nov 1945 |
| HMT Lord Stonehaven | Aug 1939 | Anti-submarine, torpedoed by E-boat off the Eddystone 2 Oct 1942 |
| HMT Lord Suffolk | Dec 1939 | Auxiliary patrol, returned 1943 |
| HMT Lord Wakefield | Aug 1939 | Anti-submarine, bombed off Normandy 29 Jul 1944 |
| HMT Lorinda | Sep 1939 | Minesweeper, lost by fire at Freetown 28 Aug 1941 |
| HMT Lorraine | Jun 1940 | Auxiliary patrol, Minesweeper, returned Jan 1946 |
| HMT Louis Botha | Jun 1940 | Auxiliary patrol, wrecked south of Reykjavík 7 Mar 1944 |
| HMT Louise Et Marie | Jul 1940 | Minesweeper, returned Jan 1946 |
| HMT Lovania | Jun 1940 | Auxiliary patrol, sold Feb 1946 |
| HMT Lowther | Feb 1940 | Minesweeper, returned Jan 1946 |
| HMT Loyal Friend | Dec 1939 | Anti-submarine, returned Aug 1945 |
| HMT Lucien Goujy | Jul 1940 | Minesweeper, lost, cause unknown? 21 Feb 1945 |
| HMT Lucienne Jeanne | Apr 1941 | Minesweeper, stranded & abandoned, Nore area 24 Oct 1941 |
| HMT Luda Lady | Nov 1939 | Minesweeper, mined off the East Coast 22 Jan 1941 |
| HMT Luda Lord | Nov 1939 | Minesweeper, store carrier, returned Nov 1944 |
| HMT Luminary | Sep 1940 | Boom defence vessel, sold Dec 1946 |
| HMT Lune | Sep 1939 | Minesweeper, Wreck dispersal vessel, sold Jul 1946 |
| HMT Lurcher | 1941 | Anti-submarine, returned 1946 |
| HMT Lydia Long | 1940 | Auxiliary patrol, returned 1945 |
| HMT Lydiard | Sep 1939 | Anti-submarine, sold Feb 1946 |

== M ==
| Ship designation | Requisitioned | Fate |
|---|---|---|
| HMT Mace | Aug 1939 | Harbour service, returned 1945 |
| HMT M. A. West | 1940 | Exam, lost 14 May 1941 |
| HMT Maaloy | Apr 1940 | Minesweeper, sunk by U-510 off Ceylon 27 Mar 1944 |
| HMT Madden | Feb 1940 | Minesweeper, wreck dispersal vessel, returned Apr 1946 |
| HMT Maggie Gault | Jun 1940 | Harbour service, returned Apr 1945 |
| HMT Maida | Nov 1939 | Minesweeper, mined off the East Coast 16 Mar 1940 |
| HMT Majesty | Mar 1940 | Minesweeper, auxiliary patrol, returned Sep 1946 |
| HMT Malacolite | Aug 1939 | Minesweeper, returned Sep 1945 |
| HMT Mandal | Jul 1940 | Minesweeper, returned 1946 |
| HMT Manor | Aug 1939 | Anti-submarine, torpedoed by E-boat in the Channel 9 Jul 1942 |
| HMT Man O'War | Aug 1939 | Anti-submarine, sold 1945 |
| HMT Manx Prince | Dec 1939 | Minesweeper, mined off the Humber 28 Nov 1940 |
| HMT Marano | Nov 1939 | Minesweeper, returned Jan 1945 |
| HMT Marcel Pierre | Jul 1940 | Auxiliary patrol, returned 1945 |
| HMT Marcia | Mar 1940 | Balloon barrage vessel, returned 1944 |
| HMT Marconi | Feb 1940 | Minesweeper, lost in collision off Harwich 20 Sep 1941 |
| HMT Mare | Nov 1939 | Minesweeper, returned Oct 1945 |
| HMT Maretta | Sep 1939 | Minesweeper, returned Nov 1945 |
| HMT Margaret Hide | Nov 1939 | Minesweeper, returned Apr 1945 |
| HMT Margaret Rose | May 1940 | Minesweeper, returned 1946 |
| HMT Marguerita | Nov 1939 | Harbour service, returned Oct 1945 |
| HMT Maria | May 1941 | Wrech dispersal vessel, sold 1950 |
| HMT Maria Elizabeth | 1940 | Minesweeper, Esso, returned 1945 |
| HMT Maria R. Ommering | 1940 | Minesweeper, returned Feb 1946 |
| HMT Marie Elena | Aug 1940 | Minesweeper, returned 1944 |
| HMT Marie Louise | Aug 1940 | Boom defence vessel, returned Jan 1946 |
| HMT Marigold II | Aug 1939 | Harbour service, returned 1945 |
| HMT Maris Stella | Jul 1940 | Boom gate vessel, returned 1945 |
| HMT Maris Stella | Jul 1940 | Auxiliary patrol, returned 1945 |
| HMT Marjorie M. Hastie | Jun 1940 | Minesweeper, returned 1945 |
| HMT Marsona | Oct 1939 | Minesweeper, mined off Cromarty 4 Aug 1940 |
| HMT Mary A. Hastie | Nov 1939 | Minesweeper, auxiliary patrol, returned 1945 |
| HMT Mary A. Purdy | Feb 1940 | Balloon barrage vessel, returned Oct 1944 |
| HMT Mary Cam | 1941 | Boom defence vessel, sold May 1948 |
| HMT Mary Herd | May 1940 | Water carrier, returned Oct 1945 |
| HMT Mary J. Masson | May 1940 | Mobile wiping unit, returned 1946 |
| HMT Mary Sturgeon | Mar 1940 | Auxiliary patrol, returned 1945 |
| HMT Mary Swanston | Oct 1939 | Harbour service, returned Oct 1945 |
| HMT Mary Watt | 1941 | Harbour service, returned 1946 |
| HMT Mary White | Jan 1940 | Boom defence vessel, returned Feb 1946 |
| HMT Masona | Dec 1939 | Boom defence vessel, scrapped, Jun 1947 |
| HMT Massabielle | Sep 1940 | Air/sea rescue, returned 1945 |
| HMT Mastiff | 1941 | Anti-submarine, returned 1945 |
| HMT Mathhilde Simonne | Oct 1940 | Auxiliary patrol, mobile wiping unit, returned Apr 1946 |
| HMT Meander | 1940 | Auxiliary patrol, returned 1946 |
| HMT Melbourne | Sep 1939 | Anti-submarine, bombed off Narvik 22 May 1940 |
| HMT Memento | 1940 | Minesweeper, returned 1945 |
| HMT Merbreeze | Nov 1939 | Minesweeper, returned 1946 |
| HMT Meror | Sep 1940 | Minesweeper, mined off the Humber 3 Oct 1943 |
| HMT Mewslade | Mar 1940 | Minesweeper, returned Apr 1946 |
| HMT M. H. Buchan | Aug 1939 | Harbour service, returned 1946 |
| HMT M. H. Stephan | Nov 1939 | Exam fire float, returned Dec 1944 |
| HMT Michael Griffith | Aug 1939 | Minesweeper, returned Jan 1945 |
| HMT Midas | Feb 1940 | Flare drifter, Balloon barrage vessel, lost in collision off Dungeness 3 Feb 1941 |
| HMT Mikasa | Dec 1939 | Auxiliary patrol, returned Oct 1944 |
| HMT Mildenhall | Sep 1939 | Anti-submarine, French L'Ajaccienne 1939 |
| HMT Milford Countess | Aug 1939 | Minesweeper, returned Apr 1946 |
| HMT Milford Duchess | Aug 1939 | Minesweeper, returned Dec 1944 |
| HMT Milford Duke | Aug 1939 | Boom defence vessel, returned Nov 1945 |
| HMT Milford Earl | Aug 1939 | Minesweeper, bombed East of Scotland 8 Dec 1941 |
| HMT Milford King | Dec 1939 | Minesweeper, store carrier, returned Nov 1945 |
| HMT Milford Prince | Aug 1939 | Minesweeper, returned Dec 1945 |
| HMT Milford Princess | Sep 1939 | Minesweeper, returned Sep 1945 |
| HMT Milford Queen | Aug 1939 | Minesweeper, returned Dec 1945 |
| HMT Mill O'Buckie | Sep 1939 | Harbour service, returned 1945 |
| HMT Millwater | Jun 1940 | Balloon barrage vessel, exam, auxiliary patrol, returned 1945 |
| HMT Mint | Nov 1939 | Water carrier, returned 1946 |
| HMT Mirabelle | Nov 1939 | Auxiliary patrol, Esso, lost in collision 17 Sep 1944 |
| HMT Mitres | Jun 1940 | Auxiliary patrol, salvage vessel, returned Nov 1945 |
| HMT Moed En Werk | Jun 1940 | Dan layer, returned 1945 |
| HMT Molde | Jul 1940 | Anti-submarine, Minesweeper, returned 1946 |
| HMT Monarda | Nov 1939 | Minesweeper, foundered, Thames Estuary 8 Nov 1941 |
| HMT Monimia | Aug 1939 | Minesweeper, returned Nov 1945 |
| HMT Monique Andre | Jul 1940 | Minesweeper, returned Jan 1946 |
| HMT Monique Camille | Aug 1940 | Minesweeper, returned Mar 1945 |
| HMT Montano | 1940 | Auxiliary patrol, Minesweeper, returned Jan 1946 |
| HMT Mooivlet | Nov 1939 | Anti-submarine, returned Mar 1945 |
| HMT Moonlight | Jan 1940 | Store carrier, returned 1945 |
| HMT Moonrise | Mar 1940 | Minesweeper, Boom gate vessel, sold May 1946 |
| HMT Moonshine | 1940 | Minesweeper, sold Jan 1945 |
| HMT Moravia | Jun 1940 | Minesweeper, auxiliary patrol, mined, North Sea 14 Mar 1943 |
| HMT Moray | 1940 | Dan layer, store carrier, foundered off Milford Haven 13 Mar 1943 |
| HMT Moray Rose | Aug 1939 | Harbour service, returned 1945 |
| HMT Moray View | Mar 1940 | Hospital drifter, returned Feb 1946 |
| HMT Morgan Jones | Jun 1940 | Auxiliary patrol, returned Apr 1945 |
| HMT Morven Hill | Oct 1940 | Examination service, returned Mar 1946 |
| HMT Moss | 1941 | Anti-submarine, training, returned 1945 |
| HMT Mount Ard | Sep 1939 | Boom defence vessel, returned Apr 1945 |
| HMT Mount Keen | Aug 1939 | Minesweeper, returned Apr 1945 |
| HMT Murmansk | Aug 1939 | Minesweeper, wrecked at Brest 17 Jun 1940 |
| HMT Muroto | Aug 1939 | Minesweeper, returned Jan 1944 |
| HMT Musk Rose | Jul 1940 | Exam, sold 1946 |
| HMT Myrland | Apr 1941 | Minesweeper, returned 1946 |

== N ==
| Ship designation | Requisitioned | Fate |
|---|---|---|
| HMT Nab Wyke | Aug 1939 | Minesweeper, returned Mar 1946 |
| HMT Nadine | 1940 | Minesweeper, returned 1945 |
| HMT Nairnside | 1939 | Minesweeper, harbour service, returned 1945 |
| HMT Namur | May 1940 | Auxiliary patrol, Boom defence vessel, Palisade 1944, sold 1946 |
| HMT Nancy Hague | Mar 1940 | Boom defence vessel, returned 1946 |
| HMT Narvik | Oct 1940 | Anti-submarine, Minesweeper, returned 1945 |
| HMT Natal II | Nov 1939 | Boom gate vessel, returned 1945 |
| HMT Natalia | Apr 1940 | Minesweeper, returned Jun 1946 |
| HMT Nautilus | 1939 | Dan layer, lost by unknown cause at Dunkirk 29 May 1940 |
| HMT Nautilus | 1942 | Minesweeper, RDF calibrating, returned 1946 |
| HMT Nazareth | Jul 1940 | Minesweeper, returned 1945 |
| HMT Nebb | 1940 | Minesweeper, Dan layer, returned 1945 |
| HMT Nebula | 1941 | Minesweeper, returned 1946 |
| HMT Negro | Oct 1939 | Minesweeper, returned Feb 1945 |
| HMT Neil Mackay | Oct 1939 | Anti-submarine, returned 1945 |
| HMT Neil Smith | Aug 1939 | Minesweeper, returned 1944 |
| HMT Nerine | Dec 1925 | Minesweeper, returned Oct 1944 |
| HMT Netsukis | Nov 1939 | Auxiliary patrol, TRV, returned Apr 1946 |
| HMT New Comet | Nov 1939 | Minesweeper, store carrier, returned Dec 1945 |
| HMT Newhaven N.B. | Feb 1940 | Minesweeper, returned Feb 1945 |
| HMT Newland | May 1940 | Minesweeper, returned Jul 1940 |
| HMT New Spray | 1940 | Balloon barrage vessel, foundered off Sheerness 3 Jan 1941 |
| HMT Niblick | Jun 1940 | Auxiliary patrol, water carrier, Minesweeper, returned Aug 1945 |
| HMT Nigel | Mar 1941 | Minesweeper, returned May 1946 |
| HMT Night Hawk | Feb 1940 | Minesweeper, returned Aug 1946 |
| HMT Night Rider | Jan 1940 | Boom defence vessel, sold Feb 1947 |
| HMT Nimbus | Nov 1941 | Minesweeper, returned Feb 1946 |
| HMT Noble Nora | 1940 | Minesweeper, RHN Spercheios Sep 1943, lost 3 Apr 1945 |
| HMT Nodzu | Sep 1939 | Minesweeper, returned Nov 1945 |
| HMT Nogi | Aug 1939 | Minesweeper, bombed off Norfolk 23 Jun 1941 |
| HMT Noonday | 1941 | Auxiliary patrol, returned Apr 1946 |
| HMT Nora Niven | Oct 1942 | Dan layer, returned Feb 1944 |
| HMT Norbreeze | Oct 1939 | Net-layer, returned Jan 1946 |
| HMT Nordhav II | Apr 1940 | Minesweeper, sunk by U-714 off Dundee 10 Mar 1945 |
| HMT Nordland | Feb 1940 | Boom defence vessel, returned 1946 |
| HMT Norfolk County | 1941 | Target service, returned 1945 |
| HMT Norina | Jan 1940 | Boom defence vessel, sold May 1947 |
| HMT Norlan | 1940 | Boom defence vessel, returned 1945 |
| HMT Norland | May 1940 | Auxiliary patrol, minesweeper, returned Oct 1945 |
| HMT Norman Wilson | Nov 1939 | Balloon barrage vessel, returned Sep 1946 |
| HMT Norse | Aug 1939 | Minesweeper, returned Nov 1944 |
| HMT North Esk | Oct 1939 | Harbour service, returned Dec 1945 |
| HMT North Haven | 1941 | Harbour service, returned 1945 |
| HMT North Ness | May 1940 | Auxiliary patrol, returned Jul 1946 |
| HMT Northcoates | Aug 1939 | Minesweeper, foundered in tow in the Channel 2 Dec 1944 |
| HMT Northern Chief | Aug 1939 | Armed boarding vessel, anti-submarine, United States Navy, returned Feb 1946 |
| HMT Northern Dawn | Aug 1939 | Anti-submarine United States Navy, returned Feb 1946 |
| HMT Northern Duke | Sep 1939 | Armed boarding vessel, anti-submarine, returned Jan 1946 |
| HMT Northern Foam | Aug 1939 | Armed boarding vessel, anti-submarine, returned Nov 1945 |
| HMT Northern Gem | Aug 1939 | Anti-submarine, returned Nov 1945 |
| HMT Northern Gift | Sep 1939 | Armed boarding vessel, anti-submarine, returned Oct 1945 |
| HMT Northern Isles | Aug 1939 | Armed boarding vessel, anti-submarine, wrecked off Durban 19 Jan 1945 |
| HMT Northern Light | 1940 | Minesweeper, returned 1946 |
| HMT Northern Pride | Aug 1939 | Anti-submarine, returned Nov 1945 |
| HMT Northern Princess | Sep 1939 | Armed boarding vessel, anti-submarine, sunk by U-94, North Atlantic 7 Mar 1942 |
| HMT Northern Reward | Sep 1939 | Armed boarding vessel, anti-submarine, United States Navy, returned Jan 1946 |
| HMT Northern Rover | Aug 1939 | Armed boarding vessel, sunk by U-59, 30 Oct 1939 |
| HMT Northern Scot | 1941 | Harbour service, returned 1944 |
| HMT Northern Sky | Sep 1939 | Armed boarding vessel, anti-submarine, returned Sep 1945 |
| HMT Northern Spray | Sep 1939 | Anti-submarine, returned Sep 1945 |
| HMT Northern Sun | Sep 1939 | Armed boarding vessel, anti-submarine, returned Dec 1945 |
| HMT Northern Wave | Sep 1939 | Anti-submarine, returned Sep 1945 |
| HMT Northlyn | Oct 1939 | Boom defence vessel, returned Jan 1946 |
| HMT Northman | Jul 1940 | Anti-submarine, returned Mar 1946 |
| HMT Northward | Nov 1939 | Minesweeper, returned Feb 1946 |
| HMT Norwich City | Sep 1939 | Anti-submarine, United States Navy, returned Apr 1946 |
| HMT Notre Dame D'Etel | 1940 | Auxiliary patrol, returned 1945 |
| HMT Notre Dame De France | Oct 1941 | Anti-submarine, returned Dec 1945 |
| HMT Notre Dame De Lourdes | 1940 | Harbour service, returned 1945 |
| HMT Notre Dame De Montligeon | Oct 1940 | Boom gate vessel, returned Oct 1945 |
| HMT Notts County | Sep 1939 | Anti-submarine, sunk by U-701 south of Iceland 8 Mar 1942 |
| HMT Novice | Aug 1940 | Boom defence vessel, returned 1945 |
| HMT Nuevo Caldas | 1942 | Harbour service, returned 1945 |
| HMT Nuevo Mataro | 1942 | Harbour service, returned 1945 |

== O ==
| Ship designation | Requisitioned | Fate |
|---|---|---|
| HMT Oasis | 1940 | Auxiliary patrol, sold 1945 |
| HMT Oaklea | 1939 | Auxiliary patrol, returned 1946 |
| HMT Obtain | Feb 1940 | Harbour service, returned Oct 1945 |
| HMT Ocean Breeze | Sep 1939 | Minesweeper, returned 1944 |
| HMT Ocean Brine | Nov 1939 | Auxiliary patrol, returned Nov 1944 |
| HMT Ocean Eddy | Jan 1940 | Boom defence vessel, returned Feb 1946 |
| HMT Ocean Fisher | Aug 1939 | Exam, returned Aug 1945 |
| HMT Ocean Gain | Dec 1939 | Mobile wiping unit, returned May 1946 |
| HMT Ocean Guide | Dec 1939 | Mobile wiping unit, returned Mar 1946 |
| HMT Ocean Lassie | Aug 1939 | Auxiliary patrol, mined off Harwich 4 Jun 1940 |
| HMT Ocean Lifebuoy | Nov 1939 | Minesweeper, returned Jan 1946 |
| HMT Ocean Lover | Mar 1940 | Minesweeper, Auxiliary patrol, returned 1945 |
| HMT Ocean Lux | Nov 1939 | Minesweeper, returned Sep 1945 |
| HMT Ocean Pearl | 1940 | Harbour service, returned 1945 |
| HMT Ocean Pilot | Sep 1939 | Harbour service, returned Jun 1946 |
| HMT Ocean Pioneer | May 1940 | Mobile wiping unit, returned 1946 |
| HMT Ocean Pride | 1941 | Auxiliary patrol, returned 1945 |
| HMT Ocean Ranger | Nov 1940 | FAA safety vessel, TRV returned 1945 |
| HMT Ocean Retriever | Apr 1940 | Minesweeper, Auxiliary patrol, mined, Thames Estuary 22 Sep 1943 |
| HMT Ocean Reward | Dec 1939 | Minesweeper, lost in collision off Dover 28 May 1940 |
| HMT Ocean Rover | 1940 | TRV, sold 1946 |
| HMT Ocean Scout | Nov 1939 | Minesweeper, torpedo recovery vessel, returned Dec 1945 |
| HMT Ocean Spray | Jan 1940 | Minesweeper, harbour service, returned Jan 1946 |
| HMT Ocean Sprite | Aug 1939 | Harbour service, returned 1945 |
| HMT Ocean Star | Dec 1940 | KBV, returned 1945 |
| HMT Ocean Sunlight | Nov 1939 | Minesweeper, mined off Newhaven 13 Jun 1940 |
| HMT Ocean Swell | Oct 1939 | Boom defence vessel, returned Aug 1945 |
| HMT Ocean Toiler | Apr 1940 | Minesweeper, auxiliary patrol, returned Jan 1946 |
| HMT Ocean Treasure | May 1940 | Minesweeper, auxiliary patrol, returned Mar 1946 |
| HMT Ocean Voctor | Nov 1939 | Auxiliary patrol, returned Feb 1940 |
| HMT Ocean View | Feb 1940 | Minesweeper, returned Dec 1945 |
| HMT Ocean Vim | Sep 1939 | Minesweeper, returned Mar 1946 |
| HMT Ocean's Gift | Jul 1940 | Auxiliary patrol, Mar 1946 |
| HMT Odberg | Apr 1941 | Anti-submarine, returned Jun 1946 |
| HMT Ogano | May 1940 | Minesweeper, returned Jul 1944 |
| HMT Ohm | Aug 1939 | Minesweeper, returned Dec 1945 |
| HMT Okapi | Oct 1940 | Auxiliary patrol, returned Dec 1945 |
| HMT Okino | Jan 1940 | Boom defence vessel, returned Dec 1945 |
| HMT Oksoy | Aug 1941 | Minesweeper, Cyclone 1944, RHN Pinieos 1945, lost 24 Oct 1945 |
| HMT Oku | Aug 1939 | Minesweeper, returned Feb 1945 |
| HMT Olaf I | 1941 | KBV, returned 1945 |
| HMT Olden Times | Nov 1939 | Auxiliary patrol, returned Feb 1940 |
| HMT Olivae | Nov 1939 | Minesweeper, returned Nov 1945 |
| HMT Olive Branch | Nov 1939 | Harbour service, returned 1945 |
| HMT Olive Cam | Sep 1939 | Minesweeper, sold May 1946 |
| HMT Olive Tree | 1940 | Minesweeper, Auxiliary patrol, returned 1945 |
| HMT Olivine | Sep 1939 | Harbour service, returned Dec 1945 |
| HMT Olvina | Aug 1939 | Anti-submarine, returned Dec 1945 |
| HMT Olympia | Dec 1939 | Minesweeper, returned Oct 1945 |
| HMT One Accord | Nov 1939 | Minesweeper, returned 1946 |
| HMT Onetos | Nov 1939 | Minesweeper, wreck dispersal vessel, returned Jan 1946 |
| HMT Onward | Nov 1939 | Minesweeper, returned Nov 1944 |
| HMT Oostewal | Oct 1939 | Minesweeper, returned May 1946 |
| HMT Ophir | 1941 | Boom defence vessel, returned? |
| HMT Oriental Star | Sep 1939 | Anti-submarine, French La Setoise 1939 |
| HMT Orizaba | Aug 1940 | Minesweeper, Esso, returned Dec 1944 |
| HMT Ormonde | Nov 1939 | Minesweeper, bombed East of Scotland 16 Feb 1941 |
| HMT Ornen III | Jan 1940 | Minesweeper, returned Dec 1945 |
| HMT Orpheus | Jun 1940 | Minesweeper, returned Jan 1946 |
| HMT Orvicto | Apr 1940 | Dan layer, auxiliary patrol, returned Oct 1945 |
| HMT Oryx | Jul 1940 | Auxiliary patrol, Gemsbuck 1944, returned 1946 |
| HMT Osako | Feb 1940 | Minesweeper, returned Dec 1945 |
| HMT Oscar Angele | 1940 | Auxiliary patrol, returned 1945 |
| HMT Osta | Nov 1939 | Minesweeper, balloon barrage vessel, returned Nov 1944 |
| HMT Oswaldian | May 1940 | Minesweeper, mined, Bristol Channel 4 Aug 1940 |
| HMT Othello | Nov 1939 | Minesweeper, boom defence vessel, mined in the Humber 11 Apr 1941 |
| HMT Our Bairns | Dec 1939 | Minesweeper, target service, returned Mar 1946 |
| HMT Our Kate | Mar 1940 | Minesweeper, balloon barrage vessel, returned 1945 |
| HMT Outpost | Mar 1943 | Esso, returned Apr 1945 |
| HMT Overdale Wyke | Jul 1939 | Minesweeper, sold 1946 |
| HMT Overfall | Nov 1939 | Minesweeper, target service, returned Oct 1945 |
| HMT Oystermouth Castle | May 1940 | Auxiliary patrol, Minesweeper, returned Jan 1946 |

== P ==
| Ship designation | Requisitioned | Fate |
|---|---|---|
| HMT Packice | Nov 1941 | Minesweeper, returned Sep 1944 |
| HMT Panorama | Jan 1940 | Boom defence vessel, sold Mar 1946 |
| HMT Paradigm | Feb 1940 | Harbour service, returned Mar 1946 |
| HMT Paramount | Nov 1939 | Minesweeper, returned Jan 1946 |
| HMT Patricia Cam | 1941 | Minesweeper, bombed by Japanese aircraft off Wessel Island 22 Jan 1943 |
| HMT Patrie | Aug 1940 | Auxiliary patrol, returned May 1945 |
| HMT Patti | May 1940 | Auxiliary patrol, Minesweeper, returned Jan 1946 |
| HMT Paul Rykens | Nov 1939 | Anti-submarine, returned Dec 1945 |
| HMT Pax | 1940 | Minesweeper, Dan layer, returned 1945 |
| HMT Paxton | Nov 1939 | Flare drifter, bombed at Dunkirk 28 May 1940 |
| HMT Paynter | 1939 | Anti-submarine, returned 1945 |
| HMT Peacemaker | May 1940 | Auxiliary patrol, returned 1945 |
| HMT Pecheur | Oct 1939 | Net layer, returned Jul 1945 |
| HMT Peggy Nutten | Feb 1940 | Auxiliary patrol, balloon barrage vessel, Esso, returned Nov 1944 |
| HMT Peken | Jul 1940 | Minesweeper, returned Aug 1945 |
| HMT Pelagos | May 1940 | Auxiliary patrol, Minesweeper, returned Aug 1945 |
| HMT Pelton | 1939 | Minesweeper, torpedoed by E-boat off Gt. Yarmouth 24 Dec 1940 |
| HMT Pentland Firth | Aug 1939 | Anti-submarine United States Navy 1942, lost in collision off New York 19 Sep 1942 |
| HMT Perdrant | Aug 1940 | Minesweeper, returned 1945 |
| HMT Perfective | Nov 1939 | KBV, returned 1945 |
| HMT Peridot | Aug 1939 | Anti-submarine, mined off Dover 15 Mar 1940 |
| HMT Perilia | Nov 1939 | Minesweeper, returned Feb 1946 |
| HMT Peter Carey | Aug 1939 | Minesweeper, returned Sep 1945 |
| HMT Peter Hendricks | Nov 1939 | Anti-submarine, returned Feb 1946 |
| HMT Phase | Oct 1939 | Minesweeper, returned Feb 1946 |
| HMT Philippe | Apr 1940 | Dan layer, auxiliary patrol, returned Jan 1946 |
| HMT Phineas Beard | Aug 1939 | Minesweeper, bombed East of Scotland 8 Dec 1941 |
| HMT Phrontis | May 1940 | Auxiliary patrol, returned Jan 1946 |
| HMT Phyllis | 1942 | Dan layer, returned 1944 |
| HMT Phyllisia | Dec 1939 | Boom defence vessel, Portuguese 1943–45, returned Jul 1946 |
| HMT Phyllis Rose | Apr 1940 | Auxiliary patrol, returned Nov 1945 |
| HMT Pict | Aug 1939 | Anti-submarine, sold 1945 |
| HMT Picton Castle | Aug 1939 | Minesweeper, returned Dec 1945 |
| HMT Pierre Andre | Jul 1940 | Minesweeper, returned Jan 1946 |
| HMT Pierre Desceliers | Aug 1940 | Auxiliary patrol, boom defence vessel, bombed off Salcombe 13 Aug 1942 |
| HMT Pierre Gustave | Aug 1940 | Minesweeper, returned Mar 1946 |
| HMT Pilot Star | Nov 1939 | Harbour service, returned 1946 |
| HMT Pilot Us | Aug 1939 | Store carrier, returned Mar 1946 |
| HMT Pitstruan | May 1940 | Minesweeper, Esso, returned Nov 1944 |
| HMT Playmates | Oct 1939 | Minesweeper, returned Oct 1945 |
| HMT Plougastel | 1940 | Mine watching, returned 1945 |
| HMT Plough | 1939 | Harbour service, returned 1945 |
| HMT Plough Boy | Nov 1939 | Boom defence vessel, scrapped Jul 1946 |
| HMT Plumber | Nov 1939 | Minesweeper, harbour service, returned Jul 1945 |
| HMT Pointer | Jan 1940 | Minesweeper, returned Dec 1945 |
| HMT Pointz Castle | Aug 1939 | Minesweeper, returned Apr 1945 |
| HMT Pol V | 1940 | Minesweeper, sold Nov 1945 |
| HMT Pol VII | 1940 | Minesweeper, United States Navy, returned 1946 |
| HMT Pol X | 1940 | Minesweeper, returned 1946 |
| HMT Polar 5 | Mar 1940 | Minesweeper, sold Sep 1946 |
| HMT Polar 6 | Mar 1940 | Minesweeper, sold Apr 1946 |
| HMT Polly Johnson | Aug 1939 | Minesweeper, bombed off Dunkirk 29 May 1940 |
| HMT Portia | May 1940 | Minesweeper, returned Jan 1946 |
| HMT Poseidon | Oct 1939 | Exam, returned 1945 |
| HMT Post Boy | 1940 | Minesweeper, returned Jul 1946 |
| HMT Pourquois Pas | 1940 | Auxiliary patrol, returned 1945 |
| HMT Powis Castle | Feb 1940 | Minesweeper, returned Apr 1945 |
| HMT Pre-Eminent | Oct 1939 | Harbour service, returned 1946 |
| HMT Present Help | 1941 | submarine tender, returned 1945 |
| HMT President Briand | 1940 | Minesweeper, MoWT 1943 |
| HMT President Herriot | 1940 | Auxiliary patrol, returned 1944 |
| HMT Preston North End | Sep 1939 | Anti-submarine, returned 1945 |
| HMT Pretoria | Jan 1942 | Anti-submarine, returned Nov 1945 |
| HMT Pride O'Moray | 1941 | Harbour service, returned 1945 |
| HMT Prime | Oct 1939 | Harbour service, returned 1945 |
| HMT Primevere | Dec 1939 | Harbour service, returned 1946 |
| HMT Primordial | 1941 | Harbour service, returned 1945 |
| HMT Prince De Liege | Sep 1940 | Boom defence vessel, returned 1945 |
| HMT Prince Leo | Jun 1940 | Minesweeper, balloon barrage vessel, returned 1945 |
| HMT Princess Mary | 1940 | Minesweeper, returned 1945 |
| HMT Principal | 1940 | Auxiliary patrol, returned 1945 |
| HMT Progress | 1940 | Harbour service, returned 1945 |
| HMT Promotive | Oct 1939 | Auxiliary patrol, mined in Loch Ewe 23 Dec 1939 |
| HMT Prospects Ahead | Dec 1939 | Minesweeper, returned Jan 1946 |
| HMT Protea | Jun 1941 | Minesweeper, returned Dec 1946 |
| HMT Pyrope | Aug 1939 | Minesweeper, bombed, Thames Estuary 12 Aug 1940 |

== Q ==
| Ship designation | Requisitioned | Fate |
|---|---|---|
| HMT Quercia | Aug 1942 | Esso, auxiliary patrol, returned Dec 1945 |
| HMT Quest | Nov 1940 | Harbour service, returned Oct 1945 |
| HMT Quiet Waters | Sep 1939 | Mine-watching, target service, returned Feb 1946 |
| HMT Quintia | May 1940 | Mobile wiping unit, returned Jul 1946 |

== R ==
| Ship designation | Requisitioned | Fate |
|---|---|---|
| HMT Rachel Flett | Dec 1939 | Harbour service, returned Jan 1946 |
| HMT Radnor Castle | Aug 1939 | Minesweeper, scrapped May 1947 |
| HMT Raetia | Aug 1939 | Auxiliary patrol, Esso, returned Feb 1946 |
| HMT Raglan Castle | Aug 1939 | Minesweeper, auxiliary patrol, sold Sep 1947 |
| HMT Rahman | 1940 | Minesweeper, lost by unknown cause at Batavia 1 Mar 1942 |
| HMT Rainstorm | Oct 1941 | Minesweeper, returned Nov 1945 |
| HMT Ralco | Oct 1939 | Auxiliary patrol, returned Jan 1940 |
| HMT Randfontein | Sep 1941 | Minesweeper, returned Apr 1946 |
| HMT Ratapiko | Jul 1940 | Minesweeper, returned Dec 1945 |
| HMT Raymond | Aug 1940 | Balloon barrage vessel, target service, returned Nov 1945 |
| HMT Raymont | Nov 1939 | Minesweeper, returned Mar 1946 |
| HMT Ray Of Hope | 1939 | Minesweeper, mined, Thames Estuary 10 Dec 1939 |
| HMT Rayon D'Or | 1940 | Minesweeper, returned 1945 |
| HMT Reboundo | Sep 1940 | Minesweeper, returned Dec 1945 |
| HMT Receptive | Apr 1940 | Minesweeper, mined, Thames Estuary 3 Jul 1941 |
| HMT Recoil | May 1940 | Anti-submarine, mined in the Channel 28 Sep 1940 |
| HMT Recono | Nov 1939 | Minesweeper, returned Jul 1945 |
| HMT Recordo | Oct 1939 | Auxiliary patrol, returned Jan 1940 |
| HMT Red Gauntlet | Aug 1939 | Minesweeper, torpedoed by E-boat, North Sea 5 Aug 1943 |
| HMT Red Sky | Nov 1939 | Minesweeper, exam, returned Mar 1946 |
| HMT Reed | Nov 1939 | Auxiliary patrol, Minesweeper, mined, Thames Estuary 7 Nov 1940 |
| HMT Reflect | Feb 1941 | Exam, returned Mar 1945 |
| HMT Reformo | 1941 | Harbour service, returned 1946 |
| HMT Refraction | Nov 1939 | Minesweeper, returned Mar 1945 |
| HMT Refundo | Nov 1939 | Minesweeper, mined off Harwich 18 Dec 1940 |
| HMT Regal | Sep 1939 | Anti-submarine, sold 1945 |
| HMT Regardo | Nov 1939 | Minesweeper, Esso, returned 1945 |
| HMT Rehearo | Sep 1940 | Minesweeper, returned Dec 1945 |
| HMT Reids | Dec 1939 | Den layer, Auxiliary patrol, returned Dec 1945 |
| HMT Reighton Wyke | Aug 1939 | Anti-submarine, returned Dec 1945 |
| HMT Reine Des Flots | Oct 1940 | Anti-submarine, returned 1946 |
| HMT Relonzo | Nov 1939 | Minesweeper, mined in the Mersey 20 Jan 1941 |
| HMT Remexo | Sep 1939 | Minesweeper, returned Dec 1945 |
| HMT Remillo | Apr 1940 | Dan layer, auxiliary patrol, mined in the Humber 27 Feb 1941 |
| HMT Renaissance | 1940 | Auxiliary patrol, returned 1945 |
| HMT Renascent | Nov 1939 | Minesweeper, returned Jan 1946 |
| HMT Rene | Jan 1940 | Harbour service, returned May 1946 |
| HMT Renzo | Nov 1939 | Minesweeper, returned Oct 1945 |
| HMT Reporto | Oct 1939 | Auxiliary patrol, returned Oct 1945 |
| HMT Resistance | Aug 1940 | Auxiliary patrol, returned 1945 |
| HMT Resmilo | Sep 1940 | Minesweeper, bombed at Peterhead 20 Jun 1941 |
| HMT Resolvo | Nov 1939 | Minesweeper, mined, Thames Estuary 12 Oct 1940 |
| HMT Resound | Aug 1940 | Minesweeper, returned Jan 1946 |
| HMT Resparko | Nov 1939 | Minesweeper, bombed at Falmouth 20 Aug 1940 |
| HMT Restart | Oct 1940 | Auxiliary patrol, returned May 1946 |
| HMT Restore | May 1940 | Balloon barrage vessel, returned 1945 |
| HMT Restrivo | Nov 1939 | Minesweeper, returned Jan 1945 |
| HMT Resurge | Sep 1940 | Harbour service, returned Jul 1946 |
| HMT Retako | Nov 1939 | Minesweeper, returned 1945 |
| HMT Retriever | Jan 1941 | Anti-submarine, returned Jul 1946 |
| HMT Returno | Nov 1939 | Minesweeper, Esso, returned 1945 |
| HMT Revello | Nov 1939 | Minesweeper, returned 1944 |
| HMT Reverberation | Nov 1939 | Auxiliary patrol, returned Feb 1945 |
| HMT Riano | Apr 1944 | Auxiliary patrol, returned Oct 1944 |
| HMT Riant | Nov 1939 | Auxiliary patrol, foundered off west coast of Scotland 25 Jan 1940 |
| HMT Richard Bennett | Sep 1939 | Minesweeper, returned May 1940 |
| HMT Richard Crofts | Aug 1939 | Minesweeper, returned Aug 1945 |
| HMT Rifsnes | Aug 1939 | Minesweeper, bombed off Ostend 20 May 1940 |
| HMT Rig | Dec 1939 | Minesweeper, auxiliary patrol, returned Nov 1945 |
| HMT Righto | Sep 1939 | Minesweeper, dan layer, returned Nov 1944 |
| HMT Rigoletto | Apr 1940 | Balloon barrage vessel, Esso, returned Jul 1945 |
| HMT Rime | Dec 1939 | Minesweeper, returned Nov 1945 |
| HMT Rinovia | Aug 1939 | Minesweeper, mined off Falmouth 2 Nov 1940 |
| HMT Rising Sea | 1941 | Harbour service, returned 1945 |
| HMT Riskato | Jun 1940 | Auxiliary patrol, returned May 1946 |
| HMT Risor | Jul 1940 | Anti-submarine, air/sea rescue, returned 1945 |
| HMT Ristango | Jun 1940 | Boom gate vessel, lost in collision with boom at Sheerness 14 Nov 1940 |
| HMT River Annan | Nov 1939 | Boom gate vessel, returned Nov 1945 |
| HMT River Clyde | Aug 1939 | Minesweeper, mined off Aldeburgh 5 Aug 1940 |
| HMT River Esk | Jun 1940 | Auxiliary patrol, returned Jul 1945 |
| HMT River Garry | Aug 1939 | Exam, returned Jul 1945 |
| HMT River Leven | Aug 1939 | Exam, Esso, returned Mar 1945 |
| HMT River Lossie | Jun 1940 | Auxiliary patrol, returned Feb 1945 |
| HMT River Ness | Nov 1939 | Auxiliary patrol, returned Feb 1940 |
| HMT River Spey | Apr 1940 | Dan layer, Auxiliary patrol, Minesweeper, returned Nov 1944 |
| HMT Riviere | Apr 1940 | Balloon barrage vessel, returned Nov 1944 |
| HMT Robert Bowen | Aug 1939 | Minesweeper, bombed off Aberdeen 9 Feb 1940 |
| HMT Robert Hastie | Nov 1939 | Dan layer, Auxiliary patrol, air/sea rescue, returned Jan 1946 |
| HMT Robert Stroud | Jun 1940 | Minesweeper, returned Apr 1946 |
| HMT Robinson | Jul 1940 | Minesweeper, returned Apr 1946 |
| HMT Rockall | Feb 1940 | Minesweeper, returned Jul 1944 |
| HMT Roche Bonne | Jul 1940 | Minesweeper, bombed off the Lizard 7 Apr 1941 |
| HMT Roche Velen | Nov 1939 | Minesweeper, returned Dec 1945 |
| HMT Rodino | 1940 | Minesweeper, bombed off Dover 27 Jul 1940 |
| HMT Roger Blonde | Oct 1940 | Boom defence vessel, returned Oct 1945 |
| HMT Roger Robert | Jul 1940 | Auxiliary patrol, returned Sep 1945 |
| HMT Rolls-Royce | Dec 1939 | Minesweeper, returned Jan 1946 |
| HMT Romany Rose | Jun 1940 | Auxiliary patrol, harbour service, Sep 1945 |
| HMT Rondeveli | Nov 1939 | Minesweeper, returned May 1946 |
| HMT Ronso | Jan 1942 | Minesweeper, Esso, returned Mar 1946 |
| HMT Roodepoort | Apr 1940 | Minesweeper, returned Feb 1946 |
| HMT Rosa | Oct 1940 | Minesweeper, lost by unknown cause in the Clyde 11 Sep 1943 |
| HMT Rosa Arthur | Sep 1939 | Auxiliary patrol, exam, returned Sep 1945 |
| HMT Roseacre | Jan 1940 | Harbour service, returned Apr 1945 |
| HMT Rosebay | Jan 1940 | Harbour service, Pyramus 1943, returned Sep 1945 |
| HMT Rosebud | Jan 1940 | Minesweeper, returned 1945 |
| HMT Roseden | Jan 1940 | Auxiliary patrol, returned 1945 |
| HMT Rose Emma | Dec 1939 | Minesweeper, balloon barrage vessel, returned May 1945 |
| HMT Rose Haugh | Nov 1939 | Mobile wiping unit, returned Apr 1946 |
| HMT Rose Hilda | Aug 1939 | Minesweeper, returned Apr 1946 |
| HMT Rosemonde | Jul 1940 | Minesweeper, sunk by U-203 off Cape Race 22 Jan 1942 |
| HMT Rosette | Jul 1940 | Minesweeper, returned Nov 1945 |
| HMT Rose Of England | Nov 1939 | Minesweeper, returned 1945 |
| HMT Rose Valley | Oct 1939 | Contraband control, lost in collision off Scapa 16 Dec 1943 |
| HMT Ross Ard | Nov 1939 | Minesweeper, returned Oct 1944 |
| HMT Rotherslade | Jun 1940 | Minesweeper, returned May 1946 |
| HMT Rotterdam | 1941 | Minesweeper, returned May 1946 |
| HMT Roule | 1940 | Boom defence vessel, returned 1945 |
| HMT Rowan Tree | Jan 1940 | Minesweeper, wrecked off Lowestoft 21 Nov 1941 |
| HMT Roxano | Nov 1939 | Balloon barrage vessel, Esso, returned May 1945 |
| HMT Royallieu | Nov 1939 | Minesweeper, lost 1 Sep 1940 |
| HMT Royalo | Nov 1939 | Minesweeper, returned Nov 1944 |
| HMT Roydur | Sep 1939 | Anti-submarine, lost 13 Feb 1941 |
| HMT Rubens | Aug 1940 | Assigned to anti-submarine warfare on convoy protection duty. Bombed and sunk in the Atlantic by a Fw 200 Condor of KG40, 13 Feb 1941 |
| HMT Rudilais | Sep 1939 | Auxiliary patrol, Minesweeper, Esso, returned May 1946 |
| HMT Rugby | May 1940 | Minesweeper, returned Jul 1946 |
| HMT Runswick Bay | Aug 1939 | Anti-submarine, lost 20 Apr 1940 |
| HMT Rutlandshire | Sep 1939 | Anti-submarine, bombed at Namsos & beached 31 May 1940 |

== S ==
| Ship designation | Requisitioned | Fate |
|---|---|---|
| HMT St. Achilleus | Aug 1939 | Anti-submarine, French La Cancalaise 1939 |
| HMT St. Amandus | Aug 1939 | Anti-submarine, French La Lorientalaise 1939, lost Jun 1944 |
| HMT St. Andronicus | Aug 1939 | Anti-submarine, lost 22 Nov 1941 |
| HMT St. Apollo | Feb 1940 | Anti-submarine, lost in collision off the Hebrides 22 Nov 1941 |
| HMT St. Arcadius | Aug 1939 | Anti-submarine, ?French La Nantaise 1939, lost 8 Jul 1945 |
| HMT St. Attalus | Aug 1939 | Anti-submarine, French La Havraise 1939, lost 27 Nov 1942, salved & lost 9 Jun 1944 |
| HMT St. Cathan | Sep 1939 | Anti-submarine, United States Navy, lost in collision off South Carolina 11 Apr 1942 |
| HMT St. Celestin | Sep 1939 | Boom defence vessel, returned Nov 1945 |
| HMT St. Donats | Aug 1939 | Minesweeper, lost in collision off the Humber 1 Mar 1941 |
| HMT St. Eloi | 1941 | Boom gate vessel, returned 1946 |
| HMT St. Elstan | Sep 1939 | Anti-submarine, returned Dec 1945 |
| HMT St. Goran | Sep 1939 | Anti-submarine, bombed off Namsos 3 May 1940 |
| HMT St. John Berchmans | Aug 1940 | Auxiliary patrol, returned 1945 |
| HMT St. Kenan | Sep 1939 | Anti-submarine, returned Feb 1946 |
| HMT St. Leonard | Nov 1939 | Auxiliary patrol, returned Feb 1940 |
| HMT St. Loman | Sep 1939 | Anti-submarine, returned Jul 1946 |
| HMT St. Melante | Aug 1939 | Minesweeper, returned Aug 1945 |
| HMT St. Minver | Dec 1939 | Minesweeper, Esso, sold May 1946 |
| HMT St. Nectan | May 1940 | Auxiliary patrol, anti-submarine, returned Apr 1946 |
| HMT St. Olive | Mar 1940 | Minesweeper, returned Nov 1945 |
| HMT St. Wistan | May 1940 | Auxiliary patrol, Anti-submarine, returned May 1946 |
| HMT St. Zeno | Mar 1940 | Anti-submarine, United States Navy 1942, sold May 1946 |
| HMT Sabina | Jul 1940 | Auxiliary patrol Sep 1944 |
| HMT Sahra | Oct 1941 | Minesweeper, returned Jan 1946 |
| HMT Sailor King | 1940 | Mine recovery vessel, boom defence vessel, returned 1945 |
| HMT Saint Pierre II | Jul 1940 | lost, probably Plymouth area? 29 Jul 1940 |
| HMT Salpa | 1940 | Minesweeper, returned 1946 |
| HMT Salvini | Apr 1940 | Balloon barrage vessel, Esso, returned 1945 |
| HMT Sambhur | Nov 1940 | Auxiliary patrol, wrecked off Colombo 5 May 1942 |
| HMT Samuel Benbow | Sep 1940 | Minesweeper, returned 1946 |
| HMT Sandringham | Aug 1939 | ?Minesweeper, returned Jul 1946 |
| HMT Sandstorm | Nov 1941 | Minesweeper, returned Nov 1944 |
| HMT Sangarius | Apr 1940 | Auxiliary patrol, returned Apr 1946 |
| HMT Sanson | Nov 1939 | Minesweeper, Esso, returned Sep 1946 |
| HMT Sansonette | Nov 1939 | Auxiliary patrol, returned Jan 1940 |
| HMT Santa Maria | Aug 1940 | Balloon barrage vessel, returned Sep 1945 |
| HMT Santa | Oct 1941 | Minesweeper, mined off La Maddalena 23 Nov 1943 |
| HMT Saon | Aug 1939 | Anti-submarine, sold 1945 |
| HMT Sarah A. Purdy | Feb 1940 | Balloon barrage vessel, returned Nov 1944 |
| HMT Sarah Hide | Nov 1939 | Minesweeper, auxiliary patrol, returned Jan 1946 |
| HMT Sarba | Nov 1939 | Boom defence vessel, returned Jul 1946 |
| HMT Sargon | Aug 1939 | Minesweeper, returned Jul 1945 |
| HMT Sarka | Oct 1941 | Minesweeper, sold 1946 |
| HMT Sarna | Mar 1940 | Minesweeper, mined in the Suez Canal 25 Feb 1941 |
| HMT Saronta | Jun 1940 | Minesweeper, returned Dec 1945 |
| HMT Sarpedon | Jun 1940 | Auxiliary patrol, Minesweeper, return Jul 1945 |
| HMT Sasebo | Aug 1939 | Minesweeper, returned Feb 1946 |
| HMT Sata | Aug 1939 | Minesweeper, Dec 1945 |
| HMT Satsa | Oct 1941 | Minesweeper, returned Dec 1945 |
| HMT Saturn | Nov 1939 | Minesweeper, Esso, returned Dec 1945 |
| HMT Saturnus | 1940 | Balloon barrage vessel, wrecked off the Isle of Man 1 May 1941 |
| HMT Saurian | Jun 1940 | Minesweeper, Auxiliary patrol, returned Nov 1945 |
| HMT Sauveur Du Monde | Aug 1940 | Auxiliary patrol, returned 1945 |
| HMT Sawfly | Aug 1939 | Minesweeper, returned Oct 1945 |
| HMT Saxonia | Nov 1939 | Auxiliary patrol, returned Jan 1940 |
| HMT Scalby Wyke | Oct 1939 | Anti-submarine, returned Oct 1945 |
| HMT Scarlet Thread | Sep 1939 | Harbour service, returned Sep 1946 |
| HMT Scarron | Jun 1940 | Minesweeper, returned Dec 1945 |
| HMT Scomber | May 1940 | Boom defence vessel, sold Feb 1947 |
| HMT Scotch Thistle | Nov 1939 | Mine recovery vessel, wrecked, Thames Estuary 7 Oct 1940 |
| HMT Scottish | Oct 1939 | Anti-submarine, returned 1945 |
| HMT Scourge | Nov 1939 | Minesweeper, Skyrocket 1943, returned May 1946 |
| HMT Seafarer | Nov 1939 | Auxiliary patrol, returned 1945 |
| HMT Sea Gleaner | Jul 1940 | Block ship, returned Mar 1944 |
| HMT Sea Holly | Nov 1939 | Minesweeper, returned Jun 1946 |
| HMT Sea King | Aug 1939 | Minesweeper, mined off Grimsby 9 Oct 1940 |
| HMT Sealyham | Apr 1940 | Anti-submarine, returned Jun 1945 |
| HMT Sea Mist | Feb 1940 | Minesweeper, returned Dec 1945 |
| HMT Sea Monarch | Jan 1940 | Boom defence vessel, returned Jun 1946 |
| HMT Seddon | Jun 1940 | Auxiliary patrol, Minesweeper Fly 1943, returned Feb 1946 |
| HMT Sedock | Nov 1939 | Auxiliary patrol, returned Feb 1940 |
| HMT Sedgefly | Sep 1939 | Anti-submarine, mined off the Tyne 16 Dec 1919 |
| HMT Sedulous | May 1940 | Balloon barrage vessel, exam, returned Oct 1945 |
| HMT Seksern | Oct 1940 | Minesweeper, returned Apr 1946 |
| HMT Selma | Nov 1941 | Minesweeper, Anti-submarine, returned Mar 1946 |
| HMT Semnos | Nov 1939 | Dan layer, auxiliary patrol, returned Oct 1945 |
| HMT Senateur Duhamel | Jan 1941 | Anti-submarine, United States Navy, lost in collision off Wilmington 6 May 1942 |
| HMT Serapion | Nov 1939 | Auxiliary patrol, returned Jan 1940 |
| HMT Sethon | Jun 1940 | Minesweeper, returned Oct 1945 |
| HMT Setter | Jun 1940 | Anti-submarine, returned Oct 1945 |
| HMT Settsu | Jan 1940 | Boom defence vessel, returned 1946 |
| HMT Sevra | Mar 1940 | Minesweeper, mined off Falmouth 6 Nov 1940 |
| HMT Shamrock | Nov 1939 | De-gaussing vessel, returned Dec 1944 |
| HMT Shandwich | Jan 1940 | Dan layer, minesweeper, returned Nov 1945 |
| HMT Sheldon | May 1940 | Auxiliary patrol, Esso, returned Dec 1944 |
| HMT Sheperd Lad | Aug 1939 | Minesweeper, harbour service, returned Apr 1946 |
| HMT Shera | Mar 1940 | Minesweeper, Russian 1942, foundered in the Barents Sea 9 Mar 1942 |
| HMT Sheraton | Jun 1940 | Minesweeper, returned Sep 1944 |
| HMT Shielburn | Mar 1944 | Esso, returned Oct 1944 |
| HMT Shika | Mar 1940 | Minesweeper, Russian 1942 |
| HMT Shila | Feb 1940 | Dan layer, target service, returned Mar 1946 |
| HMT Shipmates | Nov 1939 | Flare drifter, bombed at Dover 14 Nov 1940 |
| HMT Shooting Star | Nov 1941 | Minesweeper, returned 1946 |
| HMT Shova | Mar 1940 | Dan layer, target service, sold Mar 1946 |
| HMT Shusa | Mar 1940 | Minesweeper, Russian 1942, lost on passage to North Russia 20 Nov 1942 |
| HMT Sicyon | Nov 1939 | Minesweeper, returned Jul 1946 |
| HMT Sidney Smith | 1940 | Minesweeper, Parktown 1942, lost 21 Jun 1942 |
| HMT Siesta | 1940 | Minesweeper, Esso, Adelph 1944, returned 1945 |
| HMT Sigfra | Dec 1941 | Anti-submarine, sold Mar 1946 |
| HMT Signa | Feb 1940 | Dan layer, returned Feb 1945 |
| HMT Signal | Sep 1939 | Minesweeper, returned 1944 |
| HMT Silanian | Jan 1940 | Boom defence vessel, returned Dec 1945 |
| HMT Silicia | Aug 1939 | Minesweeper, mined off the Humber 8 May 1941 |
| HMT Silja | Mar 1940 | Minesweeper, Russian 1942, returned Mar 1947 |
| HMT Silva | Feb 1940 | Minesweeper, traffic control, returned 1945 |
| HMT Silver Crest | Oct 1939 | Minesweeper, FAA safety vessel, returned Feb 1945 |
| HMT Silver Dawn | Oct 1939 | Minesweeper, returned Oct 1945 |
| HMT Silver Dyke | Nov 1939 | Auxiliary patrol, returned Jan 1940 |
| HMT Silver Prince | 1940 | Harbour service, Skirmisher 1944, returned 1945 |
| HMT Silver Seas | Nov 1939 | Minesweepers, returned Aug 1944 |
| HMT Silver Sky | Dec 1939 | Exam, returned Feb 1946 |
| HMT Silver Spray | Nov 1939 | Minesweeper, returned ? |
| HMT Simbra | Dec 1941 | Anti-submarine, sold Sep 1946 |
| HMT Simmerson | Jul 1940 | Auxiliary patrol, returned Jun 1946 |
| HMT Simpson | Jun 1940 | Minesweeper, returned Dec 1945 |
| HMT Sindonis | Sep 1939 | Anti-submarine, bombed at Tobruk 29 May 1941 |
| HMT Sioux | Aug 1940 | Boom gate vessel, Indian 1944, returned 1945 |
| HMT Sir E. P. Wills | Sep 1939 | Exam, returned Aug 1945 |
| HMT Sir John Lister | Sep 1939 | Minesweeper, returned Apr 1945 |
| HMT Sirius | Jun 1940 | Auxiliary patrol, laid up Dec 1941 |
| HMT Sirra | Mar 1940 | Minesweeper, returned Apr 1946 |
| HMT Sisapon | Sep 1939 | Minesweeper, mined off Harwich 12 Jun 1940 |
| HMT Skudd 3 | Nov 1940 | Minesweeper, bombed at Tobruk 27.8341 |
| HMT Skudd 4 | Nov 1940 | Minesweeper, Spate 1944, returned Mar 1945 |
| HMT Skudd 5 | Nov 1940 | Minesweeper, Surge 1944, returned Mar 1945 |
| HMT Skudd 6 | Jul 1940 | Minesweeper, Sleet 1944, returned 1945 |
| HMT Slebech | Dec 1939 | Esso, returned Jan 1946 |
| HMT Sluga | Mar 1940 | Minesweeper, returned Apr 1946 |
| HMT Smalvlei | Jun 1940 | Anti-submarine, returned May 1946 |
| HMT Snakefly | Sep 1939 | Mine layer, returned Oct 1945 |
| HMT Snap | 1940 | Dan layer, returned 1945 |
| HMT Sobkra | 1941 | Anti-submarine, returned Sep 1946 |
| HMT Soetvlei | Jul 1940 | Mine weeper, returned Jun 1946 |
| HMT Soika | Apr 1940 | Minesweeper, returned Oct 1945 |
| HMT Soizic | Jul 1940 | Auxiliary patrol, lost 20 Mar 1941 |
| HMT Sojourner | Jan 1940 | Auxiliary patrol, returned 1945 |
| HMT Solomon | Aug 1939 | Minesweeper, mined north of Cromer 1 Apr 1942 |
| HMT Solon | Nov 1939 | Minesweeper, returned Jan 1946 |
| HMT Solstice | Dec 1939 | Minesweeper, submarine tender, returned Sep 1946 |
| HMT Solvra | 1941 | Anti-submarine, returned Sep 1946 |
| HMT Sondra | Dec 1941 | Anti-submarine, returned Oct 1945 |
| HMT Sonnwblom | 1941 | Minesweeper, returned Nov 1946 |
| HMT Sonny Boy | Jun 1940 | Harbour service, returned Aug 1945 |
| HMT Sophie Francois | Oct 1940 | Auxiliary patrol, returned Oct 1945 |
| HMT Soranus | Oct 1940 | Minesweeper, returned Oct 1945 |
| HMT Sorsra | Dec 1941 | Anti-submarine, returned Sep 1946 |
| HMT Sotra | Sep 1939 | Minesweeper, returned Sep 1946 |
| HMT Soubrette | Aug 1940 | Minesweeper, lost 29 Jan 1942 |
| HMT Southcoates | Jun 1940 | Minesweeper, returned Apr 1945 |
| HMT South Sea | 1940 | Auxiliary patrol, returned Nov 1945 |
| HMT Southern Barrier | Oct 1940 | Minesweeper, lost 19 Dec 1942 |
| HMT Southern Breeze | Mar 1940 | Minesweeper, returned May 1946 |
| HMT Southern Chief | Mar 1940 | Anti-submarine, returned Jan 1946 |
| HMT Southern Field | Mar 1940 | Anti-submarine, sold Feb 1946 |
| HMSAS Southern Floe | Mar 1940 | Minesweeper, returned Apr 1946 |
| HMT Southern Flower | Mar 1940 | Anti-submarine, sunk by U-1022 off Iceland 11 Feb 1941 |
| HMT Southern Foam | Mar 1940 | Anti-submarine, lost 3 Mar 1945 |
| HMT Southern Gem | Mar 1940 | Minesweeper, returned Jan 1946 |
| HMSAS Southern Isles | Mar 1940 | Anti-submarine, returned Apr 1945 |
| HMSAS Southern Maid | Mar 1940 | Anti-submarine, returned May 1946 |
| HMT Southern Pride | Mar 1940 | Anti-submarine, returned May 1946 |
| HMT Southern Sea | Mar 1940 | Anti-submarine, lost in collision with SS Wahine in New Zealand waters 16 Jun 1944 |
| HMT Southern Shore | Mar 1940 | Anti-submarine, returned May 1946 |
| HMT Southern Spray | Mar 1940 | Anti-submarine, returned Jan 1946 |
| HMT Southern Star | Mar 1940 | Anti-submarine, returned Nov 1945 |
| HMT Southern Wave | Mar 1940 | Anti-submarine, returned Jan 1946 |
| HMT Southward Ho | 1944 | Anti-submarine, returned Dec 1945 |
| HMT Spaniard | Sep 1939 | Esso, returned 1945 |
| HMT Spaniel | Apr 1940 | Anti-submarine, lost 5 Dec 1942 |
| HMT Sparholt | 1940 | Anti-submarine, returned Apr 1945 |
| HMT Spectrum | Sep 1939 | Mooring vessel, lost 13 Mar 1942 |
| HMT Speranza | Dec 1939 | Harbour service, returned Aug 1945 |
| HMT Spesaurea | 1940 | Auxiliary patrol, returned Aug 1946 |
| HMT Spesmelior | Oct 1939 | Harbour service, returned 1945 |
| HMT Sphene | Aug 1939 | Harbour service, returned Apr 1946 |
| HMT Spider | 1941 | Anti-submarine, returned 1945 |
| HMT Spina | Feb 1940 | Mobile wiping unit, sold 1946 |
| HMT Sposa | Apr 1940 | Dan layer, returned Mar 1945 |
| HMT Spindrift | Apr 1940 | Anti-submarine, returned Apr 1945 |
| HMT Sprig O'Heather | Apr 1940 | Anti-submarine, motor launch, San 1946, Skilpad 1951 |
| HMT Springs | Nov 1940 | Balloon barrage vessel, harbour service 1942, returned Feb 1946 |
| HMT Spurs | Sep 1939 | Minesweeper, returned May 1946 |
| HMT Squall | Nov 1941 | Anti-submarine, sold 1945 |
| HMT Stafnes | Sep 1939 | Dan layer, returned 1946 |
| HMT Stalberg | Dec 1939 | Anti-submarine, sold 1945 |
| HMT Standerton | Oct 1940 | Boom defence vessel, returned 1945 |
| HMT Stanislas Poumet | Jul 1940 | Anti-submarine, returned Feb 1946 |
| HMT Star XVI | Oct 1941 | DGV, returned 1945 |
| HMT Starlight Rays | Nov 1939 | Minesweeper, returned Nov 1945 |
| HMT Star of Britain | Jun 1940 | Minesweeper, exam, submarine tender, returned 1946 |
| HMT Star of Deveron | Nov 1939 | Minesweeper, Esso, returned Nov 1945 |
| HMT Star of Freedom | Dec 1939 | Minesweeper, lost 30 Sep 1941 |
| HMT Star of Hope | 1939 | Auxiliary patrol, returned 1945 |
| HMT Star Of Liberty | Sep 1940 | Exam, returned Jan 1946 |
| HMT Star Of Light | Oct 1940 | Examination service, returned 1946 |
| HMT Star of Orkney | Aug 1939 | Minesweeper, returned Sep 1946 |
| HMT Star of Pentland | Jan 1940 | Minesweeper, returned May 1946 |
| HMT Star of the Realm | Jan 1940 | Boom defence vessel, sold May 1946 |
| HMT Star of the Wave | Feb 1940 | Minesweeper, returned May 1946 |
| HMT Staunch | Nov 1939 | Minesweeper, Esso, returned Nov 1944 |
| HMT Staunton | May 1940 | Auxiliary patrol, mined, Thames Estuary 28 Jul 1940 |
| HMT Steenberg | Nov 1940 | Minesweeper, returned May 1946 |
| HMT Stefa | Mar 1940 | Minesweeper, Russian 1942–46, returned May 1947 |
| HMT Stella Canopus | Oct 1939 | Anti-submarine, returned Nov 1945 |
| HMT Stella Capella | Sep 1939 | Anti-submarine, sunk by U-701 off Iceland 11 Mar 1942 |
| HMT Stella Carina | May 1940 | Anti-submarine, returned May 1945 |
| HMT Stella Dorado | Sep 1939 | Anti-submarine, torpedoed by E-boat off Dunkirk 1 Jun 1940 |
| HMT Stella Leonis | Sep 1940 | Minesweeper, Dan layer, returned May 1945 |
| HMT Stella Orion | Sep 1939 | Minesweeper, mined, Thames Estuary 11 Nov 1940 |
| HMT Stella Pegasi | Sep 1939 | Anti-submarine, returned Apr 1945 |
| HMT Stella Polaris | May 1940 | Auxiliary patrol, anti-submarine, United States Navy, returned Oct 1945 |
| HMT Stella Rigel | Sep 1939 | Minesweepers, Dan layer, returned Jul 1945 |
| HMT Stella Sirius | Sep 1939 | Anti-submarine, bombed by French aircraft at Gibraltar 25 Sep 1940 |
| HMT Stellenberg | Nov 1940 | Minesweeper, returned May 1946 |
| HMT Stephens | Nov 1939 | Harbour service, returned Apr 1946 |
| HMT Sternus | Oct 1939 | Minesweeper, returned Apr 1945 |
| HMT Stina | Mar 1940 | Minesweeper, returned Feb 1946 |
| HMT Stoke City | Sep 1939 | Anti-submarine, returned 1945 |
| HMT Stone Fly | Aug 1939 | Minesweeper, returned Sep 1945 |
| HMT Stora | Jun 1940 | Anti-submarine, returned Mar 1947 |
| HMT Stormcentre | 1940 | Minesweepers, sold Aug 1946 |
| HMT Stormwrack | Apr 1942 | Minesweeper, returned Nov 1945 |
| HMT Strathalladale | 1944 | Esso, returned Oct 1944 |
| HMT Strathavon | Dec 1941 | Balloon barrage vessel, returned Nov 1945 |
| HMT Strathbeg | Dec 1939 | Harbour service, returned Apr 1946 |
| HMT Strathborve | Aug 1940 | Minesweeper, mined off the Humber 6 Sep 1941 |
| HMT Strathderry | Feb 1940 | Minesweeper, Auxiliary patrol, returned Jan 1946 |
| HMT Strathdevon | Jan 1940 | Minesweeper, auxiliary patrol, returned Jan 1946 |
| HMT Strathella | Jul 1940 | Auxiliary patrol, returned 1945 |
| HMT Strathelliot | Jan 1940 | Auxiliary patrol, returned Jan 1946 |
| HMT Strathfinella | Apr 1944 | Esso, returned Oct 1944 |
| HMT Strathgarry | Apr 1940 | Dan layer, Auxiliary patrol, returned Dec 1945 |
| HMT Strathmaree | Nov 1939 | Dan layer, auxiliary patrol, returned Nov 1945 |
| HMT Strathmartin | 1944 | Esso, returned 1945 |
| HMT Strathrannoch | Apr 1940 | Minesweeper, Auxiliary patrol, mooring vessel, returned Jul 1945 |
| HMT Strathspey | Nov 1939 | Boom defence vessel, returned Jan 1946 |
| HMT Strathugie | Jan 1940 | Minesweeper, returned Sep 1945 |
| HMT Strenuous | 1940 | Minesweeper, harbour service, returned Jan 1946 |
| HMT Strephon | Aug 1940 | Minesweeper, returned Feb 1946 |
| HMT Strijdt Voor Christus | Jun 1940 | Auxiliary patrol, to MoWT Apr 1942 |
| HMT Strive | Nov 1939 | Minesweeper, returned Dec 1945 |
| HMT Sturdee | Nov 1939 | Auxiliary patrol, returned Jan 1940 |
| HMT Sturton | Aug 1939 | Minesweepers, returned Oct 1944 |
| HMT Sublime | Jul 1940 | Examination service, returned Nov 1945 |
| HMT Suderroy I | 1941 | Minesweepers, Parktown 1942, returned Apr 1946 |
| HMT Suderoy IV | Aug 1940 | Minesweeper, returned Nov 1945 |
| HMT Suderoy V | Aug 1940 | Minesweeper, returned Nov 1945 |
| HMT Suderoy VI | Aug 1940 | Minesweeper, returned Nov 1945 |
| HMT Sukha | Mar 1940 | Minesweeper, returned Nov 1945 |
| HMT Sulla | 1940 | Minesweeper, Russian 1942, lost by unknown cause, Barents Sea Mar 1942 |
| HMT Suma | Aug 1939 | Minesweeper, returned Mar 1946 |
| HMT Sumba | 1940 | Minesweeper, Russian 1942–46, returned Mar 1947 |
| HMT Summer Rose | 1940 | Auxiliary patrol, mined off Sunderland 13 Oct 1940 |
| HMT Sunbeam II | Nov 1939 | Torpedo recovery vessel, returned Nov 1945 |
| HMT Sunburst | 1940 | Minesweeper, sold 1946 |
| HMT Sunlight | Nov 1939 | Minesweeper, wreck dispersal vessel, returned Feb 1946 |
| HMT Sunny Bird | Oct 1939 | Torpedo recovery vessel, returned Jan 1946 |
| HMT Sunnyside Girl | Dec 1939 | Anti-submarine, returned Feb 1946 |
| HMT Sunny Vale | Sep 1939 | Attached FAA, returned Jan 1946 |
| HMT Sunrise | Aug 1940 | Boom defence vessel, sold 1946 |
| HMT Sunspot | Jun 1940 | Minesweeper, returned 1945 |
| HMT Supporter | Dec 1939 | Harbour service, wrecked near Newhaven 5 Nov 1944 |
| HMT Sureaxe | Aug 1942 | Target service, returned Nov 1945 |
| HMT Susarion | Jun 1940 | Auxiliary patrol, bombed off the Humber 7 May 1941 |
| HMT Suzanne Adrienne | Jun 1940 | Auxiliary patrol, to Air Ministry Nov 1943 |
| HMT Suzette | Nov 1939 | Auxiliary patrol, returned Feb 1940 |
| HMT Sussex County | Nov 1939 | Auxiliary patrol, returned Apr 1945 |
| HMT Sustain | Mar 1940 | Harbour service, returned 1946 |
| HMT Sutherness | Jun 1940 | Auxiliary patrol, Minesweeper, returned Sep 1945 |
| HMT Svana | Apr 1940 | Minesweeper, bombed by Italian aircraft at Alexandria 8 Apr 1942 |
| HMT Svega | Mar 1940 | Minesweeper, Russian 1942 |
| HMT Sverre | May 1941 | KBV, returned 1945 |
| HMT Svolvaer | Jul 1940 | Anti-submarine, returned 1945 |
| HMT Swallow | Jul 1940 | Harbour service, returned 1945 |
| HMT Swan II | Apr 1940 | Minesweeper, Boiler cleaning ship, returned Apr 1945 |
| HMT Swansea Castle | Jul 1940 | Minesweeper, returned Feb 1946 |
| HMT Swartberg | Sep 1939 | Minesweeper, returned May 1946 |
| HMT Sweet Promise | Nov 1939 | Minesweeper, returned Nov 1945 |
| HMT Swift Wing | Nov 1939 | Minesweeper, returned Apr 1946 |
| HMT Swirl | 1942 | Auxiliary patrol, returned 1945 |
| HMT Swona | Apr 1940 | Minesweeper, returned Mar 1946 |
| HMT Sydoslandet | 1940 | Anti-submarine, wrecked at the mouth of the Umgeni River 6 Apr 1942 |
| HMT Syrian | Apr 1940 | Minesweeper, returned Jan 1946 |
| HMT Syvern | Jan 1941 | Anti-submarine, bombed between Crete & Alexandria 27 May 1941 |

== T ==
| Ship designation | Requisitioned | Fate |
|---|---|---|
| HMT Taipo | Nov 1939 | Minesweeper, Esso, returned Nov 1944 |
| HMT Takla | Sep 1939 | Minesweeper, returned 1945 |
| HMT Tamora | Aug 1939 | Minesweeper, returned Mar 1946 |
| HMT Tarana | Aug 1940 | Auxiliary patrol, returned 1945 |
| HMT Tartan | Nov 1939 | Dan layer, auxiliary patrol, Minesweeper, returned Jul 1945 |
| HMT Tartarin | Aug 1940 | Minesweeper, returned Mar 1945 |
| HMT Teal | Aug 1940 | Boom defence vessel, sold Mar 1946 |
| HMT Tea Rose | Jan 1940 | Anti-submarine, returned Dec 1945 |
| HMT Teazer | Nov 1939 | Auxiliary patrol, returned Feb 1940 |
| HMT Tehana | Aug 1939 | Minesweeper, wreck dispersal vessel, returned Mar 1946 |
| HMT Tekoura | Oct 1939 | Anti-submarine Aug 1945 |
| HMT Teniers | Aug 1940 | Balloon barrage vessel, returned Sep 1945 |
| HMT Teroma | Aug 1939 | Minesweeper, returned Mar 1945 |
| HMT Tervani | Jun 1940 | Auxiliary patrol, Minesweeper, sunk by Acciaio off Algeria 7 Feb 1943 |
| HMT Tessie | May 1940 | TRV, sold 1946 |
| HMT Tewara | Aug 1939 | Minesweeper, returned Jun 1946 |
| HMT Texas | 1940 | Minesweeper, Lost in collision off Jamaica 19 Jul 1944 |
| HMT Thains | Jul 1940 | Harbour service, returned Jun 1946 |
| HMT Thaw | Dec 1939 | Minesweeper, Auxiliary patrol, returned Feb 1946 |
| HMT The Boys | Nov 1939 | Flare drifter, auxiliary patrol, foundered in the Downs 14 Nov 1940 |
| HMT The Provost | 1940 | Anti-submarine, returned 1945 |
| HMT The Roman | Dec 1939 | Anti-submarine, Esso, returned Aug 1946 |
| HMT The Tower | Nov 1939 | Balloon barrage vessel, returned Feb 1945 |
| HMT The Way | Nov 1939 | Boom defence vessel, returned Jul 1945 |
| HMT Their Merit | Aug 1939 | Minesweeper, returned Nov 1945 |
| HMT Thermopylae | Dec 1939 | Minesweeper, auxiliary patrol, returned Apr 1946 |
| HMT Thistle | Apr 1940 | Exam, mined off Lowestoft 8 May 1941 |
| HMT Thomas Aloft | Aug 1939 | Minesweeper, returned Apr 1946 |
| HMT Thomas Bartlett | Nov 1939 | Minesweeper, mined off Calais 28 May 1940 |
| HMT Thomas Connolly | Nov 1939 | Boom defence vessel, mined off Sheerness 17 Dec 1940 |
| HMT Thomas Currell | Aug 1939 | Minesweeper, returned Nov 1945 |
| HMT Thomas Leeds | Aug 1939 | Minesweeper, returned Nov 1945 |
| HMT Thomsons | Nov 1939 | Minesweeper, harbour service, returned Feb 1946 |
| HMT Thora | Jun 1940 | Balloon barrage vessel, lost in collision with boom at Grimsby 26 Apr 1943 |
| HMT Thorbryn | May 1941 | Anti-submarine, bombed at Tobruk 19 Aug 1941 |
| HMT Thorgrim | May 1941 | Anti-submarine, bombed by Italian aircraft at Alexandria 8 Apr 1942 |
| HMT Thornwick Bay | Aug 1939 | Anti-submarine, sold Apr 1945 |
| HMT Thorodd | Apr 1940 | Minesweeper, returned Aug 1945 |
| HMT Thorvard | Apr 1940 | Minesweeper, returned 1946 |
| HMT Three Kings | Nov 1939 | Minesweeper, returned Sep 1944 |
| HMT Thrifty | Dec 1939 | Minesweeper, returned Apr 1946 |
| HMT Thrush | Nov 1939 | Harbour service, Ambition 1944, returned Apr 1946 |
| HMT Thunderstone | Apr 1940 | Balloon barrage vessel, returned Apr 1946 |
| HMT Thuringia | Aug 1939 | Anti-submarine, mined, North Sea 28 May 1940 |
| HMT Tilbury Ness | Sep 1939 | Minesweeper, bombed, Thames Estuary 1 Nov 1940 |
| HMT Tilly Duff | Nov 1939 | Minesweeper, returned Aug 1946 |
| HMT Tirade | May 1942 | Auxiliary patrol |
| HMT Tocsin | Nov 1939 | Minesweeper, Esso, returned Sep 1945 |
| HMT Token | 1940 | Minesweeper, wrecked in Skerry Sound 23 Dec 1941 |
| HMT Tokyo II | Oct 1939 | Minesweeper, Esso, returned 1946 |
| HMAS Tongkol | Sep 1939 | Minesweeper, returned 1945 |
| HMT Torbay II | 1940 | Auxiliary patrol, bombed off Dover 1 Jan 1940 |
| HMT Tordonn | 1941 | Anti-submarine, returned May 1946 |
| HMT Toreador | 1940 | Balloon barrage vessel, returned 1945 |
| HMT Tornado | Apr | Minesweeper, sold Apr 1946 |
| HMT Torteau | 1940 | Minesweeper, boom gate vessel, returned 1945 |
| HMT Touchstone | 1940 | Minesweeper, returned 1945 |
| HMT Tradewind | 1940 | Balloon barrage vessel, harbour service, returned 1945 |
| HMT Trang | 1940 | Minesweeper, abandoned at Singapore 14 Feb 1942 |
| HMT Tranio | Oct 1939 | Minesweeper, bombed, North Sea 26 Jun 1941 |
| HMT Tranquil | Feb 1940 | Minesweeper, lost in collision off Deal 16 Jun 1942 |
| HMT Transvaal | 1940 | Auxiliary patrol, Minesweeper, Esso, foundered in the Channel 18 Nov 1944 |
| HMT Transvaalia | 1941 | Minesweeper, Royal Hellenic Navy Evrotus 1943, returned 1946 |
| HMT Trebouliste | Oct 1940 | Special service, returned Apr 1945 |
| HMT Treern | 1941 | Minesweeper, mined in Greek waters 12 Jan 1945 |
| HMT T. R. Ferrens | Aug 1939 | Minesweeper, returned Apr 1945 |
| HMT Triple Alliance | Nov 1939 | Harbour service, returned Jul 1946 |
| HMT Tritrlia | Nov 1939 | Auxiliary patrol, returned Jul 1945 |
| HMT Tritonia | Nov 1939 | Minesweeper, returned Jan 1946 |
| HMT Triton | Dec 1939 | Auxiliary patrol, Esso, returned 1945 |
| HMT Triumph | May 1940 | Boom barrage vessel, submarine tender, returned 1945 |
| HMT Trojan | 1940 | Boom gate vessel, returned 1945 |
| HMT Tromoy | Nov 1940 | Minesweeper Cloudburst 1944, returned 1946 |
| HMT Trophy | Nov 1939 | Balloon barrage vessel, returned Jan 1946 |
| HMT Troup Ahead | Dec 1939 | Minesweeper, returned Jul 1946 |
| HMT True Accord | Dec 1939 | Auxiliary patrol, lost in collision off Gt. Yarmouth 26 Dec 1940 |
| HMT True Friend | Oct 1940 | Minesweeper, auxiliary patrol, returned Feb 1946 |
| HMT True Reward | 1940 | Mobile wiping unit, returned Feb 1946 |
| HMT True Vine | Jul 1940 | Boom defence vessel, returned Sep 1945 |
| HMT Trust | 1940 | Anti-submarine, returned 1945 |
| HMT Trustful | Dec 1939 | Harbour service, returned Jan 1946 |
| HMT Trusty Star | 1940 | Minesweeper, mined off Malta 10 Jun 1942 |
| HMT Tuirangi | 1942 | Minesweeper, returned 1946 |
| HMT Tumby | Nov 1939 | Dan layer, auxiliary patrol, Minesweeper, returned Apr 1945 |
| HMT Tunisian | Oct 1939 | Boom defence vessel, mined off Harwich 9 Jul 1942 |
| HMT Turcoman | Aug 1939 | Anti-submarine, sold 1945 |
| HMT Turffontein | 1941 | Anti-submarine, returned Mar 1945 |
| HMT Tweenways | Nov 1939 | Minesweeper, returned Mar 1945 |
| HMT Twinkling Star | Sep 1939 | Boom defence vessel, returned Oct 1945 |
| HMT Typhoon | Jun 1940 | Minesweeper, returned May 1945 |
| HMT Tyrie | Mar 1940 | Exam Pungent 1943, returned 1945 |

== U ==
| Ship designation | Requisitioned | Fate |
|---|---|---|
| HMT Uberty | Nov 1939 | Minesweepers, bombed off Lowestoft 8 May 1941 |
| HMT Uberous | Dec 1939 | Minesweeper, wrecked in Lough Foyle 11 Jan 1941 |
| HMT Ugiebank | Nov 1939 | Auxiliary patrol, Esso, returned 1945 |
| HMT Ugie Brae | 1940 | Mobile wiping unit, returned 1946 |
| HMT Ugie Vale | Nov 1939 | Harbour service, returned Oct 1944 |
| HMT Uiver | Jul 1940 | Minesweeper, boom defence vessel, returned Nov 1945 |
| HMT Ullstein | 1941 | KBV, returned 1945 |
| HMT Unicity | Dec 1939 | Minesweeper, scrapped Oct 1943 |
| HMT Unison | 1940 | Harbour service Harmony 1943, returned 1945 |
| HMT United | 1940 | Harbour service, returned 1945 |
| HMT United Boys | Nov 1939 | Minesweeper, returned Sep 1945 |
| HMT Utilise | Dec 1939 | Minesweeper, returned Mar 1946 |
| HMT Ut Prosim | Nov 1939 | Flare drifter, auxiliary patrol, sunk by gunfire in Dover harbour 2 Mar 1943 |
| HMT Utvaer | Aug 1940 | Minesweeper, returned 1945 |

== V ==
| Ship designation | Requisitioned | Fate |
|---|---|---|
| HMT Vaillant | Aug 1940 | Auxiliary patrol, boom gate vessel, returned 1945 |
| HMT Valdora | Nov 1939 | Minesweeper, bombed off Cromer 12 Jan 1940 |
| HMT Valesca | Nov 1939 | Minesweeper, wreck dispersal vessel, returned Dec 1945 |
| HMT Valmont | Nov 1939 | Minesweeper, Nov 1945 |
| HMT Van Dyck | Feb 1941 | Anti-submarine, returned Nov 1945 |
| HMT Van Oost | Jul 1940 | Anti-submarine, returned Nov 1945 |
| HMT Van Orley | Mar 1941 | Anti-submarine, bombed at Liverpool, salved & scrapped 4 May 1941 |
| HMT Varanga | Aug 1939 | Minesweeper, returned Nov 1945 |
| HMT Varanis | Dec 1939 | Minesweeper, returned Nov 1945 |
| HMT Vardo | Jul 1940 | Minesweeper, returned Dec 1945 |
| HMT Vascama | Sep 1939 | Anti-submarine, armed boarding vessel, Portuguese 1939–44, sold Apr 1945 |
| HMT Velia | May 1940 | mined off Harwich 19 Oct 1940 |
| HMT Venosta | Dec 1939 | Minesweeper, boom gate vessel, returned 1945 |
| HMT Ventose | Aug 1940 | Minesweeper, exam, returned Jul 1944 |
| HMT Vercheres | 1939 | Minesweeper, lost by fire at Sorel, Quebec 9 May 1943 |
| HMT Vereeniging | 1941 | Anti-submarine, returned Mar 1945 |
| HMT Vernal | Nov 1939 | Minesweeper, torpedo recovery vessel, scrapped Jan 1946 |
| HMT Vers Le Destin | Aug 1940 | Auxiliary patrol, returned 1945 |
| HMT Vestfjiord | 1940 | Auxiliary patrol, returned 1945 |
| HMT Victrix | Sep 1939 | Anti-submarine, returned Dec 1945 |
| HMT Vicereine | 1942 | Torpedo recovery vessel, returned 1945 |
| HMT Victorian | Aug 1939 | Anti-submarine, sold 1946 |
| HMT Vidonia | Jun 1940 | Auxiliary patrol, Esso, lost by unknown cause in the Channel 6 Oct 1944 |
| HMT Vierge De Lourdes | Jul 1940 | Minesweeper, returned Jan 1946 |
| HMT Viernoe | 1939 | Boom gate vessel, returned 1945 |
| HMT Vigiliant | Jun 1940 | Balloon barrage vessel, returned 1945 |
| HMT Vigilant | 1940 | Auxiliary patrol, mine-watching, returned 1945 |
| HMT Vigra | 1941 | Ferry service, returned 1945 |
| HMT Vikingbank | 1940 | Minesweeper, returned 1945 |
| HMT Viking Deeps | Jun 1940 | Auxiliary patrol, returned Nov 1944 |
| HMT Vikings | 1940 | Anti-submarine, sunk by U-542 on the coast of Syria 17 Apr 1942 |
| HMT Vilda | Jan 1940 | Boom defence vessel, returned Sep 1946 |
| HMT Village Belle | 1940 | Auxiliary patrol, harbour service, returned 1945 |
| HMT Vindelcia | Jun 1940 | Auxiliary patrol, Esso, returned Dec 1945 |
| HMT Vine | Jun 1940 | Balloon barrage vessel, returned 1945 |
| HMT Violet Flower | Nov 1939 | Minesweeper, returned 1945 |
| HMT Vireo | Dec 1939 | Minesweeper, returned Nov 1943 |
| HMT Visenda | Aug 1939 | Anti-submarine, returned Feb 1946 |
| HMT Viviana | Oct 1939 | Anti-submarine, returned May 1946 |
| HMT Vizalma | Jun 1940 | Anti-submarine, sold Dec 1945 |

== W ==
| Ship designation | Requisitioned | Fate |
|---|---|---|
| HMT Walkerdale | Jan 1940 | Harbour service, returned Sep 1945 |
| HMT Wallena | Nov 1939 | Minesweeper, returned Nov 1945 |
| HMT Walwyns Castle | Nov 1939 | Minesweeper, returned Mar 1946 |
| HMT Wardour | Feb 1940 | Minesweeper, returned Apr 1946 |
| HMT War Duke | Nov 1939 | Minesweeper, returned Dec 1944 |
| HMT War Star | 1940 | Anti-submarine, Esso, returned Feb 1946 |
| HMT War Wing | Nov 1939 | Minesweeper, returned Jan 1946 |
| HMT Warland | Apr 1940 | Auxiliary patrol, bombed, North Sea 18 Feb 1942 |
| HMT Warwick Deeping | Sep 1939 | Anti-submarine, sunk by gunfire in the Channel 12 Oct 1940 |
| HMT Warwickshire | Aug 1939 | Anti-submarine, bombed off Trondheim 30 Apr 1940 |
| HMT Washington | Nov 1939 | Minesweeper, mined, North Sea 6 Dec 1939 |
| HMT Watchword | 1942 | KBV, returned Jun 1946 |
| HMT Waterfly | Sep 1939 | Minesweeper, mined off Dunkirk 17 Sep 1942 |
| HMT Waveflower | Sep 1939 | Minesweeper, lost 21 Oct 1940 |
| HMT Weazel | Nov 1939 | Auxiliary patrol, lost Oct 1941 |
| HMT Welback | Jun 1940 | Minesweeper, returned Jan 1946 |
| HMT Welcome | 1940 | Balloon barrage vessel, returned 1944 |
| HMT Welcome Home | Nov 1939 | Minesweeper, returned 1945 |
| HMT Wellard | Aug 1939 | Anti-submarine, United States Navy, sold 1945 |
| HMT Wellsbach | Aug 1939 | Minesweeper, returned Sep 1945 |
| HMT Welwyn | 1940 | Torpedo recovery vessel, returned 1945 |
| HMT Westella | Sep 1939 | anti-submarine, mined off Dunkirk 2 Jun 1940 |
| HMT West Haven | Dec 1939 | Minesweeper, returned Sep 1945 |
| HMT West Holme | Sep 1939 | Harbour service, returned Dec 1946 |
| HMT Westlyn | 1940 | Boom defence vessel, sold May 1947 |
| HMT Western Explorer | Oct 1940 | Examination service, returned 1945 |
| HMT West Neuk | Apr 1940 | Boom barrage vessel, returned Feb 1943 |
| HMT Wheat Stalk | May 1940 | Harbour service, to MoWT 1942 |
| HMT Whippet | Jan 1941 | Anti-submarine, bombed in the Mediterranean 4 Oct 1941 |
| HMT Whitecap | 1941 | Auxiliary patrol |
| HMT White Daisy | Apr 1941 | Harbour service, lost in Scottish waters 25 Sep 1940 |
| HMT Whytock | Feb 1940 | Minesweeper, returned Jun 1946 |
| HMT Wigan | 1940 | Minesweeper, returned 1945 |
| HMT Willa | 1940 | Dan layer, returned 1945 |
| HMT William Bell | Jun 1940 | Minesweeper, returned Feb 1946 |
| HMT William Brady | Jun 1940 | Auxiliary patrol, returned Feb 1946 |
| HMT William Bunce | Sep 1939 | Minesweeper, returned Jan 1940 |
| HMT William Caldwell | Jan 1940 | Boom defence vessel, sold Dec 1946 |
| HMT William Cale | Aug 1939 | Minesweeper, returned Jul 1945 |
| HMT William Hallet | Nov 1939 | Minesweeper, mined off the Tyne 13 Dec 1939 |
| HMT William Hanbury | Nov 1939 | Auxiliary patrol, returned Jan 1940 |
| HMT William Hannam | Oct 1939 | Boom defence vessel, returned Apr 1946 |
| HMT William H. Hastie | Aug 1940 | Exam, salvage vessel, returned Jul 1945 |
| HMT William Mannel | Jun 1940 | Minesweeper, returned Nov 1945 |
| HMT William Purdy | Feb 1940 | Balloon barrage vessel, returned Oct 1945 |
| HMT William Scoresby | 1939 | Minesweeper, returned Jan 1947 |
| HMT William Stephens | Nov 1939 | Minesweeper, torpedoed by E-boat off Cromer 25 Oct 1943 |
| HMT William Stroud | Mar 1944 | Esso, returned Mar 1945 |
| HMT William Wesney | Sep 1939 | Minesweeper, mined off Orfordness 7 Nov 1940 |
| HMT William Wilson | 1940 | Hospital drifter, returned 1945 |
| HMT Willing Boys | Nov 1939 | Minesweeper, returned Aug 1946 |
| HMT Wilson Line | 1940 | Hospital drifter, returned 1945 |
| HMT Winchat | Jun 1940 | Harbour service, returned 1945 |
| HMT Windsor Lad | 1940 | Minesweeper, returned 1945 |
| HMT Windward | Aug 1939 | Minesweeper, returned |
| HMT Windward Ho | Oct 1939 | Minesweeper, returned 1945 |
| HMT Whitam | Nov 1939 | Minesweeper, Esso, returned Nov 1944 |
| HMT Winifred | Jul 1940 | Boom tender, returned 1945 |
| HMT Withernsea | Nov 1939 | Minesweeper, sold Mar 1946 |
| HMT Wolborough | Sep 1939 | Anti-submarine, sold Aug 1945 |
| HMT Wolves | Aug 1939 | Anti-submarine, returned Oct 1945 |
| HMT Woods | Nov 1939 | Auxiliary patrol, returned Jan 1940 |
| HMT Wrangler | Aug 1942 | Minesweeper, returned |
| HMT Wydale | Mar 1940 | Exam, returned Mar 1946 |
| HMT Wyoming | Jun 1940 | Minesweeper, mined off Harwich 20 May 1944 |
| HMT Wyre | Jun 1940 | Boom defence vessel, returned Aug 1945 |

== X ==
| Ship designation | Requisitioned | Fate |
|---|---|---|
| HMT Xmas Eve | Oct 1939 | Harbour service, returned 1945 |
| HMT Xmas Morn | Aug 1939 | Harbour service, returned 1945 |
| HMT Xmas Rose | Nov 1939 | Auxiliary patrol, mined, Thames Estuary 21 Nov 1940 |

== Y ==
| Ship designation | Requisitioned | Fate |
|---|---|---|
| HMT Yashima | Aug 1939 | Minesweeper, returned Apr 1946 |
| HMT Yellow Hammer | Apr 1941 | Anti-submarine target carrier, mobile workshop, returned Apr 1946 |
| HMT Yezo | Nov 1939 | Minesweeper, wreck dispersal vessel, returned Jun 1946 |
| HMT Ymuiden | 1940 | Minesweeper, returned Apr 1946 |
| HMT York City | Aug 1939 | Anti-submarine, sold Nov 1945 |
| HMT Yorkshire Lass | Nov 1939 | Minesweeper, RDF tender, returned May 1946 |
| HMT Young Alfred | Nov 1939 | Balloon barrage vessel, returned Sep 1946 |
| HMT Young Cliff | Nov 1939 | Mine recovery vessel, returned Jun 1946 |
| HMT Young Ernie | Dec 1939 | Auxiliary patrol, lost in collision off the Tyne 18 Apr 1941 |
| HMT Young Fisherman | Jun 1940 | Auxiliary patrol, wrecked at Oban 29 Nov 1940 |
| HMT Young Jacob | Nov 1939 | Minesweeper, returned Jan 1946 |
| HMT Young John | 1939 | Mobile wiping unit, returned Jan 1946 |
| HMT Young Mun | 1939 | Auxiliary patrol, Brontosaurus 1942, returned 1946 |
| HMT Young Sid | May 1940 | Auxiliary patrol, lost in collision in the Moray Firth 10 Aug 1940 |
| HMT Ythan Braes | Aug 1942 | Auxiliary patrol, water carrier, returned Feb 1946 |

== Z ==
| Ship designation | Requisitioned | Fate |
|---|---|---|
| HMT Zareba | Aug 1940 | Minesweeper, returned Nov 1944 |
| HMT Zeemeeuw | Jun 1940 | Auxiliary patrol, lost in collision off Gravesend, later salved 21 Sep 1943 |
