= Northern Steamship Company =

New Zealand local shipping and transport company

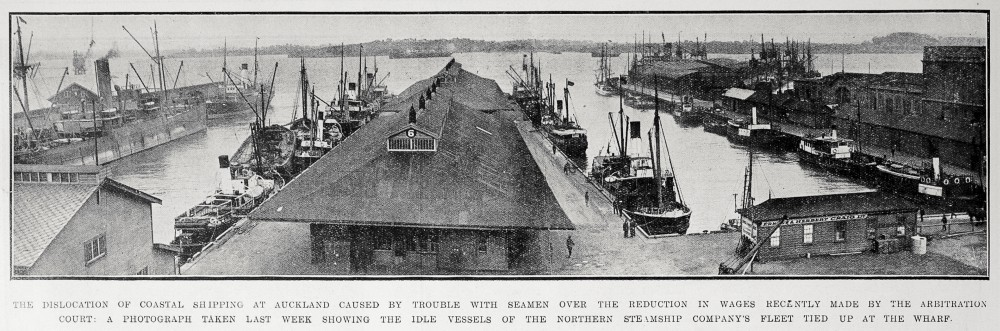
The east coast Northern Steamship fleet at Auckland in 1922, during a strike.

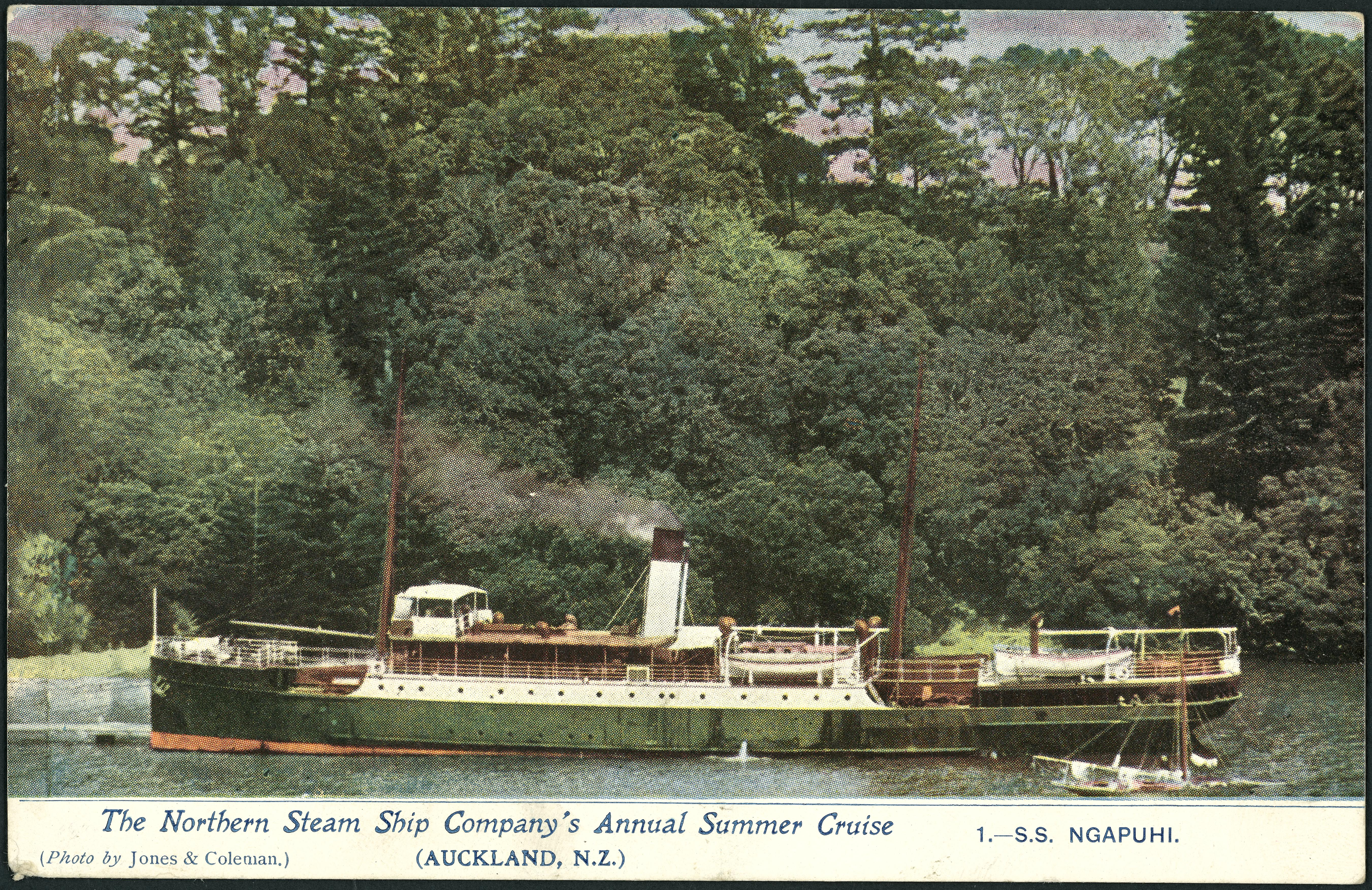
Ngapuhi on The Northern Steam Ship Company's annual summer cruise at Kawau, about 1907

The Northern Steam Ship Company Ltd (NSS) served the northern half of the North Island of New Zealand from 1881 to 1974. Its headquarters, the Northern Steam Ship Company Building, remains in use on Quay Street, Auckland as a bar and is listed by Heritage New Zealand as a Category I Historic Place.

== Origins ==
Initially there were very few roads and they were muddy and narrow, so a constant theme in early papers was a demand from small coastal settlements for a regular shipping service to link them with the major ports. For example, in 1874 a steamer service from Onehunga to Raglan and Port Waikato was offered a subsidy by Auckland Province and SS Southern Cross ran a service for a year. In 1878 arrangements were again made for a subsidy, this time with the Native Minister for SS Lalla Rookh to run to Raglan fortnightly. Shipping again became intermittent until NSS started a fortnightly service in 1883.

Capt. Alexander McGregor had the steam ship Rowena built in Auckland in 1872. He joined with a syndicate of owners to run the Argyle, Iona, Glenelg, Staffa, Rowena, Fingal and Katikati, as Auckland Steam Packet Co. ASP went into liquidation in 1878 due to losses on a ship for the Fiji trade, the SS Llewellyn. On 10 January 1878 ASP had sold Southern Cross for £7000, Go-Ahead for £2500, Pretty Jane for £2350 and the Cantera hulk and her coal for £384, to what was described as a newly formed Auckland company.

On 11 May 1881 nineteen businessmen, including some of the syndicate, formed NSS, buying the ASP's ships. Thomas Morrin, David Cruickshank, Alexander McGregor, Thomas Ball, James Macfarlane and James McCosh Clark were the first directors.

NSS paid a 10% dividend in its first year and started acquiring extra ships. The 256 ton Macgregor entered service in September 1881. In 1883 Capt. McGregor went to Britain to buy new steamers for the Tauranga and Russell routes. In 1884 Clansman and Gairloch arrived. In 1886 the Waimarie was one of the first to have electric lighting.

NSS was also active in opening up new ports, such as at Te Puke in 1881 and ports north of Whangārei in 1893.

== 1887–1921 ==
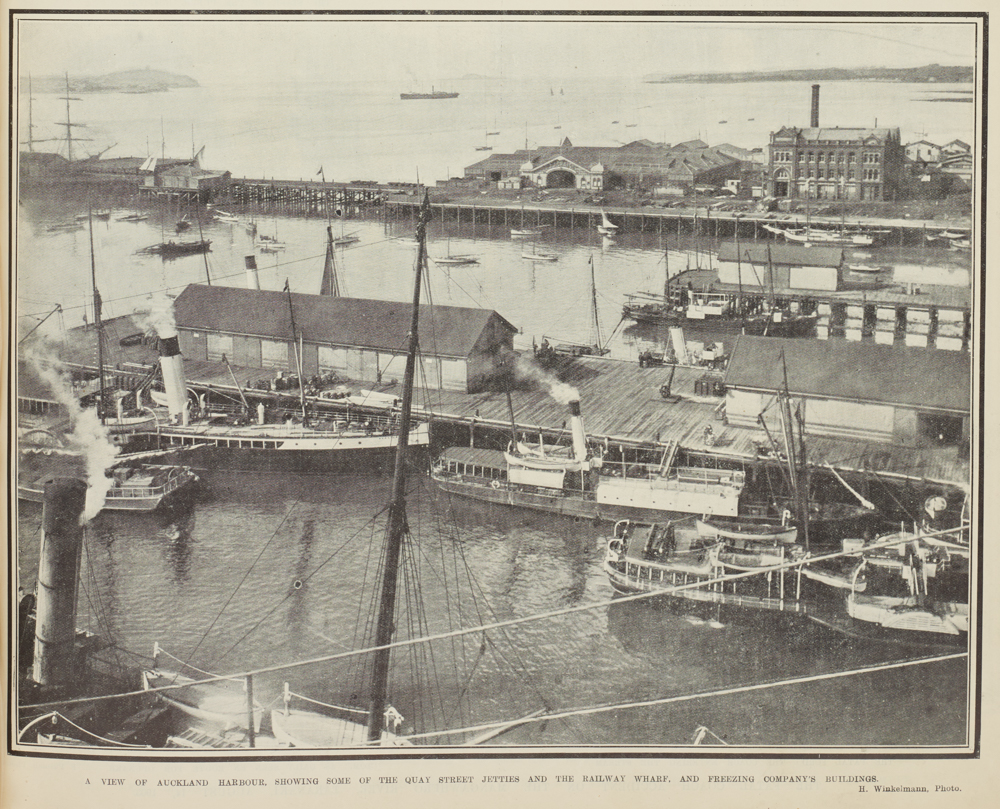
Auckland in 1903 Wakatere (left), Rotomahana (centre), Terranora (right)

On 6 June 1888 Capt. McGregor was replaced as manager by Charles Ranson. He retired in 1921, after greatly expanding the company.

=== 1887 industrial dispute ===
By 1887 the depression was affecting the company; wages and overtime pay were cut, and seamen who objected were replaced with non-unionists. In response the Federated Seamen's Union formed the co-operative Jubilee Steam Ship Co, competing on the northern and Waitara routes. It wasn't expected to succeed, but, between September 1887 and October 1888, the FSU claimed that Jubilee lost £14,000 and NSS £22,000. It also caused another company to withdraw from the west coast, which in the end was helpful to NSS. When Ranson took over, one of his first acts was to re-engage all the FSU members, though he also cut staff. He remained a lifelong friend of the union boss, John A. Millar, and received an award from staff in 1897 for his considerate attitude to them. However, in the 1913 Great Strike, NSS backed a ‘scab’ union (the Auckland Seamen and Firemen's Union).

=== Charles Ranson, manager ===
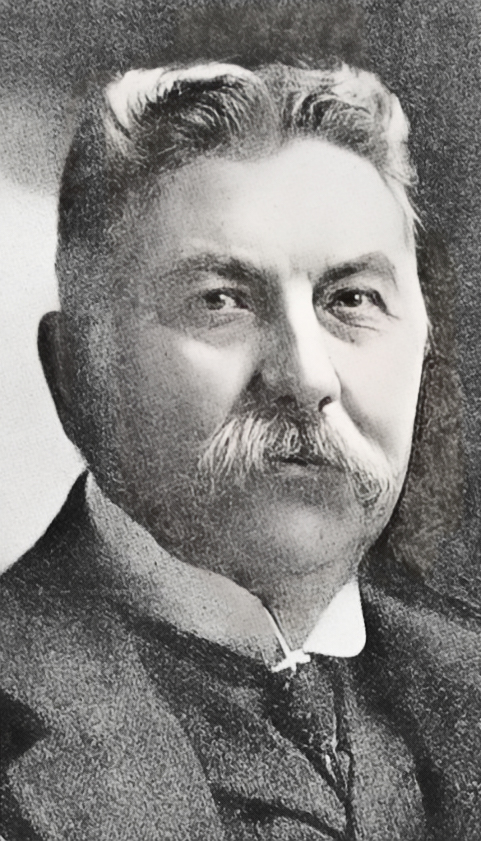
Auckland Weekly News obituary

Charles Ranson was born, in Ipswich about 1850. He emigrated in 1876, managed an auctioneering and shipping business in Hāwera, then went to Auckland as an accountant in 1881. In 1887, he was about to return to England, when NSS director, James McCosh Clark, mentioned that the board had decided to wind up the company. When Charles took over, NSS had 8 (or 9) vessels, and 100 employees. When he retired, in July 1921, NSS had 40 vessels and 850 employees. Cargo had increased from 51,000 tons a year to 220,000 and passengers from 39,000 to 190,000.

After his appointment, NSS bought some second-hand screw-steamers, the Rotomahana, Waiotahi and Ohinemuri and small paddle steamers, Te Aroha and Enterprise, to work on the Waihou River. This got rid of another competitor, Hauraki Steamship Co, who sold out to NSS. Much of the expansion of the company was by takeovers. Thames River Steam Navigation Co Ltd was bought on 1 August 1890. In July 1906 NSS bought Manukau Steam Shipping Company. On 1 October 1908 Settlers' Steamship Company (SSC) merged with NSS, adding six steamers to the fleet. SSC had been formed in 1905 by the merger of Coastal Steamship and McGregor Steamship Companies. Coastal Steamship was formed in 1898.

The company slowly recovered from its near liquidation. Until 2 1/2% was paid in 1890, no dividends had been paid since 1881, but then 5% was paid in 1891, 6% 1892-6, 7% in 1897 and for many years, and 8% in 1925. 5% was paid in 1944.

By 1895 NSS was asking for urgent extension of its wharf space at Auckland to serve its growth. In the 1890s the fleet grew rapidly, with new iron ships built in Britain and timber ships in Auckland.

In 1909 NSS and Union Steam Ship (Union) aimed to save money on their repairs, when they set up a jointly owned repair company, United Repairing Co Ltd, at Quay Street, Auckland, which was next door to the NSS offices until 1962. Senior Foundry was bought by NSS in 1927 to repair plates and boilers.

Charles was also a steward of the Auckland Racing Club, an enthusiastic bowler, keenly interested in regattas and a church warden. He lived in Bassett Rd, Remuera, where he died on 13 January 1925.

Capt. Hammond took over as manager in 1921, having formerly been manager of Kaipara Steamship Company.

=== The Northern Steam Ship Company Building, Quay St ===
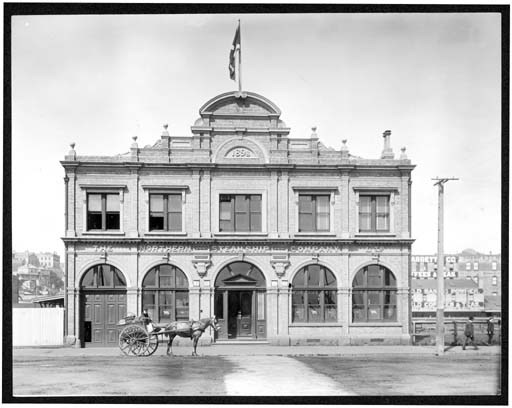
NSS building - date not stated - compare with a post 1921 photo and with Google street scene

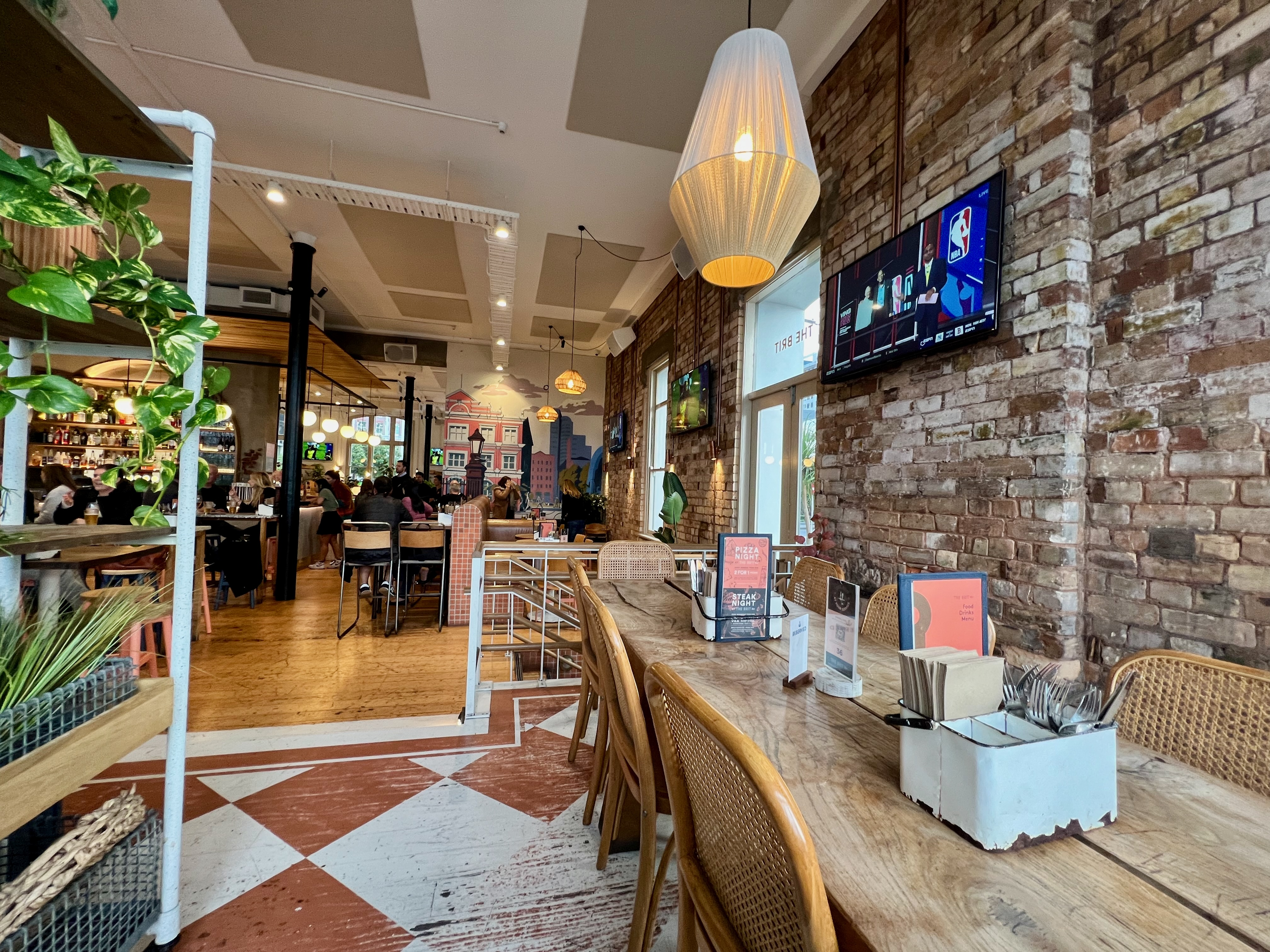
Northern Steamship bar

Charles Ranson commissioned Arthur Pollard Wilson (who also designed Strand Arcade, Naval and Family Hotel, A H Nathan Warehouse and Isaacs’ Bonded Stores) to design the £6000 (or £5000) building, with a frontage of 66 ft (20 m) to the street, and a depth of 85 ft (26 m), opposite the wharf used by their steamers, on newly reclaimed land, leased from Auckland Harbour Board (AHB). In 1899 NSS moved from Palmerston Buildings on Queen St to their new 2-storey brick building with dark green joinery, a public office, manager's office, space for other staff, telephone room and a boardroom. It had high ceilings and on each level the floor above was supported by cast iron columns. On Quay St a central door, gave access to the main office and floor above, and an eastern door accessed the wharves (now Marsden Wharf) and warehouse to the rear of the building. A boardwalk allowed passengers to cross to the steamers without walking through mud. A third floor was added in 1921 to provide accommodation and a laundry. In the 1940s many of the original features were lost. Originally the building stood alone. The land on the other side the building was their yard until the 1950s when AHB roofed it over as a garage in an attempt to compete with trucking firms. When NSS ceased trading, the building reverted to AHB. In July 1988 the Historic Places Trust listed it as "Category 1". It is now a bar.

== Decline ==
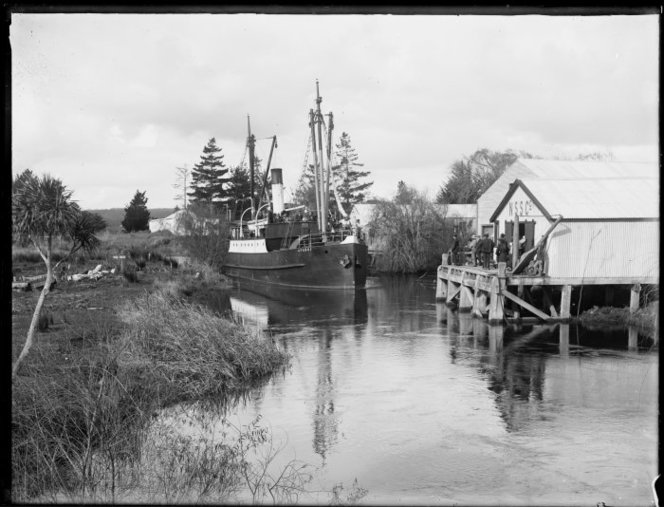
Apanui on the Awanui River, Northland - passenger service closed May 1931 _{Alexander Turnbull Library}

NSS gradually succumbed to rail and road competition and the recession from 1921.

When the North Island Main Trunk (NIMT) opened in 1908 between Auckland and Wellington, New Plymouth passenger traffic dropped. NSS and Union agreed there wasn't enough traffic for two steamers and formed a joint service. The office at Canaan Landing, served from May 1881 and providing for freight between Te Puke and Maketu, closed on 29 September 1917. By 1922, reductions in traffic resulted in 9 vessels laid up. Pay cuts later in the year resulted in a 12 week strike, with union members replaced by 'free labour'. A pay cut in 1933 again provoked a strike.

In 1925 opening of the railway to Whangārei cut passenger traffic and required reductions of fares and freight rates; the Onerahi passenger service from Whangārei ended on 24 September 1926, due to fewer passengers and charges by the railway for cargo and coal over their wharf. Bus competition saw the Waiuku ferry end on 11 April 1928, with a cargo replacement for a short time. Competition from cars, completion of the railway to Tauranga in 1927, trains not connecting with the steamer and complaints of undercutting, brought an end to the Tauranga passenger service on 2 April 1929. From the 1890s NSS had competition from oil-engined auxiliary schooners, which were much cheaper to run. By 1930 NSS had 9 of its own cargo-only auxiliary ships; Hauturu, Motu, Paroto, Otimai, Toa. Tuhoe. Pono, Torea and Waka. Many ships were laid up in Little Shoal Bay in the late 1920s. The Onehunga-New Plymouth passenger service closed on 3 May 1930, a few years after a bus service had started on the upgraded State Highway 3 (SH 3). Rail competition was also cited as the reason to end the passenger service to Russell in 1931. In 1932 dairy company shareholders at Whakatāne responded to a threat to close the railway by instructing the company to transfer its freight from NSS to the railway. In 1933 'truck rates' were introduced on the North Auckland railway, which undercut NSS's charges. The 70 mi (110 km) Auckland-Paeroa passenger service lasted until 1937, despite the railway opening to Te Aroha in 1885, though, after 1896, the river became too silted and the charges at Paeroa Railway Wharf were at a level to encourage use of the railway, so that Junction Wharf, further downstream, was used. In 1937 passenger services still ran to Algies, Coromandel, Great Barrier, Matakana, Mahurangi, One Tree Point, Waiheke, Warkworth and Whangārei. In 1938 Kawau was advertised as running summer weekend excursions to Waiheke. By 1939 the only remaining passenger steamer was Hauiti.

Auckland registered ships dropped from 226 in 1904 to 55 in 1944 and their tonnage from 20,546 to 5,627. In 1902 NSS had 28 ships totalling 6000 tons and costing an average of £34 per ton.

== 1945–1974 ==
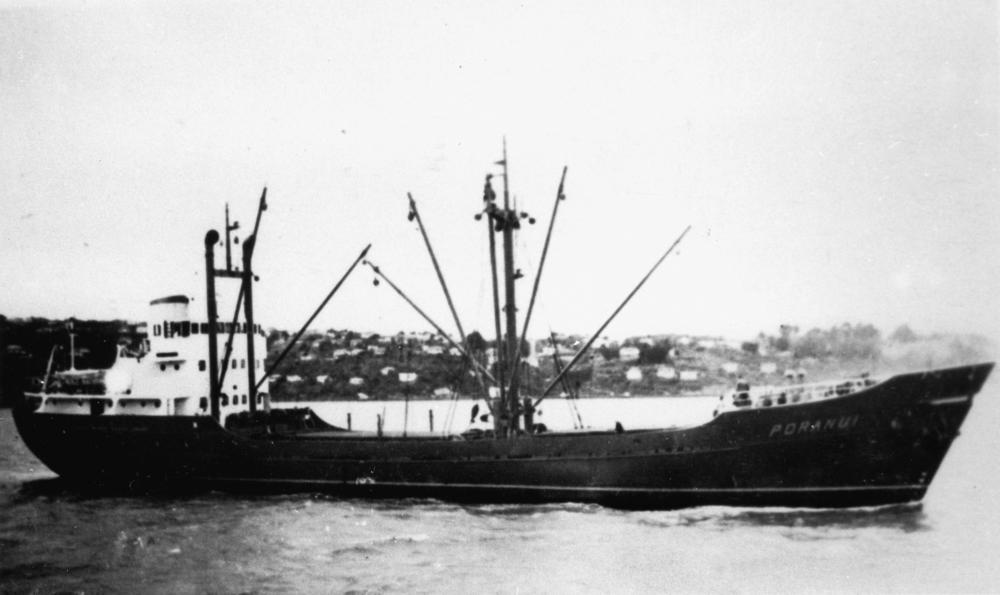
862 GRT coaster Poranui, built in 1956 by J Bodewes

By 1945 NSS was down to 10 ships, ranging from 56 to 351 tons. NSS had lost most of its trade to road and rail, so switched to inter-island trade, which it gradually lost to Cook Strait ferries from the 1960s, when it increasingly turned to coal and grain, including some trade with Australia, before losing out to coal fuelled gasworks being replaced by natural gas, a shipwreck (Maranui), trade fluctuations and reliance on the grain trade, which faltered due to a poor harvest in 1974.

NSS briefly tried replacing a ship with a partly owned trucking company, when it closed its Paeroa service in 1947.

Captain A. G. Hardy, formerly New Plymouth manager for the Waterfront Industry Commission, became NSS manager from 5 January 1947.

After the war NSS switched from serving the northern ports to linking some of them to South Island. This required increasingly larger ships, so NSS bought Apanui (1948–61), Tainui (1949–63), Hotunui (1950–67), Ratanui (1952-56), and then started building Maranui (1953–68), Maunganui (1955–71), Poranui (1956–69) and Tawanui (1959–73), Moanui (1961–66), Awanui (1962-73). A major contract in this period was shipping materials for the Manapouri Tunnel. A second Moanui (1967–75) and Seaway Princess (1967–69) were added to the fleet, the latter for a weekly Onehunga-Lyttelton ro-ro service. However, as AHB didn't build a ramp at Onehunga, she had to use the only one at Auckland, sharing it with Union, which had priority, hence her short service with NSS. In the 1960s NSS had offices at Onehunga, Tauranga and Whangārei, as well as its head office. It closed Tauranga-Timaru in July 1966 and Whangārei-Lyttelton from 30 January 1967.

By 1970 three of the remaining five ships were carrying bulk grain from South Island to Auckland, Tauranga, and, less often, Wellington, New Plymouth and Whanganui. Dido (1970–75) was added to the fleet and, being largest, was used for 10 grain trips to Australia. At that time Brierley Investments made an unsuccessful bid for the company. NSS made a record profit in 1970. By 1971 Awanui was the only general cargo vessel, running an Onehunga-Bluff-Jackson Bay round trip, but she was also adapted to carry grain in 1972. NSS added the 1562 ton Tainui II (1973–76), but there was a poor grain harvest and, after they were used to import grain from Australia, all three ships were soon idle. NSS blamed the problem on the government's grain price policy. Tainui II's last voyage brought coal to Auckland from Westport on 6 November 1974, Moanui 12 days later (or another account says her last cargo was barley from the South Island to Auckland in September) from Dunedin and Dido, the last NSS ship ever to berth, arrived on Sunday 8 December 1974. When NSS failed to change government policy, it decided in April 1975 to sell the ships and the company was taken over by Brierley. For a few years NSS continued operating forklifts and being an agent for the Japan Line.

== Fleet ==
Ship	Built	In fleet	Builder	grt	Type
Albatross	1874	1909–1910	James Barbour, Whangapoua	61	Auxiliary schooner launched on 22 April 1874 for Christopher Atwell Harris (1847-1903) at his timber mill. 79.3 ft (24.2 m) long, 20.4 ft (6.2 m) wide, 7.4 ft (2.3 m) deep, her registered weight dropped from 77 to 61 tons between 1902 and 1906. She was sold at Levuka in 1882, in Fiji in 1886, at Sydney in 1892 and was at Botany when damaged by a gale in 1898. In March 1909 she replaced Waitangi , when NSS chartered her to run a cargo only service to Waitara, until the lengthening of Claymore reduced her draught enough to replace her in August 1910. It seems she then traded cement between Whangārei and Auckland until October 1914, when she was at the centre of a drowning mystery. She wasn't registered in 1915.
Alexander Craig	1891	1908–1926	William Phillip Cameron, South Maitland, Canada	520	Alexander Craig Barque used as a coal hulk. She was built of wood for Auckland owners, including Donald Ross and Captain Davies, originally intended to carry timber, but mostly used as a collier, 163.1 ft (49.7 m) long, 34.7 ft (10.6 m) wide, 13.5 ft (4.1 m) deep. Her original name was Kathleen Hilda, until Joseph James Craig (who also owned James Craig and Selwyn Craig) renamed her in 1905, In March 1908 she was badly damaged in a storm on her way from Melbourne. Next month she was stripped to a hulk and sold to NSS in October. In 1926 she was beached on Motukorea and burnt, though her bottom timbers drifted to Saint Heliers, where they remained in 1930.
Apanui	1905	1905–1937	D.J.Dunlop & Co, Port Glasgow	243	Apanui at Auckland in 1905 Steamer launched on 16 June 1905 for NSS, arrived in Auckland via Port Said and Fremantle on 5 October, was planned to carry 148 tons of cargo, with a 3-cylinder (8.5, 14.25, 28.5 - 15)″ triple expansion engine, of 27 hp (20 kW), steel ship, 110 ft (34 m) long, 22.1 ft (6.7 m) wide, 9.2 ft (2.8 m) deep, carrying about 50 passengers. On 28 October 1909 she collided with schooner Greyhound at the mouth of the Awanui River, was blown ashore at Waiharara Heads, but floated off undamaged on the next high tide on 3 September 1913. On 25 October 1929 she lost her propeller and was towed to Auckland. From 28 May 1931, she was replaced on the Awanui route by Motu, probably because of problems with silting of the river, but continued to serve Tutukaka, Matapouri, Whananaki, Sandy Bay, Helena Bay, Mimiwhangata, Whangaruru, Kerikeri, Houhora and Parenga until 23 August 1931. She was then laid up at Auckland and, in 1937, sold to McKendrick Bros for breaking up at Auckland.
Apanui	1938	1948–1961	G. Renck, Jnr., Hamburg	296	Motor ship built for H.J. Wilson, London as Goldfinder, 130 ft (40 m) x 27.5 ft (8.4 m), draught 9 ft (2.7 m), able to carry about 480 tons, with a crew of 10. In 1942 her 8-cylinder engine was replaced by a 250 hp (190 kW) 6-cylinder engine. In 1948 her steering gear broke in the Red Sea, when she was on her way to join NSS, who renamed her Apanui in 1949, when she began a Raglan-South Island route. In 1961 she was sold to H. Williams, Cook Islands and belonged to D.C. Brown, before being declared unseaworthy and scuttled off Avatiu on 24 December 1965.
Aranui	1946	1946–1947	United Ship and Boatbuilders Ltd, Auckland	243	Motor ship, one of four sisters lighters, Avon, Melva and Rosalie, 31.49 m (103.3 ft) x 7.19 m (23.6 ft). She was launched on 25 September 1945 as US Navy YF-1046, but was amongst orders cancelled, she was completed in May 1946 and chartered by the government to NSS. September 1947 sold to Winstone Ltd. and employed mainly carrying cement from Portland to Auckland. 1960 sold to Wong Wing of Papeete and subsequently traded in the Tahiti area. On 15 September 1977 she ran aground in a storm on South Marutea Atoll and was abandoned.
Arapawa	1908	1914–1938	J. Fullerton, Merksworth Works, Paisley	291	Arapawa aground - Waitara in 1919 Steamer Arapawa was a 120.5 ft (36.7 m) long, 22.1 ft (6.7 m) wide x 9.7 ft (3.0 m) deep, 47 hp (35 kW), single-screw, schooner-rigged, steel ship, launched on 31 July 1908, with a 3-cylinder (11,18 & 31-22in) engine by Renfrew Brothers, Irvine, built for James Herbert Williams' Coastal Steamship Company, Wellington (CSC formed in 1898). In August 1905 CSC and McGregor Steamship Company merged, to form the SSC. In 1912 Patea Shipping Company re-organised. Williams took Kapiti and Arapawa, for the Wellington-Whanganui trade. Kiripaka, Mana, Kapuni and Hawera remained with Patea for its Wellington-Pātea route. In July 1914 Arapawa was sold to NSS for the Whanganui-Ōpunake-Waitara route, though initially she ran between Onehunga, Raglan, Kawhia and Waitara, from 6 August 1914. She was mainly a cargo ship, with space for 6 passengers. Due to silting caused by a strong wind, she was stranded at the entrance to the Waitara River for 3 weeks in August 1919, but little damaged. In 1931 she was dismantled at Auckland. In March 1941 she was stripped and partly broken up, before being beached in Boulder Bay, Rangitoto on 8 April 1941.
Argyle	1876	1881–1897	McQuarrie & McCallum, Auckland	159	SS Argyle Steamer with 22 berths, launched on 1 January 1876, 114.3 ft (34.8 m) long, 20 ft (6.1 m) wide x 7.3 ft (2.2 m) deep, 45 hp (34 kW). Built for A. McGregor, for the Auckland-Whangārei route, as a 3-masted schooner, with a pōhutukawa frame, kauri planks, a Fraser & Tinne compound engine, fitted aft, with 16- and 30-inch cylinders, 15-inch stroke, 4-blade screw, 5 feet 7 inches in diameter, 9 ft × 10 ft boiler of Low Moor plate, producing an average 10 kn (19 km/h; 12 mph). Her maiden voyage was on 28 February 1876. In 1881 she was taken over when NSS was formed. In October 1894 she helped rescue passengers from the SS Wairarapa wreck. Her last NSS voyage was from Waiheke on 23 July 1897. She was then sold to J.A. Elleker, Melbourne to trade to Gippsland, in 1898 she moved to Adelaide, with A.W. Sandford, in May 1903 P. Weir, in 1906 H. Weir and was broken up in 1915.
Aupouri	1905	1905–1932	D.J. Dunlop & Co., Port Glasgow	463	SS Aupouri Steamer Aupouri launched on 21 August 1905 for NSS, the older sister of Ngatiawa, both able to carry 500 tons of cargo, but only draw 5.75 ft (1.75 m), 152 ft (46 m) long, 27.1 ft (8.3 m) wide, 10 ft (3.0 m) deep. She was a steel, twin screw steamer, with two triple compound (8.5, 14.25 & 28.5 - 15)in. 55 hp (41 kW) engines. In August 1912 Ngapuhi replaced her on the Tauranga route and she was kept to replace other ships during overhauls. Her last overhaul was in September 1926. In February 1927 she collected wool from the beach at Harihari, but was laid up by 1928 in Shoal Bay due to motor competition. She was mainly used on east coast routes. She was sold for dismantling in August 1932. In 1933, she was cut up in Saint Marys Bay, scrap being stored on the Western Reclamation. Scrap from Aupouri and Wakatere was sent to Japan in 1934, when it was commented, "It will come back to us as bullets".
Awanui	1962	1962–1973	Pacific Island Shipbuilding Company, Hong Kong	1185	Motor ship built for NSS for trading on the east coast. An investigation into bulges in her bow plates was begun in February 1963 and she was repaired. In June 1966 she was the last NSS ship when the Mount Maunganui-Lyttelton route was closed. After her steel trade switched to rail, Awanui was laid up in September 1969. She was in use again by May 1970 and shipping matai timber from Okuru by October 1971. In 1973 she was sold to Unique Shipping and Trading (Private) Company, Singapore, renamed Bonawind, to Singapore Straits Pilotage Co. Pte. Ltd in 1978, renamed Wild Rover. 1982 renamed Concord Angel and owned by Concord Marine Ltd. 1986 sold to Mekong Trading S.A., Panama and renamed Mekong Express. She was 72.04 m (236.4 ft) long, 9.9 m (32 ft) wide and reported as still in the Panama area in 2023.
Bell Bird	1906	-1945	George Fraser, Johnsonville	88	Bell Bird being built at Johnsonville Bell Bird, sometimes referred to as Bellbird, was launched on 9 May 1906, built of red gum, for her builder to emigrate to Helensville via Melbourne, Hobart, Bluff, Dunedin, Lyttelton, Wellington, Nelson and New Plymouth. Kaipara Steamship Company bought her in 1907 and George Turnbull Niccol bought that company from its receivers in December 1912. He was also a NSS director from 1918 to 1925 and was registered as owner of Bell Bird, which was 85 ft (26 m) long, 18.7 ft (5.7 m) wide, 7.8 ft (2.4 m) deep and had a 15 hp (11 kW) triple expansion engine able to drive her at up to 9 kn (17 km/h; 10 mph). In 1917 she was damaged by fire at Helensville. In 1929 she sprang a leak and had to be towed by Ruawai. The Helensville-Dargaville service ended when the railway opened in 1942. Bellbird then became a Class S-120 salvage and repair ship with a diesel engine the alterations costing £33,000. After the war she was put up for sale in Sydney as a NSS ship.
Chelmsford	1886	1889–1928	James Halstead, Lavender Bay, Sydney	122	Chelmsford sank in 1928 Steamer 89.8 ft (27.4 m) long, 18.5 ft (5.6 m) wide, 8.8 ft (2.7 m) deep, built for NSS was launched on 23 July 1886. Her topsides were of Oregon, the deck of kauri and she had space for about 25 passengers. The Plenty and Sons, 40 hp (30 kW) compound surface engines, fitted by Perdrian and West, Balmain, drove a single screw at up to 9.75 kn (18.06 km/h; 11.22 mph). She was chartered by Hawkesbury River Steam Co. for Sydney-Hawkesbury trade, until sale to Edward C. Windsor, Auckland, for £3,200 in June 1886. She replaced Hannah Mokau, serving ports along the coast from Manukau, being first modified to carry cattle. 1886-88 she ran aground thrice at Ōpōtiki. In 1889 bought by NSS for Whangārei to East Coast services for £2,500. She was laid up from her Whangārei run during the 1921 recession, though her last trip was probably in December 1921. However, when she sank in a storm in 1928, it was reported she had only been laid up at Shoal Bay for 3 years. On 22 June she was sunk in the Western Reclamation, though her bow rose in 1930.
Clansman	1884	1884–1934	Blackwood & Gordon, Port Glasgow	591. 635 from 1904	Clansman at Kawau about 1910 Clansman was rebuilt in 1904 Skylight on display at the Auckland Maritime Museum Steamer launched on 14 April 1884, with 3 masts and a screw for NSS to serve Russell, Whangaroa, and Mangōnui. 191.7 ft (58.4 m) long, 26.1 ft (8.0 m) wide, 10.8 ft (3.3 m) deep, 99 hp (74 kW), with a compound engine (26, 48 - 36)″, driving her at 12.5 kn (23.2 km/h; 14.4 mph). The saloon had revolving chairs, 61 berths, white and gold decoration and skylights with Scottish scenes etched on the glass. Clansman left Port Glasgow on 15 July 1884 and partly steamed and sailed via Waterford, St. Vincent for coal, St. Helena for water, Sandy Bay and Hobart for coal, arriving at Auckland, rigged as a barque, on 16 October 1884. On 10 August 1888 she collided with Mana off Mercury Island. In 1904 a motor boat was added on her deck, which was relaid, and smaller masts, electric lights and a new boiler were fitted. On 2 September 1907 she collided with the scow, Herald, on 24 June 1914 sank the scow Pahiki and on 26 August 1926 collided with Elsie Mary, all in Auckland Harbour. On 16 March 1931 she broke her tail-shaft off Bird Rock, Motukōkako Island, was towed to Auckland by paddle tug Lyttelton, stripped of all her fittings within a week, probably due to railway competition on the Bay of Islands and Whangārei routes, and sold for scrap in August 1934.
Clansman	1930	1930–1957	George Turnbull Niccol, Freemans Bay	235	Motor ship launched as Waka on 25 February 1930 for NSS, of steel, with 2 steel masts, served Tauranga from 7 April 1930 and renamed Clansman from 1 October 1934, 116 ft (35 m)) long, 28 ft (8.5 m) wide, 6.6 ft (2.0 m) draught, with twin 152 hp (113 kW) Gardner diesels, burning about 13 imp gal (59 L) an hour, from 3,600 imp gal (16,000 L) tanks and driving her at up to 10 kn (19 km/h; 12 mph), with a carrying capacity of about 300 tons, In August 1939 she was damaged on a reef at Cape Colville and grounded at Whakatāne in 1940. In May 1956 she was stranded as a constructive total loss on rocks at Whakatāne Bar. 1957 sold to Charles Bailey & Son Limited. 1963 broken up at Auckland after lying derelict in St Mary's Bay for many years.
Claymore	1902	1908–1940	Murdoch & Murray, Port Glasgow	210. 258 from 1910	Claymore 1902 Steamer built of steel, 113 ft (34 m) long (from 1910 133.2 ft (40.6 m)), 21.1 ft (6.4 m) wide, 9.8 ft (3.0 m) deep, 54 hp (40 kW), 3-cylinder engine (12, 19, 31 - 22)″ by Muir & Houston Ltd., Kinning Park for W.A. McGregor, Auckland. She was launched on 3 June 1902, had a single screw and oak and walnut panelling. Her delivery voyage from 24 July to 26 October, via St. Vincent, Cape Town and Hobart was mainly under sail as a brigantine. She was used between Auckland, Waiwera and Warkworth. 1905 sold to SSC. 23 December 1905 sank the Kapanui, with the loss of 5 lives. 1907 sold to William J. Parker and James Smith, Auckland. On 1 October 1908 SSC merged with NSS, adding Claymore, Gael, Kapanui, Kawau, Kotiti and Orewa to the fleet. 1910 cut in half and lengthened. In 1930 her saloon was enclosed to add 8 berths. 1938 laid up. 1940 used as a salvage vessel working on the recovery of bullion from the Niagara. 1940 used by the Navy and as a Boom Defence Vessel. She was then laid up at Devonport Naval Base. In February 1953 she was to be filled with old explosives and used by Black Prince for target practice off the Hauraki Gulf. However, instead, on 20 April 1953, she was sold for £125 and broken up at Auckland.
Coromandel	1879	1895–1912	James Holmes, North Shore	68	Coromandel in 1905 in Whangārei harbour Steamer of 25 hp (19 kW), with a compound engine driving a single screw. She was launched on 26 April 1879 and her first trial trip from Thames was on 24 June 1879, for Coromandel Steam Boat Co. Ltd (CSB), with a 25 hp (19 kW) 2-cylinder (13 1/2, 23 -15)″ compound, surface-condensing engine, by A&G Price, she was 99.8 ft (30.4 m) long, 16.1 ft (4.9 m) wide x 6.6 ft (2.0 m) deep. In August 1895 NSS took over CSB, around 1898 to 1900 Rotomahana took over the Coromandel route and Coromandel ran Waiheke and Ruthe's Island trips. 1912 dismantled at Auckland.
Daphne	1907	1908–1931	William Hoile Brown, Auckland	192	Daphne launch in 1907 Steamer 111.6 ft (34.0 m) long, 20.5 ft (6.2 m) wide x 8.1 ft (2.5 m) deep, 55 hp (41 kW), 11 kn (20 km/h; 13 mph), built of kauri and totara, launched on 16 March 1907 for A.J. Farmer, Kawau & W.H. Brown, Auckland. Her maiden voyage to Waiwera was on Saturday 13 July 1907, taking 2hrs 15mins; Kawau took about 3hrs. The next month she was stranded for a fortnight on a shoal in the Mahurangi River. In 1908 she was sold to NSS for the Kawau-Mangawai route. Her last scheduled run was to Coromandel and Colville on 27 August 1928. She was then laid up at Paeroa, brought to Auckland and then stripped in 1931. Her hull was sold to A.G. Frankham Ltd, who fitted her with a 248 hp (185 kW) Fairbanks Morse diesel engine, her first trip to Awanui being on 24 November 1938, renamed as Awanui. On 5 September 1939 the Navy chartered her as an examination vessel. 18 November 1941 released for coastal trade. In August 1942 Awanui was sold to South Taranaki Shipping Company, but the hull was condemned, beached in St Mary's Bay and broken up in 1956. In 1943 the engines were put into Tiroa.
Dido	1963	1970–1975	Charles Hill & Sons, Bristol	1589	Motor ship launched on 10 June 1963 and completed in October 1963 for Bristol Steam Navigation Co 261 ft (80 m) long, 39.9 ft (12.2 m) wide x 16.8 ft (5.1 m) deep, with a 2,175 hp (1,622 kW) 9-cyl. 2 S.C.S.A. (340 mm × 570 mm) Polar MN19S engine by British Polar Engines Ltd., Glasgow, driving her at up to 13.5 kn (25.0 km/h; 15.5 mph). In 1970 NSS bought her to carry wheat from South Island to Auckland. On 9 December 1974 she was the last NSS ship to be laid up and was sold to Metcalfe Motor Coasters, London in 1975 and renamed Gorsethorn in 1977. She ended in controversy, after being overhauled by Marine Services Convoyages, La Rochelle in 1990. She was renamed Déesse de la Démocratie and was to be an offshore radio station for Chinese dissidents. On 13 May 1990 she arrived at Keelung to have a transmitter fitted, but 2 days later was placed under armed guard and the transmitter was seized by Customs. In April 1991 a businessman, Wu Meng-wu, bought the ship from the China Shipping Association for $550,000, for a Tianaman Square museum and moved her to Anping. In 2003 Kaohsiung port authority said the ship had paid no fees, was listing, rusty and a safety hazard, so that in September 2003 she went for scrapping in Taipei.
Douglas	1882	1882–1898	H. McQuarrie & McCallum, Mechanics Bay	93	Steamer launched on 28 September 1882 to replace Fingal on the Mercury Bay route, with wooden hull, 83.4 ft (25.4 m) long, 17.8 ft (5.4 m) wide, 7.8 ft (2.4 m) deep, with a 20 hp (15 kW), Fraser & Tinne engine, acquired by NSS while building. 1898 sold to G.H. Stubbs, Waitara. On 7 July 1900 she was washed onto the North Spit of the Mōkau River, because a rope fouled her propeller, her engine was swamped on the bar and she was underpowered.
Eliza			James Clare, Ponsonby		A steam launch, or tug on the Waihou in 1898 with a crew of 4. Built "some years before" 1893.
Elsie	1904	1906–1928	Bailey & Lowe, Freemans Bay	21	Elsie was launched in 1904 Auxiliary ketch of kauri and pōhutukawa, launched on 22 March 1904 for Manukau Steam Navigation Co. Ltd. She was 60.7 ft (18.5 m) long, 18.4 ft (5.6 m) wide, 3.6 ft (1.1 m) deep and registered as having an oil engine by 1921. In July 1906 NSS bought Manukau Steam Shipping Company, including Elsie and Weka. In 1918 Elsie was at Waipu, and in 1922 was serving Kopu and Tairua. She was sold to South Westland Shipping Co in 1928 to serve Hokitika, Ōkārito, Bruce Bay, Paringa, and Okuru. She was wrecked 6 mi (9.7 km) north of Bruce Bay on 15 September 1930 after engine failure. Her engine was recovered.
Enterprise	1865	1890–1898	Holmes Bros, North Shore	22, 82 from 1875	Enterprise in 1870s Paddle steamer launched on 8 December 1864 as Waitemata for Waitemata Steam Ferry Co, with engines by Vickery & Masefield, 70 ft (21 m) long, 16 ft (4.9 m) wide, 4.10 ft (1.25 m) deep, 32 hp (24 kW), able to run backwards, or forwards at about 6 kn (11 km/h; 6.9 mph). In 1866 she was sold to D.D. Fremantle, then to John & James Holmes. Rebuilt and renamed No.2 Enterprise, though usually known as Enterprise No.2. 1871 sold to James Morton, 1872 to G. Fraser, J. Waymouth, J. Batger, 1873 to John & James Holmes, 1875 enlarged from 22 to 82 tons. Re-registered as Enterprise, 1877 sold to John Hay, 1878 to Auckland & North Shore Steam Ferry Co. Ltd, 1882 to Geo. Fraser, 1890 to A. McGregor, 1890 to D. Ross, H. Worsop, F. Jagger, then to NSS to serve Thames and Whangārei Harbour. In 1898 she was stripped of engines and other valuables, sold to Auckland Regatta Committee and, on 7 January 1899, Enterprise was blown up with gun cotton, off Cheltenham Beach, as a spectacular part of the regatta, producing a large column of water and debris.
Eure	1886	1913–1939	Ateliers et chantiers du Havre	1589	Coal hulk
Falcon	1895	1897 - post 1909	D. Greenwood, Onehunga		Steam launch with a 5.5 hp (4.1 kW), non condensing engine, 46 ft (14 m) long, 8 ft (2.4 m) wide, 5.3 ft (1.6 m) deep, launched on 25 July 1895 for T.H. Barwell, Onehunga, as a fishing fleet tender and for cargo, excursions and a weekly ferry. In June 1896 she was moved on trolleys from Onehunga to Auckland, for use in whaling by Cook Brothers, Whangamumu. From September 1896 to 1908 NSS used her to serve Coromandel and Cabbage Bay (Colville) and she was last surveyed in 1909.
Fingal	1879	1881–1909	H. Niccol, North Shore	34	Fingal at Hokianga Steamer launched on 15 December 1879 for A. McGregor to serve Tauranga, Mercury Bay and Tairua, of pōhutukawa and kauri, with a Fraser & Tinne 9 hp (6.7 kW) compound engine, driving a single screw, 67.6 ft (20.6 m) long, 13.2 ft (4.0 m) wide, 6.4 ft (2.0 m) deep, In 1881 she became part of the NSS fleet, initially serving Mangawai and Mercury Bay, In 1907 she was replaced by Wave between Tauranga and Matatā. 1909 broken up at Auckland. Her engines were then used in Kapui.
Gael	1904	1908–1931	Charles Bailey junior, Freemans Bay	83	1904 launch of Gael Steamer launched on 7 May 1904 for W.A. McGregor, replacing Kawau on the Mangawai run. She was built of kauri and ironbark, with an engine from Southern Cross and had cabins for about 22 passengers. 84.8 ft (25.8 m) long, 17.5 ft (5.3 m) wide, 6.7 ft (2.0 m) deep, with a 20 hp (15 kW) engine driving her at up to 10.5 kn (19.4 km/h; 12.1 mph). In 1905 she was sold to SSC and joined NSS on its merger with SSC on 1 October 1908. Her regular route from 1910 to 1926 was Auckland to Pipiroa, Hopai, Ngatea (Orchard), Kerepehi, Waikaka and Tahuna, along the Piako River. From 1927 she was laid up, until sold to South Westland Shipping Company (SWSC) and converted to a motor ship, with a Gardner engine in May 1931. On 28 January 1941 she was chartered as HMS Gael, returning to SWSC on 27 April 1941. In 1948 she was sold to Southern Cross Shipping Company (managed by John Holm Ltd) and, on 18 April 1952, wrecked on The Beef Barrels (Kahikatoa), on the approach to French Pass, whilst carrying apples from Motueka to Nelson. Her crew were rescued. The engine, propeller and other items were salvaged in 1955.
Gairloch	1884	1884–1903	Blackwood & Gordon, Port Glasgow	373	SS Gairloch at Onehunga in June 1899 Steamer Gairloch was a 164.9 ft (50.3 m) long, 23 ft (7.0 m) wide, 8.7 ft (2.7 m) deep, twin screw, passenger/cargo, steel ship, with a 2-cylinder (16, 31 × 21in), 85 hp (63 kW) engine, launched on 22 August 1884 for NSS. In 1886 she was lengthened by 17.5 ft (5.3 m) by Cable & Co, Wellington. In 1887 she broke her port propeller shaft between New Plymouth and Onehunga. She had a major refit in 1901. On 5 January 1903 she was wrecked, without loss of life, on rocks off Ōakura, on passage from Kawhia to Ōpunake. An inquiry found that the captain kept too close to the shore on a dark night and suspended his certificate for 3 months. Parts of the wreck remained on the beach in 2020.
Glenelg	1878	1881–1904	Blackwood & Gordon, Port Glasgow	288	Glenelg at Railway Wharf in 1905 Steamer was a 134.8 ft (41.1 m) long, 22.2 ft (6.8 m) wide, 9.1 ft (2.8 m) deep, single-screw, passenger/cargo, iron ship, with a 2-cylinder (22, 40 x 27in), 75 hp (56 kW) engine, launched on 11 October 1878 from the Castle Yard for Alexander McGregor, with berths for 48 passengers. She left Greenock on 21 November 1878 and came via Cape Verde and Hobart, where her captain loaded 10 tons of coal, but declined another 10. She ran short of coal near Manawatāwhi and sent a boat ashore near Cape Maria to send a message. The boat overturned and a crewman drowned. Glenelg arrived at Mangōnui on 23 March, towed by Argyle, and Auckland next day. During trials she reached just over 9 knots (17 km/h; 10 mph), then narrowly avoided Albatross, but sank her captain's gig. Her maiden voyage was to Whitianga and Tauranga on 4 April 1879. In 1881 Glenelg was taken over when NSS was formed. She was one of the ships which failed to tow Triumph off the rocks at Tiritiri Matangi in 1883. In 1903 she ran aground at Whanganui when avoiding another ship. In late 1904 she was sold to James Smith to carry coal from Whangārei, 1933 to W.R.McKenzie, Auckland for a hulk, 1934 to G.H. George & Company, Auckland, 4 December 1944 sunk beside Wainui as a Whangaparāoa breakwater.
Greyhound	1899	1913–1919	Lane & Brown, Totara North	103	Greyhound in 1902 Auxiliary schooner built for J.A. Subritsky, Awanui, with a kauri hull, 60 hp (45 kW) Union Oil engine, 95.2 ft (29.0 m) long, 21.2 ft (6.5 m) wide, 6.7 ft (2.0 m) deep. In 1902 she searched for survivors from SS Elingamite. In 1913 NSS bought her to serve Hokianga. On 5 October 1918 she was damaged by fire and laid up, until sold to Morris Hedstrom Ltd, Suva in June 1919. 1923 to Fiji Shipping Company, Suva. On 27 July 1927 she was wrecked on Nasilai Reef, near Suva, where Syria was wrecked in 1863.
Hauiti	1911	1911–1941	George Niccol, Freemans Bay	148. 156 from 1947.	Hauiti on her maiden voyage to Warkworth on 10 January 1912 Steamer launched on 23 November 1911 for NSS, with engines from Kapanui, initially for the Warkworth route. She had 30 berths, a speed of 10.5 kn (19.4 km/h; 12.1 mph), was 100.2 ft (30.5 m) long, 20 ft (6.1 m) wide, 9.4 ft (2.9 m) deep and later used for Waiheke services. In 1917 she worked to Tahuna. On 15 November 1939 the Navy took her as an examination vessel at Auckland. By 1946 she was used as Tāmaki Base tender. 1947 sold to South Westland Shipping Company. Converted to a motor ship and passenger areas removed. 24 April 1954 wrecked on Awash Rocks in Cook Strait, on passage Motueka-Wellington. A court decided there was an error of judgement, but not neglect of duty.
Hauturu	1927	1927–1952	George Brown & Co Greenock	284	Hauturu at New Plymouth Estrella del Mar about 1954 Motor ship launched on 7 April 1927 for NSS. 133.1 ft (40.6 m) long, 27.5 ft (8.4 m) wide, 8.7 ft (2.7 m) deep, with 2 × 150 hp (110 kW) 2SA oil engines by J & G C Bolinder, driving a twin screw. She was similar to Otimai. On her delivery voyage via Panama she averaged 8.1 kn (15.0 km/h; 9.3 mph), using sails in favourable winds. She replaced Ngapuhi when the New Plymouth service became cargo only and where, in 1931, she broke a propeller shaft. In 1952 she was too small for the Lyttelton route, so she was replaced by Ratanui, sold to E. Savoie, Nouméa and renamed Estrella Del Mar. From 1953 William Collins & Sons Pty. Ltd, Brisbane used her as a gravel lighter, selling to Kleinschmitt Brothers in 1960. She was scuttled in Moreton Bay on 17 December 1983, as part of Curtin Artificial Reef.
Hotunui	1949	1950–1967	Kalmar Varv, Kalmar	594	Motor ship 52.4 m (172 ft) long, 8.7 m (29 ft) wide, built as Fenja for Rederi A/B Eystresalt, Västervik. 1950 sold to NSS, renamed Hotunui and used between Whangārei, Tauranga, Lyttelton and Dunedin. 1967 sold to Luggate Packers and used as helicopter base-ship for South Island deerstalkers. 1969 chartered by Capricorn Fisheries, Wellington for cray fishing. Named CHM 190. 1972 sold to Alcon Company, New Hebrides and took tuna from fishing boats to Singapore. Inn 1977 she was renamed Alco Trento and then Jado Trader. She was in Guanaja harbour for about 5 years, until 1987, when she was sunk as a dive wreck to the south of the island, east of South West Cay.
Huia	1878	1924–1927	Richard Henry Yeoman, Auckland	129	Huia, probably at Wellington in 1902 Steamer launched on 14 November 1878 for a cargo and passenger service between Wellington and Whanganui for Charles Seager, who from March 1879 was also in partnership with W. Bishop and P. Moeller, then S.J. Johnston. She was 120 ft (37 m) long, 16 ft (4.9 m) wide, 8 ft (2.4 m) deep, with a 2-cylinder (13, 22 - 16)″ compound engine, by Thomas Taylor Masefield & Co, Auckland (previously Vickery & Masefield), of 25 hp (19 kW). In March 1881 she ran aground at Whanganui, in September 1889 and July 1898 at Foxton, Patea in June 1900 and Motueka in February 1903. In 1884 she was bought by J. Joseph and her engine was moved forward about 1900. Wellington & Wanganui Steam Packet Company Limited bought her in 1901. After WWSP was wound up in 1917 she was sold to W.H. Brewer, 1924 to C.V. Clare & H.M. Warner. In 1921 she ran for Waikato Shipping Co, between Onehunga and Port Waikato until the company failed. A 1924 letter from NSS says they were 'friends' and owners of the ship in trust for the Company. She was bought as she had been 'interfering with our Whangārei trade'. In 1927 she and Kanieri were dismantled at Auckland and their hulls sunk in deep water on the west side of the Western Reclamation.
Iona	1875	1881–1899	H. Niccol, North Shore	220	Steamer of 65 hp (48 kW), 140 ft (43 m) long, 19.2 ft (5.9 m) wide, 8.6 ft (2.6 m), launched on 16 January 1875, with a hull of kauri and pōhutukawa, 2-cylinder (20", 38"), compound engine driving a single screw, by Fraser & Tinne, for Captain McGregor and his syndicate. She was always based in Auckland and replaced Rowena on the east coast route to Mangōnui. On 22 March 1879 she collided very slowly with the brigantine, Linda Weber, when approaching the Railway Wharf at night, damaging equipment on both ships. In 1881, she was among the first in the NSS fleet and was mentioned as being laid up in 1900. However, her last sailings seem to have been to Kūaotunu, Mercury Bay and Kennedy Bay in 1898, in 1899 she dragged her mooring, whilst laid up, and may have been transferred to G. Fraser in 1900. 1903 dismantled. 1909 broken up.
Kaituna	1906	1906–1927	Bailey & Lowe	8	Kaituna at Katikati Motor launch on Kaituna River serving Maketu and Canaan's Landing, near Te Puke. An oil engine, built by Union Gas Engine Co, drove her at 7.5 kn (13.9 km/h; 8.6 mph), 35 ft (11 m) x 10 ft (3.0 m) x 3.9 ft (1.2 m), with space for 10 tons of cargo. She was towed from Auckland by Aupouri and arrived on 25 June 1906. In 1907 she replaced Katikati on a twice weekly Tauranga-Katikati service. From 1917 she was a tender in Auckland, had a new engine in 1922 by J. Adams, sold to Compton & Morrison and renamed Lone Star in 1927 and, on 19 December 1928, caught fire off Narrow Neck and her remains drifted onto the rocks at Maungauika.
Kanieri	1886	1893–1927	William Denny & Bros.	203	Kanieri at Blenheim, maybe in 1887 Steamer of 20 hp (15 kW), with a 2-cylinder (15, 26 x 15"), compound engine driving a single-screw, 105 ft (32 m) long, 21.1 ft (6.4 m) wide, 8 ft (2.4 m), launched on 29 October 1886 for Union. Her delivery voyage from Port Glasgow to Port Chalmers took 118½ days, rigged as a brigantine, passing by Inaccessible Island and the Crozet Islands. She was designed for the Wellington-Blenheim service, with 24 berths, working with Waihi, her predecessor on the route, and first arrived in Blenheim on 10 May 1887. She was laid up in 1891, due to silting of the Ōpaoa River, and sold to NSS in July 1893. She served Raglan, Kawhia and Waitara. In 1896 she caught fire at Onehunga, causing £300 worth of damage. She ran aground at Waitara in June 1902, due to steering problems. In 1903 she was replaced on the west coast route by Kia ora, ran on the east coast to Whangārei, until September 1922, and was then dismantled. In 1911 she grounded at Whangārei. She was buried on the west side of the Western Reclamation, with Huia, about March 1927, so that their masts were below low tide level, though possibly because they were flattened.
Kapanui	1898	1908–1909	Robert Logan Sr., Auckland	129	Kapanui on the Devonport Steam Ferry slip after the collision in 1905 Steamer was 102 ft (31 m) long, 18.6 ft (5.7 m) wide, 7 ft (2.1 m) deep, of 32 hp (24 kW), with a compound engine driving a single screw at up to 11.5 kn (21.3 km/h; 13.2 mph), launched on 3 October 1898 for the CSC, which became SSC, and joined NSS on its merger with SSC on 1 October 1908. On 23 March 1899 Kapanui was hit by McGregor Steamship's Rose Casey at Warkworth, though without major damage. On 23 December 1905 she was sunk in collision with Claymore as the ships rounded North Head, five lives being lost. A hearing decided that the Kapanui's captain changed course without warning when he noticed a navigation light had gone out. His certificate was suspended for a year, but a jury found him not guilty of manslaughter. Kapanui was later salvaged and the hole repaired between 15 January and 7 February 1906. Photographs before and after the collision show some alterations were made during repair. At Warkworth, on 12 August 1909, she was burnt out, the fire probably starting in the engine room. She was towed back to Auckland, where the engines were salvaged and used in Hauiti.
Kapiti	1902	1938–1950	J. Fullerton, Merksworth Works, Paisley	249	Kapiti at Whanganui in 1925 Motor ship Kapiti was a 119.4 ft (36.4 m) long, 21.2 ft (6.5 m) wide, 8.8 ft (2.7 m) deep, 35 hp (26 kW), single-screw, passenger/cargo, steel ship, launched in October 1902, with a 2-cylinder (14 & 29 - 20in) 125 psi (860 kPa) engine by Ross & Duncan, Glasgow, for CSC and registered in Wellington on 10 March 1903. As above, in 1912 Patea Shipping Company re-organised. Williams took Kapiti and Arapawa, for Wellington-Whanganui. In 1930 she was converted to a motor ship, with a 6-cylinder 137 hp (102 kW) engine by Norris, Henty & Gardner & Co. In October 1938 she was sold to NSS, to work to Whangārei, in 1950 to E. Savoie, Nouméa and renamed El Retiro, in 1952 to D. Gubbay and on 6, or, more probably, 21 May 1953, was wrecked in Segond Channel, whilst salvaging war material dumped off Million Dollar Point, after touching a reef and being holed.
Kapui	1902	1908–1915	Lane & Sons, Totara North	59	Kapui at Silverdale Steamer began running in December 1902 for CSC, which became SSC in 1905 and merged with NSS on 1 October 1908. 60.1 ft (18.3 m) long, 14.6 ft (4.5 m) wide, 5.8 ft (1.8 m) deep, 30 hp (22 kW). In 1915 she was sold to E.J. Jones and in 1919 to Northern Fishing Company, both of Whangārei. 1920 to Frank B. Lett, Waitara. 1926 to Arthur B. Ogle, Waitara. 1928 to Taranaki Shipping Company Limited. 1931 steam replaced by oil engine. 21 August 1934, wrecked Mōkau River bar after her engine was swamped by a wave and soon covered with sand.
Katikati	1878	1881–1911	T. Niccol, North Shore	36	Katikati at Victoria Wharf, Tauranga 1883 A small, shallow draught, composite, steamer, with fore-and-aft schooner rig, launched by Niccol on 22 October 1878, to link the new settlement of Katikati with Rowena at Tauranga, 55 ft (17 m) x 13.5 ft (4.1 m), draught 3.5 ft (1.1 m) with an 8 passenger cabin and about 25 tons of cargo, with a Fraser & Tinne 8 hp (6.0 kW), compound engine and a single screw at about 8 kn (15 km/h; 9.2 mph). Built for the Rowena's owners, James Macfarlane & Partners, Auckland, she passed to NSS on its formation in 1881, by which time she had been outgrown by the trade and was also serving Maketu, Canaan and Te Puke. In April 1885 she was transferred to Whangārei, where she was scuttled at the wharf to extinguish a fire in August 1885. By 1900 she was trading between Tauranga and Maketu. In 1911 her engine was removed and she became a lighter at Ōpōtiki, though she was also reported as being towed there in 1914. She remained registered as a NSS hulk until after 1925.
Kawau	1899	1908–1939	Robert Logan Sr., Auckland	99	Kawau at Auckland Kauri steamer for 40 passengers and 60 tons of cargo, 85 ft (26 m) x 17.5 ft (5.3 m) x 6.5 ft (2.0 m), A&G Price compound engine (10, 22)″ working at up to 130 psi (900 kPa), launched on 25 July 1899 by Logan Bros for Mr Hick-Ross, manager of Kawau Island. She reached 10.5 kn (19.4 km/h; 12.1 mph) on trial. Her maiden voyage to Mangawhai was on 30 August 1899. In 1901 she was sold to SSC and joined NSS on the merger with SSC on 1 October 1908. Her service ended in March 1939, when Hauiti took over some of her routes. At the start of the war she became an examination ship, until replaced by Ikatere in 1940, after which she was dismantled and used as a yacht club-house in the Tāmaki River.
Kia Ora	1896	1903–1907	R. Duncan	307	Kia Ora at Onehunga in 1907 Steel, 2 screw steamer with 2 masts launched on 11 May 1896 by Robert Duncan & Co, Port Glasgow for McGregor Steam Ship. 120.2 ft (36.6 m) x 23.1 ft (7.0 m) x 12.3 ft (3.7 m), 2 x triple expansion (9.5, 15, 25 x 18in), 65 hp (48 kW) engines by Muir & Houston Ltd. In 1898 she was sold to Union, in 1903 to NSS and, on 6 June 1907, was wrecked on Piritoki Reef, off Tirua Point, en route from Waitara to Kawhia in fog. The captain and two passengers drowned. An inquiry found that the ship was 7 miles off course, that it was obvious perjury had been committed, recommended a law change that no liquor could be supplied to crew without the order of the captain and forwarded the chief officer's certificate to the Minister for Marine, who found no cause for further action and returned it.
Kopu	1897	1897 - c1935/1936	John Young, Thames.	18 net	Kopu, preserved at Paeroa Maritime Park Kopu and Manaia about 1912 Paddle steamer, probably built by Robert P. Gibbons, who ran a sawmill at Kopu, with John Young fitting the engines. She was bought by NSS and used to tow up to two barges on the Piako and Waihou rivers. She had a 13 hp (9.7 kW), 8" cylinder engine, working up to 120 psi (830 kPa), an average speed around 8 kn (15 km/h; 9.2 mph) and was 60 ft (18 m) long, 13 ft (4.0 m) wide, or 21 ft (6.4 m) over her paddle boxes. In 1935 she sank at her Waihou River mooring, near Ngahina Wharf, north west of Paeroa, probably due to vandals turning a valve and filling her with water. In 1980 she was raised and moved to a mud berth and, in 1999, her remnants preserved at Paeroa Historical Maritime Park.
Kotiti	1898	1908–1926	Robert Logan Sr., Auckland	58, 62 from 1926.	Kotiti in 1901 Steamer launched on 12 April 1898, 75 ft (23 m) x 17 ft (5.2 m) x 6 ft (1.8 m), machinery by S. McCoskrie & Son, Chapel Street, 14 hp (10 kW), with a compound engine, driving a single screw, built for R. Logan Jnr. Designed for the trade to Warkworth up the Mahurangi River. 1898 sold to CSC, which became SSC in 1905 and merged with NSS on 1 October 1908. She was laid up from her Matakana run during the 1921 recession and sold to C.T.J. Anderson, Lyttelton in 1926, to Kotiti Shipping Company, Lyttelton in 1927 and an oil engine installed, 1929 to H. Soares, Karamea, 1929 to Oparara Shipping Company, Westport. 10 October 1931 missing with all hands between Westport and Foxton.
Lion		1910c - 1919	Not known	15	Steam tug burnt to the waterline at Paeroa wharf on 30 December 1919. The engine and boiler were salvaged.
Little George		1883–1912 or later	Not known	4	Steam launch with a 4 hp (3.0 kW), non condensing engine, driving a single screw, in use from at least 1883. She was valued at £275 in 1885. Use as a feeder vessel at Whitianga and reportedly taken in 1912. She linked to Gumtown and Mercury Bay, carrying cargo such as kauri gum. The design of Ariana, at Historical Maritime Park, Paeroa, is based on that of Little George.
Macgregor	1881	1881–1888	McQuarrie & McCallum, Auckland	255	Macgregor Steamer built for A. McGregor, Auckland, to serve Waitara, 133 ft (41 m) x 21 ft (6.4 m) x 8.9 ft (2.7 m), with berths for 24 passengers, built of kauri, on iron frames. On her trial trip on 29 September 1881 her Fraser & Tinne 70 psi (480 kPa) engines drove her at 9.25 knots (17.13 km/h; 10.64 mph). Named to distinguish her from the 1871 Frisco Mail Steamer McGregor. In 1881, she was among the first in the NSS fleet. 4 May 1885 collided with Wellington in the Hauraki Gulf. On 11 August 1887 she hit the Whanganui bar, breaking her rudder and propeller. She used her sails and was towed to Onehunga by Staffa. In January 1888 she was sold to the French government for use as a gunboat in New Caledonia. Glenelg replaced her on services to Whanganui and she left for Nouméa about 21 January. Her registration transferred to S.A. Joseph, Sydney and then J. Montefiore of Noumea, both in 1888, to Burns Philp & Co in 1895, 1898 to G.H. Gallop & Laurie, Perth, 1900 to Bernard Byrnes, Sydney, 1907 converted to hulk.
Manaia	1898	1912–1926	William Denny & Bros.	1159	Manaia aground A 48th scale model of Manaia Steamer launched on 24 December 1897 as Rotoiti for Union was a 220 ft (67 m) x 33.1 ft (10.1 m) x 13.2 ft (4.0 m) deep, steel, with 2 x 3-cylinder (13 1/2, 20 1/2, 31 1/2 × 27)″ engines of 108 hp (81 kW), driving twin screws. In August 1912 she was sold to NSS for the Whangārei route, renamed Manaia and her accommodation increased for 350 passengers, 209 saloon and 73 steerage. She replaced Ngapuhi on the route, providing 3 overnight trips a week in each direction. On 10 June 1926, en route from Tauranga to Auckland, she was caught by a strong set and grounded on Slipper Island (Whakahau), without loss of life, close to where Te Teko was wrecked in 1920. Her captain and helmsman were held not to blame. Rotoiti when a Union ship
Mangapapa	1902	1903–1908	Wm. Ford Jnr.	164	Mangapapa after 1903 additions Collier launched by W. M. Ford at Berry's Bay on 24 September 1902 for Taranaki Collieries Ltd, 105 ft (32 m) x 25 ft (7.6 m) x 6.5 ft (2.0 m), 2-cylinder (13, 26, - 18)″. 120 psi (830 kPa) compound surface condensing engines by Vauxhall Iron Works, average speed 10 knots (19 km/h; 12 mph), schooner-rigged, of Australian hardwood and kauri, able to carry 160 tons of coal from the shallow Mōkau River, accommodation for 16 crew. Despite her design she had problems navigating the river, so Ngunguru was sold to Taranaki and Mangapapa bought from them by NSS in 1903. In 1903 her appearance was greatly changed, when NSS had passenger accommodation for 26 men and 10 women and electric lighting, added by Robert Logan. In 1908 NSS replaced her on the Whakatāne route with Tasman and sold her to Karamea Steamship Company in 1908 to replace the wrecked Ngunguru. On 20 July 1909 Mangapapa ran aground on the North Spit of the Karamea River and on 10 October 1914 she too was wrecked there, due to recent silting. Karamea Steamship Company closed after the wreck.
Maranui	1953	1953–1968	J. Bodewes, Hoogezand	739	Motor ship built for NSS, 11 knots (20 km/h; 13 mph), 189.5 ft (57.8 m) x 30.85 ft (9.40 m), draught 12.76 ft (3.89 m). She sank on 13 June 1968 25 mi (40 km) east of Mercury Island, en route from Lyttelton to Auckland, with 9 of her 15 crew drowned. An inquiry blamed shifting of her wheat cargo, lack of attention to weather forecasts and failure to close pipes.
Matangi	1908	1923–1929	A. Stephens & Sons, Linthouse	1365	Steamer built as Mourilyan for routes from Melbourne. 1923 sold to NSS and renamed Matangi for Whangārei and Tauranga services, after it had been decided a new ship was unaffordable. 1929 sold to Anchor. 1957 broken up.
Matuku		1891–1916 or later	Not known	3	Steam tugs and barge at Paeroa in 1904 Waihou River steam tug, of 3 hp (2.2 kW), which, in August 1906, was raised and repaired after being sunk by a ferry cable near Mangaiti. In 1889 she was advertised as connecting ss Ruby sailings with a Paeroa-Te Aroha link.
Maunganui	1955	1955–1971	J. Bodewes, Hoogezand	845	Motor ship launched at Hoogezand on 14 April 1955 for NSS, 209 ft (64 m) x 32 ft (9.8 m), draught 13.5 ft (4.1 m), 11 knots, very similar to Poranui. On her delivery voyage she brought cement from Antwerp and tomatoes from Rarotonga to Tauranga. February 1971 sold to Coastal Cruising Company, Rotterdam, renamed Zeehan and left for Australia. 1972 seized in Brisbane for non-payment of wages. Owners listed as Coastal Cruises Pty Ltd of Proserpine, Queensland. 1972 sold to Pacific International Lines, Singapore, renamed Kota Muila. 1994 owned and managed by Overseas Shipping Agents, Chittagong. 1996 sold to Marine & Marine Limited, Dhaka, renamed Saleem, but still serving Chittagong. 2003 engine reported as unreliable. January 2004 scrapped at Kadim Rasul, Kumira.
Melva	1946	1946	United Ship and Boatbuilders, Auckland and Steel Ships Limited.	243	Like Aranui and Rosalie, built of kauri, 500 hp (370 kW), 8 kn (15 km/h; 9.2 mph), 103 ft (31 m) x 24 ft (7.3 m) x 9.5 ft (2.9 m) built as powered lighter YF-1047, chartered by NSS for a few weeks in 1946, from 26 October to 12 November, to carry cargo to Great Barrier, Tauranga, Whangaroa and Napier, to cover during Kapiti's annual overhaul. Holm & Co took her for 2 years to carry dolomite from Onekaka to Wellington, until September 1948, when Union Manufacturing & Export Co, Petone, first chartered and then, in 1949, bought her to salvage US war material. 1949 sold to same company. Damaged off New Guinea and holed on a reef near Mackay. 1950 laid up at Wellington. 1951 Sold to Greymouth Shipping Company to run Greymouth-Wellington-Wanganui. August 1952 new twin 320 hp (240 kW) diesels installed. 1954 laid up Wellington. 1956 Sold to Captain H C Williams, Rarotonga, for local trading. 1957 Sold to Dartim Shipping Co. Hong Kong, to run between Timor and Australia. 1961 Arrived Townsville for repairs. Arrested for debt on 2 September 1966 Scuttled 50 mi (80 km) off Townsville.
Moanui	1961	1961–1966	Pacific Island Shipbuilding Company	975	Motor ship built for NSS, 211 ft (64 m) x 36 ft (11 m) x 12 ft (3.7 m), 12 knots (22 km/h; 14 mph). She was the first ship in the fleet to have bipod masts. 1966 sold to John Burke, Brisbane and renamed Alagna. 1973 sold to Cairns owners and renamed Eurika. 1975 sold to Poly Shipping Co. Ltd. Soc. Anon, Singapore and renamed Aik Lai. 1977 sold to Gill Shipping Co. (Pte) Ltd. (Heng Leong Shipping Co).1985 reported still sailing.
Moanui	1957	1967–1975	Ardrossan Dockyard Limited	1289	Motor ship launched on 10 December 1957 and delivered in June 1958, as Bay Fisher, to James Fisher & Sons Ltd, Barrow-in-Furness, who chartered her to Atlantic Steam Navigation Co. Ltd, until 1967, when NSS first chartered, then, in March 1970, bought her, renaming her Moanui. She was 220.9 ft (67.3 m) long, 38.1 ft (11.6 m) wide, 16.4 ft (5.0 m) deep, with 6-cylinder (340x570mm) British Polar Engines and a single screw. In 1975 she was sold to Crossworld Navigation Services, Singapore and renamed Chantala Fortune, in 1977 to Pacific International Lines, Singapore as Kota Pahlawan and in 1984 to Maritime Express Inc., Panama as Pahlawan. On 27 October 1984 her classification was suspended for lack of a survey and by 1986 was under arrest near Chennai Port. Feng Nan took her in tow for Singapore, but, on 11 May 1986, the tow rope snapped and she ran aground near Gravet Point, Sri Lanka, becoming a total loss. In Feb 1989 she was broken up.
Motu	1920	1920–1949	G.T. Niccol	197	Schooner built for NSS. Later became an auxiliary ketch. Whilst waiting for her engines to arrive, she was towed from Whangārei to Auckland, carrying cement, before starting on Bay of Plenty routes. The 160 hp (120 kW) twin semi diesel engines were replaced in 1938, with twin 240 hp (180 kW) Fairbanks Morse diesels. 1949 sold to Karamea Shipping Company Limited. In February 1962, while berthed at Lyttelton, she was crushed by Union's Maori and damaged beyond repair. Towed to Dunedin and dismantled there.
Muritai	1884	1897–1908	J. McArthur & Co, Paisley	225	Muritai on Muritai Point 1884 launched on 12 August 1884 as Bellinger for G.W. Nicoll, Sydney. She was 125 ft (38 m) long, 22.1 ft (6.7 m) wide x 8.7 ft (2.7 m) deep, 2-masted, iron ship, with a 45 hp (34 kW) 2-cylinder (17, 32 - 21)″ engine by William Kemp, Govan, driving a single screw at up to 9.5 kn (17.6 km/h; 10.9 mph). 1884 sold to Belfast & Koroit S.N. Co. 1887 sold to Bruce B. Nicholl of Sydney, N.S.W. 1890 sold to E.T. Miles, Hobart. On 20 April 1892 she ran into a barque, Presto, and sank, without loss of life. She was refloated on 9 May. The Marine Court suspended the Bellinger's captain for six months, finding that she was carelessly navigated and had not reduced speed when approaching the barque. In 1894 sold to T.A. Reynolds & Partners, Hobart. 1896 sold to Union. 1897 sold to NSS. 27 May 1908 wrecked with no casualties on Lady Alice Island in a fog. The second mate had his certificate suspended for 13 months, and he and the captain had to pay the costs of the enquiry. In 1972 the wreck site was named Muritai Point.
Nellie		1906 - c1921	Not known		Motor launch used for towing.
Ngapuhi	1900	1900–1941	Gourlay Brothers, Dundee	691. 703 from 1922	Ngapuhi dining saloon Steamer launched on 18 April 1900 and completed in June 1900, 190 ft (58 m) long, 30 ft (9.1 m) wide x 12.8 ft (3.9 m) deep, with two sets of 3-cylinder (13, 21, 34 - 24)″ 160 hp (120 kW) engines, driving twin screws, built for NSS to replace Gairloch on the Onehunga-New Plymouth route, which she could cover in as little as 10 hours 35 minutes. She had 5 watertight bulkheads, polished ash, oak, mahogany and walnut panels, with New Zealand scenes etched on the glass windows. On 9 November 1904 she ran down the schooner Rimu on a hazy night. An inquiry found that the second officer should have kept a better lookout, but returned his certificate. From 1904 to 1908 Ngapuhi was used each February for 8-day pleasure cruises from Auckland to Mangōnui. In 1905 so many bookings were received that a second cruise was considered. In 1909 her boiler was replaced. In August 1912 Manaia replaced Ngapuhi on the Whangārei route and she served Tauranga, replacing Aupouri. She took over the New Plymouth run from Rarawa, until she was replaced by Hauturu from 3 May 1930. After reduction of the New Plymouth service, she regularly ran in the Hauraki Gulf, until converted to a hulk in 1930. In 1941 the Navy planned to use her as a mine-sweeper, but on 3 November 1944, the iron hull was beached in Boulder Bay, where her stern remained in 2014.
Ngatiawa	1906	1906–1934	D.J. Dunlop & Co., Port Glasgow	451	Ngatiawa aground in 1920 Steamer built for NSS as a sister ship of Aupouri, both able to carry 500 tons of cargo capacity, but only draw 5.75 ft (1.75 m) and planned to be 152 ft (46 m) long, 27 ft (8.2 m) wide and 10.25 ft (3.12 m) deep, though actually 152.5 ft (46.5 m) long, 27.1 ft (8.3 m) wide, 10 ft (3.0 m) deep, 55 hp (41 kW). Launched on 23 May 1906, she was a passenger/cargo, steel ship, with twin-screws, driven by two 3-cylinder (8.5, 14 & 23.5 - 15)″ engines. From 18 February to 7 March 1920 she was stuck on the west side of Ōpōtiki bar. She started a new twice weekly service to Port Waikato in March 1926, then ran on several other routes. She hit a pier at Whitianga on 18 January 1928 and her last trip was probably from Great Barrier a week later. She was laid up in Shoal Bay, then sold for scrap in August 1934. A pump has been preserved at the Maritime Museum in Auckland.
Ngunguru	1893	1896–1903	Wm. Holmes, Devonport	105	Ngunguru at Whakatāne in 1899 Steamer of wood, 91.2 ft (27.8 m) long, 17 ft (5.2 m) wide, 6.7 ft (2.0 m) deep, 24 hp (18 kW), built to serve Ngunguru Colliery for T.H. Barwell & Partners, Auckland, 1895 sold to William Mitchell, Auckland and in 1896 to NSS. In July 1903 NSS sold Ngunguru to Taranaki Collieries Limited, Sydney for their Mōkau coal trade and bought Mangapapa from them. In 1904 Ngunguru was sold to S.G. Hayward & H.M. Field, Nelson, in 1905 to H.L. Nathan, Wellington, in 1906 to Blenheim Steam Ship Company Ltd and in 1907 to Karamea Steam Ship Company Ltd, Wellington. In September 1908 she was wrecked on Karamea River bar. Her engines and her cargo of timber were salvaged. She was replaced by the NSS ship for which she'd been exchanged in 1903, Mangapapa.
Nikau	1909	1955–1956	Mackie & Thomson, Govan	248	Motor ship, built as a steamship for Anchor and converted to a motor ship in 1935. In 1954 she was sold to Kiwi Shipping Co., Auckland and in 1955 to NSS. She was launched on 6 April 1909, had twin-screws and was 120.2 ft (36.6 m) long, 22.1 ft (6.7 m) wide and 7.3 ft (2.2 m) deep. She had several accidents. On 26 November 1917 her propeller was damaged in Blind Bay, as it had been in French Pass on 25 June 1917, where she ran aground on 5 February 1931. On 18 March 1921 she was damaged in Cook Strait, on 16 November 1937 stranded in Queen Charlotte Sound and again at Motueka on 4 May 1938, shortly after her 9 April 1938 collision with Rangitoa at Nelson. She had a broken shaft off Westport on 6 February 1943. On 21 November 1944 she was aground off Cape Campbell. She was laid up in May 1931, until, in 1935, her passenger accommodation was removed and her steam engine was replaced by two 150 hp (110 kW) British Polar diesels, though an official test report refers to British Auxiliaries Ltd type M35E. Her diesel funnel was much shorter than her original one. In 1954 she was chartered to NSS and bought in July 1955 to work Tauranga and Whakatāne routes, before being sold to Burns Philp (South Sea) Co. Ltd in July 1956. On 5 December 1964 she was wrecked at Loasia Point, on Tanna Island's east coast, when being chartered by Athol Rusden.
Ohinemuri	1891	1891–1904	Wm. Holmes, North Shore	114	SS Ohinemuri working as a tug Steamer Ohinemuri was built of wood, 89.1 ft (27.2 m) long, 18.4 ft (5.6 m) wide x 6.9 ft (2.1 m) deep, 30 hp (22 kW), built for NSS's Paeroa service to replace Te Aroha. She was launched on 8 September 1891, rigged as a ketch, with 30 berths and a ladies' cabin. G. Fraser and Sons built the compound, surface-condensing engines, with 12″ and 24″ cylinders of 15″ stroke, fed by a tubular boiler at 100 psi (690 kPa) working pressure. She was used as a tug between Kaipara and Onehunga, and Whangapē, often with the former 1865 barquentine Sarah and Mary, after she was damaged in 1904. In 1904 Ohinemuri was sold to Mitchelson Timber Company, then to John Harrison, Aratapu, in 1908 back to Mitchelson, in 1912 to Whangape Timber Company and in 1928 to W.G. Lovell, Napier, where she was submerged and derelict after 1945.
Omana	1913	1922–1939	G.T. Niccol	83	Omana at Auckland Steamer launched on 31 December 1913 by G.T. Niccol, for his Dargaville to Tangiteroria service, with space for 200 passengers, wooden hull, Ross & Duncan triple expansion engine, of 14 hp (10 kW), 77.4 ft (23.6 m) long, 16.1 ft (4.9 m) wide 7.4 ft (2.3 m) deep. In 1922 she was sold to NSS to replace Waiuku to Waiheke, Browns Bay, Silverdale (until April 1930, when the service ended due to road improvements), Mahurangi and Matakana. On 15 October 1926 she got stuck on a reef at Tiritiri Matangi in fog. Clansman towed her off. In 1930 In 1937 Omana was withdrawn, her engine put in a new Bluff trawler, Torea, in 1940, and the hull beached at Ngataringa Bay.
Onehunga	1948	1962–1968	Uddevallavarvet Aktiebolaget, Uddevalla	914	Motor ship built as Dragon for Rederi A/B Drabant (L. Ringborg Mgr) (Swedish). 1960 renamed Tullan. Owned by Partredereit for M.S. Tullan (Lars Johansson Mgrs). 1962 sold to Kaipara S.S. Co. Ltd. (she was their last vessel). Managed by NSS, who crewed her for the delivery voyage from Fowey, via Tasmania. 1965 sold to Fletcher Industries Limited. Managed by NSS. 1968 June sold to Reef Shipping Company Ltd, Fiji. 1968 October renamed Jean Philippe. 1973 sold to Keenan Shipping (Pte) Ltd, Singapore and renamed Tropic Winds. 1974 sold to Southwind Shipping Company (Pte). 1976 sold to Majulah Nav. Snd. Bhd. (Malaysian). Renamed Tat Lee. 16 November 1979 Lloyd's Class withdrawn at owners request.
Orewa	1898	1908–1925	Charles & W. Bailey, Auckland	55	Orewa Steamer launched on 20 August 1898 for A. McGregor, Auckland, though the ship fell through the slipway and had to wait for high tide to complete the launch. She was built of kauri, 70 ft (21 m) x 16.5 ft (5.0 m) x 7 ft (2.1 m), replaced Maori on the Auckland-Wade-Matakana route. 1900 sold to W.A. McGregor, 1905 sold to SSC. Joined NSS on the merger with SSC on 1 October 1908. 1925 sold to G.A. Wood, Hokitika. 1939 sold to H.A. Wood, Hokitika. 1941 sold to H.J. and N.H. Roderique, Bluff, mainly for an oyster trawler. 1947 H.J. became sole owner. May have become a storage hulk at Bluff.
Otimai	1921	1921–1952	G.T. Niccol, Freeman's Bay	207	Otimai Auxiliary schooner, with kauri hull, twin 80 hp (60 kW) Beardmore engines and a shallow draught for the east coast rivers, 105 ft (32 m) long, 25 ft (7.6 m) wide 7.5 ft (2.3 m) deep, built for NSS. The engines were replaced in 1938 with twin 240 hp (180 kW) Fairbanks Morse diesels. 1948 laid up. 1952 used as a barge to unload Moldova at Auckland. 1958 hull sold to McKendrick Industries Limited, Auckland and broken up. Hull beached on Moturekareka Island, inside Rewa.
Paeroa	1891	1892–1917	Charles Bailey, Auckland	91	Paeroa at Whangamumu in 1901 From about 1890 H. Adams, of Thames ran a barge and launch between Paeroa and Te Aroha (previously abandoned when the railway opened to Te Aroha), moving cargo brought from Auckland by ss Ruby and NSS's Paeroa-Thames boats. Gold, timber, flour and condensed milk traffics were all increasing. Hauraki Steamship Co., built Paeroa and in opposition to her NSS, which was trading between Auckland and Thames with Rotomahana and Enterprise and between Paeroa and Thames with the Patiki, built Ohinemuri to run direct between Wharf Street, Paeroa and Auckland. The fight continued for about 8 months. Steamer built for Hauraki Steam Ship Company (HSSC) to run between Paeroa and Auckland, from 19 October 1891. On 19 November NSS put the Ohinemuri on, though a report said Ohinemuri was 15 minutes slower to Turua than the Paeroa. Competition reached the stage of an already reduced return fare of 6s. being reduced, firstly to 2s. and later to a shilling, for the trip of almost 70 mi (110 km) each way from Kopu to Auckland. Competition ended in June 1892, when HSSC sold Paeroa to NSS and agreed not to compete on the Waihou River. Paeroa was repainted in NSS colours on 16 June 1892 and began serving Paeroa twice a week for NSS. From April 1896 she, Waimarie and Ohinemuri provided a service most days. By then the return fare had risen to 15s. She was replaced by Taniwha in 1898. Paeroa on Hokitika beach in 1920 Paeroa was then used on several other routes, including Marsden Point, Ōhiwa, Whakaari / White Island and Tauranga Whangamumu, Cabbage Bay (Colville), Mangōnui, Awanui and Waiharara, Whangaruru, Helena Bay, Tutukaka and Whananaki and Whangapoua and Port Charles. In October 1917 she was sold to Hokitika Shipping Company Limited for £1,000. She had 15 berths in her main saloon and 6 in a ladies cabin, was built of kauri and 87.1 ft (26.5 m) long, 16.2 ft (4.9 m) wide, 6.1 ft (1.9 m) deep, with a 25 hp (19 kW) A & G Price compound engine. From 1917 she ran to west coast ports and Wellington and also ran multi-day excursions with 20 passengers to Milford Sound and other fiords. On 23 July 1920 she lost her sternpost and rudder on the Hokitika Bar and was beached just to the north. At high tide she was buffeted by the waves. The shipping company bought the wreck from the underwriters for £105, hoping to recover the engines.
Paroto	1914	1914–1948	G.T. Niccol	109	Paroto washed ashore in a storm Auxiliary scow, ketch, or schooner, launched for NSS, with twin 60 hp (45 kW) Beardmore engines and a shallow draught for the Ōhiwa, Whakatāne and Ōpōtiki bars, 87.3 ft (26.6 m) long, 23.3 ft (7.1 m) wide 6.8 ft (2.1 m) deep. Due to wartime delays, she wasn't completed until 1915. On 7 August 1929 her anchor cable broke in a storm and she was blown onto the beach at Whakaari-White Island. She was towed to Auckland for repairs. July 1948 sold to Richardson & Company, Napier, insulated and re-engined. 1949 sold to Collingwood Shipping Company, Nelson, which was bought by Inter-Island Shipping Company in 1950 and converted to a pure motorship, with a short funnel and only one mast. In 1956 she carried scrapped rails from Wellington tramways to load aboard Matangi and Totara at Whakatahuri (in Forsyth Bay, south of Bird Island). In 1958 she was first to call at the reopened port of Kaiapoi. In 1960 ownership transferred to Inter Island Shipping Company. In 1961 she was again rebuilt and re-engined. On 3 August 1966 she ran aground in fog at Point Gibson, south of Gore Bay, and was sold for scrap, though the breakers had problems. A storm in 1968 broke the remains in two and, in 1978, they wrecked slipways at Port Robinson during a storm.
Patiki	1881	1893–1901	A & G Price	59	P.S. Patiki at Paeroa Paddle steamer with a 15 hp (11 kW), non condensing engine, built for Thames River Steam Navigation Co. Ltd. (formed in 1882, when Te Aroha was also bought), costing £2,220. The company sold to NSS on 1 August 1893, when she had a comprehensive overhaul by A & G Price. In October 1901 Taniwha sank Patiki at night on a bend of the river; the company's give way rules were found to be confusing. Patiki was then converted to an unpowered barge.
Pioneer	1896	1896 - post 1940	Logan Brothers		Tender, built for NSS to service hulks on Auckland Harbour. 1940 last reported date.
Pono	1913	1913–1947	G.T. Niccol	56	Pono at Auckland in 1946 Auxiliary schooner launched in December 1913 for NSS, 60 hp (45 kW), 1 screw, 7 knots (13 km/h; 8.1 mph) 67.4 ft (20.5 m) x 19.7 ft (6.0 m) x 5.9 ft (1.8 m). On 13 November 1926 she ran aground at Kirita Bay, near Manaia. On 30 March 1947 she was the last ship to serve Thames and Ngatea. She was then laid up for sale. 1948 sold to H.K.H. Anderson, Auckland and dismantled.
Poranui	1956	1956–1969	J. Bodewes, Hoogezand	892	Motor ship launched on 14 July 1956 for NSS. She was delivered via Panama, rather than Suez, because of the conflict there. She also visited England, Genoa and Sfax, before averaging 10.7 knots (19.8 km/h; 12.3 mph) across the Pacific, to arrive in Whangarei on 4 January 1957. She was 209 ft (64 m) x 32 ft (9.8 m). In October 1969 she was sold to A.R. Rusden for almost $100,000, but a month later, on 17 November, she was wrecked without loss of life on Jouan Reef, though attempts to save her continued until February.
Pukeko		1890?–1910	Not known		Pukeko may have been an unofficial name for a new launch at Whakatāne in 1907.
Ranginui	1936	1937–1957	Scott & Sons, Bowling	158	Steel motor coaster, launched on 9 April 1936 for G.T. Niccol, 106.7 ft (32.5 m) x 22.1 ft (6.7 m) x 6 ft (1.8 m), 2 x 133 hp (99 kW) 2S.C.SA, 5 cylinder engines by Fairbanks Morse, 2 screws, driving her at up to 9 knots (17 km/h; 10 mph). on 22 February 1937 she was sold to NSS to serve Whangārei-Auckland-Tauranga, November 1957 to Collingwood Shipping Co for Wellington–Lyttelton trips and, in November 1958, with Paroto, Kaiapoi-Wellington. In May and September 1960 she stuck on Kaiapoi bar. In November 1967 she began with her final owner, Tim Wallace, of Luggate Game Packers, Wānaka, with a helipad added for venison export from Fiordland. She was laid up at Port Chalmers in 1968 and returned to Kaiapoi. In August 1972 Caribbean Pacific Enterprise planned to convert her to a frigate, but didn't leave Kaiapoi untilold to Alpine Helicopters in 1976, when she returned to Fiordland, had a refit at Bluff in 1986 and later provided recreational accommodation for the Wallace family. On 8 May 1995 she sank in 50 m (160 ft) at an unattended Te Puaitaha / Breaksea Sound mooring, where she was photographed in 2008.
Rangitoto	1913	1926–1940	Murdoch & Murray, Port Glasgow	585	Rangitoto Steamer launched on 23 July 1913 for the Amazon River, but became HMS Ant, a Naval Auxiliary Tender at Southampton, 164.5 ft (50.1 m) long, 33.1 ft (10.1 m) wide, 8.3 ft (2.5 m) deep, single screw, 100 hp (75 kW), 3-cylinder (15, 25 & 40 - 24)″ engine by Muir & Houston Ltd, Glasgow, driving her at 12 kn (22 km/h; 14 mph). 1924 brought to Auckland via Suez for excursion work by George Turnbull Niccol and renamed Rangitoto. 1925 sold to NSS. 1937 laid up as the bottom plates had worn thin. 1940 taken over by N.Z.Navy as a Battery Ship. In 1941, or 1942, she was beached at Ngataringa Bay. Engine and boiler removed for use in minesweeper Manuka. In 1965 Rangitoto was used in demolition exercises and in 1968 broken up.
Rarawa	1903	1903–1940	Gourlay Brothers, Dundee	1072	Rarawa Steamer built of Siemen's Martin steel, launched on 30 April 1903 and delivered via Port Said, Colombo, and Fremantle to Auckland, where she was cleaned and repainted, before going on to Onehunga, via Whangārei, Russell and Hokianga, first visiting New Plymouth on 19 October 1903. She was rigged as a schooner for NSS's Onehunga-New Plymouth route, 210 ft (64 m) long, 31 ft (9.4 m) wide, 14 ft (4.3 m) deep, with 5 watertight bulkheads, water ballast tanks fore and aft for trimming, bilge keels to minimise rolling, berths for 142 first and 48 second-class passengers, polished oak, mahogany, sycamore, teak and walnut panels, stained glass windows and steel masts for lifting heavy loads. She had two sets of triple expansion, 3-cylinder (14, 23, 37 - 24)″, surface condensing engines, fed by two boilers, fired by six corrugated furnaces to drive her at 13.5 kn (25.0 km/h; 15.5 mph). She was an enlarged and improved version of Ngapuhi. In 1929 she was laid up in Shoal Bay, until it was decided to scrap her in 1937. In 1941 engines and internal fittings were removed and installed in the mine-sweepers Rimu and Hinau by Senior Foundry and Shipbuilders Ltd. Rarawa was stripped, filled with concrete and beached west of Boulder Bay in March 1941, or on 24 December 1940.
Ratanui	1946	1952–1956	George T. Davie & Sons, Ottawa	515	Motor ship built as Ottawa Mayspring for Canadian Government, under control of General Timber Products of Quebec. Completed as Mayspring. 1948 sold to Danish owners Arrenak I/S (S.A. Thomasen managers) and named Arrenak. 1952 sold to NSS and renamed Ratanui. She had 2 masts and her engines were aft. In 1952 Hauturu was too small for the Lyttelton route, so Ratanui replaced her, On 30 November 1956 Ratanui left for Suva after sale to Burns Philp (South Sea) Co. Ltd, who had bought Nikau in July 1956. In she was 1970 sold to Rusden & Sofrana (Fiji) Ltd, Suva. She may have been broken up at Madang in 1971, though in January that year she was advertised for sale at Madang, "as is, where is" and in 1977 an advert invited tenders for removal of the wreck of Ratanui, lying in about 30 ft (9.1 m) of water on the eastern shore of Binnen Harbor at Madang.
Rimu	1898	1908–1932	Allsup & Co., Preston	412	Rimu Steamer launched on 14 October 1898 for Keith Ramsey, A. D. Campbell, J. Mill and Captain Sundstrum, Dunedin, to carry up to 45 passengers along the south coast. 142.6 ft (43.5 m) long, 24 ft (7.3 m) wide, 9.6 ft (2.9 m) deep, with 95 hp (71 kW) twin triple expansion (10.25, 16, 28 x 22)″, driving twin screws at up to 11 kn (20 km/h; 13 mph). She left Preston on 14 December and arrived at Port Chalmers on 25 February 1899 via Holyhead, Malta, Port Said, Aden, Colombo and Albany. In 1907 she was chartered by Union to run the Hobart-Strahan-Melbourne route after an accident. In April 1908 Invercargill Shipping Co. Ltd, Dunedin sold Rimu to NSS. In 1914, to meet demand for improved passenger accommodation between Onehunga, Raglan, Kawhia and Hokianga, electric light and 26 two-berth cabins were added, providing for 54 saloon passengers Rimu took over the route from Claymore. In 1923 she grounded on a mudbank in Manukau Harbour, on her way from Raglan and Kawhia. She also served Hokianga, but could be delayed over a week by storms. On her last overhaul, there was concern about her hull and her engine and her final trip was on 22 December 1926, when she left Kawhia and Raglan for Onehunga, Hokianga and Auckland, arriving there on 26 December, to be laid up. 1932 dismantled at Auckland and, on 10 November 1932, her hull was beached on Rotoroa Island.
Ronaki	1922	1929–1943	G.T.Niccol	255	Ronaki Auxiliary schooner, 112 ft (34 m) x 27 ft (8.2 m) x 8.5 ft (2.6 m), 2 x 135 hp (101 kW) Bolinder engines, using crude oil, 9 knots (17 km/h; 10 mph), 350 tons cargo, 10 crew, built for Wilson Portland Cement Company, 1929 sold to NSS to end passenger services to Tauranga and replace Ngapuhi. In 1930 she was replaced by Waka and took over services from Onehunga to Hokianga (until 1941), Port Waikato, Raglan and Kawhia. In 1941, en route from Kawhia to South Island, an engine failed and she used a sail to reach New Plymouth, but was described as "not built for sailing". 1943 sold to government and used as a US Navy storeship. 18 June 1943 wrecked Norfolk Island.
Rosalie	1945	1946	Shipbuilders Limited and Seagar Brothers Limited.	239	Motor ship built in Auckland for New Zealand Marine Department named YF-1048, renamed Rosalie.15 May 1946 to 15 Nov 1946 chartered by NSS to replace Clansman on the Onehunga-Picton route. 15 May 1946 cargo fertilizer to Whangārei and cement on return. 17 May 1946 towed barge to Tauranga. 22 May 1946 relieved Hauturu on Onehunga-Raglan-Kawhia run. 31 May 1946 Auckland to Picton. 14 June 1946 Onehunga from Picton (salt and general) via New Plymouth (wool). 2 July 1946 to Kawhia, New Plymouth and Whanganui. August 1947 sold to Union Manufacturing & Export to run to Norfolk Island and New Caledonia, April 1958 sold to A. Mouledous and Societe Liemann Mouledous, March 1961 to Capt. E Savoie and renamed Sorana del Mar. May 1961 to Captain A R Rusden, Port Vila. July 1962 stranded on mudbank in Vanuatu. Refloated by Nikau. 14 July 1964, off Espiritu Santo, burnt to the waterline due to petroleum drums.
Rose Ann	1875	1892-1896	Matthew Sims, Onehunga		A cutter named Rose Ann was at Onehunga in 1875 and was said to have been built by Sims a few months earlier. In 1885 Rose Ann was sold to A D Bennett and to NSS in July 1892 as a tender to Glenelg at Raglan, to collect cargo from harbour landings. She made several trips to Waingaro landing for wool. In 1893 she struck a reef at Waingaro and was repaired at Raglan and Onehunga. In August 1896 she was returned to Onehunga, advertised for sale in November by Sims, Onehunga and available for hire there in December. In 1898 she moved to Waitara and in June 1899 was wrecked at Awakino.
Rothesay	1904	1907 - c1925	Seagar Bros, Auckland	17	Steamer 52 ft (16 m) long, 11 ft (3.4 m) wide, 4 ft (1.2 m) deep, built for Stewart & Williams and used on Tauranga-Katikati service. Bought by NSS in 1907 and used until at least 1925.
Rotokohu	1901	1903–1939	Savage, Ōpōtiki	15	Rotokohu Waihou River steam launch Rotokohu was built as Clematis, with a hull of kauri and engines by A & G Price. In July 1907, due to increased custom, NSS put her on the Paeroa-Te Aroha route as Rotokohu, a larger, 30 passenger, steamer. The trip up the Waihou River from Paeroa took 6 1/2 hours, rather than 10 hours by Matuku. She was able to tow 80 tons of cargo in a barge. In 1938 it was decided she was a tug, rather than a launch, entitling her crew to an extra 10s a week. In January 1939 she was offered for sale and sold for £80 to Harold Fogden of Auckland.
Rotomahana	1876	1890–1917	Fraser & Tinne	183	Steamer sold to NSS in 1890 for the Thames run. 1896 Transferred to the Coromandel run. 1917 broken up at Auckland and sold to McCallum Bros, who sank her to form a wharf at Pakihi Island.
Rowena	1872	1881–1890	H. Niccol, Devonport	108	Rowena Steamer Rowena was launched on 24 August 1872, though she came to a halt about half way down the slip and had to wait for the next tide. She had a 30 hp (22 kW) compound engine, was 101.6 ft (31.0 m) long, 17.1 ft (5.2 m) wide x 6.6 ft (2.0 m) deep and, in 1872, registered in Auckland by D B Cruikshank. She was built for D.A. Cruikshank, James S. Macfarlane, W.A. McGregor and partner of Auckland and, in 1881, she was among the first in the NSS fleet. 1890 sold to J.H. Ross, 1891 to J. McClelland, 1894 to H. Hayes, 1895 to C.T. Roberts, 1895 to J.H. Williams, 1900 to Wellington Steam Ferry Co. Ltd, 1902 to Westport Coal Co. Ltd. 1906 broken up at Timaru.
Seaway Princess	1967	1967–1969	Hong Kong and Whampoa Dock Company	1106	Motor ship for the new NSS ro-ro service (mentioned above), launched on 19 September 1967. She was 81.22 m (266.5 ft) long, 13.1 m (43 ft) wide, 8.38 m (27.5 ft) deep, with 1,680 hp (1,250 kW) British Polar engines, driving a single screw at up to 13.5 kn (25.0 km/h; 15.5 mph). She arrived at Auckland in January 1968 and could carry 68 cargon pallets of 16 to 28 tons. Her first voyage was delayed about a week by a dispute over staffing of the Fergusson Wharf linkspan at Auckland and it wasn't until February 1968 that she had a suitable terminal at Lyttelton. In March she was laid up for 6 weeks for engine repairs. On 22 December 1969 she was sold to Holm & Co and renamed Holmlea on 13 April 1970, but negotiations delayed a Lyttelton-Wellington service on charter to Union until 5 June 1970. In February 1975 she was sold to a shipping company at Messina, renamed Annarita Seconda and left Wellington on 8 March. In 1978 she was renamed Gabbiano and in 1983 sold to a Genoan company. On 2 November 1989 shipbreakers Eurofer SpA started work on her at San Giorgio di Nogaro.
Senator	1848	Not known - 1906	William Hoile Brown, Auckland	1012	Coal hulk
Staffa	1876	1881–1897	Thomas Niccol, Devonport	80	Staffa and Captain Baker - drowned 1883 Steamer 75 ft (23 m) x 16 ft (4.9 m) x 8 ft (2.4 m), built for A. McGregor and passed to NSS on its formation in 1881. A Fraser & Tinne, 70 psi (480 kPa), 20 in (510 mm) single cylinder engine drove her at up to 9 kn (17 km/h; 10 mph) on her trial trip on 30 March . From April 1876 she served the Bay of Plenty, as a feeder from Ōpōtiki to Rowena's Tauranga-Auckland route. She had trouble with Ōpōtiki bar, being stuck on it in January 1883. On 6 February 1883, her captain was drowned whilst checking the depth of the bar in a small boat. The delays resulted in complaints. In 1897 Staffa was working to Mongōnui and ports to the north, as a feeder from Russell. NSS was seeking a cheaper replacement, Staffa was broken up at Auckland in 1897.
Tahawai	1905	1905 - c1924	Hare Bros, Kaeo	12	Motor launch built for NSS, as a feeder to collect kauri gum and take supplies to the Karikari Peninsula, Kaimaumau, Waipapakauri, Waiharara and Awanui. In August 1921 lightning made holes in her and she was beached at the fish factory on the Awanui River. She was still running in 1923.
Tainui	1945	1949–1963	Kalmar Varv, Kalmar	539	Motor ship built as Vestria for O.M. Thore, Jonstorp and sold to NSS in 1949 to service Lyttelton, Picton, New Plymouth and Raglan, she was 175 ft (53 m) long, 23.5 ft (7.2 m) wide, with a speed of 10.5 kn (19.4 km/h; 12.1 mph). She took 4 months to travel from Europe to Whangārei. In 1963 she was sold to Mr Suh Lee Kom of the Mayfair Rubber Co, Singapore, in December 1962 to Moh Yin Quek (Panama), July 1963 to Chagres Co. Panama Soc. Anon, 1965 renamed Dragon Dorado, 1970 to Eastern Shg. and Trading Co. (Pte.) Ltd. and renamed Ares (Singapore) and 1978 to Yodpatankarn Co. Ltd. (Thai). IMO: 5349346 may still be in use.
Tainui II	1963	1973–1976	Astano SA, El Ferrol	1.562	Tainui II as Ferdinand Retzlaff Motor ship built for Sameiet Seagull A/S, Oslo as Seagull, 259.7 ft (79.2 m) long, 39.6 ft (12.1 m) wide, 16.8 ft (5.1 m) deep, with 1,699 hp (1,267 kW) M.A.N. engines driving her at up to 11 kn (20 km/h; 13 mph). 1964 sold to Dr Erich Retzlaff, Bremen, renamed Ferdinand Retzlaff. 1970 sold to Angbats A/B Kalmarsund and renamed Kalmarland. 1973 sold to NSS. Renamed Tainui II. In November 1974 she was laid up Auckland. She was the last NSS ship when she left Auckland on 24 May 1976, after sale to Ayo Shipping Company, Florida, who renamed her Koral. On 5 November 1979 she sank after hitting mooring dolphins, about 200 miles west of Dry Tortugas, between Dominican Republic and New Orleans with a cargo of sugar.
Taniwha	1898	1898–1939	Robert Logan Sr., Auckland	263	Taniwha at Paeroa in 1912 Steamer Taniwha was a slightly larger sister of Waimarie, both built for NSS, mainly for the Paeroa service, which she joined from 4 April 1898, serving Karangahake, Waitekauri, and Waihi, with Waimarie and other ships. She was wooden, with twin-screws, lit by electricity, 108.9 ft (33.2 m) long, 23.8 ft (7.3 m) wide, 6.3 ft (1.9 m) deep, with 40 hp (30 kW) engines. Her engines and boiler, built by A&G Price, were insulated from the rest of the ship by patent blue asbestos blankets. She could reach 11 kn (20 km/h; 13 mph), driven by two sets of direct-acting compound vertical surface-condensing engines (11.5, 23, 16)″, fed by a cylindrical multi-tubular marine boiler, 10.5 ft (3.2 m) in diameter and 9.5 ft (2.9 m) long, with a working pressure of 110 psi (760 kPa). In October 1901 she sank Patiki at night on a bend of the Waihou River; the company's give way rules were found to be confusing. On 11 August 1912 and 30 September 1930 she struck snags and sank in the Waihou River. However, she continued running to Te Aroha until 1937, when she was replaced by a scow. She was then used on trips to Hauraki Gulf islands, until April 1938, when her last trip was to Waiheke. Whilst laid up in Shoal Bay, on 30 October 1938, she was found to be leaking and was beached at Freemans Bay, where iron was dumped in the harbour and more valuable metals sold. In November 1939 she was broken up at Sulphur Beach.
Tasman	1903	1908–1921	Robert Logan Sr., Auckland	179	Tasman at Auckland Steamer built as the Whangarona for James Cross Burford, to run between Motueka, Nelson and Wellington, but that name was "found unsuitable" and she was renamed Tasman whilst being fitted out. She was 102 ft (31 m) long, 21 ft (6.4 m) wide, 7 ft (2.1 m) deep, with electric lights and a hull of 3 diagonal layers of kauri and iron. George Fraser & Sons' 280 hp (210 kW) compound (8 1/2, 22 1/2 - 12)″ engines were 160 psi (1,100 kPa), at 260 rpm, driving twin screws. The boiler was 9.6 ft diameter and length, with 2 Fox corrugated furnaces. On her delivery voyage from Auckland she steamed at 8.5 kn (15.7 km/h; 9.8 mph). Due to ill health she was sold to Anchor on 28 January 1907. NSS needed a larger ship to replace Mangapapa on the Whakatāne route, so bought Tasman on 15 August 1908. On 12 May 1921 she was wrecked on Rurima Reef, without loss of life. The captain and chief officer were found negligent in checking the ship's position, but they did not lose their certificates.
Tawanui	1959	1959–1973	J. Bodewes, Hoogezand	891	Tawanui in 1967 Motor ship built for NSS as a sister of Poranui, with a crew of 11 and speed of 11 kn (20 km/h; 13 mph). She was 209 ft (64 m) long. On her delivery voyage she collided with a Suez Canal tug. 1973 replaced by the larger Tainui II and sold to Tung Ho Co (Pte) Ltd, Singapore and renamed Tung Ho I and was still working in 1985.
Te Aroha	1876	1890–1891	Wm. Holmes, North Shore	51	Te Aroha in 1907 Paddle steamer, 89.2 ft (27.2 m) long, 15 ft (4.6 m) wide, 4.9 ft (1.5 m) deep, 14 hp (10 kW), built of wood, for J. Holmes, Auckland, who sold a part share to W. Souter in 1877, to Auckland & North Shore Ferry Co. Ltd. in 1877, to A. Hume, Thames in 1881 and to Thames River Steam Navigation Co. Ltd., Thames in 1884. NSS bought the company on 1 August 1890. In 1891Te Aroha was found to be too small and was replaced by Ohinemuri. In 1891 and 1892 she was run to Waiheke, firstly by E.R. Thomson, Auckland, and then by Bradney & Binns, "for some months". In January 1893 J.C. Bindon, of Te Horeke, won a £300 per annum Government mail-carrying contract for a steam launch (Te Aroha) on Hokianga harbour. She was sold to Devonport Steam Ferry Company Limited in 1896 and to T.E. Hallett, Auckland in 1907. On 1 April 1907 she leaked and sank off Peach Cove, Bream Head on her way to Waikato. The crew took to the lifeboat. She had no certificate for the open sea.
Te Teko	1914	1914–1920	G.T. Niccol	109	Auxiliary ketch, or scow, built for NSS in January 1914, 80.5 ft (24.5 m) x 22.5 ft (6.9 m) x 6.25 ft (1.91 m), with 2 x 60 hp (45 kW) semi-Diesel engines, using crude oil. Able to carry 150 tons, to trade to Whakatāne and Ōpōtiki. 6 August 1920 wrecked with loss of one crew member on Slipper Island (Whakahau), due to a strong set.
Terranora	1878	1898–1914	D. & W. Henderson, Meadowside	350	Terranora leaving Auckland Paddle steamer launched on 20 August 1878, completed in September 1878, delivered via Suez and registered for Colonial Sugar Refining Co, Sydney on 4 February 1879. She was built of mild steel, 141.5 ft (43.1 m) x 27.1 ft (8.3 m) x 10.4 ft (3.2 m), with a 2-cylinder (30, 54)″, 94 hp (70 kW) engine, driving her at 9 kn (17 km/h; 10 mph). In 1890 shares in Terranora were sold to Margaret Gallagher and Rev. Andrew Cassidy, Auckland, and, after Mrs Gallagher was murdered by her husband, in 1891 to T. Bayly, Waitara. In 1892 the Government bought her for cable laying, but she was replaced by Tutanekai in 1896, when Terranora was sold to Captain F. Black, Wellington and she was fitted with electric lights to work the Auckland-Thames route. In 1898 she was sold to E.G.R. Ford, Auckland. She competed briefly on NSS routes, before being bought by NSS in August 1898. In 1906 she was converted to a coal hulk at Auckland and on 23 May 1914 scuttled in Hauraki Gulf.
Toa	1928	1928–1961	G.T. Niccol, Freemans Bay	208	Motor ship launched January 1928 for NSS. She was 106 ft (32 m) x 26 ft (7.9 m) x 8.5 ft (2.6 m), with a twin screw, twin Bolinder engines and built of wood, which was damaged when she ran aground on Whakatāne bar in 1932, 1939 and 1950; she also had to wait 4 days off the bar in 1946. 1961 sold to Kaiapoi Shipping Company Limited to serve Kaiapoi and Wellington until laid up in 1963. She was converted for line fishing off Chatham Islands in 1964. In 1967 she worked with Ranginui in the venison recovery operations in Fiordland. She went fishing at Tonga in the early 1970s, and was laid up at Auckland in 1973. In 1974 she was auctioned by Auckland Harbour Board to recover unpaid charges, sold to Mahmoud Raza, Suva for $6,040 and renamed Paerimu. She sank at her Bay of Islands moorings in 1981.
Torea	1912	1912 - c1935	G.T. Niccol	50	Wooden, auxiliary scow, 69 ft (21 m) x 19.7 ft (6.0 m) x 5.4 ft (1.6 m), 30 hp (22 kW), 2 screw, launched on 19 June 1912 for NSS to link Te Puke with Tauranga, in place of Victory, and in 1913, to Paeroa and Tauranga. In 1927 she was running alternate weeks from Tauranga to the Rangitaiki and Kaituna rivers. In the 1930s she was laid up in Little Shoal Bay, where she broke her mooring in 1935 and drifted undamaged onto Stanley Point. She was towed back to her mooring by a small Auckland Launch & Towboat Co. launch. In 1936 she was towed to Paeroa. Later she was sold to Island buyers.
Tuhoe	1919	1919–1942 1945 - 1961	G.T. Niccol	186	Tuhoe about 1943 Auxiliary schooner with twin screws, launched on 7 April 1919 for NSS's Northland and Coromandel routes. Her twin 60 hp (45 kW) Beardmore engines, salvaged from Eunice (wrecked at Whanganui on 26 September 1917), drove her at up to 8.5 kn (15.7 km/h; 9.8 mph). She was wooden, 97.8 ft (29.8 m) x 24.7 ft (7.5 m) x 6.5 ft (2.0 m). Her maiden voyage was on 1 May 1919 from Auckland to Whakatāne and Tauranga. In 1934 she ran aground at Ōhiwa and in 1937 she lost a propeller when she hit a snag in the Waihou River. She had new engines in 1938. On 25 October 1942 Lend Lease transferred Tuhoe (S-132) to the US Army Small Ships Section to operate around New Guinea, until sold back to NSS in 1945. Chrysler truck motors replaced her original engines, before near-new diesels were found in 1944. An engine failed in December 1945, as she was returning to east coast trading. On 31 March 1947 she was the last ship to serve Paeroa. In 1947 it was reported that her 2 × 200 hp (150 kW) engines had been put in a Fairmile. Between 1956 and 1960 she was laid up three times. In August 1961 she was sold to T Eckford and Co, Blenheim, but laid up in Ōpaoa River until sale to Kaiapoi Shipping Company, in February 1962. She started trading between Kaiapoi, Wellington and Napier in April 1962. In June 1963 she stranded on the Waimakariri River bar but was refloated on 1 July. The new railway ferries ended the trade in November 1963. She was converted to a line fishing vessel but declared unseaworthy and laid up at Kaiapoi. In October 1980 Cure Boating Club Inc. bought her as a clubroom. In 1982, the MV Tuhoe Preservation Society leased her from the club and began restoration for weekend river cruises. In 2000, the hull was replaced in Lyttelton. In late 2003, she was bought by MainPower and Kaiapoi Electricity, who set up MV Tuhoe Kaiapoi Rivertown Trust. Regular sailings resumed in June 2005. Over $200,000 was spent on repairs at Lyttelton, but when she returned on Sunday 27 September 2015 she grounded again on Waimakariri bar and leaked too much to be refloated. She was taken apart and the remains burnt on 12 October 2015.
Victory	1903	1907–1932	Bailey & Lowe, Auckland	22. 32 from 1909	Ketch built for Thomas & Drusella Wills, Kennedy Bay. 1905 two oil engines fitted. Tonnage changed to 26 gross. In October 1907 she was sold to NSS to serve Tauranga, Matatā and Te Puke, replaced in 1912 by Torea, initially whilst Victory was having new engines fitted. In August 1928 she was sold to her master, Captain Scopes, to continue trading to Waiuku. In 1932 she was sold to Avoca Coal Company of Dargaville, to A. Curel of Helensville, converted to a cruising vessel and re-engined with twin Kelvin diesels in 1937. In 1946 she was given to Kaipara Cruising Club, Helensville as a clubhouse. In October 1962 she was condemned and burnt.
Waihou		1897–1935	Not known		Waihou River barge
Waimana	1899	1899–1904	Lane & Brown, Totara North	152	Waimana in 1899 Auxiliary ketch built for NSS, but sold in 1904 as unsuited to the work. She used 1 long hundredweight (51 kg) of coal an hour in 2 × Thornycroft boilers, with 2 × 4-cylinder (5, 7, 9, 12)″ Kingdon engines, of 50 hp (37 kW) each, or 18 hp (13 kW), driving a single screw. She then went to a succession of Melbourne owners; M. Walsh in 1904, McIlwraith, McEacharn Ltd 1914, E. Taylor 1917 (when her steam engines were removed, diesel later being fitted), G. Dunkley 1920, Yarram Shipping Co 1923, E.J. Wright 1927, I.S. Angelinavich 1930, A.J. Coch 1930, W.G. Sims 1932, J.M. Angelin 1941 and, in 1947 to Roman Catholic Mission of New Guinea.
Waimarie	1896	1896–1931	Robert Logan Sr., Auckland	245	Waimarie on Waihou River Steamer built for NSS's Paeroa run (3 years before PS Waimarie), costing about £7,000 and launched on 4 February 1896. She had a hull of 3 layers of kauri planks, two A & G Price, compound, surface condensing engines drove twin screws. The main saloon had 70 berths and the ladies' saloon 20. Waimarie was the first of the fleet to have electric lighting, including a light of over 3,000 candlepower on her foremast to assist river navigation in poor light. In the 1900s Waimarie also ran short excursions from Auckland in mid summer. In 1915 she was slightly damaged in a collision with Taniwha off Ponui Island. In June 1921 the Paeroa service was reduced and Waimarie was laid up in the Waihou River, in July 1929 she was sold for scrap and towed to Auckland, where she was broken up in 1931. She was 102.2 ft (31.2 m) long, 22 ft (6.7 m) wide, 7.9 ft (2.4 m) deep, with 48 hp (36 kW) engines.
Waiotahi	1891	1891–1934	Abercorn Shipbuilding Co., Paisley	278	Waiotahi around 1910 Steamer launched on 9 June 1891 for NSS as a steel, passenger cargo ship, 125.5 ft (38.3 m) long, 25.1 ft (7.7 m) wide, 8.6 ft (2.6 m) deep, with a Hanna, Donald & Wilson twin compound 2 cylinder, 56 hp (42 kW) engine, driving 2 screws at about 9.5 kn (17.6 km/h; 10.9 mph). Her delivery voyage took 103 days, calling for coal at Suez and Thursday Island. She was built to carry maize from Ōpōtiki, but later was on the Parenga and Great Barrier route and ran other trips, including a Hauraki Gulf fishing excursion in 1897. She had electric lights fitted in 1908. She was replaced by motor ships in 1929 and laid up. In 1934 she was stripped at Auckland, and in 1937 broken up there.
Waiotahi	1932	1934–1961	G.T. Niccol	208	Motor ship, launched on 12 September 1932, 116 ft (35 m) long, 25 ft (7.6 m) wide, 6 ft (1.8 m) draught, with 2 × 120 hp (89 kW) Fairbanks Morse diesels, built as Atua by G.T. Niccol for his own use and the last ship built at his yard, but only used for a trip to Norfolk Island. In 1934 she was sold to NSS, renamed Waiotahi, and worked to the Bay of Plenty until 1960, and then between Picton and Onehunga, until sold to A G Frankham Ltd in 1961 for an Auckland–Gisborne route, then to Inter Island Shipping Company to link Kaiapoi and Wellington, with occasional trips to Golden Bay / Mohua, until 6 November 1967. In 1966 she grounded near the Waimakariri River entrance, but was refloated. From 1967 F Fawcett-Kay used her around the Solomon Islands, until she was scuttled in Rabaul Harbour in October 1973, due to the hull being eaten away by teredo worms.
Waipu	1915	1915–1935	John McGregor, Dunedin	205	Waipu being built in 1915 near Pelichet Bay A steel, shallow draught steamer, designed to carry more to and from Waipu than Victory (when the bar was passable), launched on 26 August 1915 with 31 berths, able to take up to 60 passengers and 60 tons, 110 feet (34 m) x 22 feet (6.7 m) x 5.5 feet (1.7 m), with two sets of main engines, powered by a 190 psi (1,300 kPa) boiler, 250 hp (190 kW), 2 screw, driving her at up to 10 knots (19 km/h; 12 mph). Her completion was delayed by a wartime shortage of pipes. Passenger accommodation was aft, officers' amidships and the crew's forward, with the cargo hold. She had steam steering gear, two large lifeboats and could steam at up to 9¾ knots. As early as 1917 low tides on the Waipu bar were delaying the ship for days. It became even shallower and she was transferred to Hauraki Gulf routes. She was replaced by Elsie, though she too grounded on the bar. Waipu was temporarily laid up in 1921. On 9 June 1924, coming down the fast flowing, flooded, Waihou, from Kerepehi to Ngatea, to collect butter, despite towing a drag astern to steady her, she slowed for the lifting span of the Ngatea Bridge, but the current swung her against the bridge. As she was winched through, the drag caught on telephone lines, cutting off many phones. She was laid up in May 1931, sold to KDV Box Company in 1935, converted to diesel and renamed MV Hokitika in 1936.
Waitangi	1889	1896–1911	Grangemouth Dockyard Company	171	Waitangi at Rarohara Bay (Ungunu Bay), Port Fitzroy in 1904 Steamer Waitangi started running for NSS on 30 September 1896, between Auckland and Thames. NSS changed her name from Banks Peninsula on 24 December 1896. She had been launched on 22 December 1888, completed in February 1889 for Peninsula and Akaroa Steam Navigation Company Ltd and registered in Lyttelton on 3 June 1889. She was a twin screw, steel, passenger cargo ship, 120 ft (37 m) long, 20 ft (6.1 m) wide, 7.9 ft (2.4 m) deep, with 2 × 2 cylinder (13.5, 27 × 18)″, 62 hp (46 kW), Hutson & Corbett, Glasgow engines driving her at 12 kn (22 km/h; 14 mph). She was divided with 4 watertight bulkheads and rigged as a schooner. In 1890 she was sold to Union, in 1891 to E.T. Miles, Hobart, in 1896 to NSS and renamed Waitangi. In 1909, when the Waitara bar silted up too much for her, she was replaced by Albatross. In 1911 she was sold to Kauri Timber Co. Ltd., Auckland. and to Pātea Farmers Freezing Company in early 1919 to trade between Wellington and Pātea with their other ship, Waverley. The passenger accommodation was removed, and she was insulated for frozen meat. On 5 May 1923 Waitangi she was wrecked at Pātea River mouth, with 46 tons of chaff for Pātea Farmers Co-op. She hit the Western Breakwater, holing the starboard side and ran aground on the Western Beach. The crew escaped and the cargo was retrieved undamaged. Holes were patched, and she was towed out to sea, but the tow cable had to be cut, leaving her to drift back onto the beach. The masts became gate posts at the entrance to Pātea Freezing Works and part of them later became the local museum's donation box. Part of the ship is still on the beach.
Waiuku	1913	1913–1931	John I. Thornycroft & Company, Hampshire	76	Waiuku at Waiuku about 1917 Motor barge 95 ft (29 m) long, 17 ft (5.2 m) wide, 5.4 ft (1.6 m) deep, 200 hp (150 kW), built for NSS as a pre-fabricated hull and assembled by Massey Brothers at Onehunga for the passenger service to Waiuku. She took 2 1/2 hours for the 28 mi (45 km) journey, with 4 stops, including Āwhitu. After bus competition saw the end of the Waiuku ferry in 1928, she was used for Hauraki Gulf excursions, then dismantled in 1931 at Auckland and broken up in 1945.
Wakatere	1896	1896–1929	Napier, Shanks & Bell, Yoker	441	Wakatere at Auckland about 1910 Paddle steamer with electric lighting, originally designed for Isle of Man service, Wakatere was launched on 30 May 1896 for NSS's Auckland-Thames route, to serve the goldfields, and, travelling via Suez, left Glasgow on 3 September 1896, arriving at Auckland on 3 December 1896. She was a 1,500-passenger, steel, steamer, 210.3 ft (64.1 m) × 26.2 ft (8.0 m) × 10.2 ft (3.1 m), with a 2-cylinder (31, 57 - 60)″, 140 hp (100 kW) engine by Bow, McLachlan & Co. Ltd, Paisley, driving her at up to 14 kn (26 km/h; 16 mph). A court hearing in 1913 found that a boiler collapse was due to lack of water and suspended the 2nd engineer's certificate. In 1914 she collided with a ketch, Katie S, off Ponui Island. A court found that the second mate should have kept to starboard of the ketch and charged him costs. In 1921 she was replaced on the Thames route by Aupouri, though restored, then replaced by Rangitoto and laid up in 1926. In 1929 she was sold to J.E. Appleton, Auckland to use as a shingle barge and broken up by Parry Brothers at Freemans Bay in 1933. The scrap was sent to Japan in 1934, with that from Aupouri.
Wanganui	1902	1923–1948	Duinker & Goedhoop, Martenshoek	351	Wanganui in 1916 Coal hulk, a former iron sailing ship, used as an oil bunker for new motor ships. 135 ft (41 m) x 25.8 ft (7.9 m) x 10.4 ft (3.2 m). Launched on 13 February 1902 as Voorlichter, a 3-masted schooner, for Maatschappij Zeilschip Voorlichter, Amsterdam, September 1910 to Herman C. Boye, Marstal, renamed Carla. She had difficulty entering Whanganui, ran aground on 21 September 1911 and was sold, together with her cargo of 450 tons of coal, for £290 to A. Hatrick & Co, who refloated her repaired the limited damage and, in 1912, renamed her Wanganui. In September 1912 the main mast broke. In 1916 she was sold to H. Bleakley, Sydney, 1918 to W. Archibald, Auckland, 1922 to G.T. Niccol, 1923 to NSS, February 1948 stripped and scuttled outside of Cuvier Island, after being towed from Auckland.
Wave	1904	1907–1918	Bailey & Lowe, Freemans Bay	41. 32 from 1909	Wave's launch in Auckland in 1904 Auxiliary scow, ketch, or schooner, launched on 9 January 1904, for Charles Kasper, Matakana. 56 ft (17 m) x 18 ft (5.5 m), draught 6.7 ft (2.0 m), with a 18 hp (13 kW) Union oil engine. In a favourable wind she could average 8 kn (15 km/h; 9.2 mph), carrying about 40 tons. In 1905 she passed to John P. Kasper, Auckland, who sold her to NSS in October 1907, as a Matatā-Tauranga feeder vessel, to replace Fingal. In 1908 her mast was broken by a willow tree near Canaan. By 1914 she was running to Shortland. 1915 re-engined and converted to twin screw. 1918 sold to Robert Burns of Auckland. In May 1919 she was sold by Nelson & Son, Samoa, to Brodniak & Co, Suva. On 29 November 1923 she was wrecked on Naselai reef, off the south coast of Tailevu Province, with 7 missing.
Weka	1894	1907–1919	William Holmes, North Shore	127	Weka at Waiuku Steamer launched on 19 October 1894 for Waiuku & Onehunga Steam Navigation Co, diagonally built of kauri, 95 ft (29 m) x 17 ft (5.2 m) x 6.5 ft (2.0 m), with 2 compound (9, 18 - 12)″, 115 psi (790 kPa) engines by George Fraser, sold to Manukau S.S. Company in 1903, which was taken over by NSS in 1906. When Waiuku replaced her, she was transferred to Piako. In 1919 she was sold to McCallum Bros. to tow shingle barges and renamed Kerepeehi. In 1923 she was sold to Devonport Steam Ferry Company and renamed Kiwi., with a very changed appearance. Further sales were to Bradney & Binns in 1927 and G. Parry, Auckland in 1934. In 1940 she was broken up in Auckland and her hull buried in a harbour reclamation.
Wellington	1863	1881–1909	Blackwood & Gordon, Port Glasgow	365 429 GT	Wellington at Picton Launched 24 October 1863 for New Zealand Steam Navigation Co, Wellington and transferred to New Zealand Steam Shipping Company (NZSS) in 1871 and on 24 June 1876, when Union took over NZSS, together with Lady Bird, Phoebe, Taranaki and Wellington for £47,400. Wellington was a 107-passenger, iron, single-screw steamer, 11 kn (20 km/h; 13 mph), with horse-stalls, 185.5 ft (56.5 m) x 24.6 ft (7.5 m) x 13.2 ft (4.0 m), with a 2-cylinder, 90 hp (67 kW) engine, which arrived on 3 June 1864. In 1881 she was sold to NSS, initially serving Tauranga-Auckland. She ran daily to Whangārei in 1900, but was laid up about 1905, after being used on the New Plymouth-Onehunga route. In December 1909 she was sold to George Turnbull Niccol, who converted her to a hulk at Auckland. In 1913 she was scuttled as a breakwater at Moehau, or at Whangārei.
