= Examination vessel =

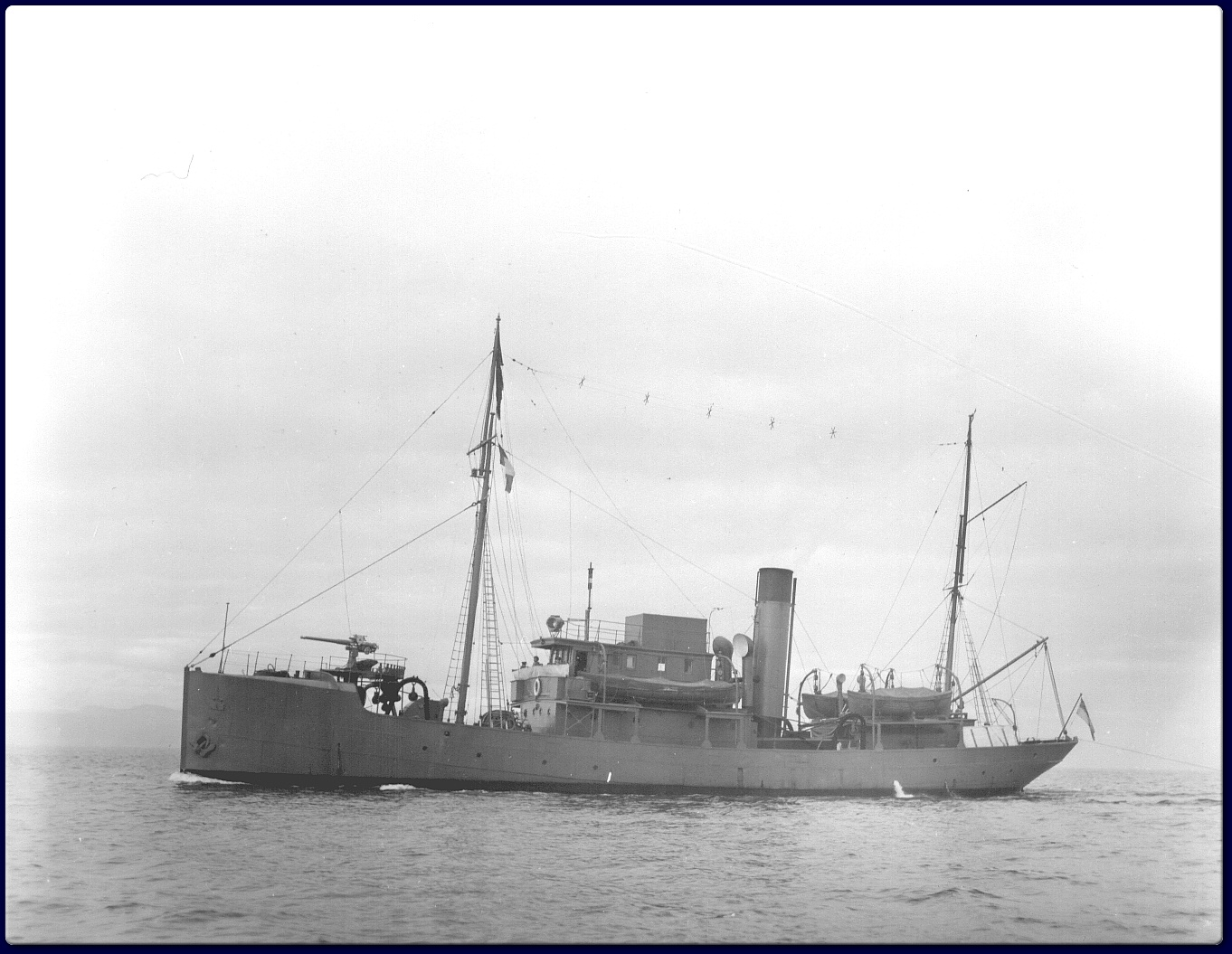
HMCS Armentières

An examination vessel is a vessel used to inspect ships and boats entering a port during wartime.

An examination vessel would typically be responsible for examining and verifying all merchant ships and small craft entering or departing a port. They would normally be equipped with one or more machine guns and in addition were often supported by one or more shore gun batteries, sometimes called examination batteries. In the case of United States Army Coast Artillery Corps defenses in World War II, a Harbor Entrance Control Post on shore would interrogate a vessel, and a nearby examination battery would be ready to respond if required. Duties might include boarding ships, examining papers to establish identity and belligerent status, and inspecting cargoes for legitimacy.

As an example of how an examination service might operate, here is an account of the procedure that operated in 1917 in Sydney Harbour:

"At midnight on 7 August all traffic entering and leaving the harbour was placed under strict naval control with the inauguration of an examination service under Captain Pasco's port defense organisation, to guard against surprise attack by disguised armed merchant ship raiders. No incoming ship could approach beyond the line between Flat Point and Cranberry Head without first establishing its identity to a naval examination vessel. Because no steamer was available this had to be performed by motor launches. The examination personnel, if satisfied, would order the gate of the submarine net to be opened. Vessels wishing to leave port would have to notify the examination one day in advance and receive, confidentially, a time when the gate would be briefly opened. Vessels could not enter or leave during darkness or when the weather was thick. One of primary responsibilities of the coastal batteries at Cranberry Head and Fort Petrie was to be ready at all times to open fire, first with warning shots and then for effect, on instructions from the examination staff... [No vessels] could pass, in or out, without displaying certain prearranged signals, set from day to day by the naval authorities."

== Vessels which served as examination vessels ==
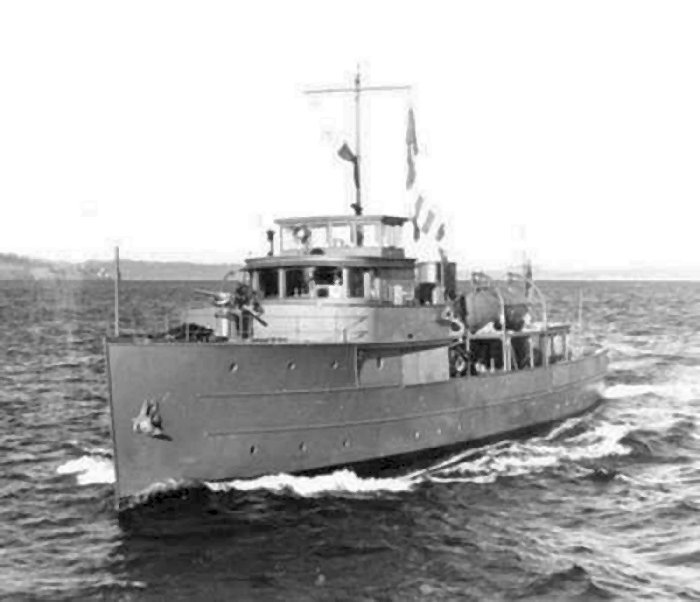
HMCS Cougar (Z15)

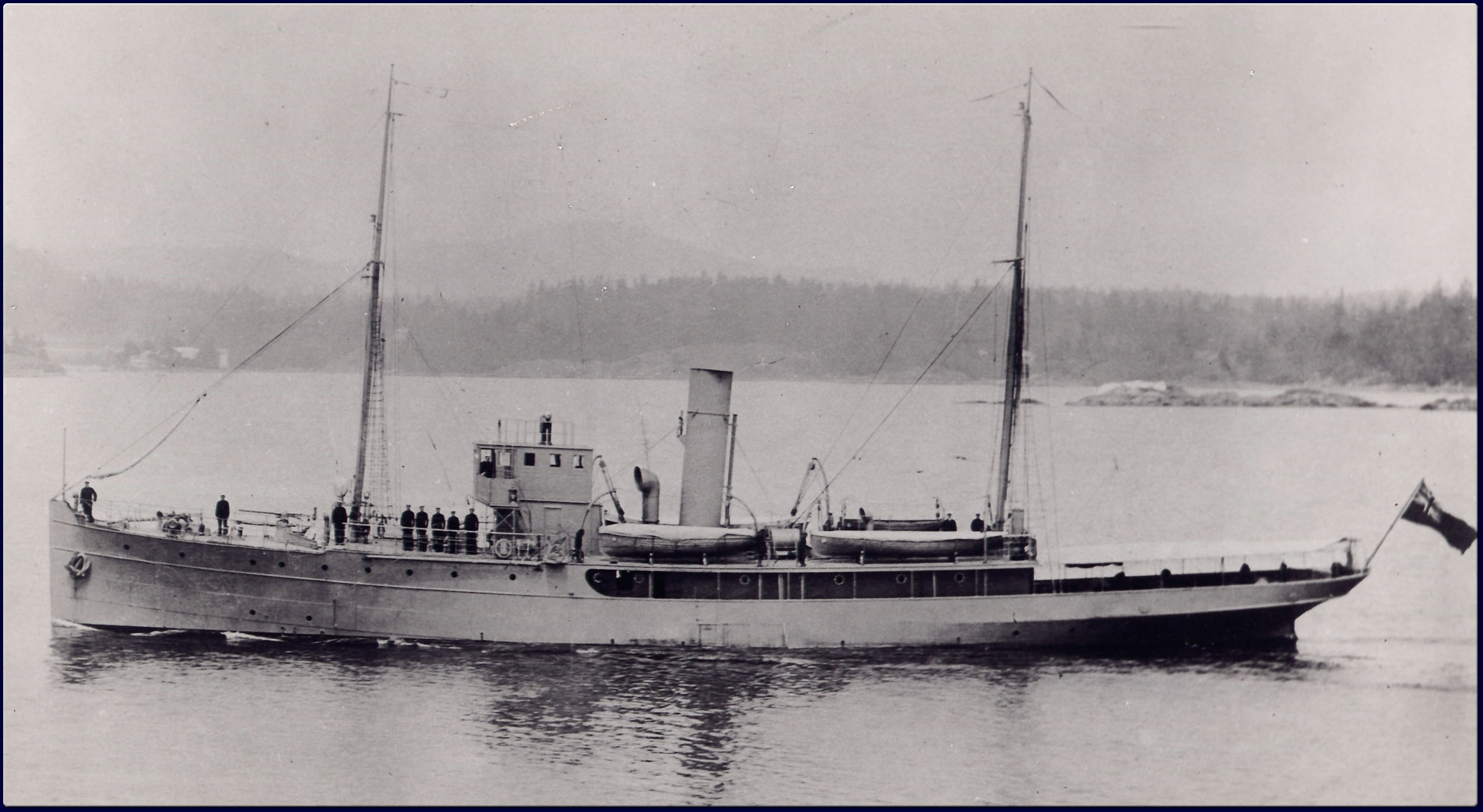
HMCS Malaspina

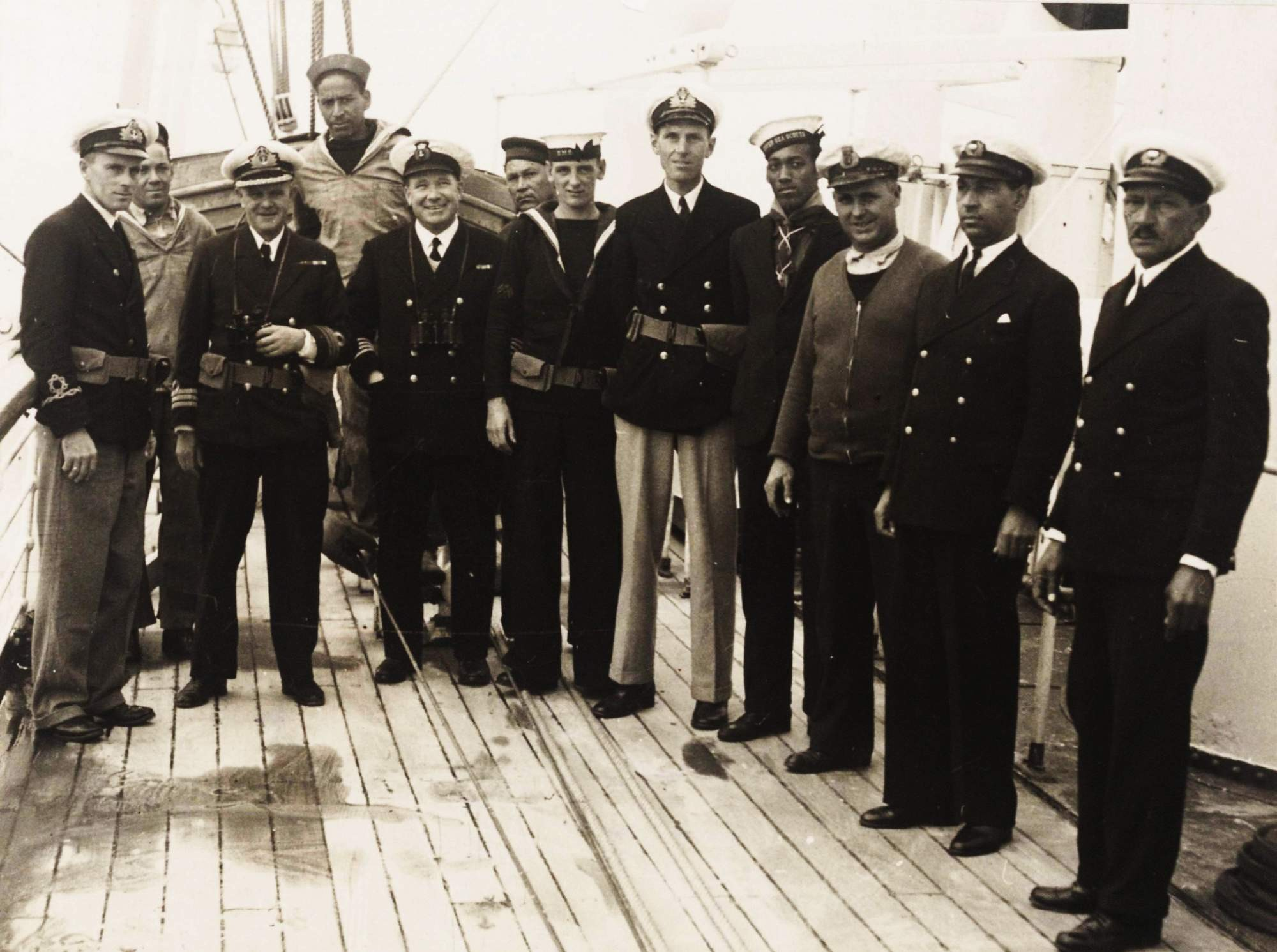
The crew of HMS Castle Harbour, assigned to the Royal Naval Dockyard in the Imperial fortress colony of Bermuda, which inspected vessels arriving at Five Fathom Hole, under the guns of St. David's Battery, designated the Examination Battery.

Australia

- Adele (1906)
- HMAS Kookaburra
- HMQS Otter
- HMAS Southern Cross

Canada

- HMCS Armentières
- HMCS Cougar (Z15)
- HMCS Malaspina
- HMCS Marvita

New Zealand

- Awanui
- Hauiti
- Ikatere
- Janie Seddon
- Lyttelton
- Stina
- Tuirangi
- Wairangi

South Africa

- HMSAS Clara
- HMSAS Stork
- HMSAS William Messina

United Kingdom

- Gladysfin
- HMS Castle Harbour
- Bermudian (ex-HMS Arctic Whale)
- HMS Sumar

United States

- LV-79/WAL-506
- LV-85/WAL-510
- LV-87/WAL-512
- LV-112/WAL-534
- LV-113/WAL-535
- LV-115/WAL-537

== See also ==
- Examination vessels of the Royal New Zealand Navy
