= Port vessels of the Royal New Zealand Navy =

Commissioned port vessels of the Royal New Zealand Navy from its formation on 1 October 1941 to the present. This includes examination and boom defence vessels, mine defence and degaussing ships and port tugs and tow boats

== Examination vessels ==
Name	Dates	Grt	Propulsion	Pnd	Port	Notes
Awanui	1939-41	170	240 bhp diesel, 9 knots (17 km/h)		Auckland	
Hauiti	1941-44	148	23 ihp SR CE steam, 8.5 knots (15.7 km/h)	Z05	Auckland	1944-46 liberty, stores
Ikatere	1940-45	43	150 bhp diesel, 8 knots (15 km/h)	Z01	Auckland	
Janie Seddon	1939-44	126	329 ihp SR CE coal, 9 knots (17 km/h)		Wellington	1944-46 liberty, general
Lyttelton	1942-44	292	800 ihp SR CE coal, 9 knots (17 km/h)		Lyttelton	
Stina	1942-44	16	51 bhp diesel, 7 knots (13 km/h)		Otago, Wellington	
Tuirangi	1942-44	114	145 bhp diesel, 9 knots (17 km/h)		Otago	
Wairangi	1940-44	28	70 bhp petrol, 8 knots (15 km/h)		Lyttelton	1944-46 recommissioned as Tasman, liberty, training

== Boom defence vessels ==
Name	Dates	Grt	Propulsion	Port	Notes
Claymore	1943-45	260	400 ihp SR TE coal	Auckland	former coastal cargo/passenger, bought from Northern Steamship in 1940 for parts, converted to BDV 1942, used for Sea Cadets in 1946, sunk with explosives in 1953
Mahoe	1943-46	24	80 bhp kerosine, 7 knots (13 km/h)	Wellington	former fishing vessel and tow boat
Wakarire	1943-44	819	500 ihp SR CE coal	Auckland	former harbour bucket dredge

In addition there were five smaller boom defence launches. These were in charge of a petty officer and therefore not truly commissioned.

== Mine defence and degaussing ships ==
Name	Dates	Grt	Propulsion	Port	Notes
Kiritona	1942-45	136	150 bhp petrol, 7 knots (13 km/h)	Auckland	former powered lighter
Vesper	1942-44	47	60 bhp diesel, 6 knots (11 km/h)	Wellington	former deck cargo scow

In addition another seven smaller launches functioned in mine defence and degaussing roles.

== Tugs and tow boats ==
Name	Dates	Grt	Propulsion	Port	Notes
Arataki i	1948-84	74	320 bhp diesel, 10 knots (19 km/h)		US Navy harbour tug
Arataki ii	1984-99	143	1100 bhp diesel, 12 knots (22 km/h)	Timaru	harbour tug
Hipi	1942-56	39	100 bhp diesel, 8 knots (15 km/h)	Auckland	Towing lighters
Kahanui	1942-45	207	800 ihp SR TE coal, 11 knots (20 km/h)	Wanganui	harbour tug
Manawanui i	1948-52	74	329 bhp diesel, 10 knots (19 km/h)	Auckland	US Navy harbour tug
Meola	1961-	19	76 bhp diesel, 9 knots (17 km/h)	Auckland	work boat
Toia	1926-49	423	1250 ihp SR TE coal, 12 knots (22 km/h)	Wellington	World War I Saint class naval tug, a notable salvage tug

== See also ==
- Current Royal New Zealand Navy ships
- List of ships of the Royal New Zealand Navy
