= Bird Island =

Bird Island or Bird Islands may refer to:

== Africa ==
- Bird Island (Namibia)
- Bird Island, Seychelles
  - Bird Island Airport
- Bird Island, Algoa Bay, South Africa
- Bird Island Nature Reserve (South Africa)

== Asia ==
- Bird Island, Mongolia
- Bird Islands, Qinghai Lake, China
- Kuş Island, Turkey
- Kuşadası, (Turkish, 'Bird Island'), Turkey
- Tori-shima (Izu Islands), (Japanese, 'Bird Island'), Japan

== Europe ==
- Bird Island, County Down, a townland in Northern Ireland, UK
- Bird Island, Slovakia

== North and Central America ==
=== United States ===
- Bird Island (Kitnamax), Aleutian Islands, Alaska
- Bird Island (Juneau, Alaska)
- Bird Island, Lake Louise, Alaska
- Bird Island, Brooks Island Regional Preserve, California
- Bird Island (Marin County, California)
- Bird Island (San Mateo County, California)
- Bird Island, a former island in Tulare Lake, California
- Bird Island (Massachusetts)
- Bird Island, Minnesota
- Bird Island Township, Renville County, Minnesota
- Bird Island (Montana), an island in Montana
- Bird Island, North Carolina
- Bird Island, Harris Beach State Park, Oregon
- Bird Island, Utah, a small island in Utah Lake, Utah

=== Elsewhere ===
- Bird Island (Belize)
- Bird Island, Bermuda
- Bird Islands (Nunavut), Canada
- Isla de Aves (Spanish, 'Island of Birds'), a Caribbean dependency of Venezuela

== Oceania ==
=== Australia ===
- Bird Island Nature Reserve, New South Wales, Australia
- Bird Islands (Queensland), Australia
- Bird Island, Whitsunday Islands, Queensland, Australia
- Bird Island in the Port River estuary north of Adelaide, South Australia
- Bird Islands Conservation Park, Spencer Gulf, South Australia, Australia
- Bird Island (Tasmania), Australia
- Bird Island (Prime Seal Group), Tasmania, Australia
- Bird Island (Western Australia), the name of three islands

=== New Zealand ===
- Bird Island (Southland)
- Bird Island (Otago)
- Bird Island (Tasman Region)
- Bird Island (Marlborough)
- Bird Island (North Island)

=== Hawaii ===
- Bird Island (Pearl and Hermes Atoll), Hawaii
- Bird Island, or Moku Manu, Hawaii
- Bird Island, or Nīhoa, Hawaii
- Bird Island, Palmyra Atoll, Line Islands

== South America ==
- Bird Island, Falkland Islands
- Bird Island, South Georgia

== Other uses ==
- Bird Island (radio series)
- Bird Island, a fictional island in the Angry Birds films

== See also ==
- Bird Key and Bird Key (Miami), islands in Florida, U.S.
- Bird Rock (disambiguation)
