= List of mammals of Hungary =

This list of mammals of Hungary shows the IUCN Red List status of mammal species occurring in Hungary. Two are endangered, seven are vulnerable, and four are near threatened.

Icons which state each species' global IUCN status:
CR	Critically Endangered	In imminent risk of extinction in the wild
EN	Endangered	Facing an extremely high risk of extinction in the wild
VU	Vulnerable	Facing a high risk of extinction in the wild
NT	Near Threatened	Doesn't meet any criteria that would categorise it as risking extinction but likely to in the future
LC	Least Concern	No current identifiable risks to this species
DD	Data Deficient	Inadequate information to make an assessment of the risks to this species

== Order: Rodentia (rodents) ==
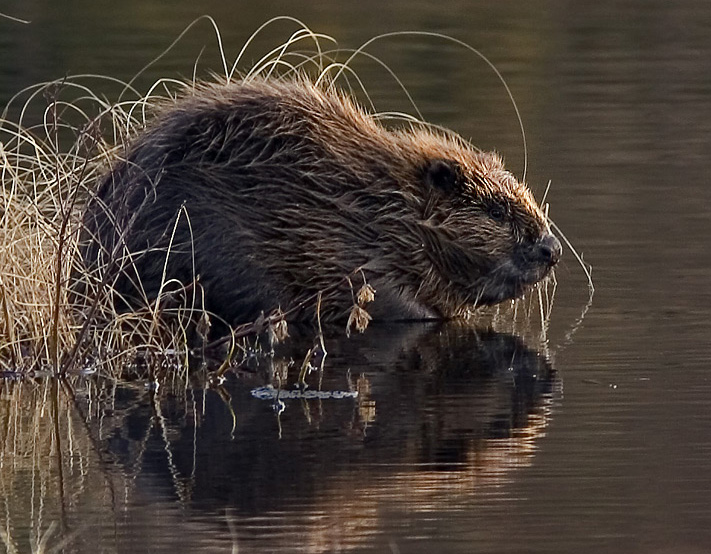
European beaver

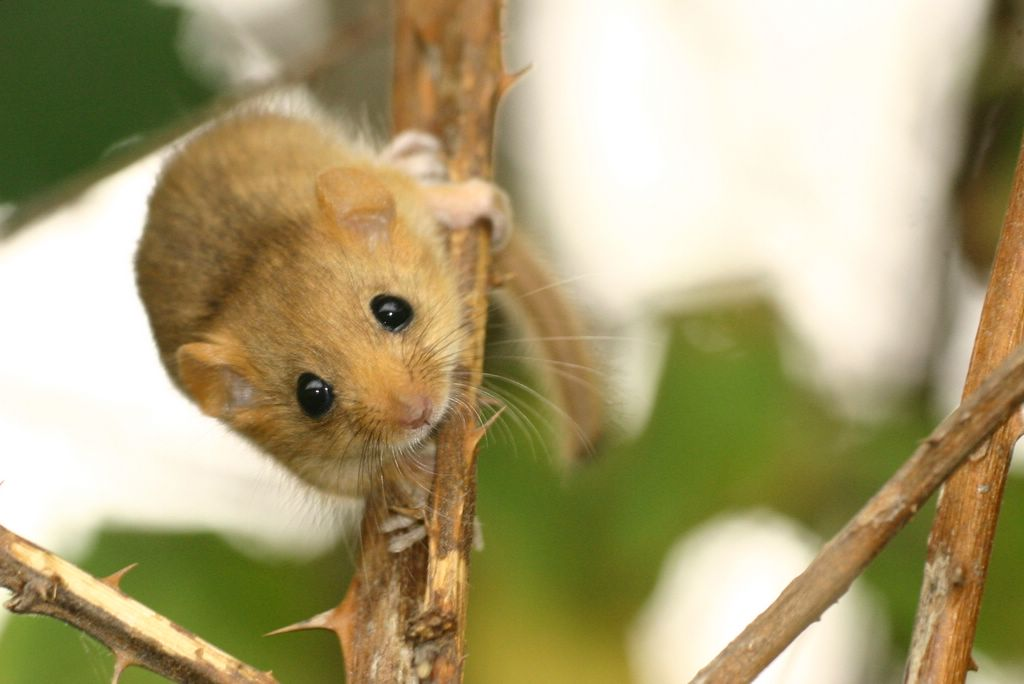
Hazel dormouse

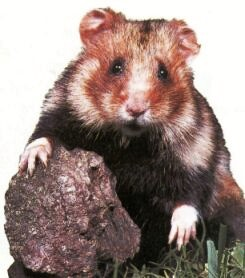
European hamster

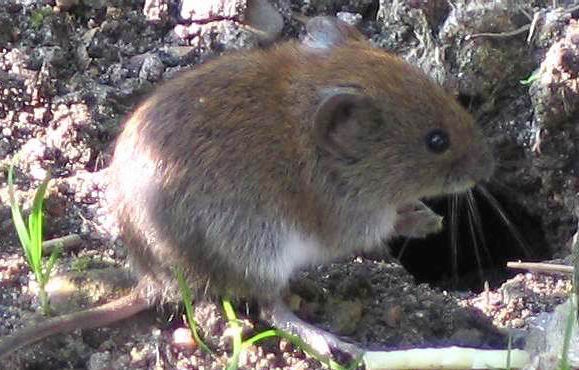
Bank vole

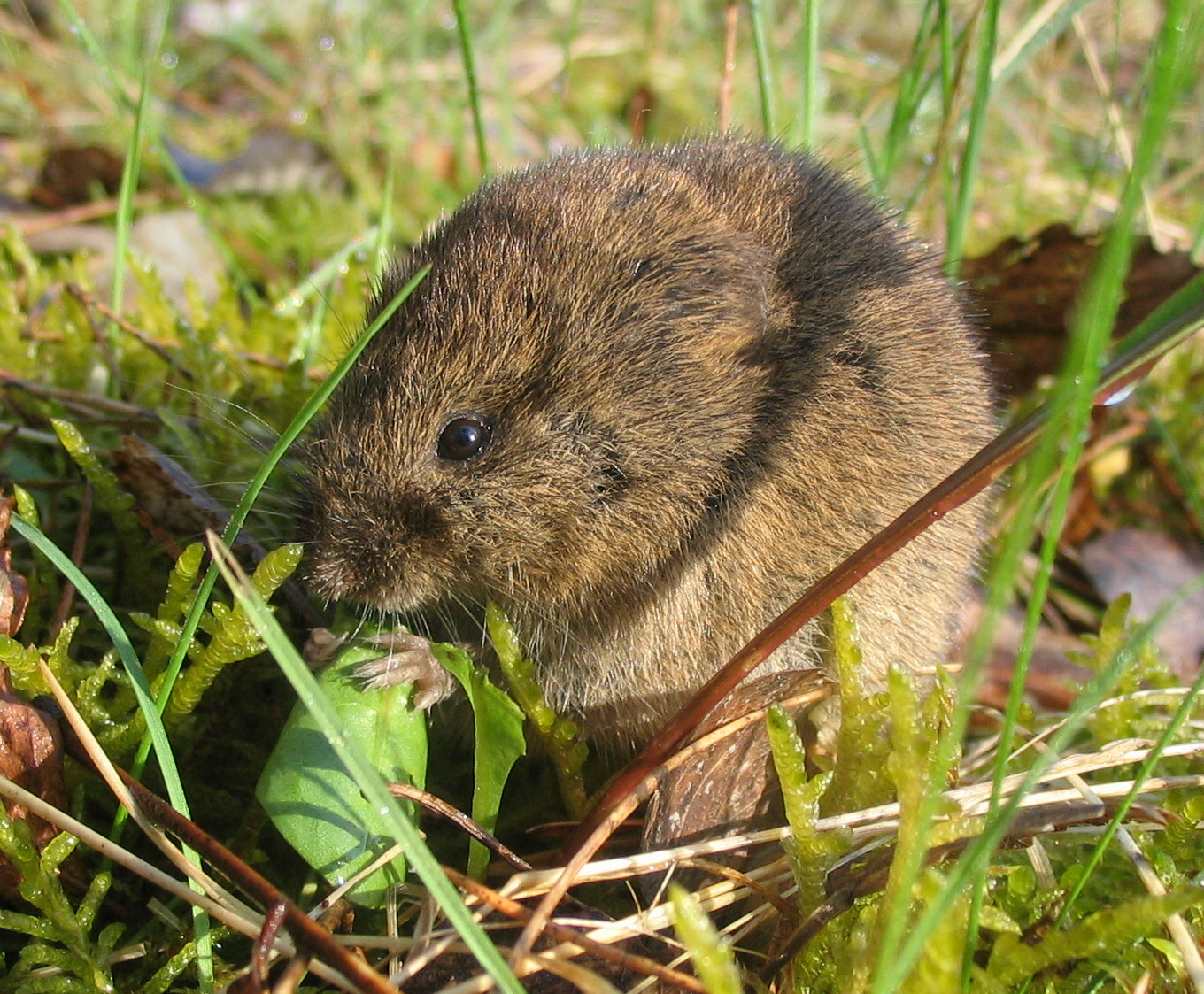
Common vole

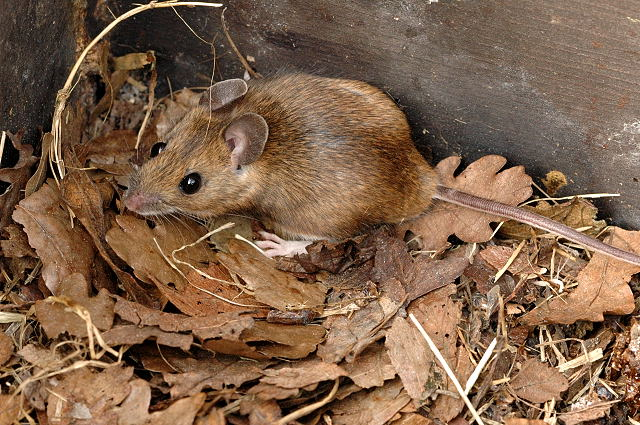
Yellow-necked mouse

Rodents make up the largest order of mammals, with over 40% of mammalian species. They have two incisors in the upper and lower jaw which grow continually and must be kept short by gnawing. Most rodents are small though the capybara can weigh up to 45 kg (100 lb).

- Suborder: Sciurognathi
  - Family: Castoridae (beavers)
    - Genus: Castor
      - Eurasian beaver, C. fiber LC
  - Family: Sciuridae (squirrels)
    - Subfamily: Sciurinae
      - Tribe: Sciurini
        - Genus: Sciurus
          - Red squirrel, S. vulgaris LC
    - Subfamily: Xerinae
      - Tribe: Marmotini
        - Genus: Spermophilus
          - European ground squirrel, Spermophilus citellusEN
  - Family: Gliridae (dormice)
    - Subfamily: Leithiinae
      - Genus: Dryomys
        - Forest dormouse, Dryomys nitedulaLC
      - Genus: Muscardinus
        - Hazel dormouse, Muscardinus avellanariusLC
    - Subfamily: Glirinae
      - Genus: Glis
        - European edible dormouse, Glis glisLC
  - Family: Dipodidae (jerboas)
    - Subfamily: Sicistinae
      - Genus: Sicista
        - Southern birch mouse, Sicista subtilisLC
  - Family: Spalacidae
    - Subfamily: Spalacinae
      - Genus: Nannospalax
        - Lesser mole rat, Nannospalax leucodonLC
  - Family: Cricetidae
    - Subfamily: Cricetinae
      - Genus: Cricetus
        - European hamster, C. cricetus CR
    - Subfamily: Arvicolinae
      - Genus: Arvicola
        - Water vole, Arvicola terrestrisLC
      - Genus: Clethrionomys
        - Bank vole, Clethrionomys glareolusLC
      - Genus: Microtus
        - Field vole, Microtus agrestisLC
        - Common vole, Microtus arvalisLC
        - Tundra vole, Microtus oeconomusLC
        - European pine vole, Microtus subterraneusLC
      - Genus: Ondatra
        - Muskrat, Ondatra zibethicusLC introduced
  - Family: Muridae (mice, rats, voles, gerbils, hamsters, etc.)
    - Subfamily: Murinae
      - Genus: Apodemus
        - Striped field mouse, Apodemus agrariusLC
        - Yellow-necked mouse, Apodemus flavicollisLC
        - Wood mouse, Apodemus sylvaticusLC
        - Ural field mouse, Apodemus uralensisLC
      - Genus: Micromys
        - Harvest mouse, Micromys minutusLC
      - Genus: Mus
        - House mouse, Mus musculusLC introduced
        - Steppe mouse, Mus spicilegusLC
      - Genus: Rattus
        - Brown rat, Rattus norvegicusLC introduced
        - Black rat, Rattus rattusLC introduced

== Order: Lagomorpha (lagomorphs) ==
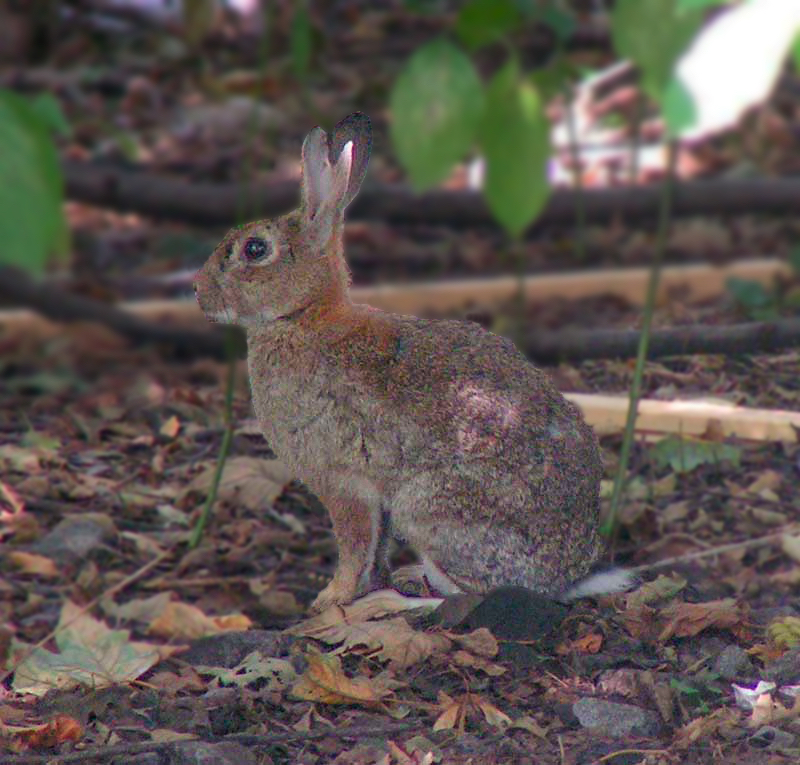
European rabbit

The lagomorphs comprise two families, Leporidae (hares and rabbits), and Ochotonidae (pikas). Though they can resemble rodents, and were classified as a superfamily in that order until the early 20th century, they have since been considered a separate order. They differ from rodents in a number of physical characteristics, such as having four incisors in the upper jaw rather than two.

- Family: Leporidae (rabbits, hares)
  - Genus: Oryctolagus
    - European rabbit, O. cuniculus NT introduced
  - Genus: Lepus
    - European hare, L. europaeus LC

== Order: Eulipotyphla (hedgehogs, shrews and moles) ==
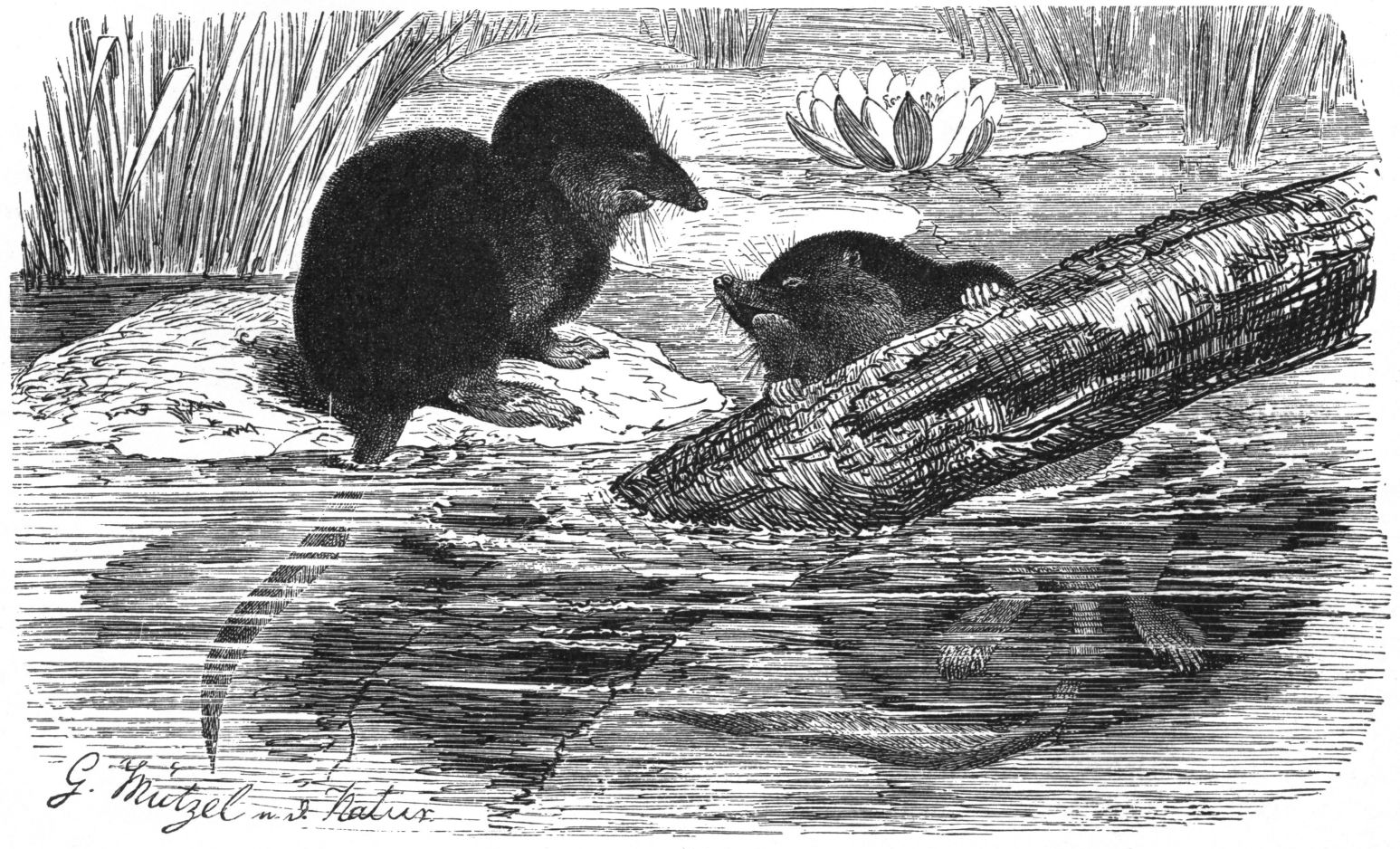
Eurasian water shrew

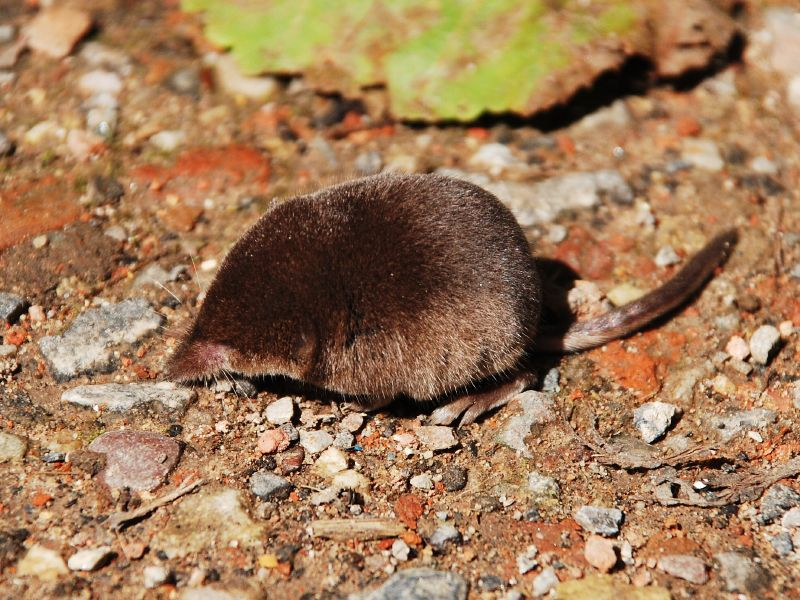
Eurasian pygmy shrew

Hedgehogs are easily recognised by their spines, shrews closely resemble mice, and moles are stout-bodied burrowers.

- Family: Erinaceidae (hedgehogs)
  - Subfamily: Erinaceinae
    - Genus: Erinaceus
      - Northern white-breasted hedgehog, E. roumanicus LC
- Family: Soricidae (shrews)
  - Subfamily: Crocidurinae
    - Genus: Crocidura
      - Bicolored shrew, Crocidura leucodonLC
      - Lesser white-toothed shrew, Crocidura suaveolens LC
  - Subfamily: Soricinae
    - Tribe: Nectogalini
      - Genus: Neomys
        - Southern water shrew, Neomys anomalusLC
        - Eurasian water shrew, Neomys fodiensLC
    - Tribe: Soricini
      - Genus: Sorex
        - Alpine shrew, Sorex alpinusNT
        - Common shrew, Sorex araneusLC
        - Eurasian pygmy shrew, Sorex minutusLC
- Family: Talpidae (moles)
  - Subfamily: Talpinae
    - Tribe: Talpini
      - Genus: Talpa
        - European mole, Talpa europaeaLC

== Order: Chiroptera (bats) ==
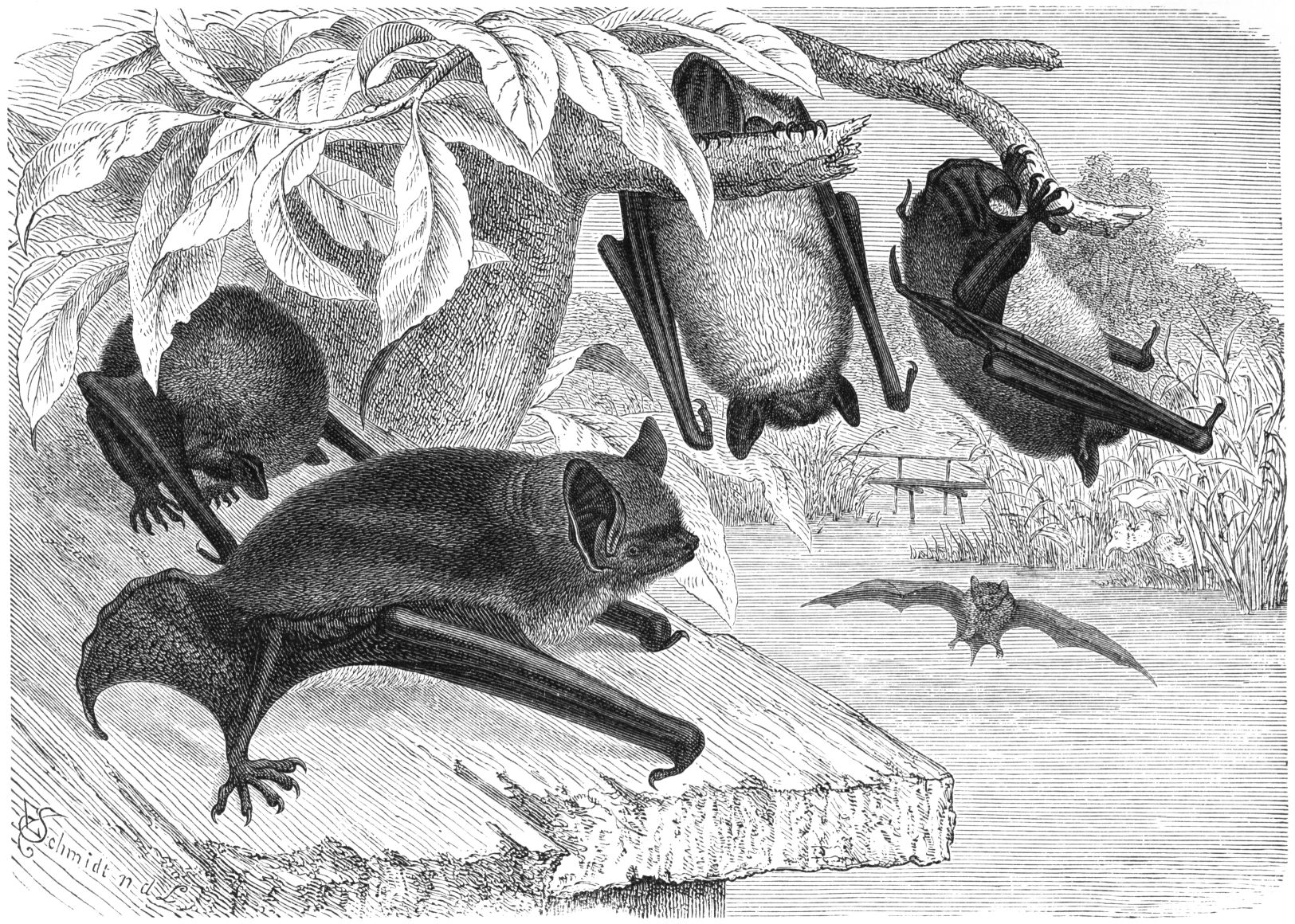
Daubenton's bat

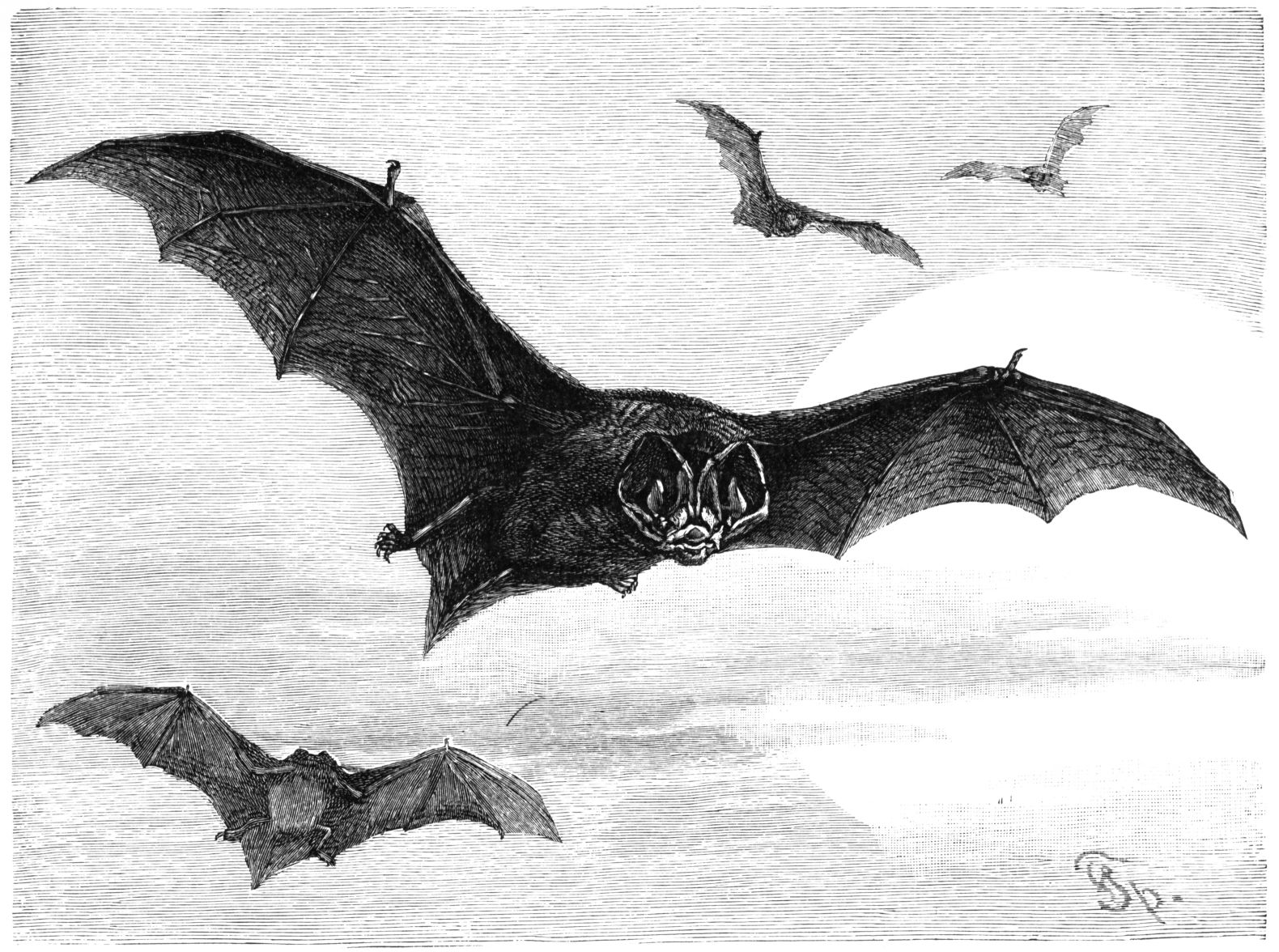
Western barbastelle

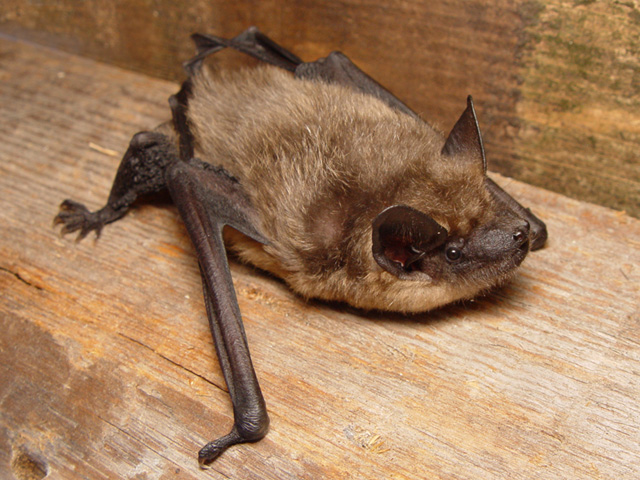
Serotine bat

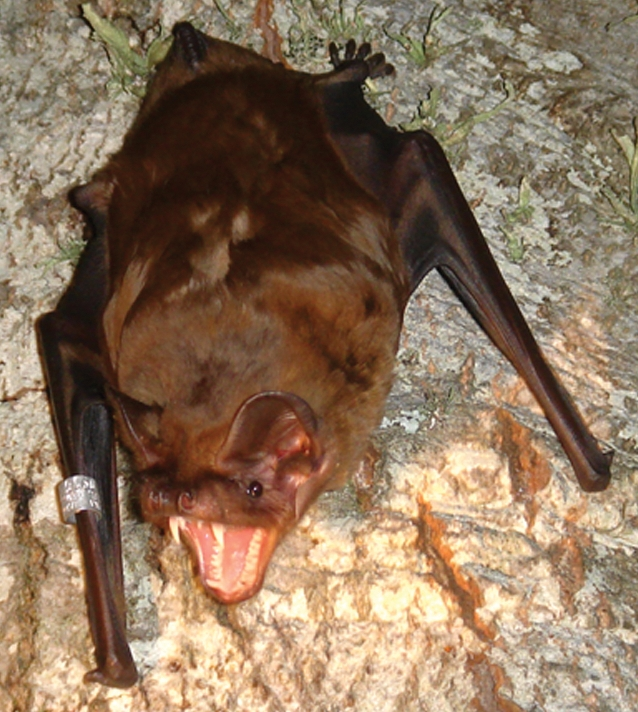
Greater noctule bat

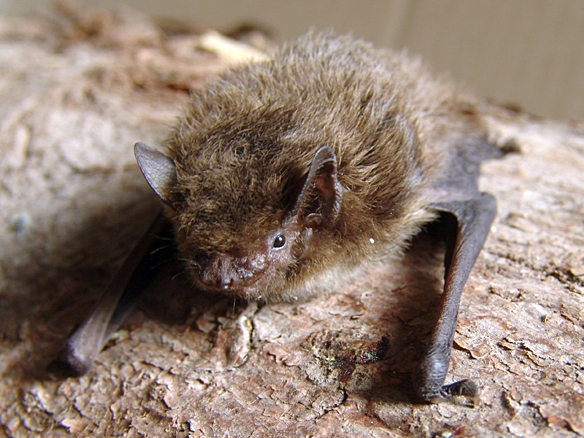
Nathusius' pipistrelle

The bats' most distinguishing feature is that their forelimbs are developed as wings, making them the only mammals capable of flight. Bat species account for about 20% of all mammals.

- Family: Vespertilionidae
  - Subfamily: Myotinae
    - Genus: Myotis
      - Bechstein's bat, M. bechsteini NT
      - Lesser mouse-eared bat, M. blythii LC
      - Brandt's bat, M. brandti LC
      - Pond bat, M. dasycneme NT
      - Daubenton's bat, M. daubentonii LC
      - Geoffroy's bat, M. emarginatus LC
      - Greater mouse-eared bat, M. myotis LC
      - Whiskered bat, M. mystacinus LC
      - Natterer's bat, M. nattereri LC
      - Schaub's myotis, Myotis schaubi DD extirpated
  - Subfamily: Vespertilioninae
    - Genus: Barbastella
      - Western barbastelle, B. barbastellus NT
    - Genus: Eptesicus
      - Northern bat, Eptesicus nilssoniLC
      - Serotine bat, Eptesicus serotinusLC
    - Genus: Nyctalus
      - Greater noctule bat, N. lasiopterus VU
      - Lesser noctule, N. leisleri LC
    - Genus: Pipistrellus
      - Nathusius' pipistrelle, P. nathusii LC
      - Common pipistrelle, P. pipistrellusLC
    - Genus: Plecotus
      - Grey long-eared bat, P. austriacus NT
  - Subfamily: Miniopterinae
    - Genus: Miniopterus
      - Common bent-wing bat, M. schreibersii VU
- Family: Molossidae
  - Genus: Tadarida
    - European free-tailed bat, Tadarida teniotisLC
- Family: Rhinolophidae
  - Subfamily: Rhinolophinae
    - Genus: Rhinolophus
      - Mediterranean horseshoe bat, R. euryale NT
      - Greater horseshoe bat, R. ferrumequinum LC
      - Lesser horseshoe bat, R. hipposideros LC

== Order: Carnivora (carnivorans) ==
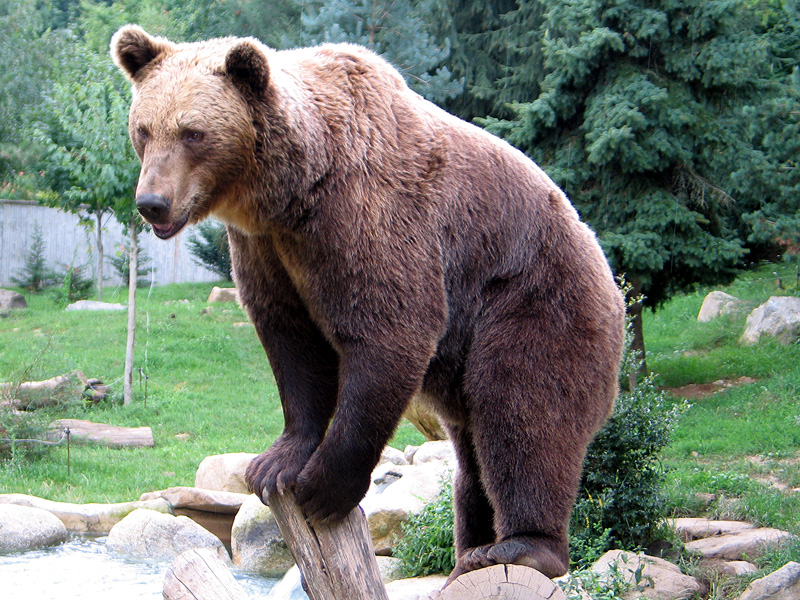
Brown bear

Reed wolf (Canis aureus moreotica), a subspecies of golden jackal present in Hungary

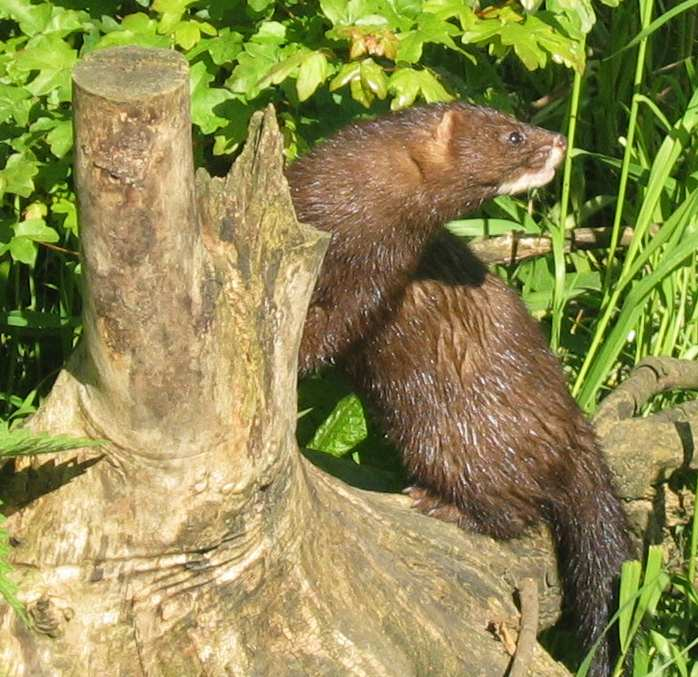
European mink

There are over 260 species of carnivorans, the majority of which feed primarily on meat. They have a characteristic skull shape and dentition.

- Suborder: Feliformia
  - Family: Felidae (cats)
    - Subfamily: Felinae
      - Genus: Felis
        - European wildcat, F. silvestris LC
      - Genus: Lynx
        - Eurasian lynx, L. lynx LC
          - Carpathian lynx L. l. carpathicus
- Suborder: Caniformia
  - Family: Canidae (dogs, foxes)
    - Genus: Vulpes
      - Red fox, V. vulpes LC
    - Genus: Canis
      - Gray wolf, C. lupus LC
        - Eurasian wolf, C. l. lupus
      - Golden jackal, C. aureus LC
        - European jackal, C. a. moreoticus
  - Family: Mustelidae (mustelids)
    - Genus: Lutra
      - European otter, L. lutra NT
    - Genus: Martes
      - Beech marten, M. foina LC
      - European pine marten, M. martes LC
    - Genus: Meles
      - European badger, M. meles LC
    - Genus: Mustela
      - Stoat, M. erminea LC
      - Least weasel, M. nivalis LC
      - European polecat, M. putorius LC
    - Genus: Neogale
      - American mink, N. vison LC presence uncertain, introduced

== Order: Perissodactyla (odd-toed ungulates) ==
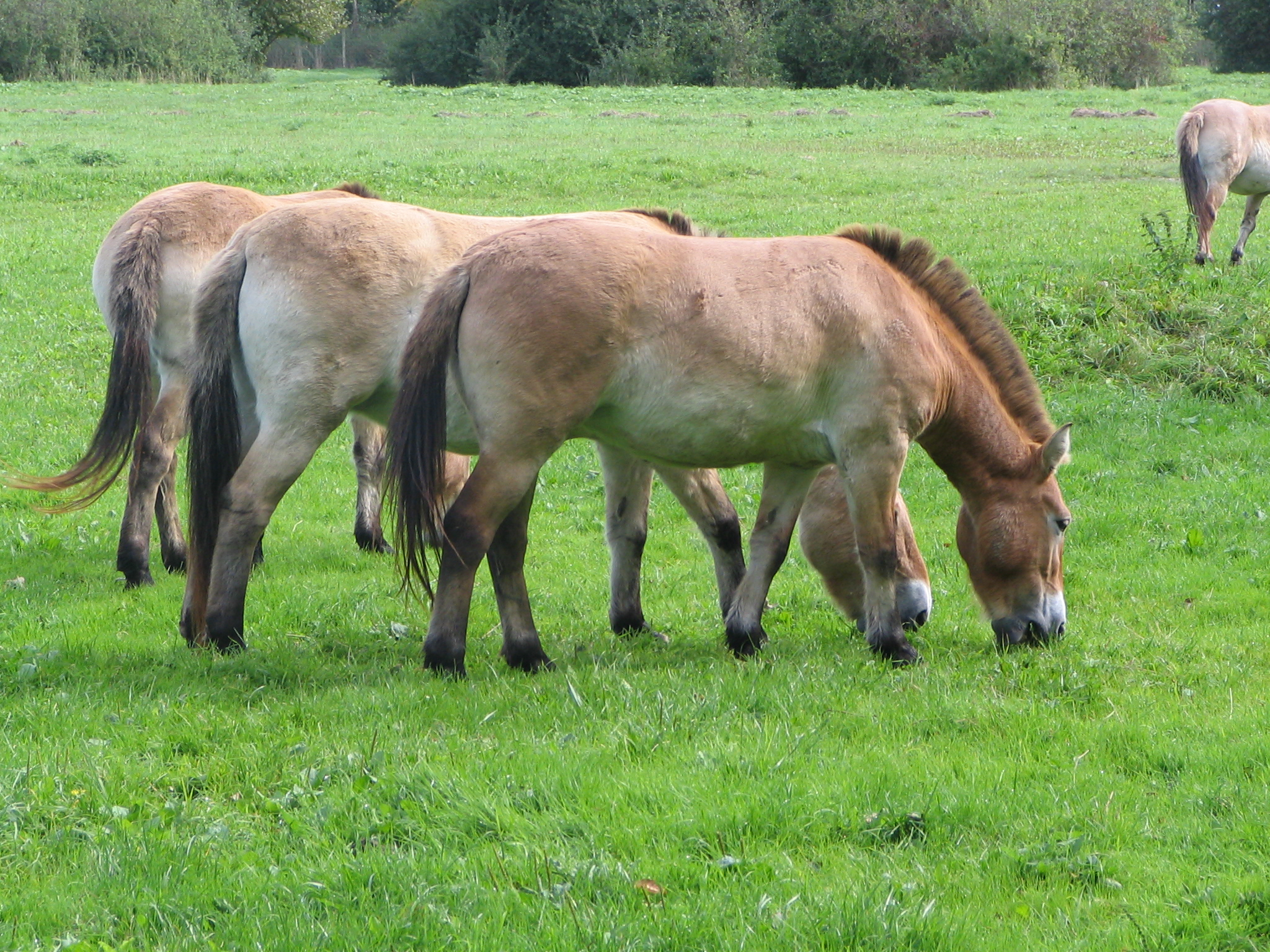
Przewalski's horse

The odd-toed ungulates are browsing and grazing mammals. They are usually large to very large, and have relatively simple stomachs and a large middle toe.

- Family: Equidae (horses etc.)
  - Genus: Equus
    - Wild horse, E. ferus EN reintroduced
      - Przewalski's horse, E. f. przewalskii EN reintroduced

== Order: Artiodactyla (even-toed ungulates) ==
The even-toed ungulates are ungulates whose weight is borne about equally by the third and fourth toes, rather than mostly or entirely by the third as in perissodactyls. There are about 220 artiodactyl species, including many that are of great economic importance to humans.

- Family: Cervidae (deer)
  - Subfamily: Capreolinae
    - Genus: Alces
      - Moose, A. alces LC
    - Genus: Capreolus
      - Roe deer, C. capreolus LC
  - Subfamily: Cervinae
    - Genus: Cervus
      - Red deer, C. elaphus LC
    - Genus: Dama
      - European fallow deer, D. damaLC introduced
- Family: Suidae (pigs)
  - Subfamily: Suinae
    - Genus: Sus
      - Wild boar, S. scrofa LC

== Locally extinct ==
- European bison, Bison bonasus
- European mink, Mustela lutreola
- Brown bear, Ursus arctos

== See also ==
- List of birds of Hungary
- List of reptiles of Hungary
- List of amphibians of Hungary
- List of chordate orders
- Lists of mammals by region
- List of prehistoric mammals
- Mammal classification
- List of mammals described in the 2000s
