= Bird Rock =

Bird Rock may refer to the following places:

== Australia ==
- Bird Rock (Tasmania)
- Bird Rock, Point Lillias, Victoria
- Bird Rock, the name of several rocks in Western Australia
- Bird Rock, Norfolk Island

== Canada ==
- Bird Rock (Magdalen Islands), the location of a lighthouses in Canada
- Bird Rock (Newfoundland), seabird colony at Cape St. Mary's Ecological Reserve

== Caribbean ==
- Bird Rock, Basseterre Valley, Saint Kitts
- Bird Rock, Maycock's Bay, Barbados
- Bird Rock, Dominica, otherwise known as Isla de Aves, a Caribbean dependency of Venezuela

== New Zealand ==
- Bird Rock (Poor Knights Islands)
- Bird Rock, Mokohinau Islands
- Bird Rocks, Great Barrier Island

== United Kingdom ==
- Craig yr Aderyn, or Birds' Rock, in Gwynedd, Wales

== United States ==
- Bird Rock (Marin County, California)
- Bird Rock, San Diego, a neighborhood of La Jolla, California
- Bird Rock State Marine Conservation Area and Blue Cavern State Marine Conservation Areas, Catalina Island, California

== See also ==
- Bird's Rock (disambiguation)
- Bird Island (disambiguation)
- Bird Key and Bird Key (Miami), islands in Florida, U.S.
