= Bird Island, Mongolia =

Lake island in Bayankhongor Province, Mongolia

Bird Island or Island of a Thousand Birds (Mongolian: Myangan Shuvuunii Aral) is a small island in northwestern Mongolia, noted for being a popular destination for bird watching. It is located on the Böön Tsagaan Lake in the Bayankhongor Province.

== Bird watching ==
It is noted as a top site for bird watching in Mongolia, with the best season being from May to July.

Migratory species stopping over on the island are:

- Gulls and terns: relict gull (NT), Mongolian gull (Larus mongolicus), little tern (Sternula albifrons)
- Shorebirds: Kentish plover (Charadrius alexandrinus), Pallas's sandgrouse (Syrrhaptes paradoxus)
- Waterfowl: Red-crested pochard, Caspian tern (Hydroprogne caspia)
