= List of birds of Hungary =

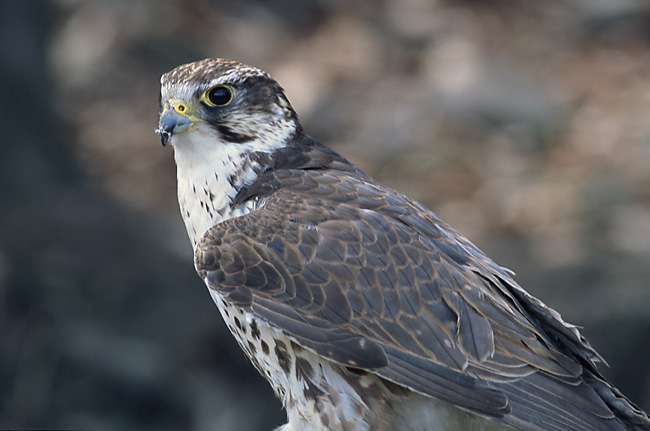
The saker falcon is the national bird of Hungary.

This is a list of the bird species recorded in Hungary. The avifauna of Hungary included a total of 397 confirmed species as of 2022, according to Hungarianbirdwatching.com. Of them, 106 are rare or accidental and six have been introduced by humans. None are endemic.

This list's taxonomic treatment (designation and sequence of orders, families and species) and nomenclature (English and scientific names) are those of The Clements Checklist of Birds of the World, 2022 edition. The Hungarian names in parentheses are from Hungarianbirdwatching.com.

The following tags have been used to highlight some categories of occurrence; the tags are from Bird Checklists of the World.

- (A) Accidental - a species that rarely or accidentally occurs in Hungary
- (I) Introduced - a species introduced to Hungary as a consequence, direct or indirect, of human actions, and has become established

== Ducks, geese, and waterfowl ==
Order: Anseriformes Family: Anatidae

Anatidae includes the ducks and most duck-like waterfowl, such as geese and swans. These birds are adapted to an aquatic existence with webbed feet, flattened bills, and feathers that are excellent at shedding water due to an oily coating.

- Bar-headed goose (indiai lúd), Anser indicus (I)
- Graylag goose (nyári lúd), Anser anser
- Greater white-fronted goose (nagy lilik), Anser albifrons
- Lesser white-fronted goose (kis lilik), Anser erythropus (A)
- Bean goose (vetési lúd), Anser fabalis/Anser serrirostris (Note: Clements has split bean goose into taiga and tundra bean-goose; Hungarianbirdwatching.com does not specify which has been recorded.)
- Pink-footed goose (rövidcsőrű lúd), Anser brachyrhynchus (A)
- Brant (örvös lúd), Branta bernicla
- Barnacle goose (apácalúd), Branta leucopsis (A)
- Canada goose (kanadai lúd), Branta canadensis (I)
- Red-breasted goose (vörösnyakú lúd), Branta ruficollis
- Mute swan (bütykös hattyú), Cygnus olor
- Tundra swan (kis hattyú), Cygnus columbianus (A)
- Whooper swan (énekes hattyú), Cygnus cygnus
- Egyptian goose (nílusi lúd), Alopochen aegyptiaca (I)
- Ruddy shelduck (vörös ásólúd), Tadorna ferruginea
- Common shelduck (bütykös ásólúd), Tadorna tadorna
- Garganey (böjti réce), Spatula querquedula
- Blue-winged teal (kékszárnyú réce), Spatula discors (A)
- Northern shoveler (kanalas réce), Spatula clypeata
- Gadwall (kendermagos réce), Mareca strepera
- Eurasian wigeon (fütyülő réce), Mareca penelope
- American wigeon (álarcos réce), Mareca americana (A)
- Mallard (tőkés réce), Anas platyrhynchos
- Northern pintail (nyílfarkú réce), Anas acuta
- Green-winged teal (csörgő réce), Anas crecca
- Marbled teal (márványos réce), Marmaronetta angustirostris (A)
- Red-crested pochard (üstökösréce), Netta rufina
- Common pochard (barátréce), Aythya ferina
- Ring-necked duck (örvös réce), Aythya collaris (A)
- Ferruginous duck (cigányréce), Aythya nyroca
- Tufted duck (kontyos réce), Aythya fuligula
- Greater scaup (hegyi réce), Aythya marila
- Lesser scaup (búbos réce), Aythya affinis
- Steller's eider (steller-pehelyréce), Polysticta stelleri (A)
- King eider (cifra pehelyréce), Somateria spectabilis (A)
- Common eider (pehelyréce), Somateria mollissima (A)
- Velvet scoter (füstös réce), Melanitta fusca
- Common scoter (fekete réce), Melanitta nigra (A)
- Long-tailed duck (jegesréce), Clangula hyemalis (A)
- Common goldeneye (kerceréce), Bucephala clangula
- Smew (kis bukó), Mergellus albellus
- Common merganser (nagy bukó), Mergus merganser
- Red-breasted merganser (örvös bukó), Mergus serrator
- Ruddy duck (halcsontfarkú réce), Oxyura jamaicensis (I)
- White-headed duck (kékcsőrű réce), Oxyura leucocephala (A)

== Pheasants, grouse, and allies ==
Order: Galliformes Family: Phasianidae

The Phasianidae are a family of terrestrial birds. In general, they are plump (although they vary in size) and have broad, relatively short wings.

- Common quail (fürj), Coturnix coturnix
- Ring-necked pheasant (fácán), Phasianus colchicus (I)
- Gray partridge (fogoly), Perdix perdix
- Western capercaillie (siketfajd), Tetrao urogallus (A)
- Black grouse (nyírfajd), Lyrurus tetrix (A) (extirpated)
- Hazel grouse (császármadár), Tetrastes bonasia

== Flamingos ==
Order: Phoenicopteriformes Family: Phoenicopteridae

Flamingos are gregarious wading birds, usually 3 to 5 feet (0.9 to 1.5 m) tall, found in both the Western and Eastern Hemispheres. Flamingos filter-feed on shellfish and algae. Their oddly shaped beaks are specially adapted to separate mud and silt from the food they consume and, uniquely, are used upside-down.

- Greater flamingo (rózsás flamingó), Phoenicopterus roseus

== Grebes ==
Order: Podicipediformes Family: Podicipedidae

Grebes are small to medium-large freshwater diving birds. They have lobed toes and are excellent swimmers and divers. However, they have their feet placed far back on the body, making them quite ungainly on land.

- Little grebe (kis vöcsök), Tachybaptus ruficollis
- Horned grebe (füles vöcsök), Podiceps auritus
- Red-necked grebe (vörösnyakú vöcsök), Podiceps grisegena
- Great crested grebe (búbos vöcsök), Podiceps cristatus
- Eared grebe (feketenyakú vöcsök), Podiceps nigricollis

== Pigeons and doves ==
Order: Columbiformes Family: Columbidae

Pigeons and doves are stout-bodied birds with short necks and short slender bills with a fleshy cere.

- Rock pigeon (parlagi galamb), Columba livia (I)
- Stock dove (kék galamb), Columba oenas
- Common wood-pigeon (örvös galamb), Columba palumbus
- European turtle-dove (vadgerle), Streptopelia turtur
- Oriental turtle-dove (keleti gerle), Streptopelia orientalis (A)
- Eurasian collared-dove (balkáni gerle), Streptopelia decaocto

== Sandgrouse ==
Order: Pterocliformes Family: Pteroclidae

Sandgrouse have small, pigeon-like heads and necks, but sturdy compact bodies. They have long pointed wings and sometimes tails and a fast direct flight. Flocks fly to watering holes at dawn and dusk. Their legs are feathered down to the toes.

- Pallas's sandgrouse (talpastyúk), Syrrhaptes paradoxus (A)
- Chestnut-bellied sandgrouse (barnahasú pusztaityúk), Pterocles exustus (A)

== Bustards ==
Order: Otidiformes Family: Otididae

Bustards are large terrestrial birds mainly associated with dry open country and steppes in the Old World. They are omnivorous and nest on the ground. They walk steadily on strong legs and big toes, pecking for food as they go. They have long broad wings with "fingered" wingtips and striking patterns in flight. Many have interesting mating displays.

- Great bustard (túzok), Otis tarda
- Little bustard (reznek), Tetrax tetrax (A)(extirpated)

== Cuckoos ==
Order: Cuculiformes Family: Cuculidae

The family Cuculidae includes cuckoos, roadrunners, and anis. These birds are of variable size with slender bodies, long tails, and strong legs. The Old World cuckoos are brood parasites.

- Great spotted cuckoo (pettyes kakukk), Clamator glandarius (A)
- Common cuckoo (kakukk), Cuculus canorus

== Nightjars ==
Order: Caprimulgiformes Family: Caprimulgidae

Nightjars are medium-sized nocturnal birds that usually nest on the ground. They have long wings, short legs, and very short bills. Most have small feet, of little use for walking, and long pointed wings. Their soft plumage is camouflaged to resemble bark or leaves.

- Eurasian nightjar (lappantyú), Caprimulgus europaeus

== Swifts ==
Order: Caprimulgiformes Family: Apodidae

Swifts are small birds which spend the majority of their lives flying. These birds have very short legs and never settle voluntarily on the ground, perching instead only on vertical surfaces. Many swifts have long swept-back wings which resemble a crescent or boomerang.

- Alpine swift (havasi sarlósfecske), Apus melba (A)
- Common swift (sarlósfecske), Apus apus
- Pallid swift (halvány sarlósfecske), Apus pallidus (A)

== Rails, gallinules, and coots ==
Order: Gruiformes Family: Rallidae

Rallidae is a large family of small to medium-sized birds which includes the rails, crakes, coots, and gallinules. Typically they inhabit dense vegetation in damp environments near lakes, swamps, or rivers. In general they are shy and secretive birds, making them difficult to observe. Most species have strong legs and long toes which are well adapted to soft uneven surfaces. They tend to have short, rounded wings and to be weak fliers.

- Water rail (guvat), Rallus aquaticus
- Corn crake (haris), Crex crex
- Spotted crake (pettyes vízicsibe), Porzana porzana
- Eurasian moorhen (vízityúk), Gallinula chloropus
- Eurasian coot (szárcsa), Fulica atra
- Western swamphen (kék fú), Porphyrio porphyrio (A)
- Little crake (kis vízicsibe), Zapornia parva
- Baillon's crake (törpevízicsibe), Zapornia pusilla

== Cranes ==
Order: Gruiformes Family: Gruidae

Cranes are large, long-legged, and long-necked birds. Unlike the similar-looking but unrelated herons, cranes fly with necks outstretched, not pulled back. Most have elaborate and noisy courting displays or "dances".,

- Demoiselle crane (pártásdaru), Anthropoides virgo (A)
- Common crane (daru), Grus grus

== Thick-knees ==
Order: Charadriiformes Family: Burhinidae

The thick-knees are a group waders found worldwide within the tropical zone, with some species also breeding in temperate Europe and Australia. They are medium to large birds with strong black or yellow-black bills, large yellow eyes, and cryptic plumage. Despite being classed as waders, most species have a preference for arid or semi-arid habitats.

- Eurasian thick-knee (ugartyúk), Burhinus oedicnemus

== Stilts and avocets ==
Order: Charadriiformes Family: Recurvirostridae

Recurvirostridae is a family of large wading birds which includes the avocets and stilts. The avocets have long legs and long up-curved bills. The stilts have extremely long legs and long, thin, straight bills.

- Black-winged stilt (gólyatöcs), Himantopus himantopus
- Pied avocet (gulipán), Recurvirostra avosetta

== Oystercatchers ==
Order: Charadriiformes Family: Haematopodidae

The oystercatchers are large and noisy plover-like birds with strong bills used for smashing or prising open molluscs.

- Eurasian oystercatcher (csigaforgató), Haematopus ostralegus

== Plovers and lapwings ==
Order: Charadriiformes Family: Charadriidae

The family Charadriidae includes the plovers, dotterels, and lapwings. They are small to medium-sized birds with compact bodies, short thick necks, and long, usually pointed, wings. They are found in open country worldwide, mostly in habitats near water

- Black-bellied plover (ezüstlile), Pluvialis squatarola
- European golden-plover (aranylile), Pluvialis apricaria
- American golden-plover (amerikai pettyeslile), Pluvialis dominicus (A)
- Pacific golden-plover (ázsiai pettyeslile), Pluvialis fulva (A)
- Spur-winged lapwing (tüskés bíbic), Vanellus spinosus (A)
- Northern lapwing (bíbic), Vanellus vanellus
- Sociable lapwing (lilebíbic), Vanellus gregarius (A)
- White-tailed lapwing (fehérfarkú lilebíbic), Vanellus leucurus (A)
- Greater sand-plover (sivatagi lile), Charadrius leschenaultii (A)
- Kentish plover (széki lile), Charadrius alexandrinus
- Common ringed plover (parti lile), Charadrius hiaticula
- Little ringed plover (kis lile), Charadrius dubius
- Killdeer (ékfarkú lile), Charadrius vociferus (A)
- Eurasian dotterel (havasi lile), Charadrius morinellus

== Sandpipers and allies ==
Order: Charadriiformes Family: Scolopacidae

Scolopacidae is a large diverse family of small to medium-sized shorebirds including the sandpipers, curlews, godwits, shanks, tattlers, woodcocks, snipes, dowitchers, and phalaropes. The majority of these species eat small invertebrates picked out of the mud or soil. Variation in length of legs and bills enables multiple species to feed in the same habitat, particularly on the coast, without direct competition for food.

- Upland sandpiper (hosszúfarkú cankó), Bartramia longicauda (A)
- Whimbrel (kis póling), Numenius phaeopus
- Slender-billed curlew (vékonycsőrű póling), Numenius tenuirostris (A)
- Eurasian curlew (nagy póling), Numenius arquata
- Bar-tailed godwit (kis goda), Limosa lapponica
- Black-tailed godwit (nagy goda), Limosa limosa
- Ruddy turnstone (kőforgató), Arenaria interpres
- Red knot (sarki partfutó), Calidris canutus
- Ruff (pajzsoscankó), Calidris pugnax
- Broad-billed sandpiper (sárjáró), Calidris falcinellus
- Stilt sandpiper (töcspartfutó), Calidris himantopus (A)
- Curlew sandpiper (sarlós partfutó), Calidris ferruginea
- Temminck's stint (temminck-partfutó), Calidris temminckii
- Sanderling (fenyérfutó), Calidris alba
- Dunlin (havasi partfutó), Calidris alpina
- Baird's sandpiper (baird-partfutó), Calidris bairdii (A)
- Little stint (apró partfutó), Calidris minuta
- White-rumped sandpiper (bonaparte-partfutó), Calidris fuscicollis (A)
- Buff-breasted sandpiper (cankópartfutó), Calidris subruficollis (A)
- Pectoral sandpiper (vándorpartfutó), Calidris melanotos (A)
- Semipalmated sandpiper (kis partfutó), Calidris pusilla (A)
- Long-billed dowitcher (hosszúcsőrű cankógoda), Limnodromus scolopaceus (A)
- Jack snipe (kis sárszalonka), Lymnocryptes minimus
- Eurasian woodcock (erdei szalonka), Scolopax rusticola
- Great snipe (nagy sárszalonka), Gallinago media
- Common snipe (sárszalonka), Gallinago gallinago
- Terek sandpiper (terekcankó), Xenus cinereus (A)
- Wilson's phalarope (wilson-víztaposó), Phalaropus tricolor (A)
- Red-necked phalarope (vékonycsőrű víztaposó), Phalaropus lobatus
- Red phalarope (laposcsőrű víztaposó), Phalaropus fulicarius (A)
- Common sandpiper (billegetőcankó), Actitis hypoleucos
- Green sandpiper (erdei cankó), Tringa ochropus
- Spotted redshank (füstös cankó), Tringa erythropus
- Common greenshank (szürke cankó), Tringa nebularia
- Lesser yellowlegs (sárgalábú cankó), Tringa flavipes (A)
- Marsh sandpiper (tavi cankó), Tringa stagnatilis
- Wood sandpiper (réti cankó), Tringa glareola
- Common redshank (piroslábú cankó), Tringa totanus

== Pratincoles and coursers ==
Order: Charadriiformes Family: Glareolidae

Glareolidae is a family of wading birds comprising the pratincoles, which have short legs, long pointed wings, and long forked tails, and the coursers, which have long legs, short wings, and long, pointed bills which curve downwards.

- Collared pratincole (székicsér), Glareola pratincola
- Black-winged pratincole (feketeszárnyú székicsér), Glareola nordmanni

== Skuas and jaegers ==
Order: Charadriiformes Family: Stercorariidae

The family Stercorariidae are, in general, medium to large birds, typically with grey or brown plumage, often with white markings on the wings. They nest on the ground in temperate and arctic regions and are long-distance migrants.

- Great skua (nagy halfarkas), Stercorarius skua (A)
- Pomarine jaeger (szélesfarkú halfarkas), Stercorarius pomarinus (A)
- Parasitic jaeger (ékfarkú halfarkas), Stercorarius parasiticus (A)
- Long-tailed jaeger (nyílfarkú halfarkas), Stercorarius longicaudus (A)

== Auks, murres, and puffins ==
Order: Charadriiformes Family: Alcidae

Alcids are superficially similar to penguins due to their black-and-white colours, their upright posture, and some of their habits; however they are not related to the penguins and differ in being able to fly. Auks live on the open sea, only deliberately coming ashore to nest.

- Razorbill (alka), Alca torda (A)
- Atlantic puffin (lunda), Fratercula arctica (A)

== Gulls, terns, and skimmers ==
Order: Charadriiformes Family: Laridae

Laridae is a family of medium to large seabirds, the gulls, terns, and skimmers. Gulls are typically grey or white, often with black markings on the head or wings. They have stout, longish bills and webbed feet. Terns are a group of generally medium to large seabirds typically with grey or white plumage, often with black markings on the head. Most terns hunt fish by diving but some pick insects off the surface of fresh water. Terns are generally long-lived birds, with several species known to live in excess of 30 years.

- Black-legged kittiwake (csüllő), Rissa tridactyla (A)
- Sabine's gull (fecskesirály), Xema sabini (A)
- Slender-billed gull (vékonycsőrű sirály), Chroicocephalus genei (A)
- Black-headed gull (dankasirály), Chroicocephalus ridibundus
- Little gull (kis sirály), Hydrocoloeus minutus
- Franklin's gull (prérisirály), Leucophaeus pipixcan (A)
- Mediterranean gull (szerecsensirály), Ichthyaetus melanocephalus
- Pallas's gull (halászsirály), Ichthyaetus ichthyaetus (A)
- Common gull (viharsirály), Larus canus
- Ring-billed gull (gyűrűscsőrű sirály), Larus delawarensis (A)
- Herring gull (ezüstsirály), Larus argentatus
- Yellow-legged gull (sárgalábú sirály), Larus michahellis
- Caspian gull (sztyeppi sirály), Larus cachinnans
- Lesser black-backed gull (heringsirály), Larus fuscus
- Glaucous gull (jeges sirály), Larus hyperboreus (A)
- Great black-backed gull (dolmányos sirály), Larus marinus (A)
- Little tern (kis csér), Sternula albifrons
- Gull-billed tern (kacagócsér), Gelochelidon nilotica
- Caspian tern (lócsér), Hydroprogne caspia
- Black tern (kormos szerkő), Chlidonias niger
- White-winged tern (fehérszárnyú szerkő), Chlidonias leucopterus
- Whiskered tern (fattyúszerkő), Chlidonias hybrida
- Common tern (küszvágó csér), Sterna hirundo
- Arctic tern (sarki csér), Sterna paradisaea (A)
- Sandwich tern (kenti csér), Thalasseus sandvicensis (A)

== Loons ==
Order: Gaviiformes Family: Gaviidae

Loons, known as divers in Europe, are a group of aquatic birds found in many parts of North America and northern Europe. They are the size of a large duck or small goose, which they somewhat resemble when swimming, but to which they are completely unrelated.

- Red-throated loon (északi búvár), Gavia stellata
- Arctic loon (sarki búvár), Gavia arctica
- Common loon (jeges búvár), Gavia immer (A)

== Storks ==
Order: Ciconiiformes Family: Ciconiidae

Storks are large, long-legged, long-necked, wading birds with long, stout bills. Storks are mute, but bill-clattering is an important mode of communication at the nest. Their nests can be large and may be reused for many years. Many species are migratory.

- Black stork (fekete gólya), Ciconia nigra
- White stork (fehér gólya), Ciconia ciconia
- Marabou stork (afrikai marabu), Leptoptilos crumeniferus (A)

== Cormorants and shags ==
Order: Suliformes Family: Phalacrocoracidae

Phalacrocoracidae is a family of medium to large coastal, fish-eating seabirds that includes cormorants and shags. Plumage colouration varies, with the majority having mainly dark plumage, some species being black-and-white, and a few being colourful.

- Pygmy cormorant (kis kárókatona), Microcarbo pygmeus
- Great cormorant (kárókatona), Phalacrocorax carbo

== Pelicans ==
Order: Pelecaniformes Family: Pelecanidae

Pelicans are large water birds with a distinctive pouch under their beak. They have webbed feet with four toes.

- Great white pelican (rózsás gödény), Pelecanus onocrotalus (A)
- Dalmatian pelican (borzas gödény), Pelecanus crispus (A) (extirpated)

== Herons, egrets, and bitterns ==
Order: Pelecaniformes Family: Ardeidae

The family Ardeidae contains the bitterns, herons, and egrets. Herons and egrets are medium to large wading birds with long necks and legs. Bitterns tend to be shorter necked and more wary. Members of Ardeidae fly with their necks retracted, unlike other long-necked birds such as storks, ibises, and spoonbills.

- Great bittern (bölömbika), Botaurus stellaris
- Little bittern (törpegém), Ixobrychus minutus
- Gray heron (szürke gém), Ardea cinerea
- Purple heron (vörös gém), Ardea purpurea
- Great egret (nagy kócsag), Ardea alba
- Western reef-heron (zátonykócsag), Egretta gularis
- Little egret (kis kócsag), Egretta garzetta
- Cattle egret (pásztorgém), Bubulcus ibis
- Squacco heron (üstökösgém), Ardeola ralloides
- Chinese pond-heron (kínai üstökösgém), Ardeola bacchus (A)
- Black-crowned night-heron (bakcsó), Nycticorax nycticorax

== Ibises and spoonbills ==
Order: Pelecaniformes Family: Threskiornithidae

Threskiornithidae is a family of large terrestrial and wading birds which includes the ibises and spoonbills. They have long, broad wings with 11 primary and about 20 secondary feathers. They are strong fliers and despite their size and weight, very capable soarers.

- Glossy ibis (batla), Plegadis falcinellus
- Eurasian spoonbill (kanalasgém), Platalea leucorodia

== Osprey ==
Order: Accipitriformes Family: Pandionidae

The family Pandionidae contains only one species, the osprey. The osprey is a medium-large raptor which is a specialist fish-eater with a worldwide distribution.

- Osprey (halászsas), Pandion haliaetus

== Hawks, eagles, and kites ==
Order: Accipitriformes Family: Accipitridae

Accipitridae is a family of birds of prey which includes hawks, eagles, kites, harriers, and Old World vultures. These birds have powerful hooked beaks for tearing flesh from their prey, strong legs, powerful talons, and keen eyesight.

- Egyptian vulture (dögkeselyű), Neophron percnopterus (A)
- European honey-buzzard (darázsölyv), Pernis apivorus
- Cinereous vulture (barátkeselyű), Aegypius monachus
- Eurasian griffon (fakó keselyű), Gyps fulvus (A)
- Short-toed snake-eagle (kígyászölyv), Circaetus gallicus
- Lesser spotted eagle (békászó sas), Clanga pomarina
- Greater spotted eagle (fekete sas), Clanga clanga (A)
- Booted eagle (törpesas), Hieraaetus pennatus
- Steppe eagle (pusztai sas), Aquila nipalensis (A)
- Imperial eagle (parlagi sas), Aquila heliaca
- Golden eagle (szirti sas), Aquila chrysaetos
- Bonelli's eagle (héjasas), Aquila fasciata (A)
- Eurasian marsh-harrier (barna rétihéja), Circus aeruginosus
- Hen harrier (kékes rétihéja), Circus cyaneus
- Pallid harrier (fakó rétihéja), Circus macrourus (A)
- Montagu's harrier (hamvas rétihéja), Circus pygargus
- Levant sparrowhawk (kis héja), Accipiter brevipes
- Eurasian sparrowhawk (karvaly), Accipiter nisus
- Northern goshawk (héja), Accipiter gentilis
- Red kite (vörös kánya), Milvus milvus
- Black kite (barna kánya), Milvus migrans
- White-tailed eagle (rétisas), Haliaeetus albicilla
- Rough-legged hawk (gatyás ölyv), Buteo lagopus
- Common buzzard (egerészölyv), Buteo buteo
- Long-legged buzzard (pusztai ölyv), Buteo rufinus

== Barn-owls ==
Order: Strigiformes Family: Tytonidae

Barn-owls are medium to large owls with large heads and characteristic heart-shaped faces. They have long strong legs with powerful talons.

- Western barn owl (gyöngybagoly), Tyto alba

== Owls ==
Order: Strigiformes Family: Strigidae

The typical owls are small to large solitary nocturnal birds of prey. They have large forward-facing eyes and ears, a hawk-like beak, and a conspicuous circle of feathers around each eye called a facial disk.

- Eurasian scops-owl (füleskuvik), Otus scops
- Eurasian eagle-owl (uhu), Bubo bubo
- Snowy owl (hóbagoly), Bubo scandiacus (A)
- Northern hawk owl (karvalybagoly), Surnia ulula (A)
- Eurasian pygmy-owl (törpekuvik), Glaucidium passerinum (A)
- Little owl (kuvik), Athene noctua
- Tawny owl (macskabagoly), Strix aluco
- Ural owl (uráli bagoly), Strix uralensis
- Long-eared owl (erdei fülesbagoly), Asio otus
- Short-eared owl (réti fülesbagoly), Asio flammeus
- Boreal owl (gatyáskuvik), Aegolius funereus

== Hoopoes ==
Order: Bucerotiformes Family: Upupidae

Hoopoes have black, white, and orangey-pink colouring with a large erectile crest on their head.

- Eurasian hoopoe (búbosbanka), Upupa epops

== Kingfishers ==
Order: Coraciiformes Family: Alcedinidae

Kingfishers are medium-sized birds with large heads, long pointed bills, short legs, and stubby tails.

- Common kingfisher (jégmadár), Alcedo atthis

== Bee-eaters ==
Order: Coraciiformes Family: Meropidae

The bee-eaters are a group of coraciiform birds. Most species are found in Africa but others occur in southern Europe, Madagascar, Australia, and New Guinea. They are characterised by richly coloured plumage, slender bodies, and usually elongated central tail feathers. All are colourful and have long downturned bills and pointed wings, which give them a swallow-like appearance when seen from afar.

- European bee-eater (gyurgyalag), Merops apiaster

== Rollers ==
Order: Coraciiformes Family: Coraciidae

Rollers resemble crows in size and build, but are more closely related to the kingfishers and bee-eaters. They share the colourful appearance of those groups with blues and browns predominating. The two inner front toes are connected, but the outer toe is not.

- European roller (szalakóta), Coracias garrulus

== Woodpeckers ==
Order: Piciformes Family: Picidae

Woodpeckers are small to medium-sized birds with chisel-like beaks, short legs, stiff tails, and long tongues used for capturing insects. Some species have feet with two toes pointing forward and two backward, while several species have only three toes. Many woodpeckers have the habit of drumming on tree trunks with their beaks.

- Eurasian wryneck (nyaktekercs), Jynx torquilla
- Middle spotted woodpecker (közép fakopáncs), Dendrocoptes medius
- White-backed woodpecker (fehérhátú fakopáncs), Dendrocopos leucotos
- Great spotted woodpecker (nagy fakopáncs), Dendrocopos major
- Syrian woodpecker (balkáni fakopáncs), Dendrocopos syriacus
- Lesser spotted woodpecker (kis fakopáncs), Dryobates minor
- Eurasian green woodpecker (zöld küllő), Picus viridis
- Gray-headed woodpecker (hamvas küllő), Picus canus
- Black woodpecker (fekete harkály), Dryocopus martius

== Falcons and caracaras ==
Order: Falconiformes Family: Falconidae

Falconidae is a family of diurnal birds of prey. They differ from hawks, eagles, and kites in that they kill with their beaks instead of their talons.

- Lesser kestrel (fehérkarmú vércse), Falco naumanni (A)
- Eurasian kestrel (vörös vércse), Falco tinnunculus
- Red-footed falcon (kék vércse), Falco vespertinus
- Amur falcon (amuri vércse), Falco amurensis (A)
- Eleonora's falcon (eleonóra-sólyom), Falco eleonorae (A)
- Merlin (kis sólyom), Falco columbarius
- Eurasian hobby (kabasólyom), Falco subbuteo
- Saker falcon (kerecsensólyom), Falco cherrug
- Peregrine falcon (vándorsólyom), Falco peregrinus

== Old World orioles ==
Order: Passeriformes Family: Oriolidae

The Old World orioles are colourful passerine birds which are not related to the similar-appearing New World orioles.

- Eurasian golden oriole (sárgarigó), Oriolus oriolus

== Shrikes ==
Order: Passeriformes Family: Laniidae

Shrikes are passerine birds known for their habit of catching other birds and small animals and impaling the uneaten portions of their bodies on thorns. A shrike's beak is hooked, like that of a typical bird of prey.

- Red-backed shrike (tövisszúró gébics), Lanius collurio
- Great gray shrike (nagy őrgébics), Lanius excubitor
- Lesser gray shrike (kis őrgébics), Lanius minor
- Woodchat shrike (vörösfejű gébics), Lanius senator (A)

== Crows, jays, and magpies ==
Order: Passeriformes Family: Corvidae

The family Corvidae includes crows, ravens, jays, choughs, magpies, treepies, nutcrackers, and ground jays. Corvids are above average in size among the Passeriformes, and some of the larger species show high levels of intelligence.

- Eurasian jay (szajkó), Garrulus glandarius
- Eurasian magpie (szarka), Pica pica
- Eurasian nutcracker (fenyőszajkó), Nucifraga caryocatactes
- Red-billed chough (havasi varjú), Pyrrhocorax pyrrhocorax (A)
- Yellow-billed chough (havasi csóka), Pyrrhocorax graculus (A)
- Eurasian jackdaw (csóka), Corvus monedula
- Rook (vetési varjú), Corvus frugilegus
- Carrion crow (kormos varjú), Corvus corone
- Hooded crow (dolmányos varjú), Corvus cornix
- Common raven (holló), Corvus corax

== Tits, chickadees, and titmice ==
Order: Passeriformes Family: Paridae

The Paridae are mainly small stocky woodland species with short stout bills. Some have crests. They are adaptable birds, with a mixed diet including seeds and insects.

- Coal tit (fenyvescinege), Periparus ater
- Crested tit (búbos cinege), Lophophanes cristatus
- Marsh tit (barátcinege), Poecile palustris
- Willow tit (kormosfejű cinege), Poecile montana
- Eurasian blue tit (kék cinege), Cyanistes caeruleus
- Great tit (széncinege), Parus major

== Penduline-tits ==
Order: Passeriformes Family: Remizidae

The penduline-tits are a group of small passerine birds related to the true tits. They are insectivores.

- Eurasian penduline tit (függőcinege), Remiz pendulinus

== Larks ==
Order: Passeriformes Family: Alaudidae

Larks are small terrestrial birds with often extravagant songs and display flights. Most larks are fairly dull in appearance. Their food is insects and seeds.

- Horned lark (havasi fülespacsirta), Eremophila alpestris
- Greater short-toed lark (szikipacsirta), Calandrella brachydactyla
- Calandra lark (kalandrapacsirta), Melanocorypha calandra (A)
- Wood lark (erdei pacsirta), Lullula arborea
- Eurasian skylark (mezei pacsirta), Alauda arvensis
- Crested lark (búbospacsirta), Galerida cristata

== Bearded reedling ==
Order: Passeriformes Family: Panuridae

This species, the only one in its family, is found in reed beds throughout temperate Europe and Asia.

- Bearded reedling (barkóscinege), Panurus biarmicus

== Cisticolas ==
Order: Passeriformes Family: Cisticolidae

The Cisticolidae are warblers found mainly in warmer southern regions of the Old World. They are generally very small birds of drab brown or grey appearance found in open country such as grassland or scrub.

- Zitting cisticola (szuharbújó), Cisticola juncidis (A)

== Reed warblers and allies ==
Order: Passeriformes Family: Acrocephalidae

The members of this family are usually rather large for "warblers". Most are rather plain olivaceous brown above with much yellow to beige below. They are usually found in open woodland, reedbeds, or tall grass. The family occurs mostly in southern to western Eurasia and surroundings, but it also ranges far into the Pacific, with some species in Africa.

- Eastern olivaceous warbler (halvány geze), Iduna pallida
- Icterine warbler (kerti geze), Hippolais icterina
- Aquatic warbler (csíkosfejű nádiposzáta), Acrocephalus paludicola
- Moustached warbler (fülemülesitke), Acrocephalus melanopogon
- Sedge warbler (foltos nádiposzáta), Acrocephalus schoenobaenus
- Paddyfield warbler (rozsdás nádiposzáta), Acrocephalus agricola (A)
- Marsh warbler (énekes nádiposzáta), Acrocephalus palustris
- Eurasian reed warbler (cserregő nádiposzáta), Acrocephalus scirpaceus
- Great reed warbler (nádirigó), Acrocephalus arundinaceus

== Grassbirds and allies ==
Order: Passeriformes Family: Locustellidae

Locustellidae are a family of small insectivorous songbirds found mainly in Eurasia, Africa, and the Australian region. They are smallish birds with tails that are usually long and pointed, and tend to be drab brownish or buffy all over.

- River warbler (berki tücsökmadár), Locustella fluviatilis
- Savi's warbler (nádi tücsökmadár), Locustella luscinioides
- Common grasshopper-warbler (réti tücsökmadár), Locustella naevia

== Swallows ==
Order: Passeriformes Family: Hirundinidae

The family Hirundinidae is adapted to aerial feeding. They have a slender streamlined body, long pointed wings, and a short bill with a wide gape. The feet are adapted to perching rather than walking, and the front toes are partially joined at the base.

- Bank swallow (partifecske), Riparia riparia
- Barn swallow (füsti fecske), Hirundo rustica
- Red-rumped swallow (vörhenyes fecske), Cecropis daurica (A)
- Common house-martin (molnárfecske), Delichon urbicum

== Leaf warblers ==
Order: Passeriformes Family: Phylloscopidae

Leaf warblers are a family of small insectivorous birds found mostly in Eurasia and ranging into Wallacea and Africa. The species are of various sizes, often green-plumaged above and yellow below, or more subdued with greyish-green to greyish-brown colours.

- Wood warbler (sisegő füzike), Phylloscopus sibilatrix
- Western Bonelli's warbler (bonelli-füzike), Phylloscopus bonelli (A)
- Yellow-browed warbler (vándorfüzike), Phylloscopus inornatus (A)
- Hume's warbler (himalájai füzike), Phylloscopus humei (A)
- Pallas's leaf warbler (királyfüzike), Phylloscopus proregulus (A)
- Radde's warbler (vastagcsőrű füzike), Phylloscopus schwarzi (A)
- Dusky warbler (barna füzike), Phylloscopus fuscatus (A)
- Willow warbler (fitiszfüzike), Phylloscopus trochilus
- Common chiffchaff (csilpcsalpfüzike), Phylloscopus collybita

== Bush warblers and allies ==
Order: Passeriformes Family: Scotocercidae

The members of this family are found mostly in Africa and Asia with a few species in Europe and Polynesia.

- Cetti's warbler (berki poszáta), Cettia cetti

== Long-tailed tits ==
Order: Passeriformes Family: Aegithalidae

Long-tailed tits are a group of small passerine birds with medium to long tails. They make woven bag nests in trees. Most eat a mixed diet which includes insects.

- Long-tailed tit (őszapó), Aegithalos caudatus

== Sylviid warblers, parrotbills, and allies ==
Order: Passeriformes Family: Sylviidae

The family Sylviidae is a group of small insectivorous passerine birds. They mainly occur as breeding species, as the common name implies, in Europe, Asia and, to a lesser extent, Africa. Most are of generally undistinguished appearance, but many have distinctive songs.

- Eurasian blackcap (barátposzáta), Sylvia atricapilla
- Garden warbler (kerti poszáta), Sylvia borin
- Barred warbler (karvalyposzáta), Curruca nisoria
- Lesser whitethroat (kis poszáta), Curruca curruca
- Eastern subalpine warbler (bajszos poszáta), Curruca cantillans (A)
- Sardinian warbler (kucsmás poszáta), Curruca melanocephala (A)
- Greater whitethroat (mezei poszáta), Curruca communis

== Kinglets ==
Order: Passeriformes Family: Regulidae

The kinglets and "crests" are a small family of birds which resemble some warblers. They are very small insectivorous birds in the single genus Regulus. The adults have colored crowns, giving rise to their name.

- Goldcrest (sárgafejű királyka), Regulus regulus
- Common firecrest (tüzesfejű királyka), Regulus ignicapillus

== Wallcreeper ==
Order: Passeriformes Family: Tichodromidae

The wallcreeper is a small bird related to the nuthatch family, which has stunning crimson, grey, and black plumage.

- Wallcreeper (hajnalmadár), Tichodroma muraria

== Nuthatches ==
Order: Passeriformes Family: Sittidae

Nuthatches are small woodland birds. They have the unusual ability to climb down trees head first, unlike other birds which can only go upwards. Nuthatches have big heads, short tails, and powerful bills and feet.

- Eurasian nuthatch (csuszka), Sitta europaea

== Treecreepers ==
Order: Passeriformes Family: Certhiidae

Treecreepers are small woodland birds, brown above and white below. They have thin pointed down-curved bills, which they use to extricate insects from bark. They have stiff tail feathers, like woodpeckers, which they use to support themselves on vertical trees.

- Eurasian treecreeper (hegyi fakusz), Certhia familiaris
- Short-toed treecreeper (rövidkarmú fakusz), Certhia brachydactyla

== Wrens ==
Order: Passeriformes Family: Troglodytidae

The wrens are mainly small and inconspicuous except for their loud songs. These birds have short wings and thin down-turned bills. Several species often hold their tails upright. All are insectivorous.

- Eurasian wren (ökörszem), Troglodytes troglodytes

== Dippers ==
Order: Passeriformes Family: Cinclidae

Dippers are a group of perching birds whose habitat includes aquatic environments in the Americas, Europe, and Asia. They are named for their bobbing or dipping movements.

- White-throated dipper (vízirigó), Cinclus cinclus

== Starlings ==
Order: Passeriformes Family: Sturnidae

Starlings are small to medium-sized passerine birds. Their flight is strong and direct and they are very gregarious. Their preferred habitat is fairly open country. They eat insects and fruit. Plumage is typically dark with a metallic sheen.

- Rosy starling (pásztormadár), Pastor roseus
- European starling (seregély), Sturnus vulgaris

== Thrushes and allies ==
Order: Passeriformes Family: Turdidae

The thrushes are a group of passerine birds that occur mainly in the Old World. They are plump, soft plumaged, small to medium-sized insectivores or sometimes omnivores, often feeding on the ground. Many have attractive songs.

- Mistle thrush (léprigó), Turdus viscivorus
- Song thrush (énekes rigó), Turdus philomelos
- Redwing (szőlőrigó), Turdus iliacus
- Eurasian blackbird (fekete rigó), Turdus merula
- Fieldfare (fenyőrigó), Turdus pilaris
- Ring ouzel (örvös rigó), Turdus torquatus

== Old World flycatchers ==
Order: Passeriformes Family: Muscicapidae

Old World flycatchers are a large group of small passerine birds native to the Old World. They are mainly small arboreal insectivores. The appearance of these birds is highly varied, but they mostly have weak songs and harsh calls.

- Spotted flycatcher (szürke légykapó), Muscicapa striata
- European robin (vörösbegy), Erithacus rubecula
- Thrush nightingale (nagy fülemüle), Luscinia luscinia
- Common nightingale (fülemüle), Luscinia megarhynchos
- Bluethroat (kékbegy), Luscinia svecica
- Red-breasted flycatcher (kis légykapó), Ficedula parva
- European pied flycatcher (kormos légykapó), Ficedula hypoleuca
- Collared flycatcher (örvös légykapó), Ficedula albicollis
- Common redstart (kerti rozsdafarkú), Phoenicurus phoenicurus
- Black redstart (házi rozsdafarkú), Phoenicurus ochruros
- Rufous-tailed rock-thrush (kövirigó), Monticola saxatilis
- Blue rock-thrush (kék kövirigó), Monticola solitarius (A)
- Whinchat (rozsdás csuk), Saxicola rubetra
- European stonechat (cigánycsuk), Saxicola rubicola
- Northern wheatear (hantmadár), Oenanthe oenanthe
- Isabelline wheatear (pusztai hantmadár), Oenanthe isabellina (A)
- Desert wheatear (sivatagi hantmadár), Oenanthe deserti (A)
- Pied wheatear (apácahantmadár), Oenanthe pleschanka (A)
- Eastern black-eared wheatear (déli hantmadár), Oenanthe melanoleuca (A)

== Waxwings ==
Order: Passeriformes Family: Bombycillidae

The waxwings are a group of birds with soft silky plumage and unique red tips to some of the wing feathers. In the Bohemian and cedar waxwings, these tips look like sealing wax and give the group its name. These are arboreal birds of northern forests. They live on insects in summer and berries in winter.

- Bohemian waxwing (csonttollú), Bombycilla garrulus

== Accentors ==
Order: Passeriformes Family: Prunellidae

The accentors are in the only bird family, Prunellidae, which is completely endemic to the Palearctic. They are small, fairly drab species superficially similar to sparrows.

- Alpine accentor (havasi szürkebegy), Prunella collaris
- Dunnock (erdei szürkebegy), Prunella modularis

== Old World sparrows ==
Order: Passeriformes Family: Passeridae

Old World sparrows are small passerine birds. In general, sparrows tend to be small, plump, brown or grey birds with short tails and short powerful beaks. Sparrows are seed eaters, but they also consume small insects.

- House sparrow (házi veréb), Passer domesticus
- Eurasian tree sparrow (mezei veréb), Passer montanus

== Wagtails and pipits ==
Order: Passeriformes Family: Motacillidae

Motacillidae is a family of small passerine birds with medium to long tails. They include the wagtails, longclaws, and pipits. They are slender ground-feeding insectivores of open country.

- Gray wagtail (hegyi billegető), Motacilla cinerea
- Western yellow wagtail (sárga billegető), Motacilla flava
- Citrine wagtail (citrombillegető), Motacilla citreola (A)
- White wagtail (barázdabillegető), Motacilla alba
- Richard's pipit (sarkantyús pityer), Anthus richardi (A)
- Tawny pipit (parlagi pityer), Anthus campestris
- Meadow pipit (réti pityer), Anthus pratensis
- Tree pipit (erdei pityer), Anthus trivialis
- Red-throated pipit (rozsdástorkú pityer), Anthus cervinus
- Water pipit (havasi pityer), Anthus spinoletta

== Finches, euphonias, and allies ==
Order: Passeriformes Family: Fringillidae

Finches are seed-eating passerine birds that are small to moderately large and have a strong beak, usually conical and in some species very large. All have twelve tail feathers and nine primaries. These birds have a bouncing flight with alternating bouts of flapping and gliding on closed wings, and most sing well.

- Common chaffinch (erdei pinty), Fringilla coelebs
- Brambling (fenyőpinty), Fringilla montifringilla
- Hawfinch (meggyvágó), Coccothraustes coccothraustes
- Common rosefinch (karmazsinpirók), Carpodacus erythrinus (A)
- Pallas's rosefinch (rózsás pirók), Carpodacus roseus (A)
- Pine grosbeak (nagy pirók), Pinicola enucleator (A)
- Eurasian bullfinch (süvöltő), Pyrrhula pyrrhula
- European greenfinch (zöldike), Chloris chloris
- Twite (sárgacsőrű kenderike), Linaria flavirostris
- Eurasian linnet (kenderike), Linaria cannabina
- Common redpoll (zsezse), Acanthis flammea
- Hoary redpoll (szürke zsezse), Acanthis hornemanni (A)
- Red crossbill (keresztcsőrű), Loxia curvirostra
- White-winged crossbill (szalagos keresztcsőrű), Loxia leucoptera (A)
- European goldfinch (tengelic), Carduelis carduelis
- European serin (csicsörke), Serinus serinus
- Eurasian siskin (csíz), Spinus spinus

== Longspurs and snow buntings ==
Order: Passeriformes Family: Calcariidae

The Calcariidae are a family of birds that had been traditionally grouped with the New World sparrows, but differ in a number of respects and are usually found in open grassy areas.

- Lapland longspur (sarkantyús sármány), Calcarius lapponicus
- Snow bunting (hósármány), Plectrophenax nivalis

== Old World buntings ==
Order: Passeriformes Family: Emberizidae

The emberizids are a large family of seed-eating birds with distinctively shaped bills. Many emberizid species have distinctive head patterns.

- Black-headed bunting (kucsmás sármány), Emberiza melanocephala (A)
- Corn bunting (sordély), Emberiza calandra
- Rock bunting (bajszos sármány), Emberiza cia
- Cirl bunting (sövénysármány), Emberiza cirlus
- Yellowhammer (citromsármány), Emberiza citrinella
- Pine bunting (fenyősármány), Emberiza leucocephalos (A)
- Ortolan bunting (kerti sármány), Emberiza hortulana
- Reed bunting (nádi sármány), Emberiza schoeniclus
- Little bunting (törpesármány), Emberiza pusilla (A)

== See also ==
- List of birds
- Lists of birds by region
