= Bird Island (Marin County, California) =

Island in Marin County, California, U.S.

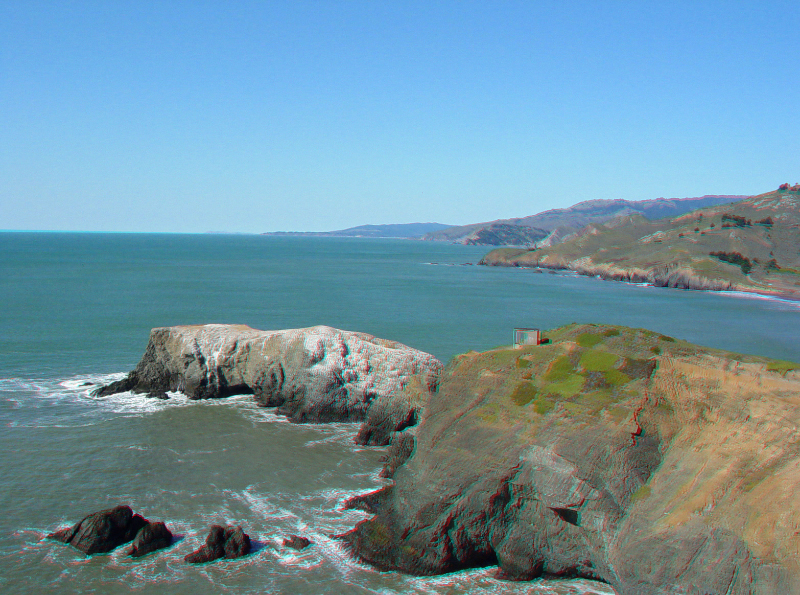
- Anaglyphic photograph of Bird Island

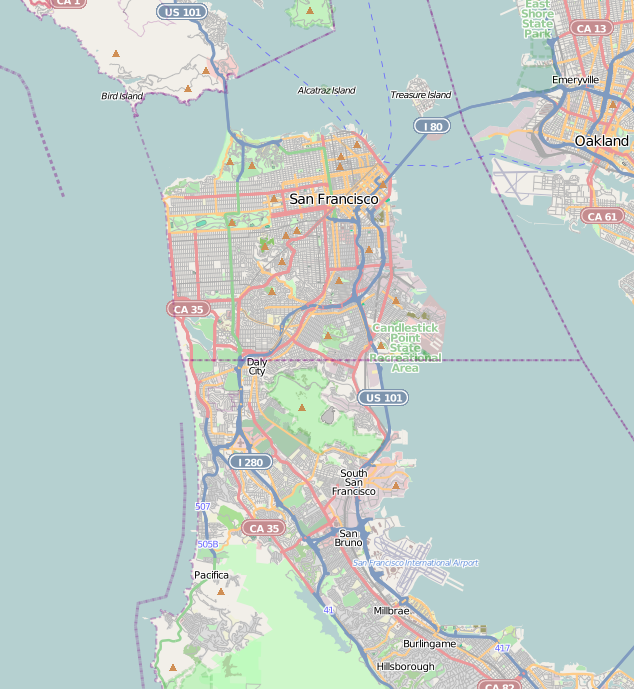
- Location within San Francisco Location within San Francisco Bay Area Location within California Location within the United States

Geography
- Location: Northern California
- Coordinates: 37°49′27″N 122°32′12″W
- Adjacent to: San Francisco Bay

Administration
- United States
- State: California
- County: Marin

Bird Island is a small island between Point Bonita and Rodeo Cove in southern Marin County, California. It is located off the coast of Marin Headlands, about three miles from San Francisco.

== See also ==
- Bird Rock (Marin County, California)
- List of islands of California
