= Bird Island (Southland) =

Island in New Zealand

Geography
- Coordinates: 46.768583°S 168.424194°E

Administration
- New Zealand
- Region: Southland

Demographics
- Population: uninhabited

Bird Island, or Motuhara, or Motuharo is an island in the Foveaux Strait of New Zealand. It is west of Ruapuke Island.

== See also ==
- List of islands of New Zealand
