= Bird Island (San Mateo County, California) =

Island in California

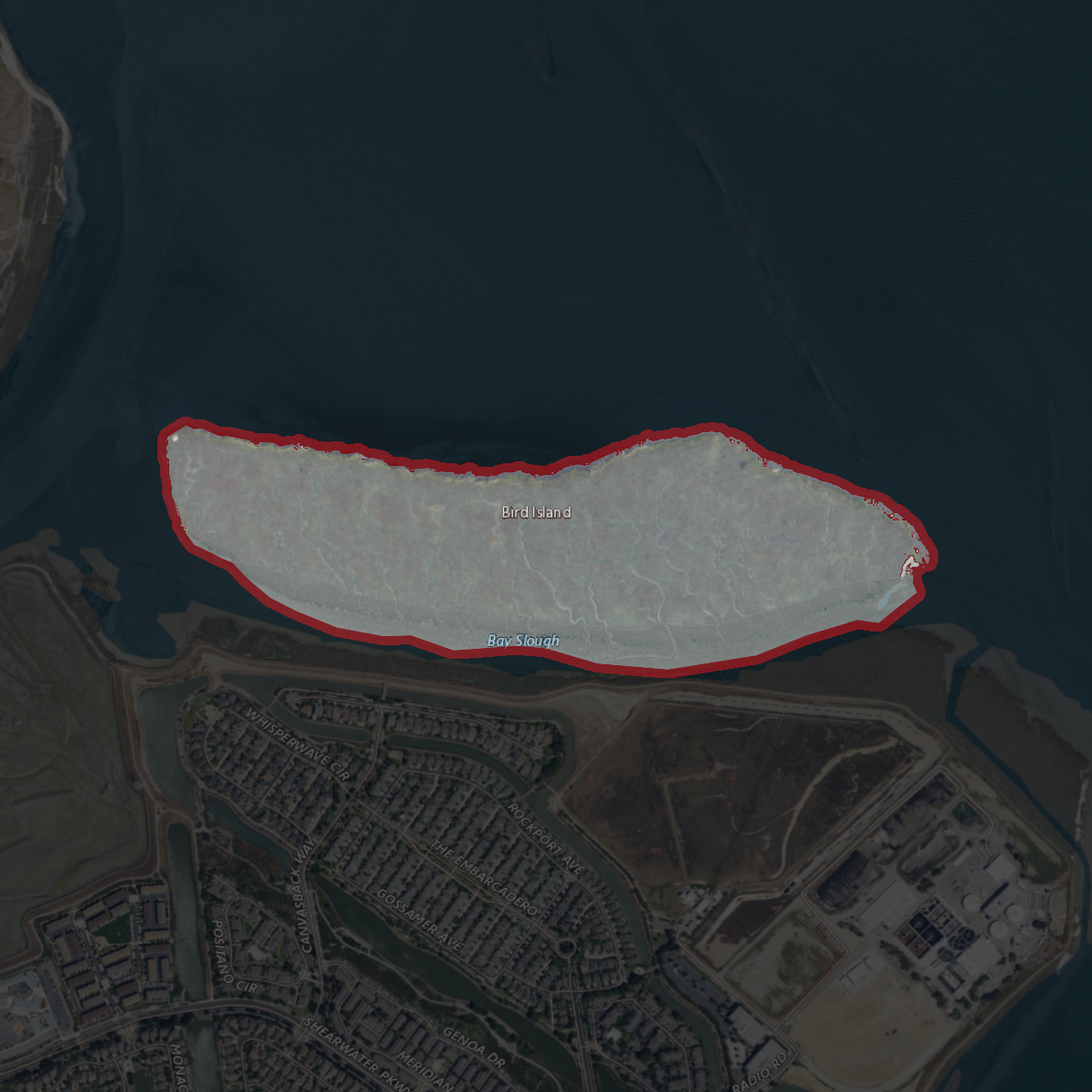
- USGS aerial imagery of Bird Island

- Location within San Francisco Bay Area Location within California Location within the United States

Geography
- Location: Northern California
- Coordinates: 37°33′04″N 122°14′13″W
- Adjacent to: San Francisco Bay
- Highest elevation: 7 ft (2.1 m)

Administration
- United States
- State: California
- County: San Mateo

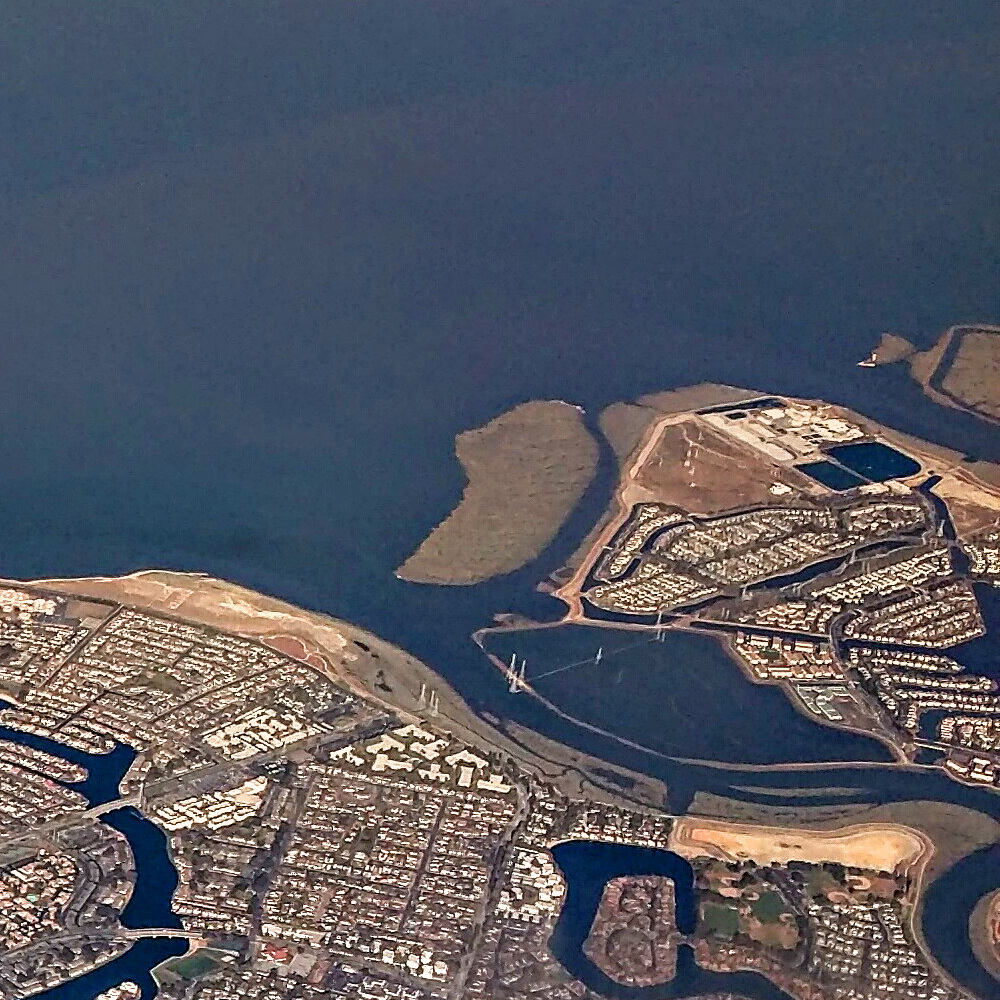
Bird Island in a 2015 aerial photo

Bird Island is an island in San Francisco Bay. It is in San Mateo County, California. Its coordinates are 37°33′04″N 122°14′13″W, and the United States Geological Survey gave its elevation as 7 ft (2.1 m) in 1998. It appears on a 2012 USGS map of the area.
