= Bird Island (Juneau, Alaska) =

Island in Alaska, United States

- Interactive map of Bird Island

Geography
- Location: Juneau City and Borough, Alaska
- Coordinates: 58°29′25″N 134°50′53″W
- Archipelago: Alexander Archipelago
- Width: 0.1 mi (0.2 km)
- Highest elevation: 0 ft (0 m)

Administration
- United States
- State: Alaska
- Borough: Juneau

Bird Island (or Bird Islet) is an island in the City and Borough of Juneau, Alaska, United States. It was named by Captain Lester A. Beardslee of the United States Navy in 1880. Located off the eastern shore of Favorite Channel, it is 2.4 miles (3.9 km) northwest of Pearl Harbor and 20 miles (32 km) northwest of the city of Juneau. The name was first published by the United States Coast and Geodetic Survey in 1883.

The island is 0.1 miles (0.16 km) across.

== See also ==
- Dobson Landing, Alaska
