= Bird Island (Marlborough) =

Island in New Zealand

Geography
- Coordinates: 40.99225°S 174.034194°E

Administration
- New Zealand
- Region: Marlborough

Demographics
- Population: uninhabited

Bird Island is an island in the Forsyth Bay in the Marlborough District of New Zealand's South Island.

== See also ==
- List of islands of New Zealand
