= List of reptiles of Hungary =

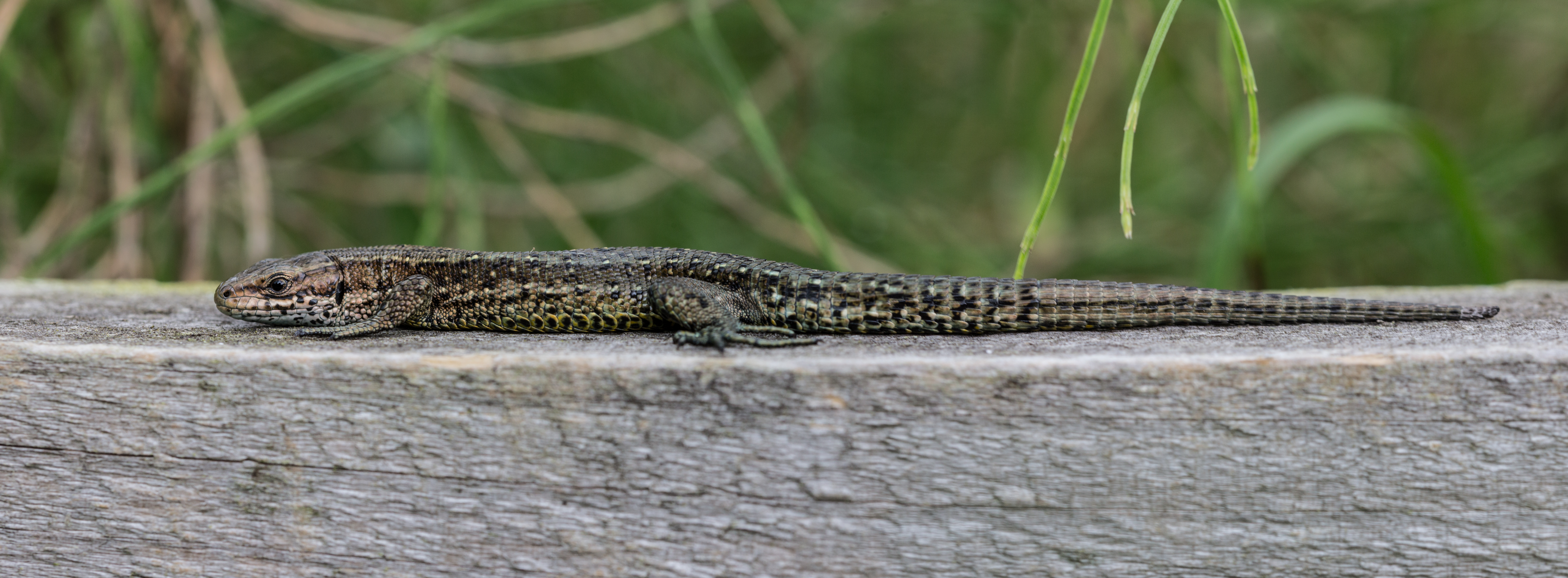
A viviparous lizard (Zootoca vivipara)

This is a list of reptiles of Hungary. There is a total of 19 native and introduced species.

== Lacertilia (lizards) ==
- Anguis colchica – eastern slowworm
- Anguis fragilis – common slowworm LC
- Ablepharus kitaibelii – European copper skink, European snake-eyed skink LC
- Lacerta agilis – sand lizard LC
- Lacerta viridis – European green lizard LC
- Mediodactylus kotschyi – Kotschy's gecko (probably introduced)
- Podarcis muralis – common wall lizard LC
- Podarcis tauricus – Balkan wall lizard LC
- Zootoca vivipara – viviparous lizard, common lizard LC

== Serpentes (snakes) ==
- Coronella austriaca – smooth snake LC
- Dolichophis caspius – Caspian whipsnake
- Natrix natrix – grass snake LC
- Natrix tessellata – dice snake LC
- Vipera berus – common European adder, common European viper LC
- Vipera ursinii rakosiensis – Hungarian meadow viper EN
- Zamenis longissimus – Aesculapian snake LC

== Emydidae (pond turtles) ==
- Emys orbicularis – European pond turtle NT
- Trachemys scripta – pond slider (introduced)
