= Bird Island (Otago) =

Island in New Zealand

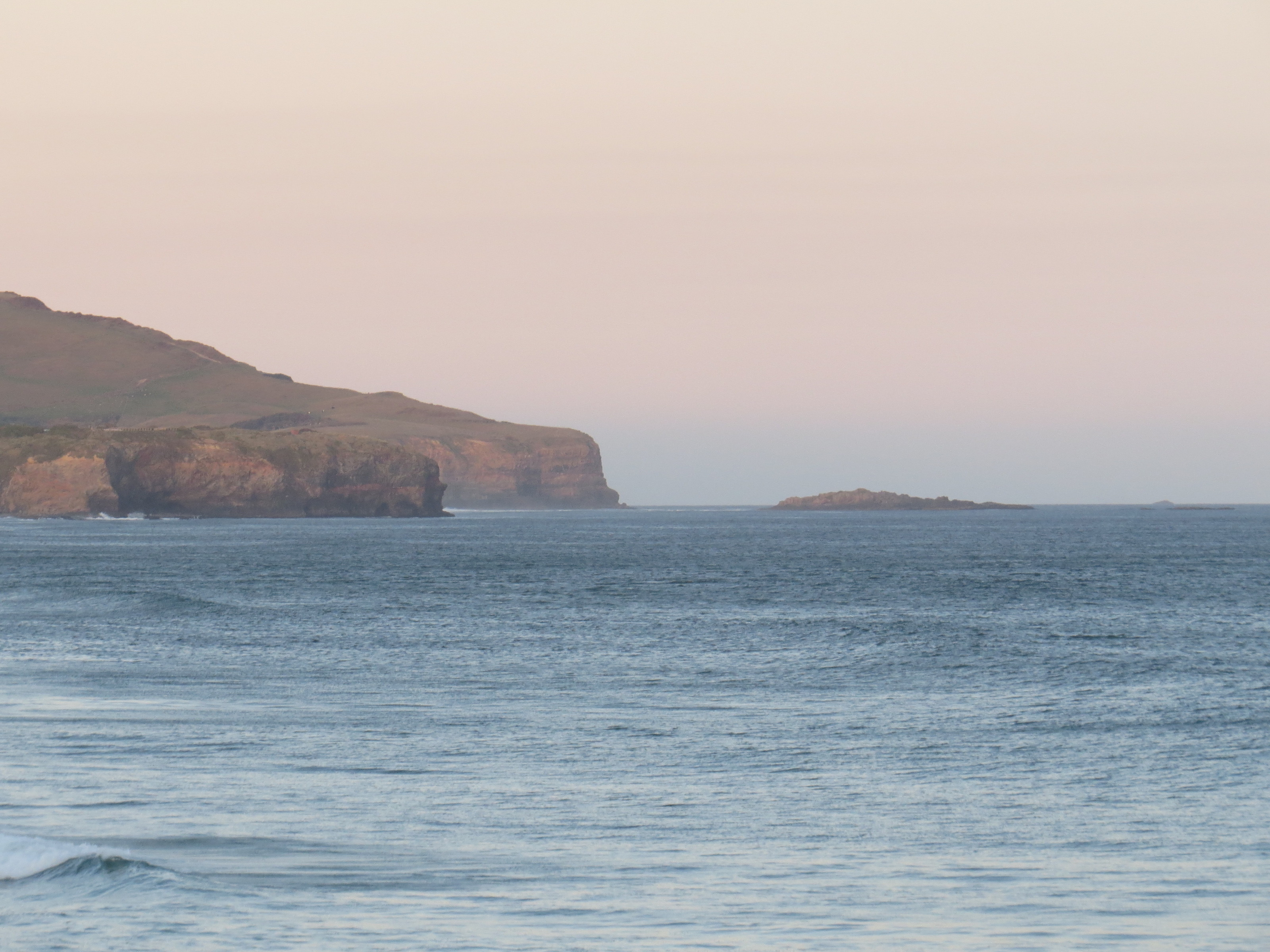
- Lawyer's Head, Māori Head, and Bird Island as seen from St. Clair, Dunedin, New Zealand

Geography
- Coordinates: 45.91153°S 170.559263°E

Administration
- New Zealand
- Region: Otago

Demographics
- Population: uninhabited

Bird Island is an island off the east coast of the Otago, New Zealand. It lies close to Tomahawk Reef. The low-lying island is clearly visible from most of the city's main beaches, from where it deceptively appears close to the cliffs of Lawyer's Head despite lying 2 km to the east, close to Māori Head.

== See also ==
- List of islands of New Zealand
