= Bird's Rock =

Bird's Rock may refer to:

- Craig yr Aderyn, a hill in north-west Wales
- Kuşkayası Monument, a monument in Bartın Province, Turkey
