= Rodeo Cove =

Bay in California, United States

Coordinates: 37.8289°N 122.5384°W

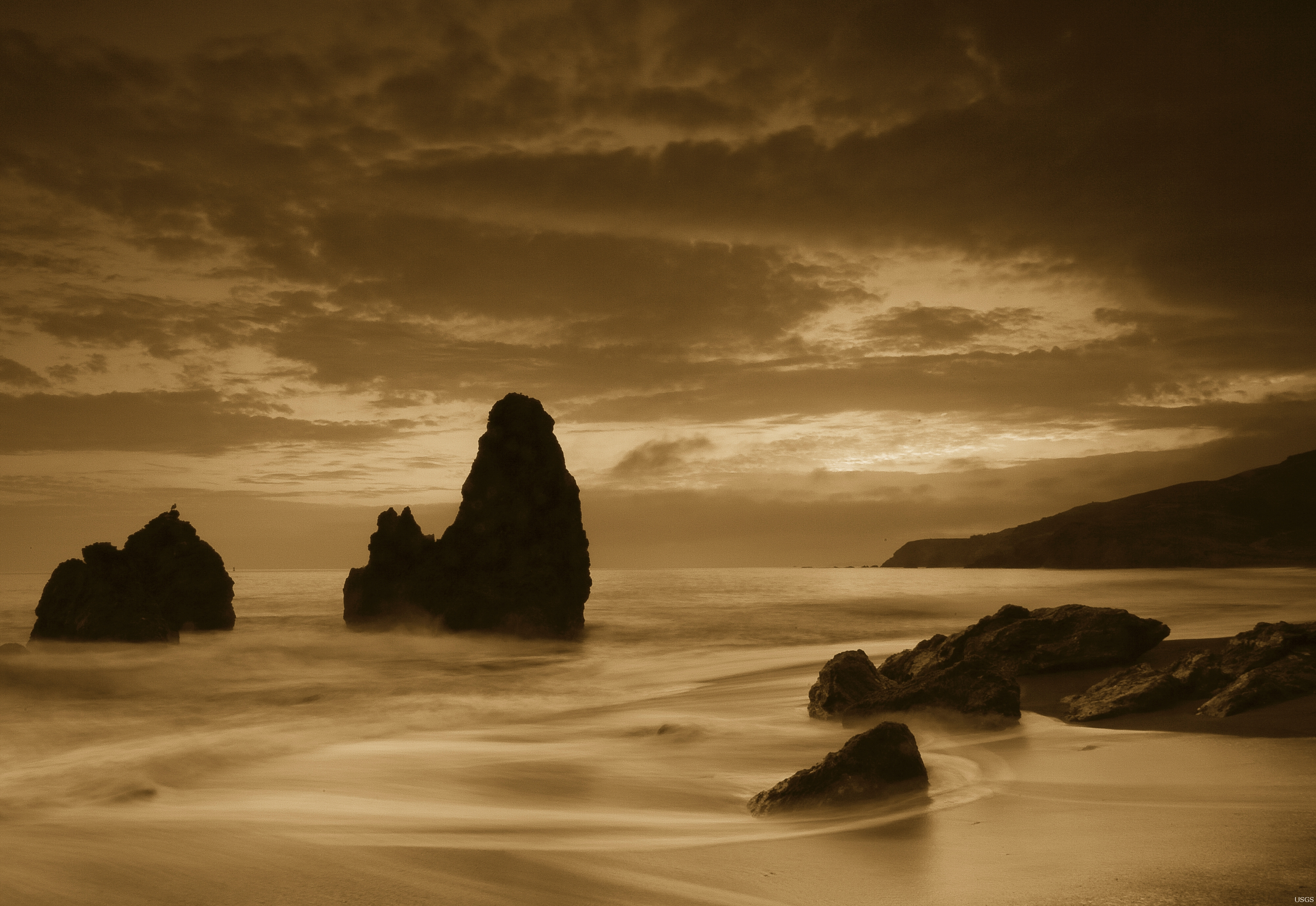
Rodeo Cove sea stacks

Rodeo Cove is an embayment in Marin County, California.
