= Bird Rock (Marin County, California) =

Rock formation

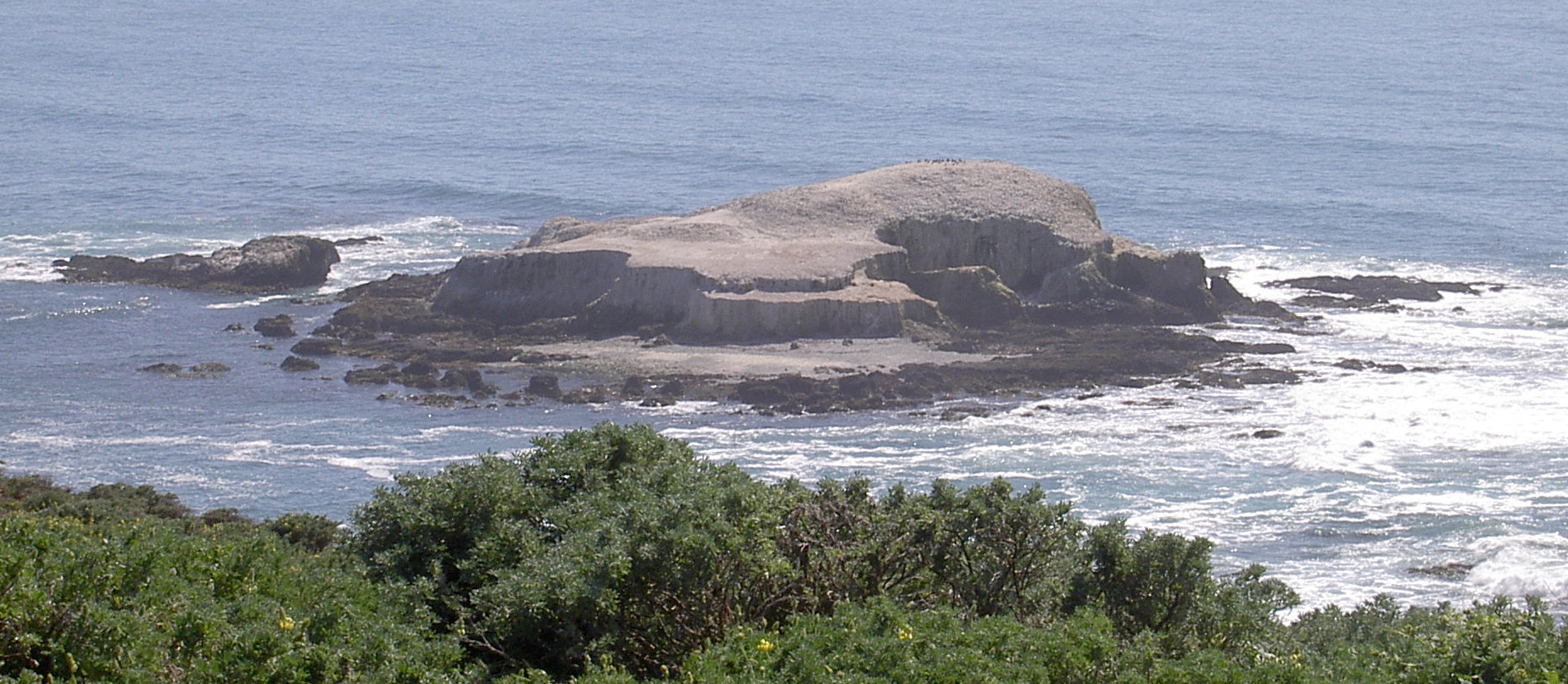
- Bird Rock as of 2009

- Location within California Location within the United States

Geography
- Coordinates: 38°13′48″N 122°59′40″W
- Total islands: 1

Administration
- United States
- State: California
- County: Marin County, California

Bird Rock is a rock formation and a small Pacific island west of Tomales Point in Marin County, California that is roughly 2 acres (0.8 ha).

A seabird colony, the island is covered with a layer of guano. Cormorants are common on the island, and ashy storm-petrels were found breeding there in 1972.

== See also ==
- Bird Island (Marin County, California), located about 35 miles (56 km) to the southeast
- List of islands of California
