= Bird Islands (Nunavut) =

Island group in Nunavut, Canada

- Location within Nunavut Location within Canada

Geography
- Location: Northern Canada
- Coordinates: 66°22′59″N 083°13′00″W

Administration
- Canada
- Territory: Nunavut
- Region: Qikiqtaaluk

Demographics
- Population: Uninhabited

The uninhabited Bird Islands are located in Foxe Basin, closer to the Melville Peninsula than to Baffin Island. They are part of the Qikiqtaaluk Region, in the Canadian territory of Nunavut.
