= List of amphibians of Hungary =

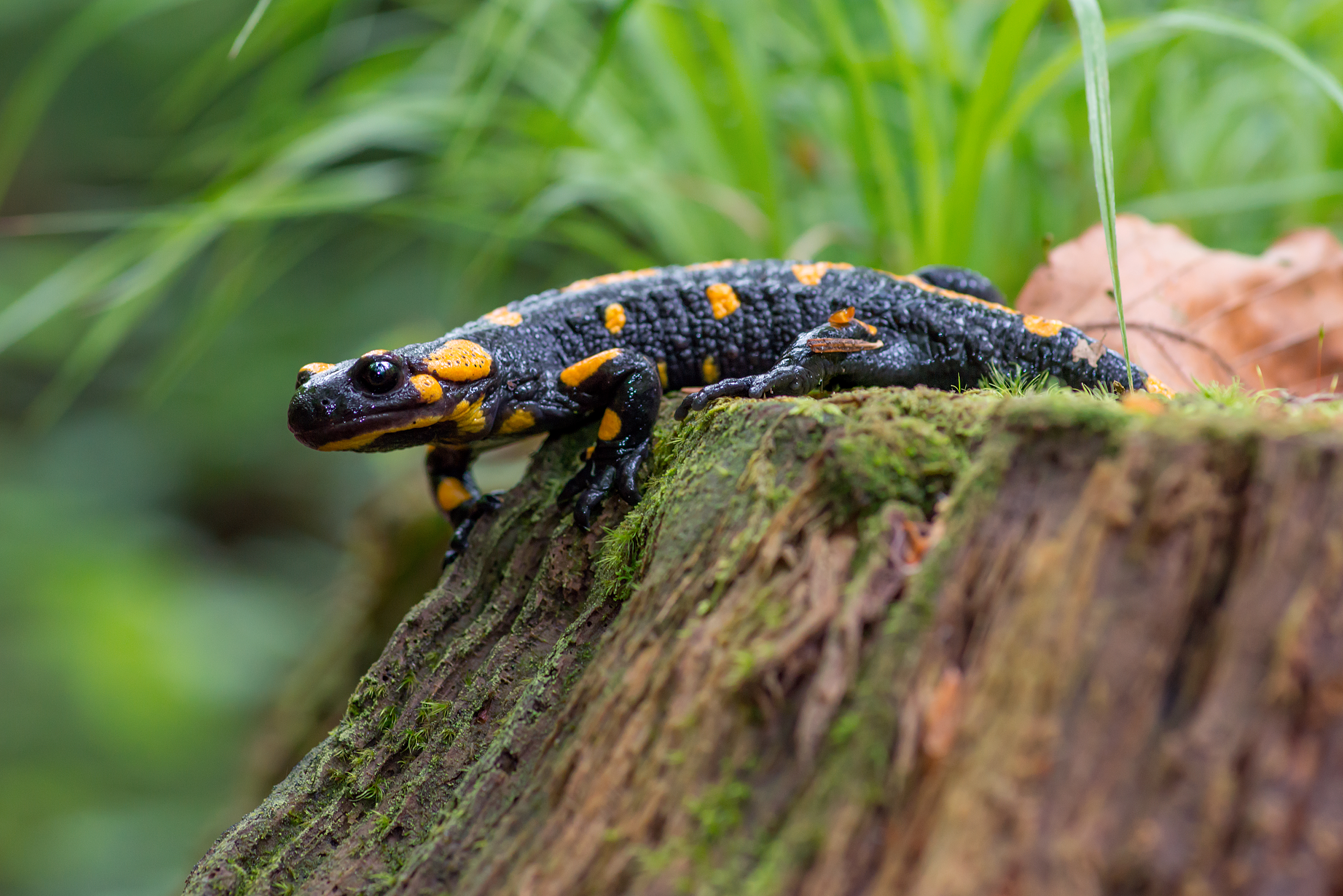
Fire salamander (Salamandra salamandra)

This is a list of amphibians of Hungary.

== Frogs and toads (Anura) ==
- Bombina bombina – European fire-bellied toad LC
- Bombina variegata – yellow-bellied toad LC
- Bufo bufo – European toad LC
- Bufotes viridis – European green toad LC
- Hyla arborea – European tree frog LC
- Pelobates fuscus – common spadefoot toad LC
- Pelophylax ribidundus – marsh frog LC
- Pelophylax lessonae – pool frog LC
- Pelophylax kl. esculentus – edible frog NE
- Rana arvalis – moor frog LC
- Rana dalmatina – agile frog LC
- Rana temporaria – European common frog LC

== Newts and salamanders (Urodela) ==
- Icthyosaura alpestris – alpine newtLC
- Lissotriton vulgaris – smooth newt LC
- Salamandra salamandra – fire salamander LC
- Triturus carnifex – Italian crested newt LC
- Triturus cristatus – great crested newt LC
- Triturus dobrogicus – Danube crested newtLC
