= Bird Island (Tasman Region) =

Island in New Zealand

Geography
- Coordinates: 41.266647°S 173.108688°E

Administration
- New Zealand
- Region: Tasman

Demographics
- Population: uninhabited

Bird Island is an island west of Moturoa / Rabbit Island in the Tasman District of New Zealand.

== See also ==
- List of islands of New Zealand
