= Bird Islands (Queensland) =

Group of islands off the Northern Australian coast

- Interactive map of Bird Islands

Geography
- Location: Northern Australia
- Coordinates: 11.790°S 143.083°E
- Area: 0.21 km^{2} (0.081 sq mi)

Administration
- Australia
- State: Queensland

Bird Islands are 2 small islands in the Northern part of Shelburne Bay in far north Queensland, Australia about 30 km north of Cape Grenville, Cape York Peninsula in the Great Barrier Reef Marine Park Queensland, Australia. It is around 21 hectares or 0.21 square km in size.
