= Viaduct Harbour =

- Suburb
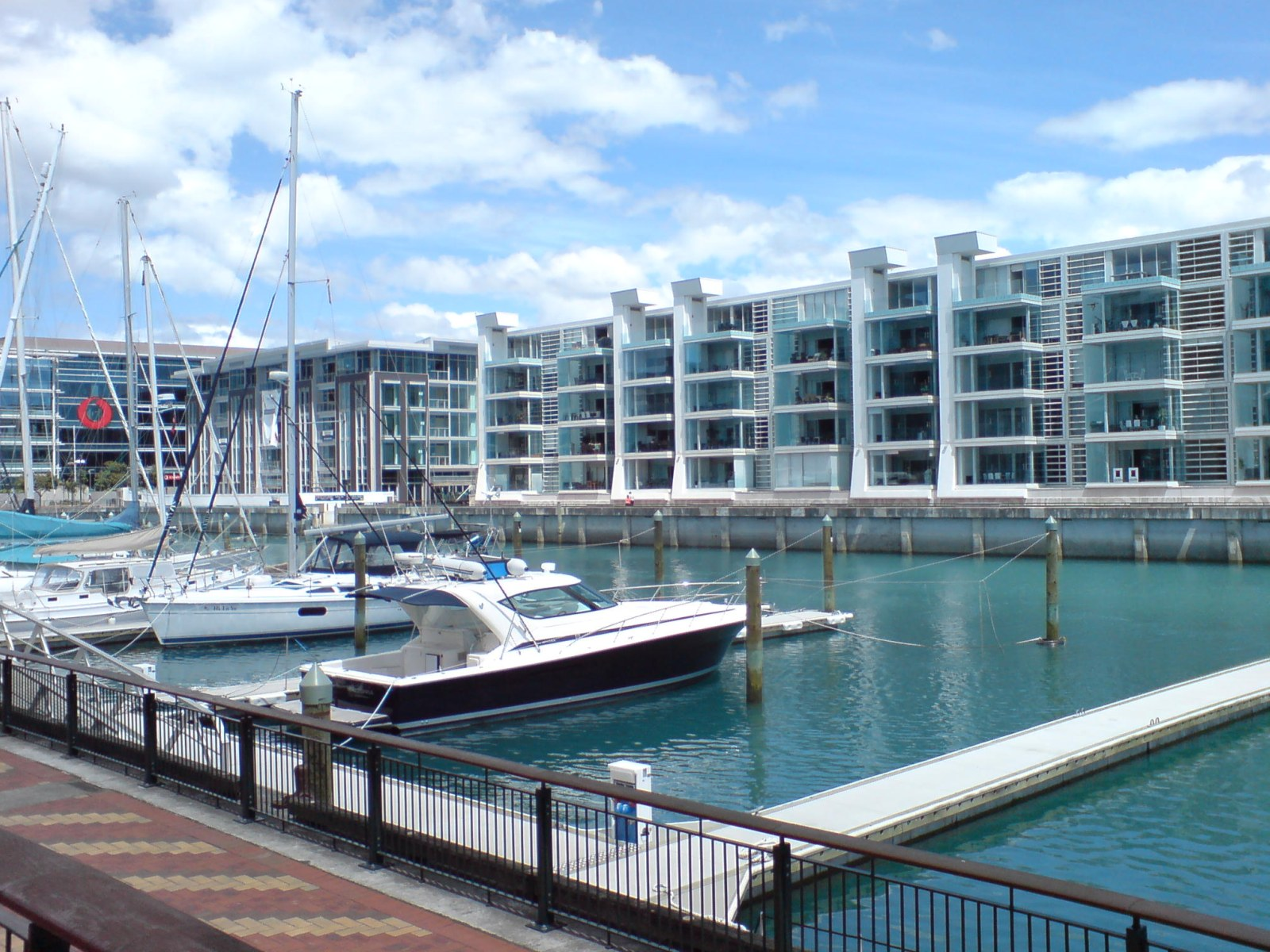
- Lighter Basin area, at the western edge of the Viaduct Harbour
- Interactive map of Viaduct Harbour
- Coordinates: 36.843534°S 174.760015°E
- Country: New Zealand
- City: Auckland
- Local authority: Auckland Council
- Electoral ward: Waitematā and Gulf ward
- Local board: Waitematā Local Board
- Established: 1990s (redeveloped as a residential / entertainment area)

Area
  - Land: 60 ha (150 acres)

Population (June 2025)
  - Total: 1,350
  - Density: 2,300/km^{2} (5,800/sq mi)

(Waitematā Harbour)	(Waitematā Harbour)	(Waitematā Harbour)
Wynyard Quarter	Viaduct Harbour	Auckland CBD
Saint Marys Bay	Freemans Bay	Auckland CBD

Viaduct Harbour, formerly known as Viaduct Basin, is a former commercial harbour on the Auckland waterfront that has been turned into a development of mostly upscale apartments, office space and restaurants. It is located on the site of a formerly run-down area of the Freemans Bay / Auckland CBD waterfront in Auckland, New Zealand. As a centre of activity of the 2000 America's Cup hosted by the Royal New Zealand Yacht Squadron, as well as the 2022 Rally New Zealand, the precinct enjoyed considerable popularity with locals and foreign visitors.

== Demographics ==
The statistical area of Wynyard-Viaduct, which also includes Wynyard Quarter, covers 0.60 km^{2} (0.23 sq mi) and had an estimated population of 1,350 as of June 2025, with a population density of 2,250 people per km^{2}.

Historical population
Year	Pop.	±% p.a.
2006	699	—
2013	975	+4.87%
2018	1,008	+0.67%
2023	1,242	+4.26%

Wynyard-Viaduct had a population of 1,242 in the 2023 New Zealand census, an increase of 234 people (23.2%) since the 2018 census, and an increase of 267 people (27.4%) since the 2013 census. There were 624 males and 618 females in 843 dwellings. 6.0% of people identified as LGBTIQ+. The median age was 48.1 years (compared with 38.1 years nationally). There were 36 people (2.9%) aged under 15 years, 240 (19.3%) aged 15 to 29, 708 (57.0%) aged 30 to 64, and 258 (20.8%) aged 65 or older.

People could identify as more than one ethnicity. The results were 73.2% European (Pākehā); 6.3% Māori; 2.4% Pasifika; 21.3% Asian; 4.1% Middle Eastern, Latin American and African New Zealanders (MELAA); and 2.2% other, which includes people giving their ethnicity as "New Zealander". English was spoken by 98.3%, Māori language by 1.9%, Samoan by 0.5%, and other languages by 27.8%. No language could be spoken by 0.5% (e.g. too young to talk). The percentage of people born overseas was 48.8, compared with 28.8% nationally.

Religious affiliations were 26.8% Christian, 2.9% Hindu, 0.7% Islam, 0.2% Māori religious beliefs, 2.4% Buddhist, 0.2% New Age, 0.5% Jewish, and 1.4% other religions. People who answered that they had no religion were 59.2%, and 5.3% of people did not answer the census question.

Of those at least 15 years old, 651 (54.0%) people had a bachelor's or higher degree, 363 (30.1%) had a post-high school certificate or diploma, and 195 (16.2%) people exclusively held high school qualifications. The median income was $79,100, compared with $41,500 nationally. 471 people (39.1%) earned over $100,000 compared to 12.1% nationally. The employment status of those at least 15 was that 756 (62.7%) people were employed full-time, 123 (10.2%) were part-time, and 30 (2.5%) were unemployed.

== History ==
=== Original purpose ===
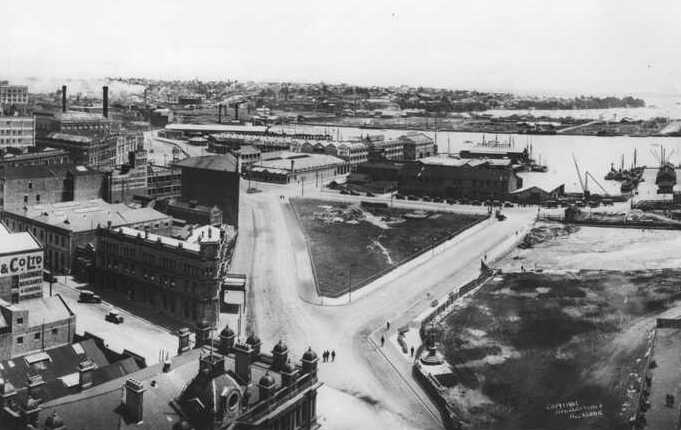
The Viaduct Basin in 1924

Designed along the line of the basins common in London, the Viaduct Basin was so-called because of a failed scheme by the Auckland Harbour Board in the early years of the 20th century. As the size of ships was increasing dramatically, rather than build new wharves or dredge the harbour channels, it was proposed that cargo ships moor out in the Waitematā Harbour channel and be unloaded into "lighters", small barges that would then ferry the goods to shore via the specially built wharves in the new "Viaduct Lighter Basin". The shipping companies refused to co-operate and forced the Harbour Board to engage in dredging and the construction of new wharves.

This left the partially completed lighter basin without a real purpose, so it was used to berth the various fishing boats and thus tidy up the appearance of the Auckland waterfront further east. Next to the Lighter Basin a fish market and various warehouses were constructed, including Turners & Growers Ltd, the city's main produce wholesalers. The far side of the area was connected by a mechanical bridge that was able to be raised to allow passage into the basin to the fishing vessels which used it.

For most of the 20th century, the harbour acted as the centre for much of the fishing industry in Auckland.

==== Shipyards ====
Timber mills had occupied the edges of Freeman's Bay prior to the construction of the Lighter Basin and Victoria Park; these continued to be a feature of the area for most of the 20th century along with other industries such as foundries, many of which were associated with ship building in one way or another.

Boat building in Freeman's Bay was started in 1864 by Donald McInnis, who built a schooner. Other yards, added along much of the waterfront, included -

- Charles Bailey started off a series of firms. He was an apprentice of Henry Niccol and took over George Beddoes' Devonport yard in 1870. He moved to a larger yard on Customs Street West, where he built PS Britannia for Devonport Steam Ferry in 1885. William George Lowe was an apprentice with Charles Bailey and later joined Lane & Brown at Totara North. When Charles (junior) and Walter Bailey started at Freeman's Bay as C & W Bailey, W G Lowe returned to join them. That firm was dissolved in 1900, when W G Lowe started on his own, but was soon joined by Walter Bailey to form Bailey & Lowe, which had a yard on Customs Street West in 1903, until Walter Bailey died in 1927. In 1904 Charles Bailey's yard was opposite Gleeson's Hotel, which was on the corner of Hobson Street and Fanshawe Street. Charles Bailey & Son had a yard at Beaumont Street, Freeman's Bay, which caught fire in 1907, where Ernest Charles Bailey died in 1943 and several Devonport Steam Ferry ships were built. W G Lowe & Son then took on the Beaumont yard from 1927, though W G Lowe died on 14 June 1935. They built 5 boats in 1937 and were still at Freeman's Bay in 1942. As part of a programme for the war effort, the minesweepers Hinau, Manuka, Rimu and Tawhai were built at the Marine Department's Beaumont Street yard, initially in timber, before taking over another yard in 1943 for steel ships, the first being Waikato, with a boiler by Hutt railway works, woodwork by W G Lowe and steel hulls by Mason Brothers, who had a yard in Beaumont Street from 1927, after moving from Port Chalmers. Rimu was laid out by Charles Bailey and built by Senior Foundry, which had been near Albert Street in 1913, was bought by Northern Steamship in 1927 and was in Beaumont Street in 1941. About 1971 it became part of Cable Price Downer, which in 1987 was associated with Brierley Investments. Seagar Brothers were on Albert Street in 1892 and later worked on the machinery and steelwork of Hinau at the Beaumont yard.
- John Bigelow was working at John McLeod's yard in Onehunga in 1863. Keane and Bigelow were near Queen St in 1873, R S Bigelow & Sons built Kate McGregor in 1874 and John Bigelow raised a sunken ship in the bay in 1891. They moved to Customs Street West in 1893. John Bigelow died in 1903.
- William Hoile Brown had yards near the foot of Hobson Street and in Poore Street, now Westhaven Drive, on the western reclamation. After W H Brown retired, Percy Vos and Shipbuilders Ltd had yards in Poore Street, from 1922. The Percy Vos yard moved to nearby 37 Hamer Street in 1937 and is now preserved by the Maritime Museum. Shipbuilders replaced their fire damaged site with a new one nearby in 1945.
- James William Carr had a boatyard near the foot of Nelson Street from about 1865. He died in Upper Nelson Street in 1909, aged 81.
- Clare & Waymouth were building lifeboats and yachts in 1867.
- Duthie had a yard off Custom House Street by 1865. Duthie & Ross launched the 200 ft (61 m) long steamer, Golden Crown, from their Smale's Point yard in 1870. Ross had a yard in 1873. Duthie had a yard on the reclamation in 1878.
- David Gouk repaired the barque Crishna in 1871. C Gouk launched the 66 ft (20 m) long scow Dominion in Freeman's Bay on 24 April 1908. His yard started in Customs Street West and he raised over 60 wrecks between 1863 and 1908. From about 1901 the firm mainly built wharves and bridges.
- Henderson and Spraggon, opposite Gleeson's Hotel, was founded by Adam Henderson, who was a shipwright by 1866, though they had a yard off Custom-house Street by 1865. His son, Robert, retired in about 1928.
- C Hewson and R Melville (a Henderson and Spraggon foreman) had a yard at Breakwater Road, near the foot of Princes Street between at least 1879 and 1889.
- Robert Logan had a yard on Customs Street West.
- Captain Richard Mackay had a yard from about 1855 near the foot of Albert and Hobson Streets. His largest ship was the 112 ft (34 m) long brigantine, Defiance, launched in 1880 and his last ship was the barque, Northern Chief, built in 1887.
- George Niccol had a Fanshawe Street yard, near the Kauri Timber depot, between at least 1905 and 1924.
- Thomas Thwaite built a twin screw steamer, Jane, in his Custom House Street yard in 1867.
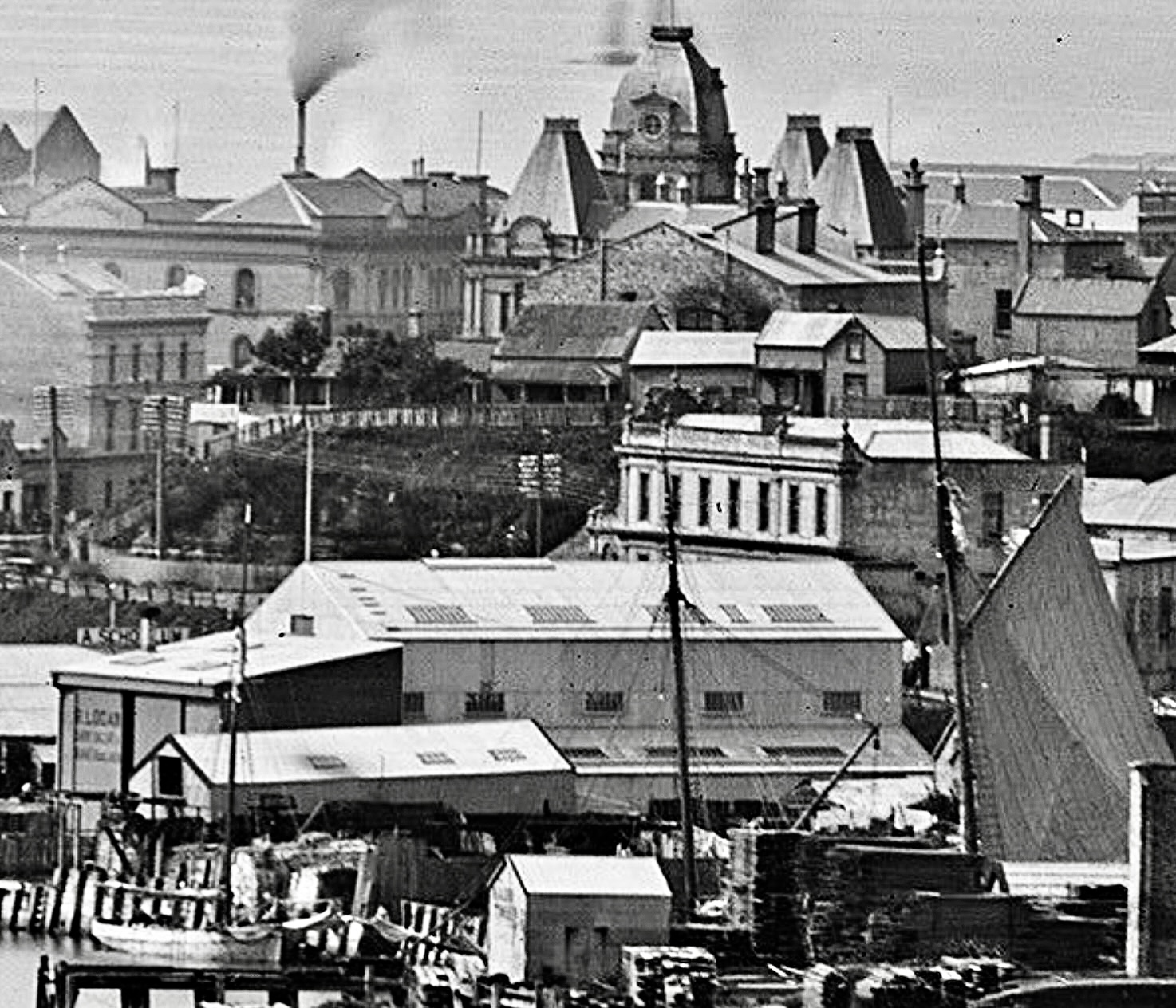
R Logan shipyard and Gleeson's Hotel, Freeman's Bay in 1904

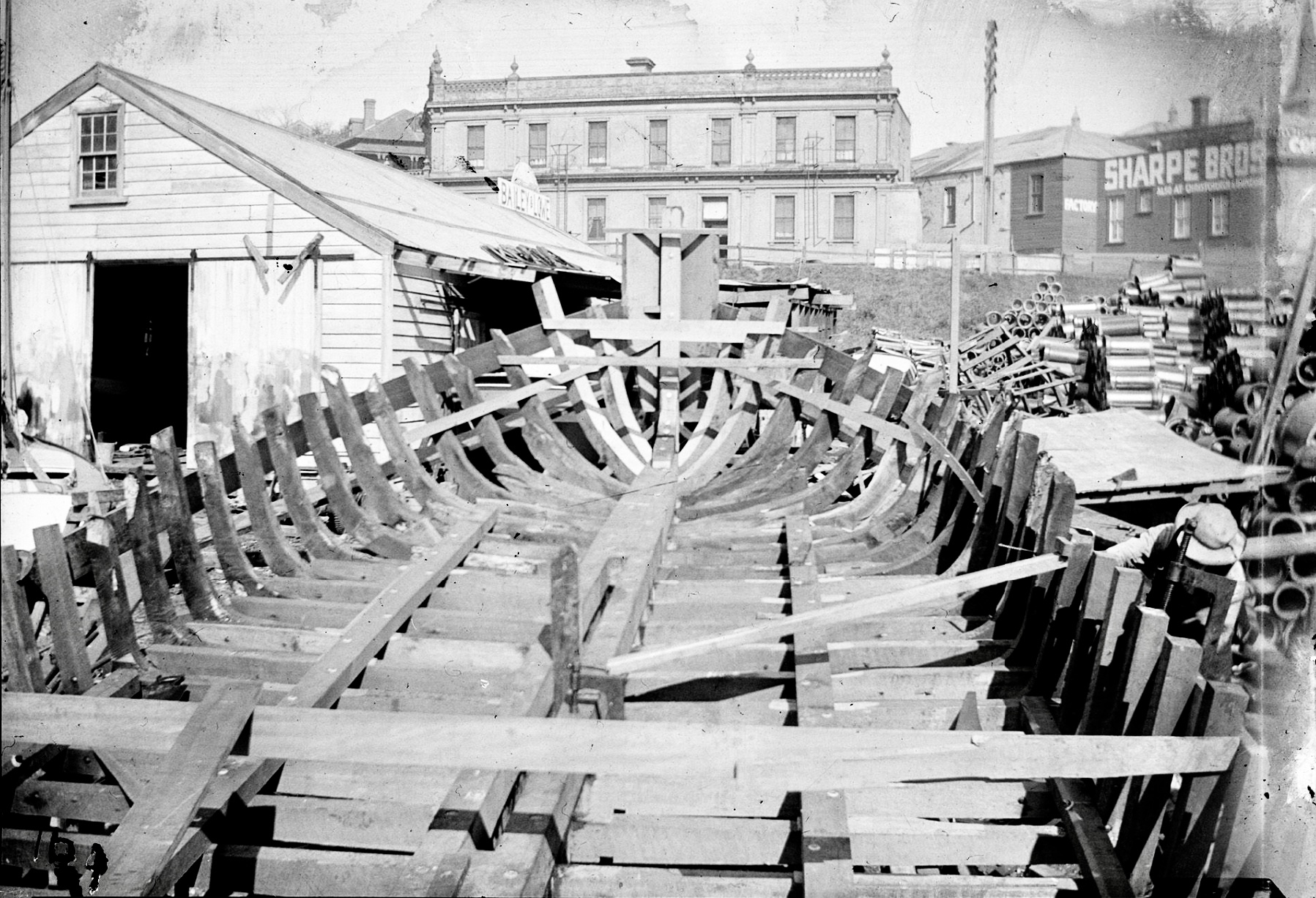
Lena at Bailey and Lowe yard and Gleeson's Hotel in 1905

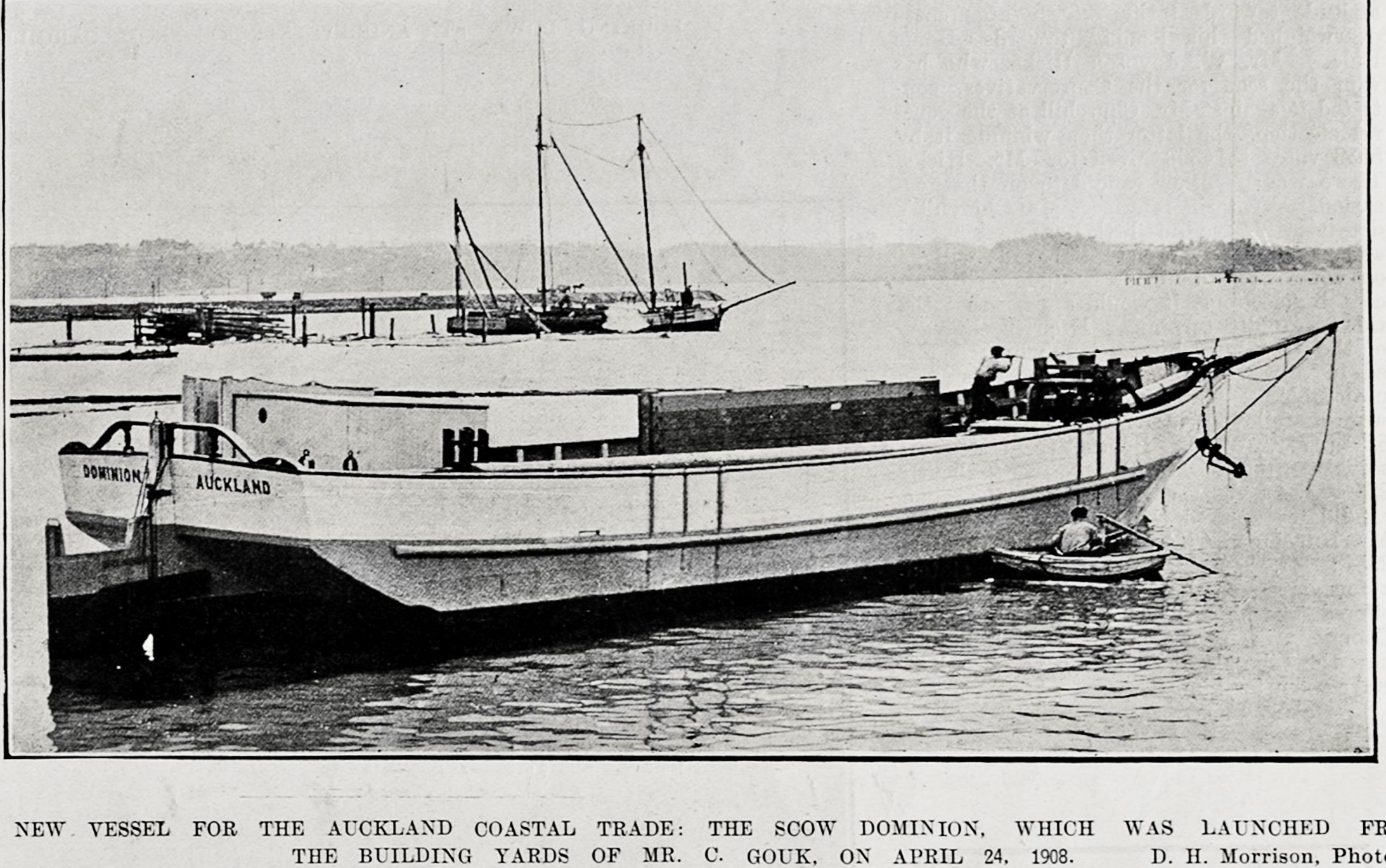
Dominion launch by C Gouk in 1908

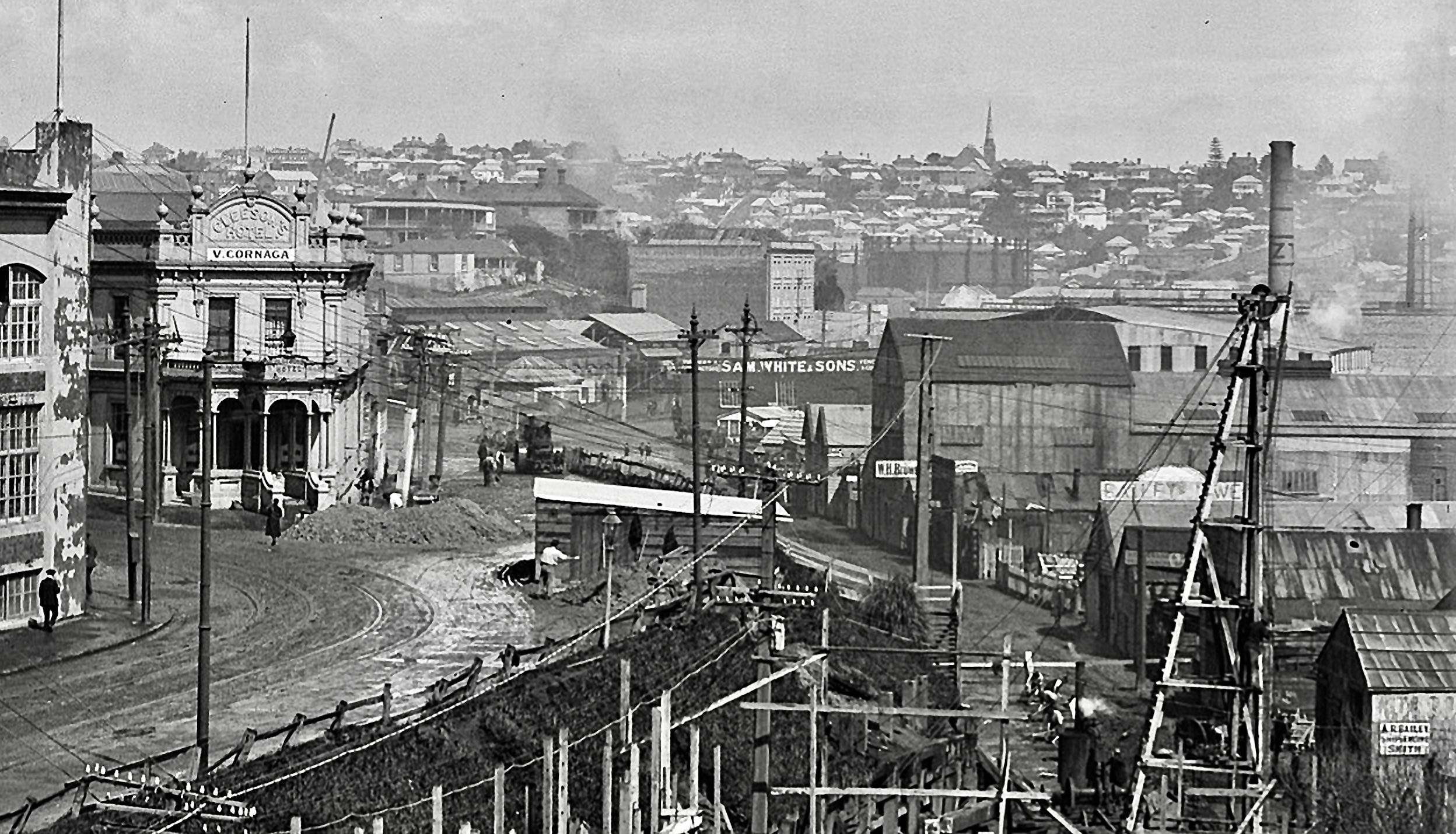
Gleeson's Hotel and W H Brown shipyard at the foot of Hobson Street in 1909

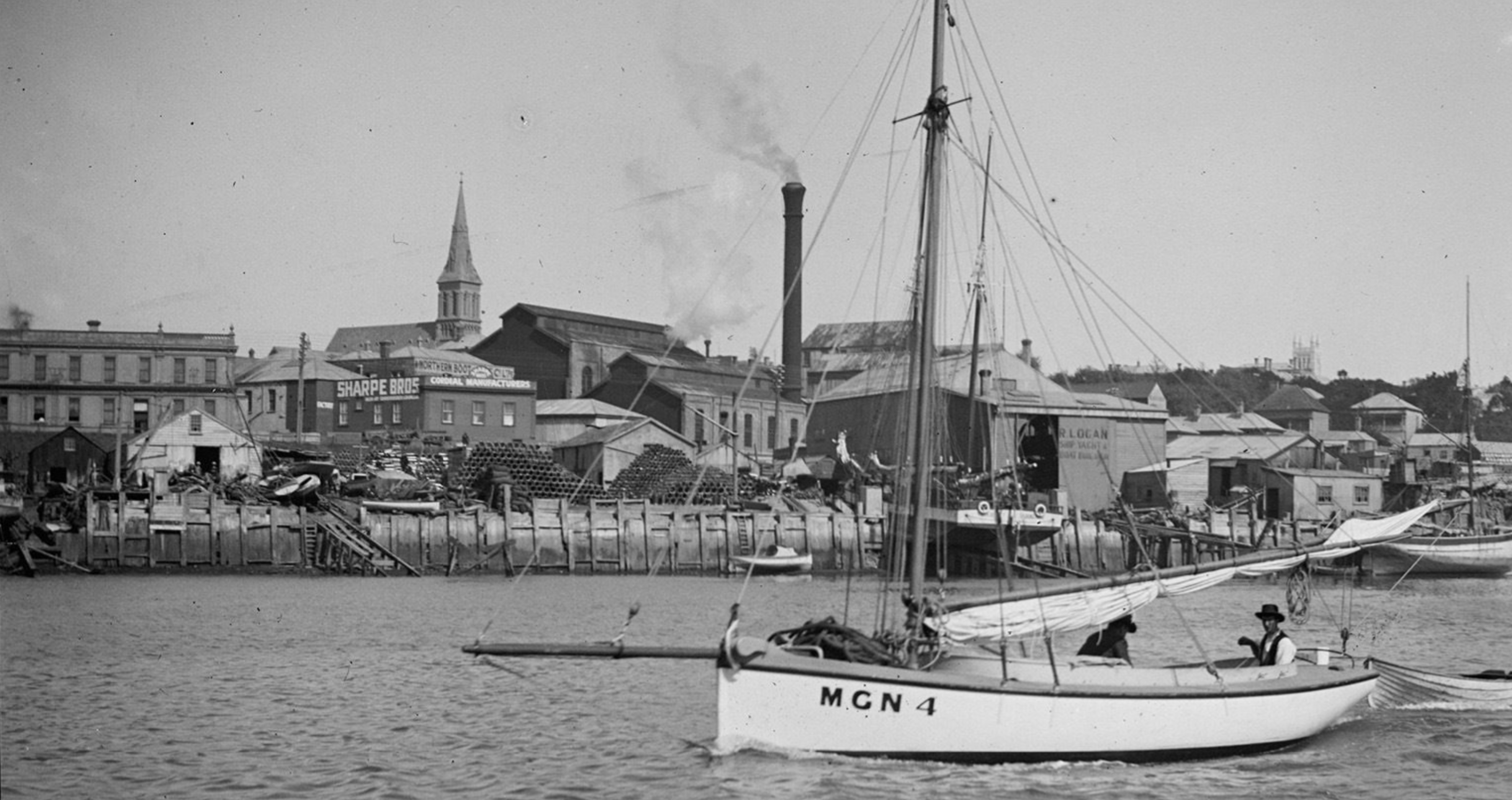
Bailey & Lowe and Robert Logan shipyards, Customs Street West, Freeman's Bay about 1919

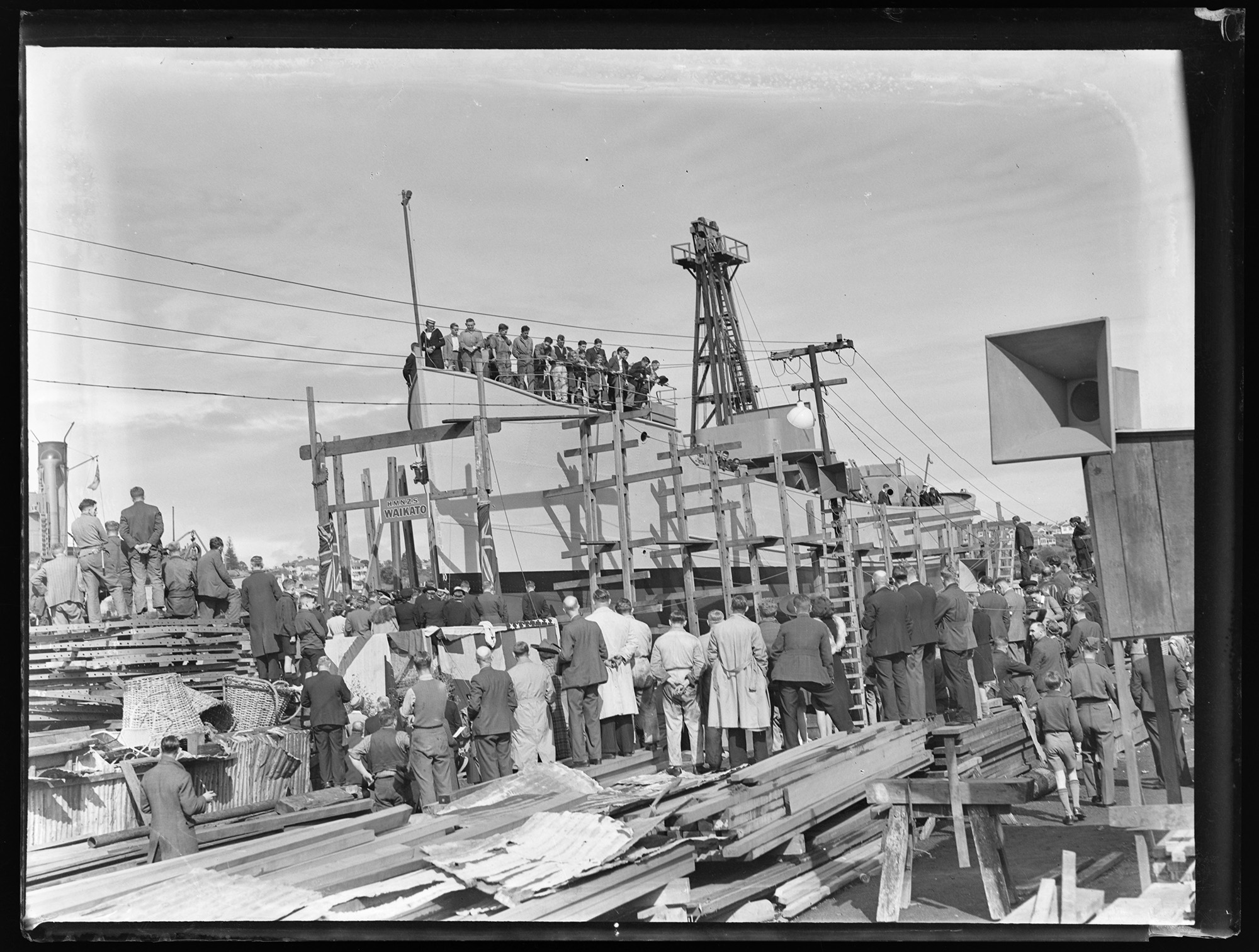
HMNZS Waikato launched from Beaumont Street on 16 October 1943

=== New quarter ===
In 1995, Russell Coutts and Team New Zealand won the America's Cup in San Diego. This led to Auckland hosting the 2000 America's Cup, and the viaduct was redeveloped to accommodate the America's Cup teams. After the competition, the area became a mixed-use zone of apartments and restaurants. In 2011, the area of the Auckland waterfront to the west of the Viaduct Harbour, historically known as the Western Reclamation or Tank Farm, was redeveloped into Wynyard Quarter.

== Gallery ==
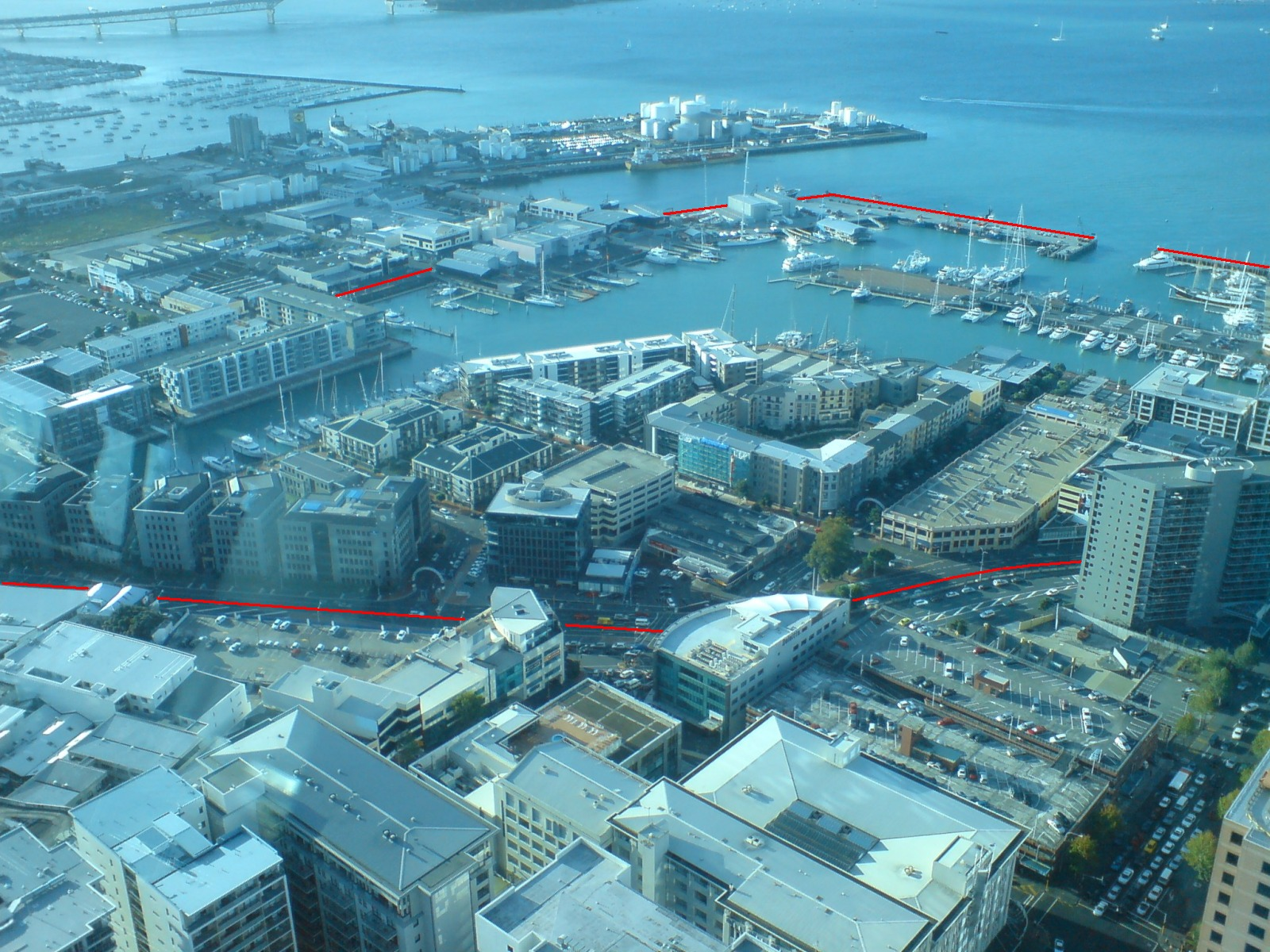
The quarter seen from the Sky Tower, with approximate boundaries shown marked in red

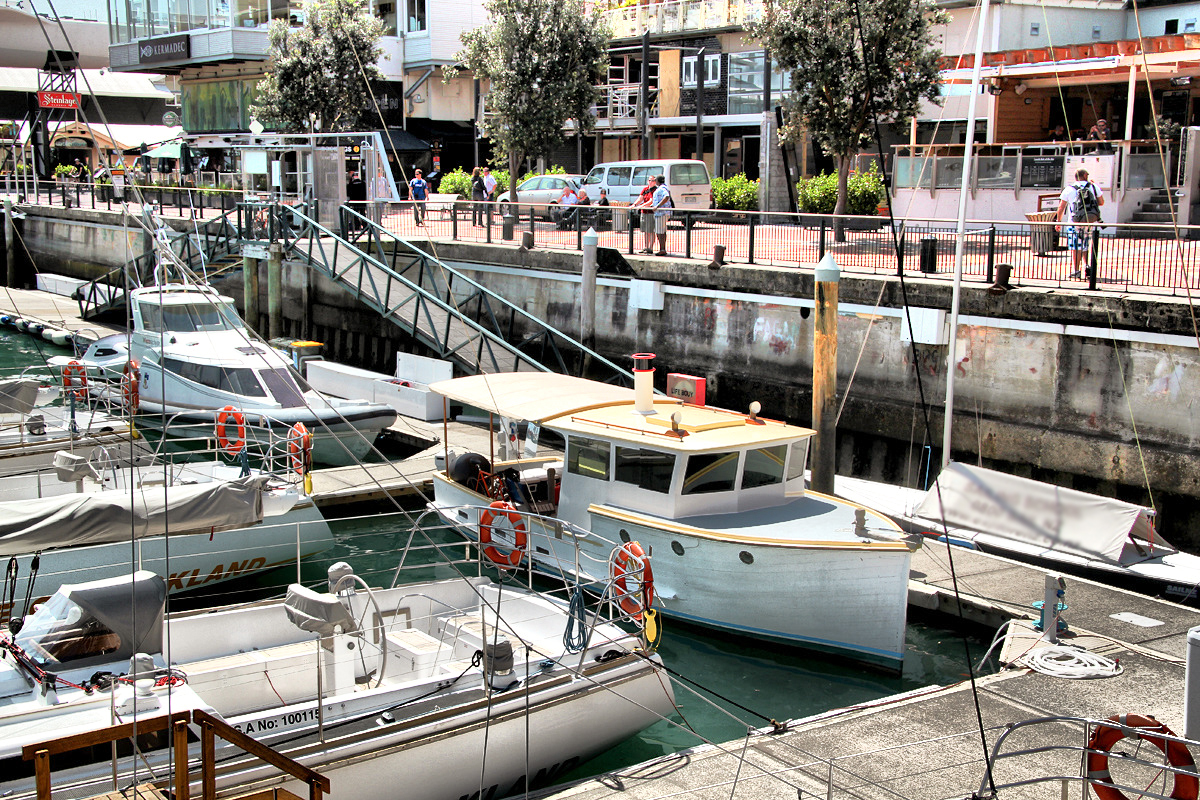
The original redevelopment on the eastern side of the Viaduct Harbour

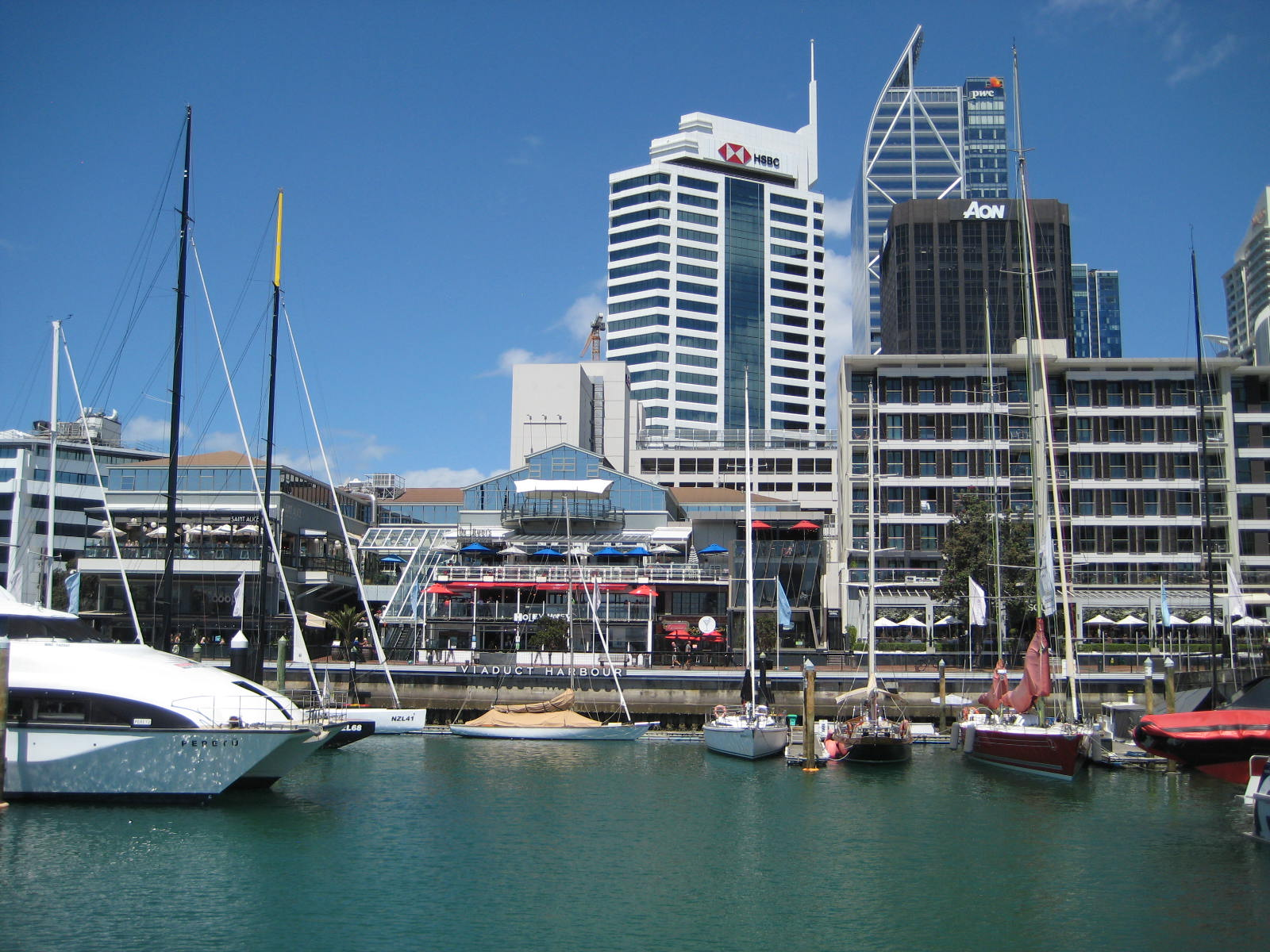
The eastern end viewed from on the water

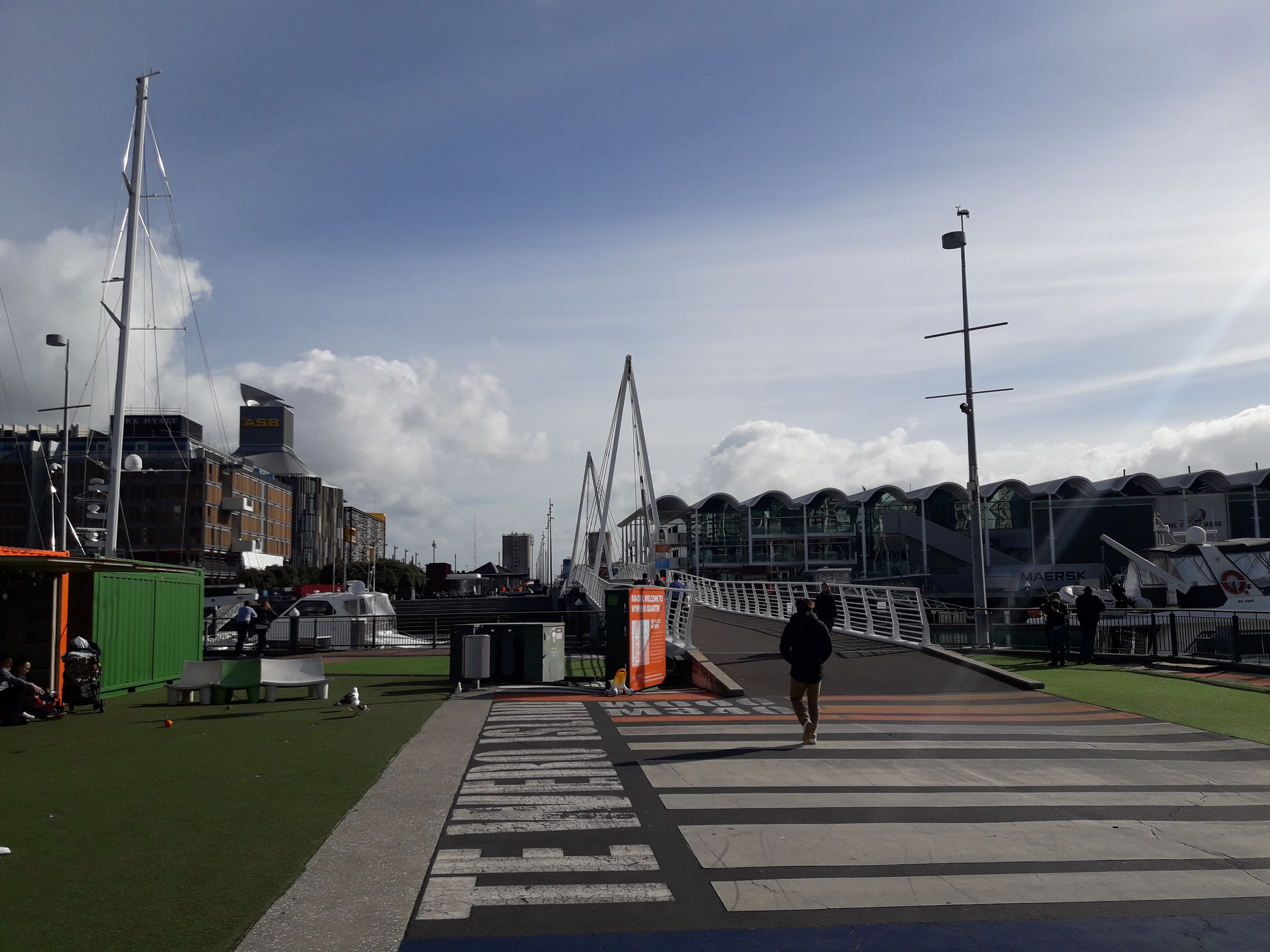
Drawbridge linking the Viaduct Harbour to the Wynyard Quarter in Auckland

== See also ==
- America's Cup
- Freemans Bay
- Princes Wharf
