= Niccol =

Niccol is an English surname. Notable people with the surname include:

- Andrew Niccol (born 1964), New Zealand screenwriter, producer, and director
- Brian Niccol (born 1974), American businessman
- George Turnbull Niccol (1858–1940), New Zealand shipbuilder and ship owner
- Henry Niccol (1819–1887), New Zealand shipbuilder, father of George
