= HMNZS Hinau (T17) =

Castle-class minesweeper of the New Zealand Navy

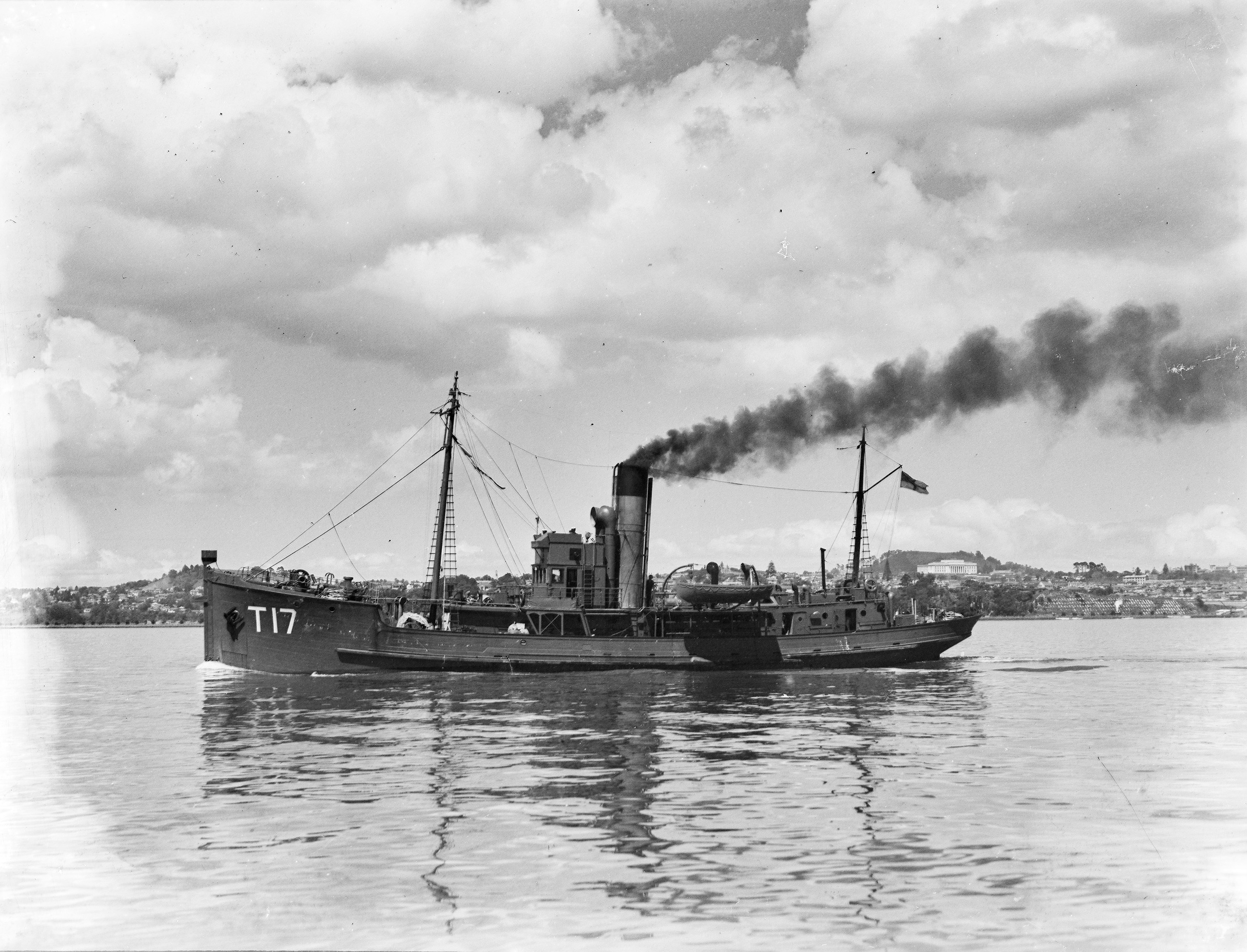
- HMNZS Hinau with Auckland central visible in the background.

History

New Zealand
- Name: Hinau
- Builder: Senior Foundry Ltd. Auckland
- Launched: 28 August 1941
- Commissioned: 23 July 1942
- Decommissioned: 1945
- Identification: Pennant number: T17/T399
- Fate: Hulk ran aground for use as a breakwater and shingle bin in 1958

General characteristics
- Class & type: Castle-class minesweeper
- Displacement: 625 tons
- Length: 136 ft (41 m)
- Beam: 25 ft (7.6 m)
- Height: 13.5 ft (4.1 m)
- Propulsion: Single screw, triple reciprocating engine
- Speed: 10 knots (19 km/h; 12 mph)
- Crew: 25
- Armament: 2 Lewis machine guns

HMNZS Hinau was one of three composite New Zealand-built Castle-class trawlers commissioned by the Royal New Zealand Navy during World War II.

== Background ==
The vessel was ordered after the New Zealand government, facing a requirement for more minesweepers to operate in home waters, chose the Castle-class design because it was simple enough to be built with the country's limited ship construction facilities at the time.

== Construction ==
Hinau was laid down in 1940 and was of a composite design, using Kauri wood due to a shortage of steel at the time. Hinau was launched on 28 August 1941 at Senior Foundry Ltd, located at Auckland. Being the first naval ship built in New Zealand for the Royal New Zealand Navy.

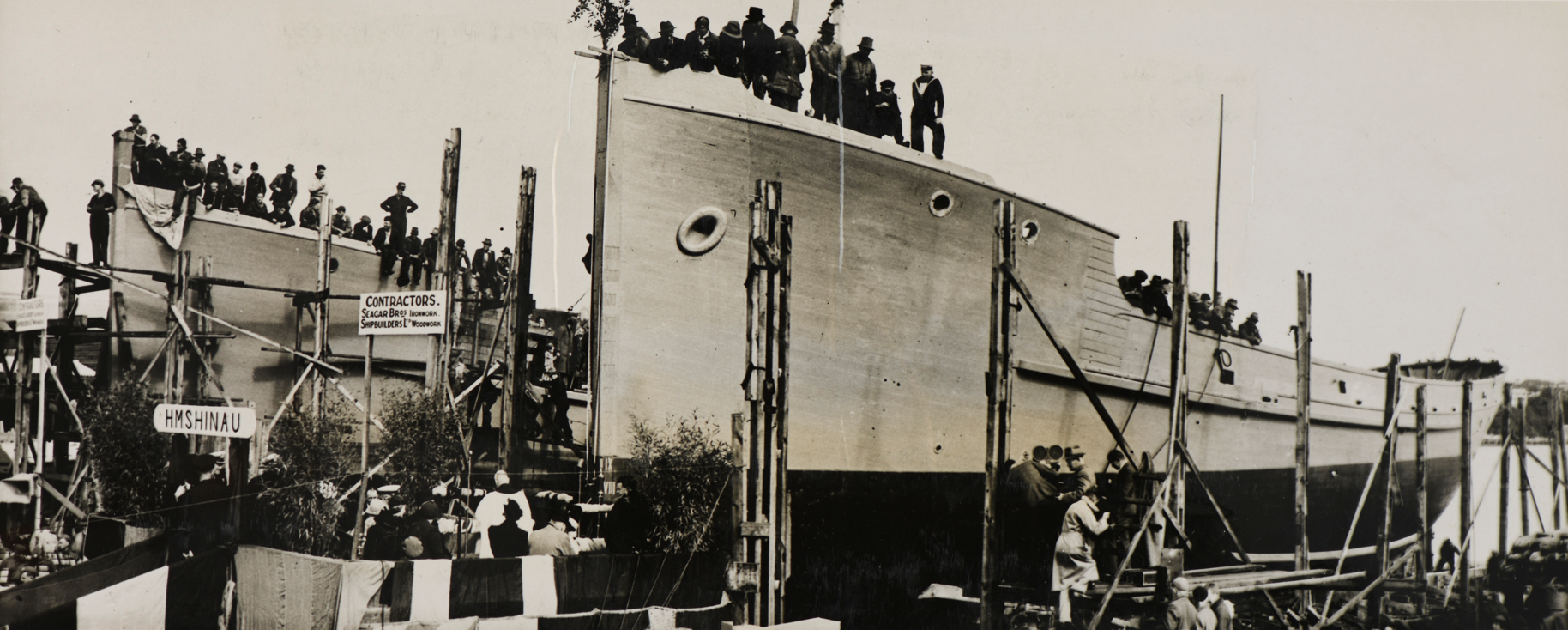
Hinau on launch day, Rimu is seen on the left.

Hinau would be completed in early 1942, with trials being held in April 1942. It was noted that the steering gear was stiff, needing 2 men for manoeuvring, and her boiler room was full of problems, with the report stating at the end “It is apparent that “HINAU” will not be able to operate effectively as a L.L. sweeper without further modification to her boiler room. With it being noted in another steam trial in June 1942 that the ship would be unworkable in hot weather. The RNZN would try to combat these issues the best they could, though Hinau and her sisters' engine rooms would be hot and uncomfortable for those who worked in their engine & boiler rooms throughout their careers.

== Operational history ==
Hinau was the first of four composite minesweepers constructed for the Royal New Zealand Navy and was commissioned on 23 July 1942. The others were Manuka, Rimu and Tawhai. She served in the LL Group (later renamed to the 194th Auxiliary minesweeping division) which was located at Auckland. but would occasionally visit Wellington and the South Island. She would have refits in March 1943, August 1943, and October 1944. On 18 August 1943, Hinau had a small fire in the forward mess while at Lyttelton, with some damage. After the war she was laid up at Devonport Naval Base.

== Post RNZN history ==
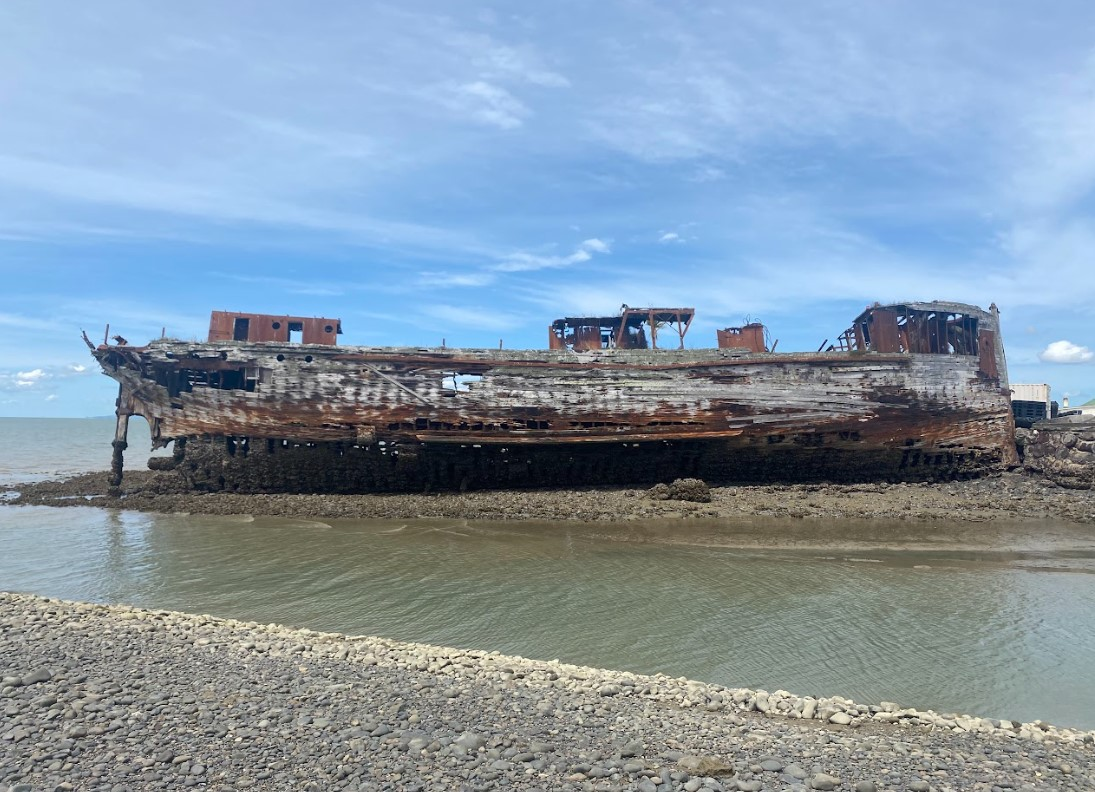
Hinau in 2023

In 1954, Hinau along with Rimu, and the tug Toia were sold to F. Appleton of Penrose to be scrapped at the Viaduct Basin. In 1958, the hulk of Hinau would be towed and ran aground for use as a breakwater and shingle bin in Whakatīwai, where she remains today. In 1998, she featured on the cover of the Dave Dobbyn album, The Islander.
