= HMNZS Rimu =

Castle-class minesweeper of the New Zealand Navy

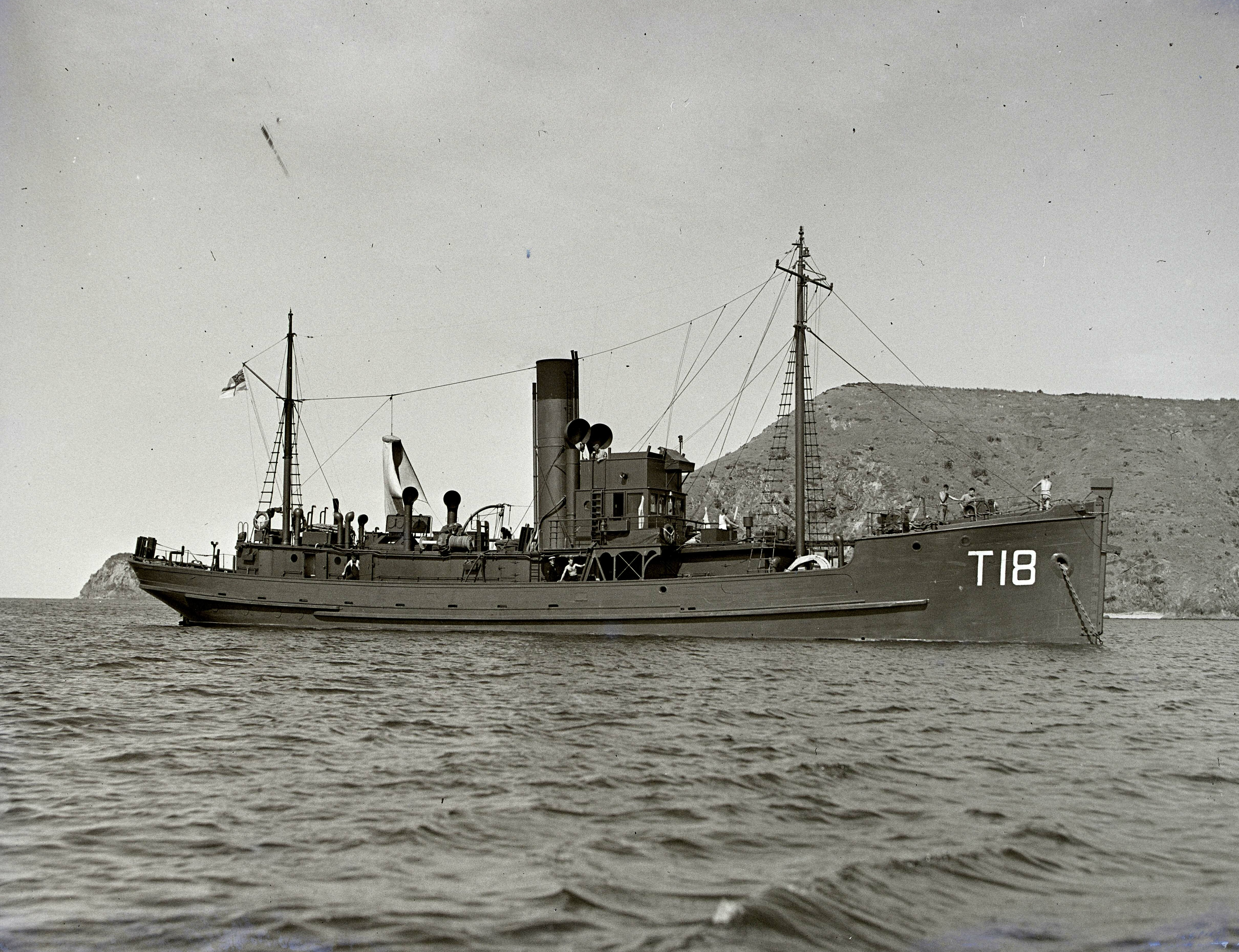
- HMNZS Rimu In the Hauraki gulf.

History

New Zealand
- Name: Rimu
- Builder: Seagar Bros. Ltd. Auckland
- Launched: 9 September 1941
- Commissioned: 15 July 1942
- Decommissioned: 1945
- Identification: Pennant numbers: T18, T402
- Fate: Hulk sunk by the Royal New Zealand Air Force in 1958

General characteristics
- Class & type: Castle-class minesweeper
- Displacement: 625 tons
- Length: 135 ft (41 m)
- Beam: 23 ft (7.0 m)
- Propulsion: Single screw, triple reciprocating engine
- Speed: 10 knots (19 km/h; 12 mph)

HMNZS Rimu was one of three composite New Zealand-built Castle-class trawlers commissioned by the Royal New Zealand Navy during World War II.

== Background ==
The vessel was ordered after the New Zealand government, facing a requirement for more minesweepers to operate in home waters, chose the Castle-class design because it was simple enough to be built with the country's limited ship construction facilities at the time.

== Construction ==
Rimu was laid down in 1940 and was of a composite design, using Kauri wood due to a shortage of steel at the time. Rimu was launched on 9 September 1941, being built by Seagar Bros. Ltd, located at Auckland. Being the second naval ship launched in New Zealand for the Royal New Zealand Navy.

== Operational history ==
Rimu was the second of four composite minesweepers constructed for the Royal New Zealand Navy and was commissioned on 15 July 1942. The others were Hinau, Manuka, and Tawhai (never commissioned). She served in the LL Group (later renamed to the 194th Auxiliary Minesweeping Division) which was located at Auckland. She had refits in March 1943, August 1943, and October 1944.

== Post-war ==
In September 1945, she would be paid off and placed into reserve. In 1954 she was sold to F. Appleton of Penrose to be scrapped at the Viaduct Basin along with the Hinau, and the tug Toia.

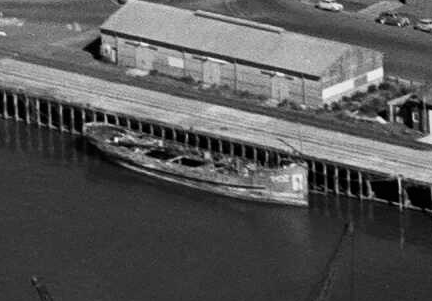
The hulk of Rimu, shortly before she was sunk by the RNZAF.

In 1958, her hulk was offered to the Royal New Zealand Air Force as a target ship. Rimu was to be hit with depth charges, machine-gunned, and rockets from four de Havilland Vampire jet fighters. Rimu was machine-gunned and was struck by dropped depth charges which broke the ship in half, sinking her instantly.
