= Henry Niccol =

- Born: 22 September 1819; Greenock, Scotland
- Died: 9 November 1887 (aged 68)
- Known for: probably the first shipbuilder in Auckland, New Zealand
- Notable work: shipyard on Waiheke Island; Novelty, largest sailing vessel built in Auckland
- Spouse: Sarah McLarty (m. 1840)
- Children: George Turnbull Niccol, Malcolm Niccol
- Parents: Thomas Niccol (father); Isabel McQuistan (mother)

Henry Niccol (22 September 1819 – 9 November 1887) was probably the first shipbuilder in Auckland, New Zealand. He was born in 1819 in Greenock. He was the father of George Turnbull Niccol and Malcolm Niccol (1844–1925).

== Early life ==
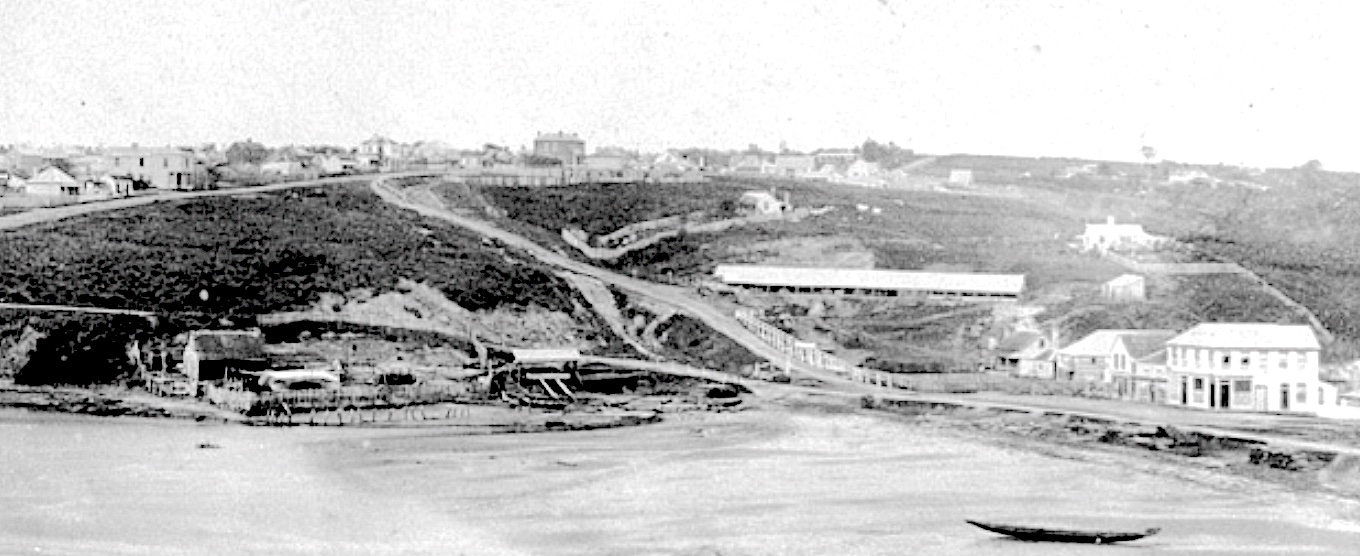
Henry Niccol's Mechanics Bay shipyard in 1855

Henry Niccol was born on 22 September 1819 at Greenock, the son of shipbuilder, Thomas Niccol and Isabel McQuistan. He married Sarah McLarty at Greenock on 29 November 1840 and they were among the first settlers to sail directly to Auckland from Greenock on the 558 ton barque, Jane Gifford, on 9 October 1842.

== Career ==
Niccol set up a shipyard on Waiheke Island and in 1843 completed the 16 ton schooner Thistle, which sold for over £60. He moved his yard to Auckland, to a site now well inland, at the corner of Queen Street and Vulcan Lane, where he built 3 yachts for the Sheriff of Auckland, Percival Berry. By 1847 he was wealthy enough to be one of the larger donors supporting construction of a Presbyterian church. In 1844, for his next contract, the government schooner Albert, he moved to Mechanics Bay, where his first launch was the brig Maukin, which until 1849 was the regular Auckland to Sydney mail packet, when Niccol's brig Moa and later his Novelty, took over.

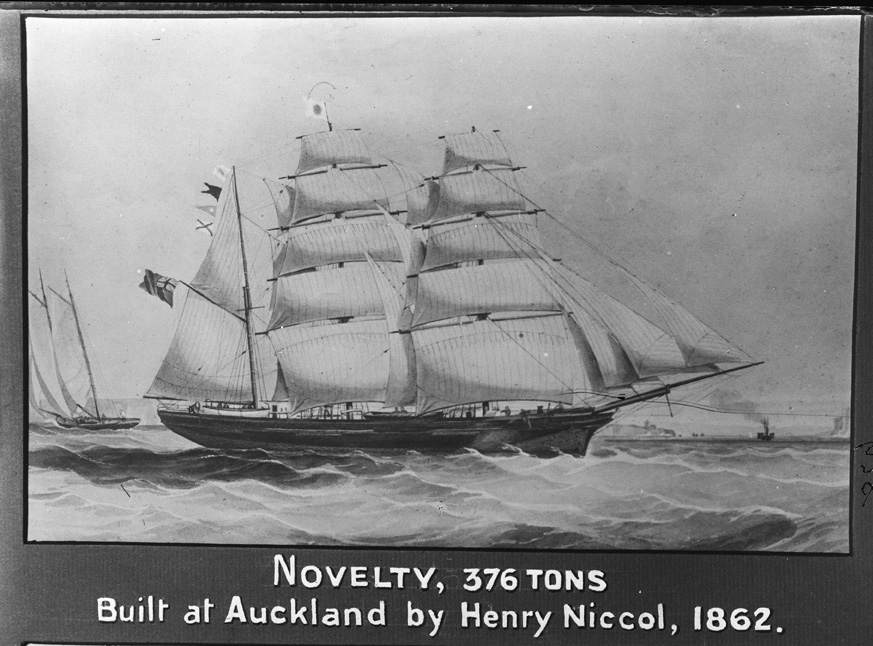
Novelty built by Henry Niccol, the largest sailing vessel built in Auckland

Novelty was a 376 tons barque, built in 1862 for merchants Henderson and Macfarlane, and attributed with making many fast voyages. She was the largest sailing vessel built in Auckland. In 1863 plans were made for the Auckland and Drewry Railway to cross the road between the shipyard and Swan Inn, though Parnell Bridge didn't open until a decade later. In 1866 Niccol moved his yard to Garden Terrace (Queens Parade), Devonport, where he built the first patent slip in the country. However, it cost £10,000, for which he had to sell his ten acres on the North Shore. There he built topsail schooners Pacific, Atlantic, Eclipse and Jessie Kelly for a Sydney merchant, Island schooners, clipper yachts Taniwha and Secret, a 236 ton brig Moa, completed in 1849 and broken up in 1926, Melanesian, an 1874 mission schooner and Southern Cross, which caught fire in September 1926. He built a number of steamers during the 1870s, including three which later formed part of the Northern Steam Ship's initial fleet, Rowena (1872), Iona and Fingal and Tauranga Lady Bowen—afterwards Annie Milbank —the first ferry steamer Takapuna. In all he built 16 steamers and 165 other vessels, with a tonnage totalling 10,519. He was also chairman of Devonport Highway Board, on the first Auckland Harbour Board in 1871 and a Mason. His sons, Thomas and George Turnbull, joined him in the shipbuilding business, but it suffered in the long depression, in this country following the 1878 failure of the City of Glasgow Bank, and he "seemed to lose heart and to get into ill health". The immediate cause of death was a urinary complaint resulting from a fall from a ferry boat in 1884. He died at his Devonport home on 9 November 1887, survived by Sarah, 8 sons and 5 daughters, including Thomas Niccol, a Sydney contractor and Malcolm Niccol, former mayor of Devonport.

Although Niccol began Auckland shipbuilding, many others followed, including Alexander Allison shortly after, Beddoes in 1859, Holmes Brothers, who, in 1864, built the first paddle steamer ferry, Waitemata, Sims and Brown, also in 1864, Charles Bailey in 1876, Robert Logan in 1878 and Scots, McKay & McCallum and McQuarrie in the 1880s. Some engineers, such as Richard Henry Yeoman, only built a few ships.

== See also ==
- Phoenix Foundry, Auckland
- Novelty (1863 ship)
