= HMNZS Tawhai =

World War II battleship

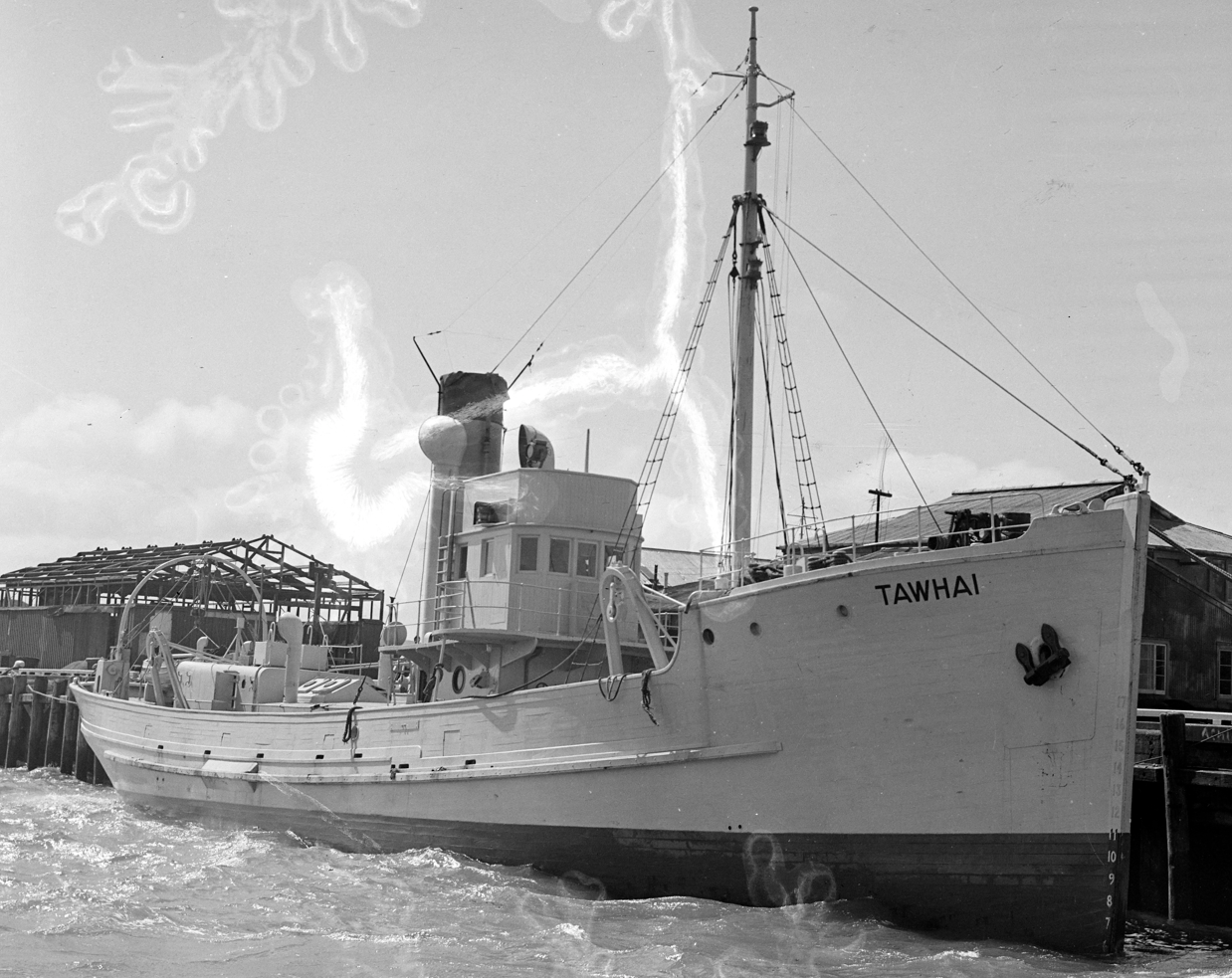
- Tawhai as a UNRRA fishing vessel.

History

New Zealand
- Name: Tawhai
- Builder: Seagar Bros. Ltd. Auckland
- Launched: 20 July 1943
- Identification: Pennant number: T20/T348
- Fate: Sold to the UNRRA.

United Nations
- Name: Tawhai
- Owner: United Nations Relief and Rehabilitation Administration
- Acquired: 1946
- In service: 1946
- Fate: Last documented October 1949

General characteristics
- Class & type: Castle-class minesweeper
- Displacement: 625 tons
- Length: 135 ft (41 m)
- Beam: 23 ft (7.0 m)
- Propulsion: Single screw, triple reciprocating engine
- Speed: 10 knots (19 km/h; 12 mph)

HMNZS Tawhai was a New Zealand-built composite Castle-class trawler built for the Royal New Zealand Navy during World War II for the intention for use as a minesweeper, later being converted into a fishing trawler.

== Background ==
The vessel was ordered after the New Zealand government, facing a requirement for more minesweepers to operate in home waters, chose the Castle-class design because it was simple enough to be built with the country's limited ship construction facilities at the time.

== Operational history ==
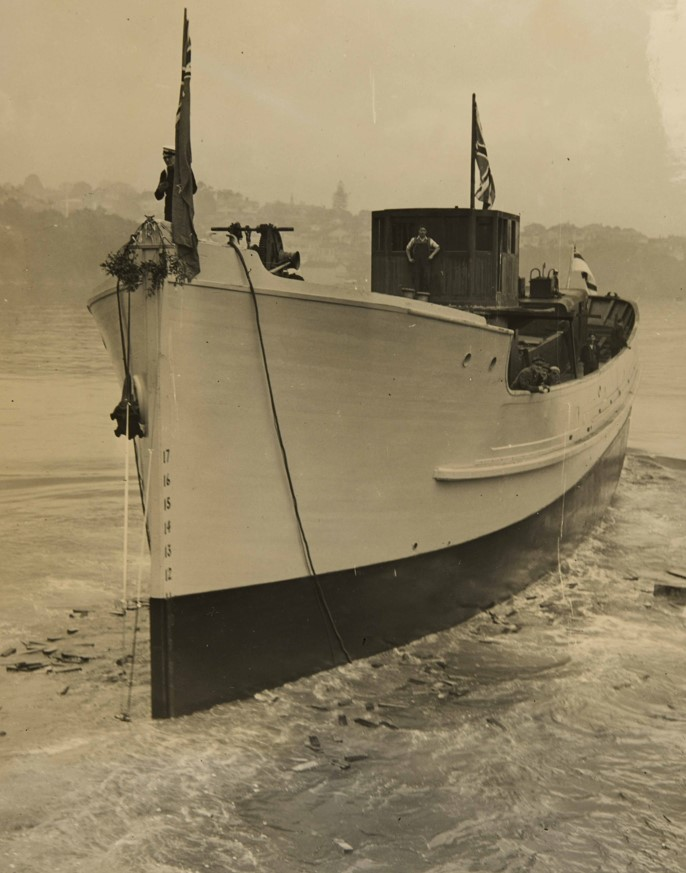
The launching of the minesweeper Tawhai at Auckland.

Tawhai was the last of four composite minesweepers to be built for the RNZN, the others being Hinau, Manuka, and Rimu. Tawhai was originally built for use as an LL Magnetic minesweeper, but by mid 1943, it was clear Tawhai was not needed as another LL minesweeper, so was to be completed as a conventional minesweeper. At the 28 September 1943 Navy Office conference, use of the Tawhai as a servicing vessel was considered but was declined. Tawhai would be 'work suspended' at the date of delivery when 95% complete and was declared surplus to the War Assets Realisation board in October 1944 for disposal. In 1946, she would be purchased by the UNRRA to rebuild the decimated Chinese fishing industry. She was documented still fishing with the Awatere and Pahau fishing at Formosa (now Taiwan).
