= Novelty (1863 ship) =

Barque-rigged iron paddle steamer

Novelty was a barque-rigged iron paddle steamer, built at Sydney in 1863 by P.N. Russell and Company. After being outfitted in Auckland, the vessel operated primarily on routes between New Zealand and Australia, and also made voyages to San Francisco and Tahiti, carrying passengers and cargo. It additionally served as a military troop transport. During its service, Novelty was involved in several notable incidents, including running aground near North Head in 1864 and again off Sumner in 1866. The vessel was wrecked off Quail Island, Lyttelton Harbour, in 1887, and no known remains survive.

== Construction and launch ==
Novelty was launched in 1863 by P.N. Russell and Company, the Sydney foundry owned and operated by the Australian engineer Peter Nicol Russell. Its length was 82.5 ft, beam 15.5 ft, depth 5.3 ft, weight 376 tons. After being delivered to New Zealand, Novelty was outfitted and furnished in Auckland, where there was a launching ceremony on 1 February 1863. The New Zealander newspaper described Novelty in its report of the launching ceremony:

From truck to deck, all is clean, well set up, and ship shape' her masts well placed and stayed; and her rigging sweated down until her shrouds stand out like so many bars of iron;-in fact, the greater proportion of her stays are so, being of iron wire rope. She is fitted with double topsail yards...

She has a top-gallant forecastle, and raised quarter-deck; with an officer's house and cabin staircase...

The saloon is a very chaste apartment, of great length and height with remo styles and mouldings, with open iron scroll work for ventilation. which gives a graceful and airy appearance. The births are roomy and well planned. [sic]

Novelty was owned by a Mr T Henderson, its agents were Henderson & Macfarlane, Auckland, and its master from the time of launching was a Captain Austin.

== Voyages ==
From the date of launching, the vessel made numerous international voyages from New Zealand, carrying passengers and cargo. Most voyages recorded are between New Zealand and Australia, though the vessel also sailed to San Francisco and Tahiti, with passengers and cargo. Novelty was also used as a military troop transport.

== Notable incidents ==
In early 1864, while entering Auckland harbour returning from a voyage, Novelty ran aground on rocks outside the North Head. The vessel was removed from the rocks and thought to be undamaged, though it had in fact lost a piece of its false keel. On its next voyage between Auckland and Sydney in July 1864, Novelty began to leak. The crew pumped, though became exhausted. The Captain, Captain Austin, reportedly ordered the boats be destroyed to prevent the crew from leaving the vessel, saying "now if the ship goes down we will all go down with it". The crew returned to pumping, and Novelty arrived safely in Sydney. One of the sailors on board, David Bartlett, subsequently wrote to The New Zealand Herald newspaper, claiming that the account published was "a concocted tissue of falsehoods", and that the crew "did their duty as becomes the character of British seamen (pump or sink)"[sic]. Bartlett also noted that the boats were visible, undamaged, on Novelty's deck, proving the published account was false. The Taranaki Herald, reporting on the same incident, stated that Captain Austin had only threatened to destroy the boats, if the crew stopped pumping.

Novelty ran aground again off Sumner in August 1866, though was recovered.

== Wreck ==
Novelty was wrecked off Quail Island, Lyttelton Harbour, in 1887.

There are no known remains of Novelty to show where it sank.
