= HMNZS Manuka =

Castle-class minesweeper of the New Zealand Navy

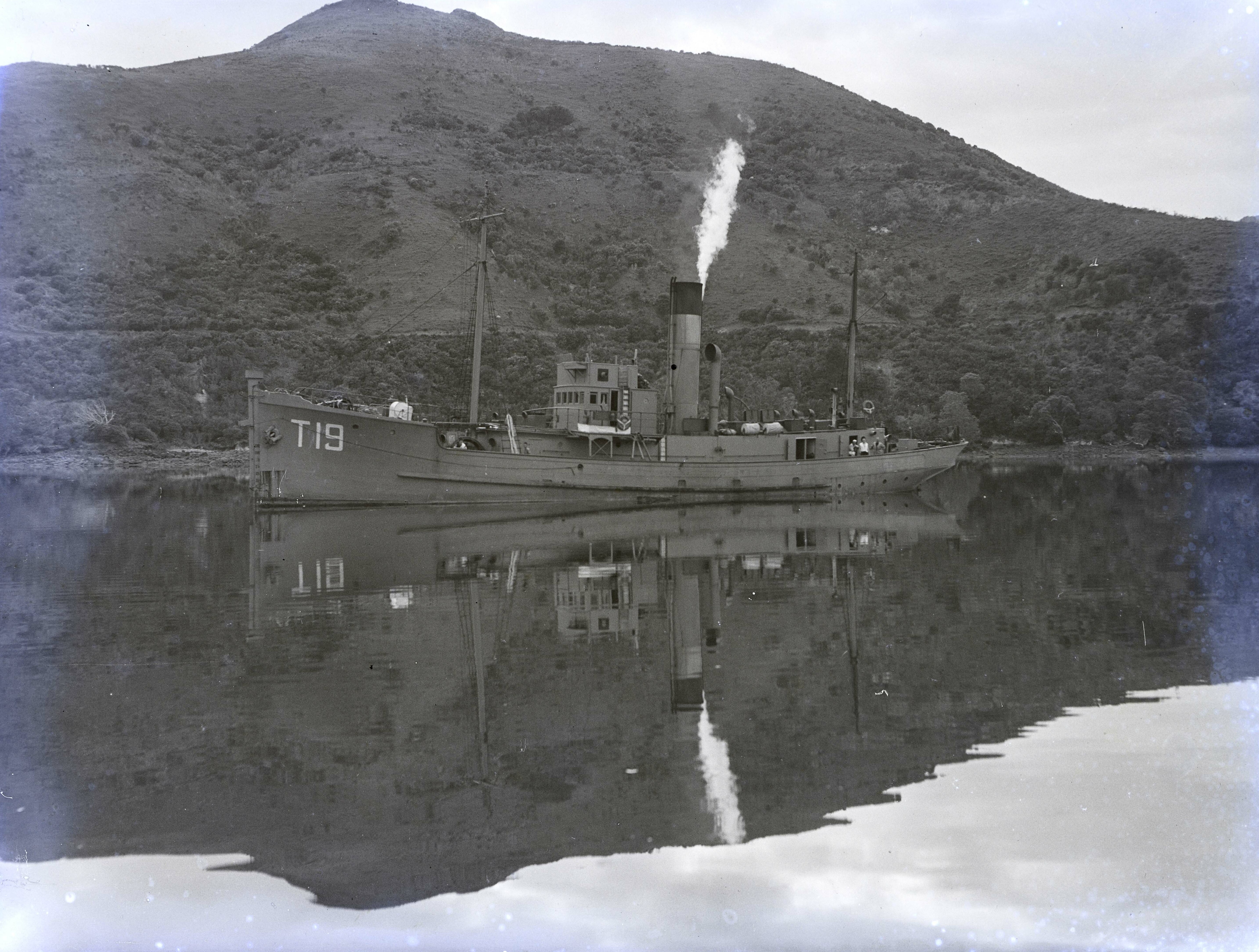
- HMNZS Manuka in the Hauraki gulf

History

New Zealand
- Name: Manuka
- Operator: 1946-1952 Chatham Islands Fishing Company
- Ordered: 1940
- Builder: Mason Bros. Engineering Co. Ltd Auckland
- Laid down: 21 October 1940
- Launched: 23 September 1941
- Commissioned: 30 March 1942
- Decommissioned: 1945
- In service: 1946
- Out of service: 1952
- Identification: Pennant numbers: T19, T401, WN82
- Fate: Sunk at moorings in 1952 at the Chatham Islands

General characteristics
- Class & type: Castle-class minesweeper
- Displacement: 625 tons
- Length: 135 ft (41 m)
- Beam: 23 ft (7.0 m)
- Propulsion: Single screw, triple reciprocating engine
- Speed: 10 knots (19 km/h; 12 mph)

HMNZS Manuka was one of three composite New Zealand-built Castle-class trawlers commissioned by the Royal New Zealand Navy during World War II.

== Background ==
The vessel was ordered after the New Zealand government, facing a requirement for more minesweepers to operate in home waters, chose the Castle-class design because it was simple enough to be built with the country's limited ship construction facilities at the time.

== Construction ==
Manuka was laid down on 21 October 1940 and was of a composite design, using Kauri wood due to a shortage of steel at the time. Manuka was launched on 23 September 1941, being built by Mason Bros Engineering Co, located at Auckland. Being the third naval ship launched in New Zealand for the Royal New Zealand Navy.

== Operational history ==
Manuka was the third of four composite minesweepers constructed for the Royal New Zealand Navy and was commissioned on 30 March 1942. The others were Hinau, Rimu, and Tawhai. Manuka served in the LL Group (later renamed to the 194th Auxiliary Minesweeping Division) which was located at Auckland.

== Post-war ==
In 1946, Manuka was leased to the Chatham Island Fishing Company, under the condition that she would only be used in New Zealand waters, and that she would be given back to the navy in case of an emergency. Manuka would follow fishing fleets, working the coast that was sheltered. At the end of the day the fishing trawlers would discharge their catches onto Manuka, where they would weigh, clean and process the fish. When she was full, she would sail to Wellington, often carrying radios for repair, and mail. When the vessel returned it would carry supplies for the Chatham islanders. As time went by while in service, there would be more and more problems with the boiler on Manuka. to the point where she would need a replacement. Over the course of her career she would also run aground multiple times while fishing. In 1950, Manuka was moored in Port Hutt, acting as a floating freezer, with local trawlers storing their catches onboard. On 4 October 1952, while anchored in Port Hutt, Manuka sunk at her moorings. There was nobody aboard when she sank. The wreck was left underwater and was there in the spot of sinking in 1970s.
