= William Hoile Brown =

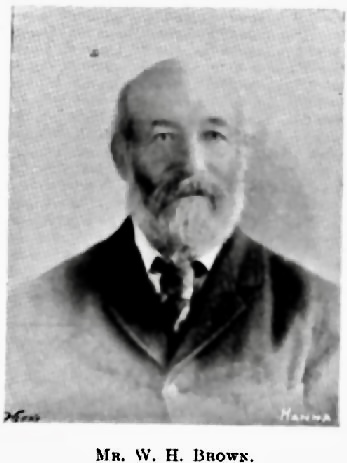
- William Hoile Brown in 1902
- Born: May 4, 1838; Dymchurch
- Died: 6 May 1928 (aged 90); Devonport, New Zealand
- Occupation: Shipbuilder
- Known for: Auckland Harbour Board, president of the Master Shipbuilders’ Federation
- Spouse: Annie Binns 1861
- Children: 7

William Hoile Brown (sometimes named as William Hoyle Brown) was a shipbuilder in Auckland from 1864 to 1918 and a local politician.

== Early life ==
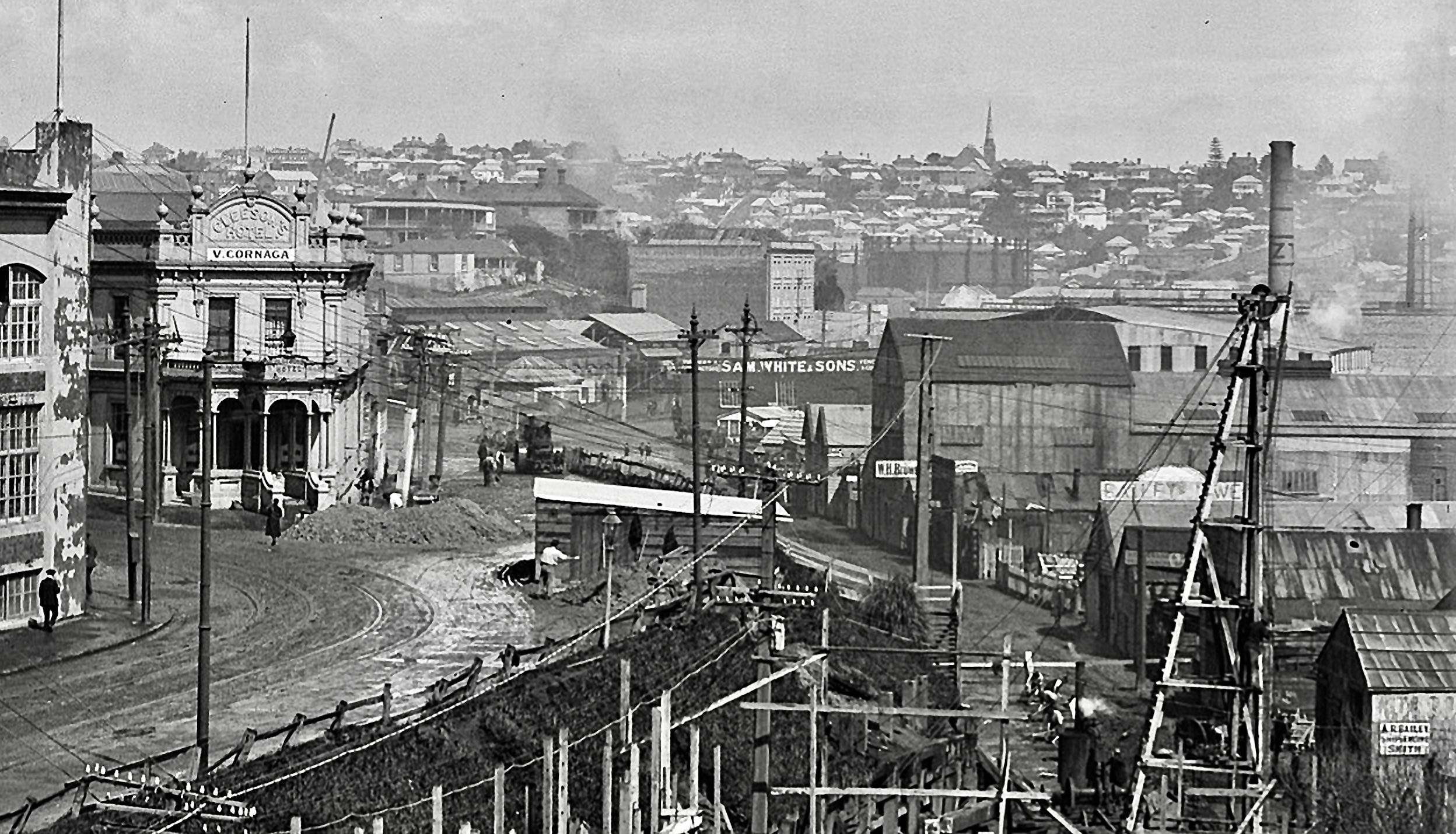
W H Brown shipyard at the foot of Hobson Street in 1909

He was born in a Martello tower at Dymchurch, Kent to Stephen Cain and Elizabeth Brown, on 4 May 1838 and went to Greenwich Hospital School. His siblings were George Hoile, Sarah Heywood, and Elizabeth Brown. There are two versions of the next part of his life. Either in 1850, aged 12, he went to California with an uncle, or in 1855 he went with his father. At Samoa he was on the American barque Elvira when it was wrecked, whilst on a trip to Australia. He was marooned for several weeks, until taken to Sydney by a son of the missionary, John Williams. The 1926 version of Brown's life story says he came to Auckland in 1854, was met by his father, who had also come to settle and served 3 years in the militia during the New Zealand Wars, in Captain Clark's company, building redoubt at Pūkorokoro / Miranda, for which he was awarded a medal. Alternately, towards the end of 1855 he may have come in shipbuilder Henry Niccol's Moa, served a seven-year apprenticeship in his shipyard and then, presumably in 1862, volunteered for the wars. The latter fits better with the date of the war and the redoubt.

== Shipbuilding ==
Either way, he then partnered with another apprentice, John Sims as Sims and Brown, until 1890, after which he continued as a sole trader. Their first yard was on the North Shore, where, from February to June 1865, they built their first vessel, Telegraph, a 30 ton cutter. They added a yard at the foot of Princes Street. Later yards were at Devonport, near the foot of Hobson Street and in Poore Street, now Westhaven Drive, on the western reclamation. He built nearly fifty craft, including -

- Colonist schooner 1868
- Falcon, barquentine for Watt Brothers, Napier
- Leading Wind
- Manaroa for Captain Cross
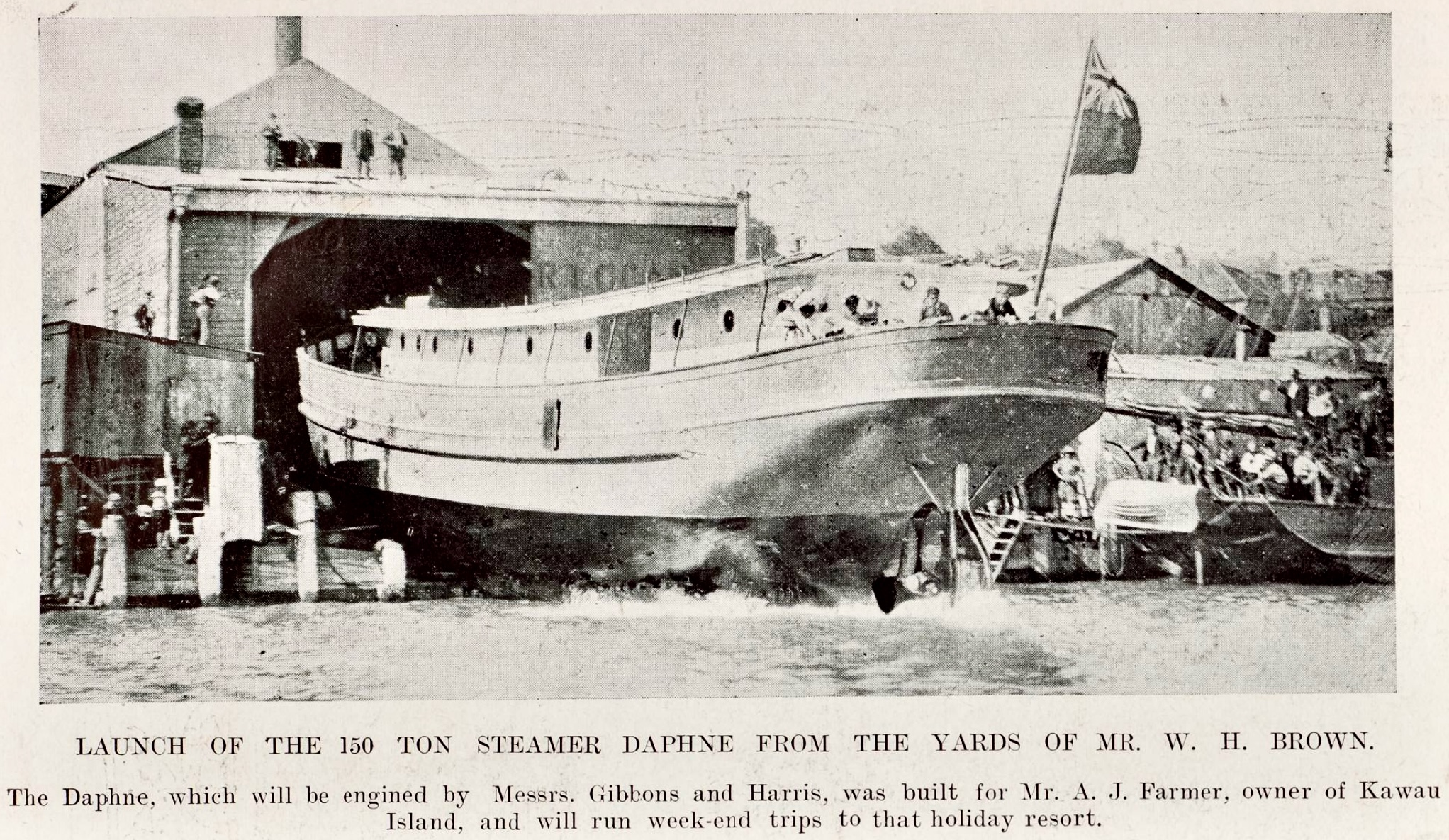
- Daphne launch in 1907
  Daphne steamer for A.J. Farmer, Kawau
- Noko, a pioneer in the Auckland-Gisborne trade
- Gemini, a steamer and other boats for Captain Jeremiah Casey (1820–1881)
- about 13 sailers, schooners, barques and barquentines for the island trading firm of Donald and Edenborough
- Sovereign and Lady Wynyard, which won schooner races at Anniversary Day regattas
- Onewa steamer
- Tiroa steamer.

== Local government ==
From 1863 he lived on the North Shore, where he was a Member of the Devonport Highway Board from 1876, until it merged into Devonport Borough Council in 1886. He was on it until 1894 and remained a member of Devonport Domain Board until at least 1902. Brown also represented the Council on Auckland Harbour Board for several years. He was largely responsible for Devonport having a promenade from the dock to North Head, ensured that its streets were a chain wide and properly formed before they were handed over and supported pumping water from Pupukemoana to a reservoir on Mount Victoria. He was president of the Master Shipbuilders’ Federation for many years, a Freemason Past Master and, for over thirty years, superintendent of the Church of England Devonport Sunday school.

== Personal life ==
Brown married Annie Binns on 24 October 1861. He was survived by her and their children - Walter, Frederick, Harold Brown, Mrs. T. Farquharson, Mrs. (Captain) Richards, Mrs. E. Pike, all of Auckland, Mrs. (Captain) Hardy, of Dunedin, 23 grandchildren and 13 great-grandchildren.
