= George Turnbull Niccol =

New Zealand shipbuilder and ship owner

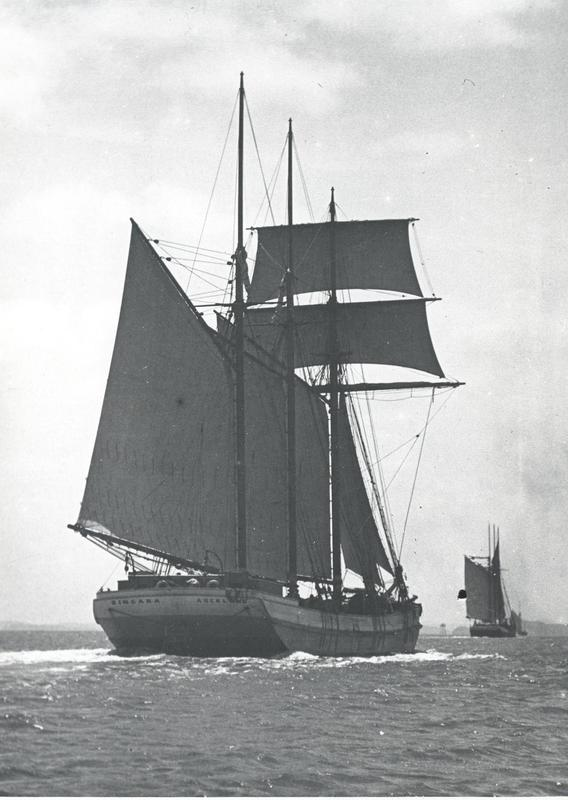
Schooner-rigged scow 'Zingara,' built in 1906 by Niccol

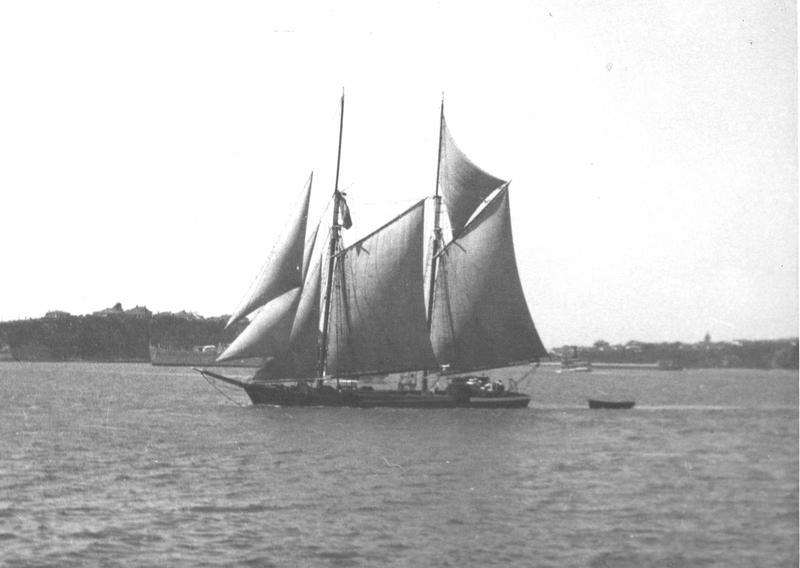
Schooner-rigged scow 'Combine,' built in 1910 by Niccol

George Turnbull Niccol (17 August 1858 – 28 September 1940) was a New Zealand shipbuilder and ship owner and son of Henry Niccol, the leading ship builder of Auckland.

== Early life ==
George Niccol was born on 17 August 1858 in Parnell, Auckland. He was the son of Sarah McLarty Niccol and Henry Niccol, who had nine sons including George, and five daughters.

Niccol grew up in Auckland, attending school in Devonport and subsequently joining his father in his Devonport shipbuilding yard.

== Career ==
The Niccol yard produced various types of wooden ships, both sail and steam. After Henry Niccol died in 1887, George Niccol became chiefly in charge of the yard. A decade after his fathers death, in 1897, Niccol moved the yard's premise across the harbour to Customs Street West, Freemans Bay in order to have greater room to build larger vessels.
