= HMT Kastoria =

Minesweeper used by the Royal Navy during the Second World War

History

United Kingdom
- Builder: Cook, Welton & Gemmill, Beverley
- Launched: 28 October 1916
- Completed: 15 January 1917
- Namesake: Kastoria
- Acquired: May 1941
- Commissioned: May 1941
- Decommissioned: April 1946
- In service: April 1946
- Fate: Scrapped in Poland, 1959

General characteristics
- Type: Naval trawler
- Displacement: 307 tons

HM Trawler Kastoria, pennant number 4.148, was a Royal Navy minesweeper during the Second World War. She was originally a commercial trawler but was requisitioned by the Admiralty in 1941 as a naval trawler and returned to her original owners in 1946.
