= French Flower-class corvette =

Class overview
- Operators: French Navy; Free French Naval Forces; Kriegsmarine; Royal Navy; United States Navy
- Completed: 22, plus 8 transferred
- Lost: 4

General characteristics (Flower-class corvette (original))
- Type: Corvette
- Displacement: 925 long tons (940 t; 1,036 short tons)
- Length: 205 ft (62.48 m) o/a
- Beam: 33 ft 11 1/2 in (10.35 m)
- Draught: 11 ft 6 in (3.51 m)
- Propulsion: 1939–1940 program; single shaft; 2 × fire tube Scotch boilers; 1 × 4-cycle triple-expansion reciprocating steam engine; 2,750 ihp (2,050 kW); 1940–1941 program; single shaft; 2 × 225 pounds per square inch (1,550 kPa) water tube boilers; 1 × 4-cylinder triple-expansion steam engine; 2,750 ihp (2,050 kW)
- Speed: 16 knots (29.6 km/h)
- Range: 5,000 nautical miles (9,260 km) at 9 knots (16.7 km/h); 3,500 nautical miles (6,482 km) at 12 knots (22.2 km/h); 2,900 nautical miles (5,371 km) at 15 knots (27.8 km/h)
- Complement: 79
- Sensors & processing systems: 1 × SW1C or 2C radar; 1 × Type 123A or Type 127DV sonar
- Armament: 1 × 4 inch BL Mk.IX single gun; (Fr: 1 × 100 mm naval gun, single); 2 × Vickers .50 machine guns (twin); (Fr: 2 × 13.2mm AA); 2 × .303 inch Lewis machine gun (twin); 2 × Mk.II depth charge throwers; 2 × depth charge rails with 40 depth charges; originally fitted with minesweeping gear, later removed

French Flower-class corvettes were those ships of the Flower class built for, or operated by, the French Navy and Free French Naval Forces in World War II. At the outbreak of the war, four anti-submarine warfare ships were ordered from a British shipyard, and a further 18 ships were later ordered from several British and French shipyards. Following the Fall of France in June 1940, the ships in Britain were taken over by the Royal Navy, while those in France fell into German hands. Eight other Flowers were later transferred to the Free French Naval Forces.

== Construction history ==
At the outbreak of World War II the Marine nationale (French Navy) needed ships for anti-submarine warfare (ASW) and, following the Royal Navy's example, placed orders from Smiths Dock in South Bank, Middlesbrough, for four ASW corvettes. Smiths had developed plans for a basic ASW vessel, using merchant ship equipment and machinery, that could be mass-produced in Merchant shipyards.

Following this the Marine nationale ordered a further 18 ships, to be built at a number of British and French shipyards. These were identical to the British "Flowers" except that French 100 mm (3.9 in) and 13.2 mm AA guns were to be fitted.

The Fall of France in June 1940 brought a drastic change to these building programmes. Of the original four, only one, La Bastiaise, was completed. On 22 June 1940, the day of France's capitulation, she was undergoing sea trials in the North Sea when she struck a mine off Hartlepool and sank. Of the others, La Malouine was taken over as she was by the Royal Navy (RN) on completion, while the other two were taken over and renamed.

Of the second order, the 12 ships under construction in Britain were taken over by the RN; all were renamed and given Flower names in keeping with the class.

The six ships under construction in France all fell into German hands. Building continued slowly, and by 1944, three had been completed for use by the German Kriegsmarine. These ships underwent a number of changes to reflect changes in role and circumstances. They were rated as patrol gunboats and commissioned as PA 1 to 4.

After the creation of the Free French Naval Forces (FNFL) the RN transferred a number of ships to the FNFL. These included eight Flowers, all transferred and renamed on completion. Some retained a Flower name while others took the names that honoured French naval heroes.

These ships, in French and in British service, saw action throughout the Atlantic campaign and performed sterling work. Two of the French, and one of the British vessels were lost in action, while three of them, two French and one British, were successful in sinking U-boats.

== Losses ==
- La Bastiaise, mined in North Sea, 22 June 1940 (on trials). The engineer manager of Smith's Dock and several of his staff were lost with the ship.
- La Dieppoise / HMS Fleur de Lys, torpedoed and sunk by U-206, 14 October 1941.
- Alysse, torpedoed and sunk by U-654 on 10 February 1942 while escorting convoy ON 60, approximately 420 nautical miles (780 km) east of Cape Race at 46°00′N 44°00′W. 36 crew were killed.
- Mimosa, torpedoed and sunk on 9 June 1942 by U-124 while escorting convoy ONS 100 at 52°12′N 32°37′W. 58 French and six British crew were killed; the French crew being largely from Saint Pierre and Miquelon. Four survivors were rescued by HMCS Assiniboine.

== Successes ==
- La Paimpolaise / Nasturtium, and others sank U-556 27 June 1941.
- Lobelia sank U-609 on 7 February 1943.
- Aconit and others sank U-432 and U-444 on 11 March 1943.

== Ships ==
=== French Navy (Marine nationale) ===
First order
Ship	Builder	Completed	Fate
La Bastiaise	Smiths Dock, South Bank, Middlesbrough	22 June 1940	Sunk by mine, 22 June 1940
La Malouine	Smiths Dock	30 July 1940	Transferred to RN as HMS La Malouine (K46)
La Dieppoise	Smiths Dock	26 August 1940	Transferred to RN as HMS Fleur de Lys (K122)
La Paimpolaise	Smiths Dock	26 September 1940	Transferred to RN as HMS Nasturtium (K107)

Second order, British yards
Ship	Builder	Completed	Fate
(J3840)	Harland & Wolff, Belfast	3 February 1941	Taken over by RN. Renamed HMS Abelia (K184)
(J3446)	Harland & Wolff	13 February 1941	Taken over by RN. Renamed HMS Alisma (K185)
(J3346)	Harland & Wolff	6 March 1941	Taken over by RN. Renamed HMS Anchusa (K186)
(J3444)	Harland & Wolff	30 March 1941	Taken over by RN. Renamed HMS Armeria (K187)
(J3246)	Harland & Wolff	11 April 1941	Taken over by RN. Renamed HMS Aster (K188)
(J3648)	Harland & Wolff	12 May 1941	Taken over by RN. Renamed HMS Bergamot (K189)
(J4002)	Smiths Dock	16 January 1941	Taken over by RN. Renamed HMS Snowdrop (K67)
(J4009)	Smiths Dock	18 November 1940	Taken over by RN. Renamed HMS Tulip (K29)
(J4020)	Smiths Dock	10 December 1940	Taken over by RN. Renamed HMS Verbena (K85)
(J4026)	Smiths Dock	18 February 1941	Taken over by RN. Renamed HMS Veronica (K37)
(J4030)	Smiths Dock	7 March 1941	Taken over by RN. Renamed HMS Wallflower (K44)
(J4034)	Smiths Dock	30 March 1941	Taken over by RN. Renamed HMS Zinnia (K98)

Second order, French yards
Ship	Builder	Completed	Fate
Arquebuse	Chantiere de St Nazaire-Penhoët	5 April 1944	Seized by Germany Completed as PA 1
Hallebarde	Chantiere de St Nazaire-Penhoët	September 1943	Seized by Germany Completed as PA 2
Sabre	Chantiere de St Nazaire-Penhoët	16 November 1943	Seized by Germany Completed as PA 3
Poignard	Chantiere de St Nazaire-Penhoët		Seized by Germany as PA 4
Tromblon	Ateliers et Chantiers de France, Dunkerque	—	Cancelled 1940 and broken up on stocks.
Javeline	Ateliers et Chantiers de France, Dunkerque	—	Cancelled 1940 and broken up on stocks.

=== Free French Navy (Forces navales françaises libres (FNFL)) ===
Flower-class corvettes transferred to the Free French Navy
Ship	Pennant no.	Builder	Completed	Renamed	Fate
Aconite	K58	Ailsa Shipbuilding Co. Ltd., Troon	23 July 1941	Aconit	Returned to RN, 30 April 1947.
Alyssum	K100	George Brown & Co., Greenock	17 June 1941	Alysse	Sunk by U-654, 10 February 1942
Lotus	K93	Charles Hill & Sons Ltd., Bristol	23 May 1942	Commandant d'Estienne d'Orves	Returned to RN, 31 May 1947.
Coriander	K183	Hall, Russell & Co., Aberdeen	16 September 1941	Commandant Detroyat	Returned to RN, 1947.
Chrysanthemum	K195	Harland & Wolff Ltd., Belfast	15 January 1942	Commandant Drogou	Returned to the RN, May 1947.
Lobelia	K05	Alexander Hall and Sons, Aberdeen	16 July 1941	Lobelia	Returned to the RN, April 1947.
Mimosa	K11	Charles Hill & Sons Ltd., Bristol	11 May 1941	Mimosa	Sunk by U-124, 9 June 1942
Ranunculus	K117	W. Simons & Co., Renfrew	28 July 1941	Renoncule	Returned to the RN, 1947.
Sundew	K57	J. Lewis & Sons Ltd., Aberdeen	19 September 1941	Roselys	Returned to RN, 1947.

== Sources ==
- Blair, Clay (2000) [1996]. Hitler's U-Boat War: The Hunters 1939–1942. Vol. 1. London: Cassell. ISBN 0-304-35260-8.
- Blair, Clay (2000) [1998]. Hitler's U-Boat War: The Hunted 1942–1945. Vol. 2. London: Cassell. ISBN 0-304-35261-6.
- Chesneau, Roger (1980). Conway's All the World's Fighting Ships 1922–1946. London: Conway Publishing. ISBN 0-85177-146-7.
- Elliott, Peter (1977). Allied Escort Ships of World War II. Macdonald and Jane's. ISBN 0-356-08401-9.
- Kemp, Paul (1997). U-Boats Destroyed. Arms & Armour. ISBN 1-85409-515-3.
- Le Masson, Henri (1969). The French Navy. Navies of the Second World War. Vol. 2. London: MacDonald & Co. (Publishers) Ltd. pp. 25–30. ISBN 9780356023847.
- Neistle, Axel (1998). German U-Boat Losses during World War II. Greenhill. ISBN 1-85367-352-8.
