= David Watson =

David or Dave Watson may refer to:

== Arts and entertainment ==
- David Watson (actor) (1940–2014), American actor
- David Watson (artist) (born 1944), English industrial painter
- Dave Watson (playwright) (c. 1946–1998), Scottish actor and playwright
- David R. Watson (born 1948), American bowyer and musician
- David Watson (New Zealand musician) (born 1960), New Zealand musician and composer
- David Watson (dancer) (born 1968), Swedish dancer
- David Watson (British musician), British record producer and singer

== Law and politics ==
- David K. Watson (1849–1918), American politician
- David Watson (New South Wales politician) (1870–1924), Australian politician
- David Watson (Queensland politician) (born 1945), Australian politician

== Science and medicine ==
- D. M. S. Watson (1886–1973), British palaeontologist
- David Paul Watson (fl. 1990), American botanist and cannabis breeder
- David M. Watson (born 1973), Australian ornithologist and ecologist
- David Watson (psychologist), American psychologist

== Sports ==
=== Association football (soccer) ===
- David Watson (footballer, born 1896) (1896–1978), Scottish footballer
- David Watson (footballer, born 1946), English footballer
- Dave Watson (born 1961), English footballer
- David Watson (footballer, born 1973), English football goalkeeper
- David Watson (footballer, born 2005), Scottish footballer

=== Rugby ===
- David Watson (rugby union) (1854–1906), Scottish rugby union player
- David Watson (1920s rugby league) (1900–1982), Australian rugby player
- Dave Watson (rugby league) (born 1966), New Zealand rugby league player

=== Other sports ===
- David Watson (cricketer) (1919–1943), English cricketer
- Dave Watson (American football) (1941–2021), American football player
- Dave Watson (racing driver) (born 1945), American racing driver
- Dave Watson (cyclist) (born 1946), Australian cyclist
- Dave Watson (ice hockey) (born 1958), Canadian ice hockey player
- David Watson (coach) (born 1976), American football coach

== Others ==
- David Watson (British Army officer) (1704–1761), Scottish army officer and military engineer
- Sir David Watson (general) (1869–1922), Canadian military general
- David Mowat Watson (1891–1972), British civil engineer
- David McCloy Watson (1902-1980), Irish accountant
- David C. C. Watson (1920–2004), English creationist and author
- David Joseph Watson (1923–1948), American murderer
- David Watson (evangelist) (1933–1984), English evangelist and author
- David Watson (academic) (1949–2015), British academic
- David Watson (anarchist) (born 1951), American anarchist author

== See also ==
- David Milne-Watson (1869–1945), Scottish industrialist
- Watson (surname)
