= PA-class patrol ship =

WWII era vessel class

Class overview
- Name: PA-class patrol ship
- Builders: Chantier de St Nazaire-Penhoët
- Operators: Kriegsmarine
- In service: 1944
- Planned: 6
- Completed: 3
- Canceled: 2
- Lost: 4

General characteristics
- Type: Corvette
- Displacement: 925 long tons (940 t; 1,036 short tons)
- Length: 205 ft (62.48 m) o/a
- Beam: 33 ft 11.5 in (10.35 m)
- Draught: 11 ft 6 in (3.51 m)
- Installed power: 2,750 ihp (2,050 kW)
- Propulsion: 1939–40 program; single shaft; 2 × 225 pounds per square inch (1,550 kPa) fire tube Scotch boilers; 1 × 4-cylinder triple-expansion steam engine
- Speed: 16 knots (29.6 km/h)
- Range: 5,000 nautical miles (9,300 km; 5,800 mi) at 9 knots (17 km/h; 10 mph); 3,500 nautical miles (6,500 km; 4,000 mi) at 12 knots (22 km/h; 14 mph); 2,900 nautical miles (5,400 km; 3,300 mi) at 15 knots (28 km/h; 17 mph)
- Complement: 85
- Armament: 1 × 10.5 cm (4.1 in) SK C/32 single gun; 2 × 3.7 cm (1.5 in) SK C/30 AA (twin); 2 × 2 cm (0.79 in) C/30 AA (quad); 2 × Mk.II depth charge throwers; 2 × depth charge rails with 40 depth charges; fitted with minesweeping gear

The Patrouillenboot Ausland ("patrol boat abroad") (PA)-class patrol ships were a class of vessels commissioned into the Kriegsmarine (German Navy) in the Second World War.

The ships were under construction in French shipyards that were seized by the Germans in 1940 at the Fall of France. Work on them continued under German control but progressed slowly, being subject to reluctance, or even sabotage, by the French workforce. Eventually only four were completed. The ships were commissioned in 1943–44 and deployed as escort vessels. Three were bombed and sunk by Royal Air Force (RAF) aircraft in 1944; the fourth was sunk as a block ship at Le Havre later the same year.

== Background ==
The PA-class patrol vessels were originally laid down as part of a 1939 order by the French Navy for anti-submarine warfare vessels to a British design, called Flower-class corvettes in the Royal Navy. They were adapted from a merchant ship design and were suitable for building at merchant yards.

Of the 18 ships ordered, 12 were under construction at British and six at French yards, four of which were at Chantier de St Nazaire-Penhoët. The order was overtaken by events, and none of the ships ordered was completed before the fall of France in June 1940. Saint-Nazaire, with four ships still under construction, fell into German hands, and as the town was in the occupied zone the Germans decided to complete the vessels for use by the German Kriegsmarine.

== Design ==
The PA-class ships differed in several respects from the original Smiths Dock design, and therefore from the Flower-class corvettes in service with the Allies. This reflects their construction history and their intended use. The PAs retained the short forecastle which was a feature of the original design, but which the Royal Navy found impractical in heavy weather. Later Allied vessels were given a longer forecastle, and the early ships were altered as they refitted. This did not happen with the PAs, which retained the un-weatherly short forecastle throughout their service careers. The PAs had another original feature, the enclosed merchant-style bridge, though it was abandoned in Allied ships.

The focus of the PA class's role was as inshore and coastal escorts, where the chief danger was from mines or attack by aircraft and small craft, such as motor torpedo boats and gunboats. A number of changes to their armament and layout were made to reflect this. The PAs were equipped with minesweeping gear, and to accommodate these items the upswept stern gunwale, a characteristic of the original design, was cut away, producing a flat quarterdeck and simple wire rails. The PAs also had an enhanced anti-aircraft (AA) armament; two sets of twin 37 mm AA guns were fitted in a flying bridge amidships and a set of quadruple 20 mm guns was fitted aft. They also had a 20 mm quadruple mount in a tub set on the roof of the bridge; given the Flowers' reputation for rolling in any seas, putting such a weight so high up would have done no good for their seaworthiness.

== Service history ==
On completion the four PAs had relatively short service careers. After a four-year building period, none of the ships was in service longer than nine months. The first to be completed, PA 2, joined 15. Vorpostenflottille ("15th Outpost Flotilla") in September 1943, and took part in general patrol and escort duties, protecting coastal traffic against air and small craft attack in the English Channel. She was joined by PA 3 in November 1943 and PA 1 in April 1944.

The ships took part in a number of naval actions. In September 1943 PA 2 was part of a force escorting the freighter Maladi in the Channel when they were attacked by Allied motor torpedo boats and motor gun boats. One escort was damaged in the action and Maladi was sunk. In January 1944 PA 3 was part of a force that escorted the blockade-runner Münsterland up the Channel, though Münsterland was protected from ships it was sunk by the coastal artillery at Dover. In February PA 2 and PA 3 were with a force that successfully fought off an attack on the tanker Reckum, bringing her safely to Le Havre. The tanker was later sunk by the Dover batteries.

In June 1944, during the Allied invasion of Normandy, German naval units in the area came under persistent air attack. During RAF air raids at Le Havre PA 2 - along with six other escorts - was sunk on 15 June and PA 3 was irreparably damaged on 15–16 June. PA 1 survived until August, but was abandoned when the flotilla fled the town ahead of the Allied advance. PA 4 was unfinished when Nantes was liberated. She was launched as La Télindière and sunk as a blockship in April 1945. She was raised and scrapped in 1946.

== Ships in class ==
PA-class patrol ships
| Ship | Builder | Original name | Completed | Fate |
|---|---|---|---|---|
| PA 1 | Penhoët | Arquebuse | 5 April 1944 | Abandoned 24 August 1944 |
| PA 2 | Penhoët | Hallebarde | September 1943 | Sunk, air attack 15 June 1944 |
| PA 3 | Penhoët | Sabre | 16 November 1943 | Damaged beyond repair, air attack 15–16 June 1944 |
| PA 4 | Penhoët | Poignard | Not completed | Scuttled incomplete August 1944, sunk as blockship, April 1945 |

== Bibliography ==
- Bock, Stephan (2003). "Flower Class Corvettes in Kriegsmarine Service".
- Chesneau, Roger (1980). Conway's All the World's Fighting Ships 1922–1946. London: Conway Publishing. ISBN 0-85177-146-7.
- Le Masson, Henri (1969). The French Navy. Navies of the Second World War. Vol. 2. London: MacDonald & Co. (Publishers) Ltd. pp. 25–30. ISBN 9780356023847.
