= David Watson (artist) =

- Born: 1944 (age 81–82); South Bank, Middlesbrough
- Education: Middlesbrough College
- Occupation: Artist
- Website: David Watson Official

David Watson is an artist and former shipyard worker born in 1944 at Albion Street, South Bank near Middlesbrough, UK. He attended Middlesbrough College where he studied art along with fellow South Bank artists Len Tabner and David Mulholland. At the age of nineteen earning a living became a priority and Watson went to work at Smiths Dock shipyard on the River Tees as a "red leader" painting the hulls of ships. Watson continued with his art for decades although remained largely unknown until the Kirkleatham Museum in Redcar submitted images of his work to the BBC's "Your Painting" website (became Art UK). In 2012 they were noticed by Mark Parham who now acts as Watson's curator. In 2014 the National Football Museum in Manchester acquired Watson's "Matchday at Ayresome Park" (Middlesbrough FC).

Watson's work depicts industrial scenes of his native Teesside inspired by his recollections, some of the work is literal while others contain figures Watson describes as ghosts and relics of a time long since gone.

== Selected exhibitions ==
2020 - David Watson: Belonging (Solo Exhibition), Dorman Museum, Middlesbrough, UK

2016/17 - Steel Flesh and Bone: The Industrial Paintings of David Watson (Solo Exhibition), Woodhorn Museum, Ashington, Northumberland, UK

2016 - Cotton and Steel, Salford Museum and Art Gallery, Salford, UK

2016 - Teesside World Exposition of Art and Technology, Middlesbrough Institute of Modern Art (mima), UK

2014 - Beyond The Wilderness Road (Solo Exhibition), Constantine Gallery, Teesside University, Middlesbrough, UK

2014 - Beyond The Wilderness Road (Solo Exhibition), McGuinness Gallery, Bishop Auckland, UK

2012 - Land Sea and Air, Kirkleatham Museum, Redcar, UK

== Collections ==
National Football Museum, Manchester. UK

Kirkleatham Museum, Redcar. UK
