= HMS Europa =

Six ships and two shore establishments of the Royal Navy have been named HMS Europa, after the Greek mythological character Europa.

- HMS Europa (1673) was a hulk, a former Dutch ship captured in 1673. She was burnt by accident in 1675.
- HMS Europa (1765) was a 64-gun third rate launched in 1765. She was renamed HMS Europe in 1778 and was broken up in 1814.
- HMS Europa (1782) was a gunboat commissioned in 1782. She was one of 12 that the garrison at Gibraltar launched during the Great Siege of Gibraltar. Each was armed with an 18-pounder gun, and received a crew of 21 men drawn from Royal Navy vessels stationed at Gibraltar. Porcupine provided Europa's crew.
- HMS Europa (1783) was a 50-gun fourth rate launched in 1783. She became a troopship in 1798 and was sold in 1814.
- HMS Europa (1854) was a transport hired in 1854.
- HMS Europa (1897) was a Diadem-class cruiser launched in 1897 and sold in 1920.
- HMS Europa (shore establishment) was the name of the Central Depot for the Royal Naval Patrol Service in Lowestoft from early in the Second World War until she was decommissioned in 1946. It was originally the garden of a private house and was called Sparrows Nest. When first opened in September 1939 it was called Pembroke X.
- HMS Europa II (shore establishment), RNAS Bungay, Nr. Lowestoft, Suffolk from September 1945 to May 1946, as a satellite airfield to RNAS Halesworth.
