= HMS Alisma =

Flower-class corvette

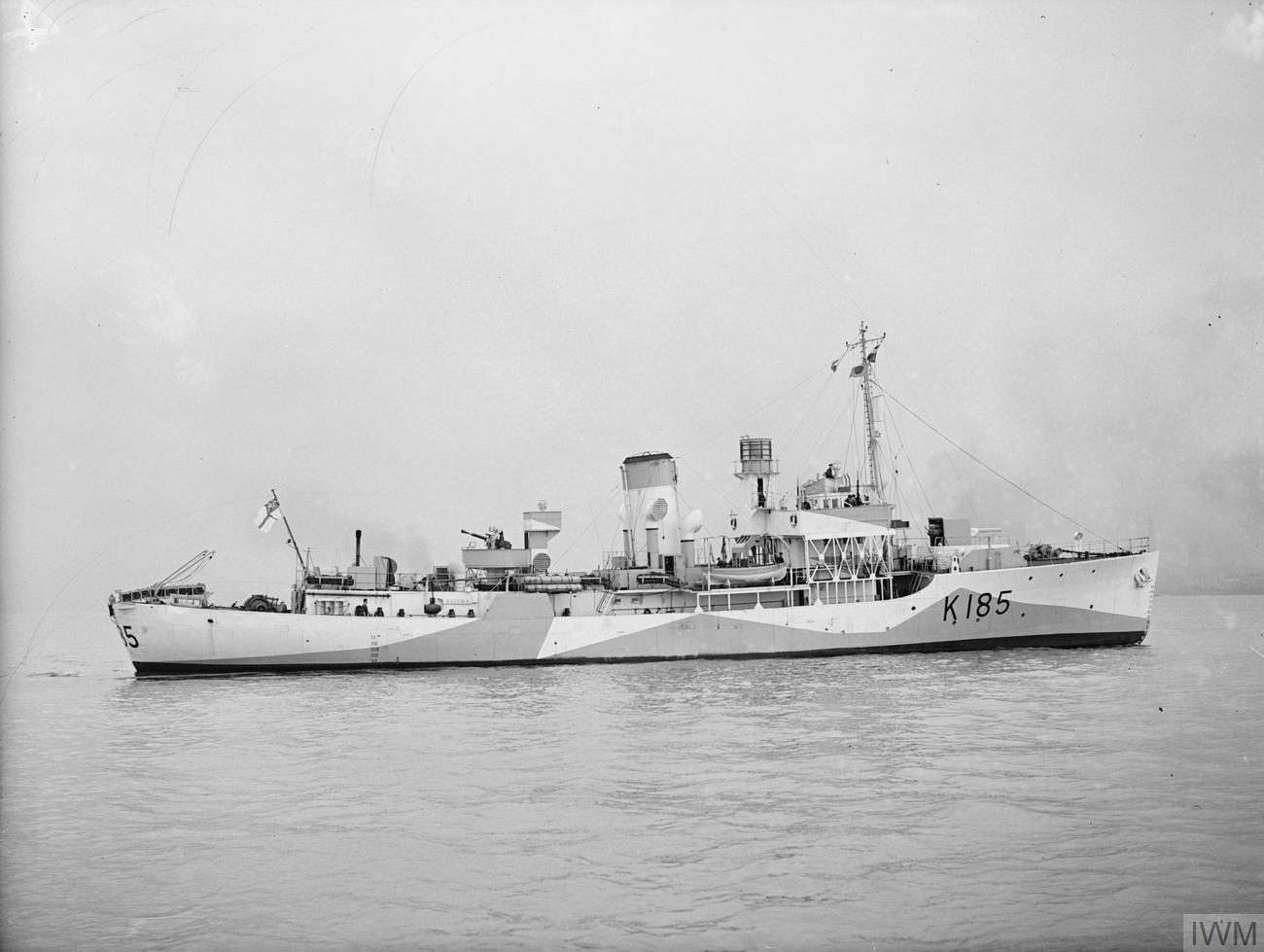

History

United Kingdom
- Name: HMS Alisma
- Builder: Harland and Wolff, Belfast
- Yard number: 1096
- Laid down: 19 August 1940
- Launched: 17 December 1940
- Completed: 13 February 1941
- Commissioned: 15 February 1941
- Decommissioned: 11 June 1945
- Identification: Pennant number: K185
- Fate: Sold 1947. Sunk 1954.

General characteristics
- Class & type: Flower-class corvette
- Displacement: 925 long tons
- Length: 205 ft (62 m) o/a
- Beam: 33 ft (10 m)
- Draught: 11 ft 6 in (3.51 m)
- Propulsion: 1 × 4-cycle triple-expansion reciprocating steam engine; 2 × fire tube Scotch boilers; Single shaft; 2,750 ihp (2,050 kW)
- Speed: 16 kn (30 km/h)
- Range: 3,500 nmi (6,500 km) at 12 kn (22 km/h)
- Complement: 85
- Sensors & processing systems: 1 × SW1C or 2C radar; 1 × Type 123A or Type 127DV sonar
- Armament: 1 × BL 4-inch (101.6 mm) Mk.IX gun; 2 × Vickers .50 cal machine gun (twin); 2 × Lewis .303 cal machine gun (twin); 2 × Mk.II Depth charge throwers; 2 × Depth charge rails with 40 depth charges

Service record
- Commanders: 1941 A/Lt.Cdr. M.G. Rose, RANVR; 1943 Lt. G. Lanning, RANVR
- Operations: Battle of the Atlantic; Battle of the Mediterranean

HMS Alisma (K185) was a Flower-class corvette that served in the Royal Navy.

== Background ==
At the outbreak of World War II the Marine nationale (French Navy) needed ships for anti-submarine warfare (ASW) and, following the Royal Navy's example, placed orders from Smith’s Dock in South Bank, Middlesbrough, for four ASW corvettes. Following this the Marine nationale ordered a further 18 ships, to be built at a number of British and French shipyards; 6 were built by Harland and Wolff in Belfast. The Fall of France in June 1940 brought a drastic change to these building programmes. Of the second order, the 12 ships under construction in Britain were taken over by the RN and re-armed with British ordnance; all of these French corvettes were renamed and given 'Flower' names in keeping with the class. Alisma was laid down as Yard No. 1096, and originally intended as the French Pertuisane.

HMS Alisma (and HMS Burdock) wore a yellow and blue pattern of ship camouflage in the Atlantic. The colour faded quickly in service, becoming a yellow-tinged, off-white colour.

== Officers and crew ==
During her service with the Royal Navy she was commanded by Acting Lieutenant Commander Maurice George Rose, RANVR from 2 May 1941 to 1 May 1943. He was succeeded by Lieutenant George Lanning, RANVR until 11 June 1945. The RANVR was a volunteer reserve force of the Royal Australian Navy.

Rose, as a Lieutenant, joined HMS Erica building at Harland and Wolff in Belfast. The ship was commissioned in August 1940. Promotion to Acting Lieutenant Commander with seniority from 4 October 1940 aroused in the 38 year old thoughts of his own command. Rose wrote to the Admiralty informing them that he would like promotion, not to a trawler, but a new corvette from Harland and Wolff with all his officers to be Australian Reservists; he also requested that his anti-submarine ratings be Australians. The specific request for a Harland and Wolff ship had come after a study of vessels from various yards convinced him of the superiority of that company’s craft. My Lords of the Admiralty, surprisingly, had granted his request when Rose commissioned HMS Alisma on 14 February 1941.

== Service history ==
=== Battle of the Atlantic ===
In 1941 Western Approached Command had formed 8 escort groups. The 1st Escort Group consisted of six destroyers and four Flower-class corvettes. They were soon in action with other groups between 19 July – 1 August 1941 with Convoy ON 69 defending 26 merchant ships from 8 U-boats and 2 Italian submarines.

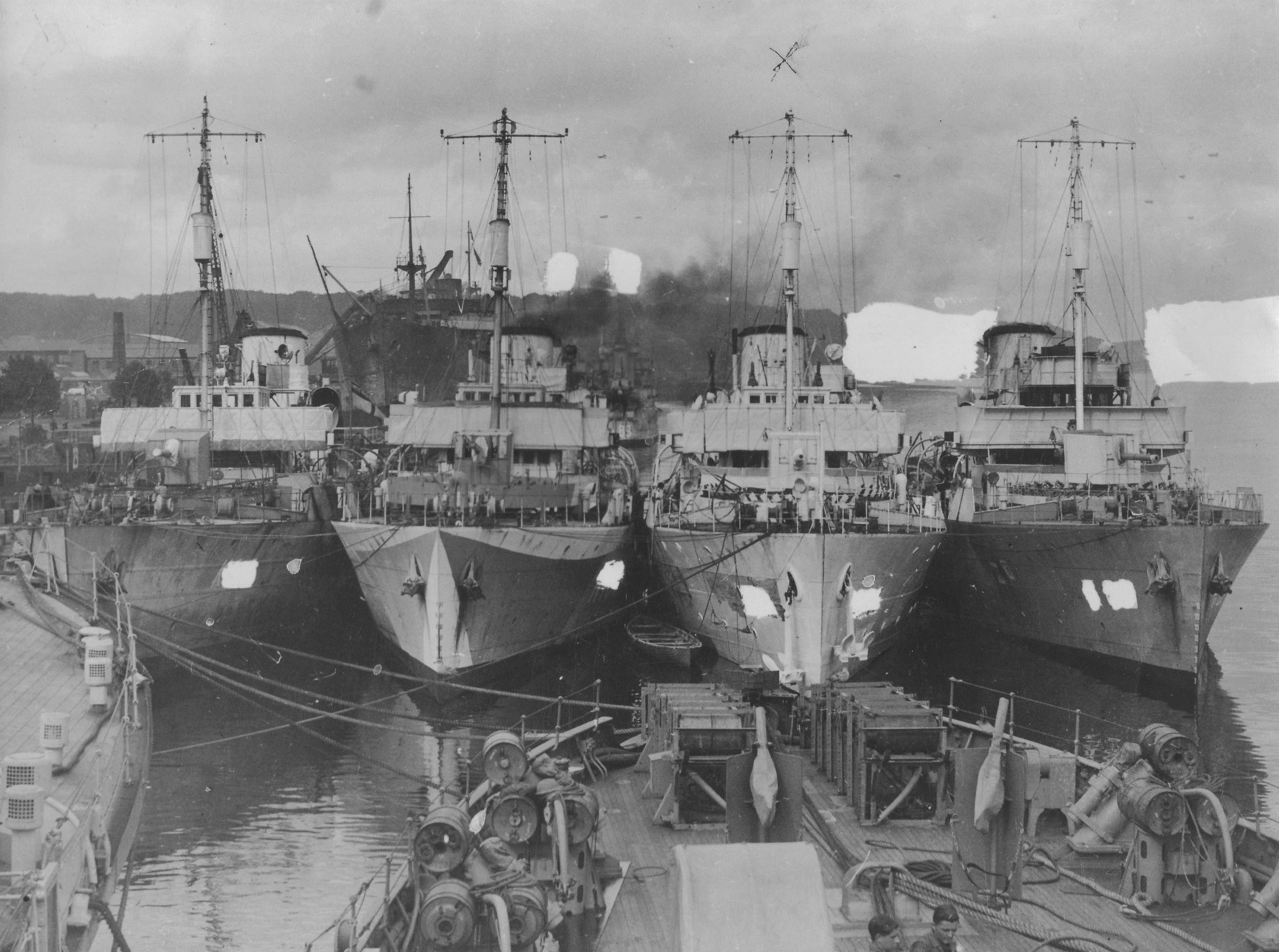
Corvettes of B7 Group moored in Londonderry. Alisma, Dianella, Sunflower & Kingcup. The white areas are where the official censor has painted out security sensitive material

In February and March 1942 the original eight escort groups were reorganized into the Mid-Ocean Escort Force (MOEF). Alisma was part of Escort Group B7, one of seven such British naval groups which served with the Mid-Ocean Escort Force (MOEF). It provided convoy protection in the most dangerous midsection of the North Atlantic route. B7's first convoys, in the spring of 1942, were uneventful, and as the pace of the Battle of the Atlantic hotted up in the summer and autumn, the group's charges were escorted without loss. But in December, while escorting ON 153, the convoy came under attack, and three ships were sunk. During this action, on 11 December, Firedrake was torpedoed by the U-boat U-211 and sank with the loss of 168 of her crew, including her current commander, and the group's Senior Officer – Escort (SOE), Commander Eric Tilden. Initially 35 survived the torpedoing, but only 27 managed to get on board Sunflower, which was under the command of Lieut- Commander John Treasure Jones.

B7 was involved in the battles for convoys ONS 20 and ON 206, ON 207 and ON 208, during which period nine U-boats were destroyed.

=== Battle of the Mediterranean ===
From autumn 1943 until April 1945 Alisma was deployed in the Mediterranean escorting KMS and MKS convoys. The KMS series of mercantile convoy sailed from the UK to Gibraltar and onward into the Mediterranean from October 1942. The MKS series of convoy replaced the earlier HG series and ran from the Mediterranean to the UK via Gibraltar. The new series was introduced after Operation Torch in October 1942 and operated until May 1945.

She then returned to the North Atlantic until the end of the war, escorting convoys between Liverpool and New York.

== Post-WW II ==
Alisma was decommissioned on 11 June 1945 and sold in 1947. After conversion to a 724 GRT merchant cargo ship, including replacement of her steam machinery with diesel, she entered service in 1949 as Laconia for Compañia Marítima Mensabe SA, and was registered in Panama. In 1950 she was purchased by K. Samartzopoulos of Piraeus, where she was registered, and renamed Constantinos S. She was resold in 1952 to D. Efthimiou, also of Piraeus, and renamed Parnon. On 16 July 1954 she sank in position 40.15°N 13.20°E, south west of Naples, as a result of water leakage (flooding) during a voyage from Marseille for Eleusis with a cargo of ammonium sulphate.

== Sources ==
- McCluskie, Tom (2013). The Rise and Fall of Harland and Wolff. The History Press. ISBN 9780752488615.
- Elliott, Peter (1977). Allied Escort Ships of World War II. Macdonald and Jane's. ISBN 0-356-08401-9.
- Donaldson, Graham. "Royal Australian Naval Volunteer Reserve". The World at War.
- Nunan, Peter (2005). HMAS Diamantina: Australia's last river class frigate, 1945-1980. Slouch Hat Publications. ISBN 978-0957975279.
- Treasure Jones, John (2008). Tramp to Queen. The History Press. ISBN 978-0-7524-4625-7.
