= K210 =

K210 or K-210 may refer to:

- K-210 (Kansas highway), a former state highway in Kansas
- HMS Thyme (K210), a former UK Royal Navy ship
