= HMT Arab =

History

United Kingdom
- Name: Arab (H293)
- Owner: Hellyer Brothers Ltd., Hull
- Builder: Smiths Dock Company, South Bank, Middlesbrough
- Yard number: 1006
- Launched: 19 June 1936
- Completed: August 1936
- Fate: To the Admiralty, 12 September 1939

United Kingdom
- Name: HMT Arab (FY202)
- Acquired: 12 September 1939
- Commissioned: 23 October 1939
- Fate: Returned to owners, 17 November 1945

United Kingdom
- Name: Arab
- Owner: Prince Fishing Co. Ltd. (1945-1947); Loch Fishing Co., Ltd. (1947-1963)
- Renamed: Loch Seaforth (1947)
- Fate: Scrapped, 1963

General characteristics
- Type: Naval trawler
- Tonnage: 579 GRT; 214 NRT
- Length: 170.7 ft (52.0 m)
- Beam: 28.1 ft (8.6 m)
- Draught: 14.8 ft (4.5 m)
- Propulsion: Compound engine, 99 hp (74 kW)

HM Trawler Arab was a trawler launched in 1936. At the outbreak of World War II, she became a naval trawler serving in the Royal Naval Patrol Service (RNPS; aka "Harry Tate's Navy" or "Churchill's Pirates"). Lieutenant Richard Been Stannard won the Victoria Cross (VC) while serving as her commander during the Namsos campaign in 1940. The Admiralty returned her to her owners in 1945 and she remained in commercial service until she was scrapped at Ghent in 1963.

== Trawler ==
Arab was built by Smith's Dock Co. of South Bank-on-Tees, Middlesbrough, with hull name Arab H293. (Smith's Dock Company also built a number of other trawlers that would serve in the RNPS such as Phyllis Rosalie, which became HMT Amethyst.) Arab had a displacement of 531 tons. She was launched 19 June 1936 and worked as a trawler for her owners, Hellyer Brothers Ltd., of Hull.

== War service ==
The Admiralty commissioned her in September 1939 with the pennant number FY202, equipping and arming her for anti-submarine warfare. Lieutenant Richard Been Stannard Royal Navy Reserve became her captain.

On 12 March 1940, Arab was escorting a convoy during which the German air force bombed SS Statira. For his actions, Stannard received a mention in despatches.

In late April 1940, the Admiralty sent the 15th Anti-Submarine Striking Force, under Lieutenant Commander Sir Geoffrey Congreve, to Namsos, Norway, about 100 miles north of Trondheim. The task force was to evacuate troops that had landed there on 14 April as part of the unsuccessful Namsos Campaign.

During the five days, 28 April to 2 May, that Arab was in the fjord, she endured 24 dive bomber attacks, and seven higher altitude (8000 or 10,000 feet) bombing attacks. The Luftwaffe sank three other naval trawlers from A/S SF 15 at Namsfjord: Aston Villa, Gaul and St. Goran.

On 3 May, as Arab was leaving Namsos, taking St. Goran’s crew with her, Arab managed to shoot down a Heinkel He 115 that had ordered her to ‘steer east (i.e., back to Namsos and captivity) or be sunk’. Stannard then brought Arab safely home in spite of her damaged engines. It was for his actions and leadership during the five days at Namsos that Stannard received the VC.

Arab, with Stannard in command, served at the Dunkirk evacuation during 26 May and 4 June 1940. On 29 June 1940, the Admiralty promoted Stannard to lieutenant commander, RNR. At the end of the year he left Arab and went on to command destroyers, earning a DSO (Distinguished Service Order) while captain of HMS Vimy.

On 29 January 1941, Arab, under the command of Lieutenant C.A. Shillan, was escorting Convoy SC 19. About 150 miles south west of Rockall, U-93 was able to torpedo W.B. Walker. Arab came to the aid of the torpedoed vessel, and together with HMS Anthony, took her into tow. Walker eventually broke in half and sank, but Arab landed her master and 42 crew members (four had been lost in the torpedoing), at Gourock.

== Trawler and fate ==
In 1945, the Admiralty returned Arab to her owners, Prince Fishing Co. Ltd., (Owen S. Hellyer, Manager). In 1947 Loch Fishing Co., Ltd., of Hull, bought her and renamed her Loch Seaforth. Loch Fishing operated her until she arrived at Ghent, Belgium on 6 April 1963. There Van Heyghen Frères scrapped her.
