= K185 =

K185 or K-185 may refer to:

- K-185 (Kansas highway), a state highway in Kansas
- HMS Alisma (K185), a former UK Royal Navy ship
