= HMS Verbena (K85) =

Flower-class corvette

History

United Kingdom
- Name: HMS Verbena
- Ordered: 25 July 1939
- Builder: Smiths Dock Company, South Bank-on-Tees
- Laid down: 29 June 1940
- Launched: 1 October 1940
- Commissioned: 19 December 1940
- Identification: Pennant number: K85
- Motto: Virtute bene donata: 'Well endowed with Valour'
- Honours and awards: Atlantic 1941
- Fate: Scrapped from 1 October 1951
- Badge: On a Field White a Verbena Flower proper with halo Gold.

General characteristics
- Class & type: Flower-class corvette
- Displacement: 925 long tons (940 t; 1,036 short tons)
- Length: 205 ft (62.5 m)o/a
- Beam: 33 ft (10.1 m)
- Draught: 11.5 ft (3.51 m)
- Propulsion: single shaft; 2 × fire tube Scotch boilers; 1 × double acting triple-expansion reciprocating steam engine; 2,750 ihp (2,050 kW)
- Speed: 16 knots (29.6 km/h)
- Range: 3,500 nautical miles (6,482 km) at 12 knots (22.2 km/h)
- Complement: 85
- Sensors & processing systems: 1 × SW1C or 2C radar; 1 × Type 123A or Type 127DV sonar
- Armament: 1 × 4 inch BL Mk.IX single gun; 2 × Vickers .50 machine guns (twin); 2 × .303 inch Lewis machine gun (twin); 2 × Mk.II depth charge throwers; 2 × Depth charge rails with 40 depth charges; Minesweeping gear

HMS Verbena was a Flower-class corvette of the Royal Navy during the Second World War. She was launched in 1940, served in the Battle of the Atlantic, and was scrapped in 1951.

== Construction ==
Assigned the pennant number K85, Verbena was built by Smiths Dock Company, South Bank-on-Tees and was laid down on 29 June 1940, initially under contract for the French Navy. She was launched on 1 October 1940, began acceptance trials on 5 December 1940 and was subsequently commissioned on 19 December 1940 into the Royal Navy. She undertook working-up exercises at the Royal Navy's Anti-Submarine Training Base at HMS Western Isles, Tobermory and was certified as suitable for ocean escort duty on 30 December 1940.

== Service ==
Verbena had the distinction of being the first corvette to be commanded by an officer of the Royal Naval Volunteer Reserve, Lieutenant-Commander Denys Rayner, from November 1940 until September 1942. She was also the first Flower-class corvette to be installed with an extended forecastle to improve stability at sea.

She joined her first convoy, under the command of Rayner, on 5 January 1941 and duly escorted the merchantmen up to the 20°W, before returning (then the limit for ocean escorts). After escorting two more convoys, she was assigned to the Mid-Ocean Escort Force, Escort Group B12, based out of Londonderry. On 1 February 1941, after landing survivors from a sunken merchantman, she was taken to the Clyde for fitting with minesweeping gear.

She then sailed on escort duties to Gibraltar before returning to duties in the Atlantic which included a stint escorting Convoy HX 126 which had come under attack from a total of eleven U-boats (the convoy losing nine merchantmen in the process).

On 4 September 1941, she was refitted at Grangemouth and had a Type 271 Radar set fitted, taken from the battlecruiser HMS Renown. Following this she sailed for escort duties operating from Freetown. Following further operations in Cape Town, she sailed to join the Eastern Fleet at Colombo where on 25 April 1942 was declared non-operational with a major boiler defect, only being declared fit for further service on 6 February 1943.

Further transfers saw her assigned to the Indian Ocean Escort Force, again to the Eastern Fleet, then to the East Indies Fleet, then finally in September 1945 to the Reserve Fleet based at Milford Haven and was placed on the Reserve list.

== Fate ==
She was placed on the Disposal list and was sold to Swedish shipping firm AB Tore Holmes for conversion into a merchantman. Her conversion was never undertaken and she was finally sold, being scrapped at Blyth from 1 October 1951.
