= HMS Tulip (K29) =

Former British Royal Navy Flower-class corvette

History

United Kingdom
- Name: HMS Tulip
- Ordered: 31 August 1939
- Builder: Smiths Dock Company, South Bank, Middlesbrough
- Laid down: 30 May 1940
- Launched: 4 September 1940
- Commissioned: 18 November 1940
- Out of service: Sold in May 1947
- Renamed: Olympic Conqueror in 1950; Otori Maru No.8 in 1956; Thorlyn in 1957
- Reclassified: Whaling ship between 1950 and 1964
- Identification: Pennant number: K29
- Fate: Scrapped in 1965

General characteristics
- Class & type: Flower-class corvette
- Displacement: 925 long tons (940 t)
- Length: 205 ft (62 m)
- Beam: 33 ft (10 m)
- Draught: 11.5 ft (3.5 m)
- Propulsion: Two fire tube boilers; one 4-cycle triple-expansion steam engine
- Speed: 16 knots (30 km/h) at 2,750 hp (2,050 kW)
- Range: 3,500 nautical miles at 12 knots (6,500 km at 22 km/h)
- Complement: 85 men
- Armament: 1 × BL 4-inch (101.6 mm) Mk IX gun, two .50 inch (12.7 mm) twin machine guns, two .303 inch (7.7-mm) Lewis machine guns; two stern depth charge racks with 40 depth charges

HMS Tulip was a Flower-class corvette that served in the Royal Navy. The corvette was launched by Smiths Dock Company on 4 September 1940 and was commissioned into the Royal Navy on 18 November 1940.

== Civilian service ==
She was sold in 1947 and rebuilt as the whaling ship Olympic Conqueror in 1950. She was seized in 1954 by Peruvian warships and was sold to Japan in 1956 as the Otori Maru No. 8. In 1957 she was sold to Thor Dahl AS and renamed Thorlyn. In 1962 she was laid up in Sandefjord and then sold in 1964 at Gothenburg, Sweden. She was scrapped in Germany in 1965.
