= HMS Thyme =

Flower-class corvette

History

United Kingdom
- Name: HMS Thyme
- Namesake: Thyme
- Builder: Smiths Dock Company
- Laid down: 30 April 1941
- Launched: 25 July 1941
- Commissioned: 23 October 1941
- Identification: Pennant number: K210
- Fate: Sold 1947 as Weather ship Weather Explorer, scrapped 1962

General characteristics
- Class & type: Flower-class corvette

HMS Thyme (K210) was a Flower-class corvette which served in the Royal Navy during the Second World War. Laid down by Smiths Dock Company in April 1941, she was launched in July 1941, and commissioned in October 1941.

== Background ==
Thyme was one of six Flower-class corvettes ordered on 3 August 1940. She was laid down at Smith Dock's South Bank, Middlesbrough shipyard on 30 April 1941, was launched on 25 July 1941 and completed on 23 October 1941.

== Royal Navy service ==
Thyme began escorts on 21 November 1941, with the convoy HX 161, from Halifax, Nova Scotia to Liverpool. She spent most of her remaining career escorting convoys around the Indian Ocean and Africa.

== Service after the Royal Navy ==
She was transferred to the Air Ministry for civilian service in 1947 and was designated the Weather ship, Weather Explorer. In 1958 she was sold again and became the Greek merchant ship Epos
