= French corvette La Bastiaise =

Flower-class corvette

La Bastiaise
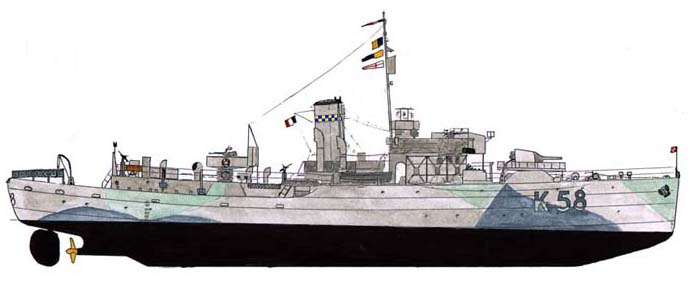
- Flower-class corvette in 1942 paint

History

France
- Name: La Bastiaise
- Laid down: 18 November 1939
- Launched: 8 April 1940
- Commissioned: 22 June 1940
- Identification: Pennant number: J4138
- Fate: Sunk 22 June 1940

General characteristics
- Class & type: Flower-class corvette
- Displacement: 950 tonnes
- Length: 62.7 m (205 ft 9 in)
- Beam: 10.9 m (35 ft 9 in)
- Draught: 2.7 m (8 ft 10 in)
- Propulsion: Engine: 4-cylinder triple-expansion steam engine; Fuel: Gazole; Pressure: 225 PSI; Power: 2,750 hp (2,050 kW)
- Speed: 16 knots (30 km/h; 18 mph)
- Range: 3,450 nmi (6,390 km; 3,970 mi) at 12 knots (22 km/h; 14 mph); 2,630 nmi (4,870 km; 3,030 mi) at 16 knots (30 km/h; 18 mph); Fuel capacity: 230 tonnes
- Complement: 70
- Sensors & processing systems: Type 271 surface radar
- Armament: 1 BL 4-inch (101.6 mm) Mark IX gun; 1 Mark VIII 40 mm gun; 2 Mark IIA 20 mm guns; 2 Hotchkiss machine guns; 4 Mark I depth charge launchers; 2 ramps for Mark I depth charges; 60 depth charges

La Bastiaise was a Flower-class corvette of the French Navy (Marine nationale). The ship was built by the British shipyard Smiths Dock in their Middlesbrough shipyard, and was completed in June 1940, just before the French Armistice with Germany. She was sunk by a mine on 22 June 1940 during sea trials.

The name La Bastiaise was in honour of the inhabitants of the city of Bastia, Corsica.

== War service ==
At the outbreak of World War II the Marine nationale (French Navy) needed urgently ships for anti-submarine warfare (ASW) convoy escort and placed orders from Smiths Dock in South Bank, Middlesbrough for four Flower-class corvettes. Following this the Marine nationale ordered a further 18 ships, to be built both in British and French shipyards. These French Flower-class ships were identical to the British "Flowers" except that French 100 mm (3.9 in) and 13.2 mm AA guns were to be fitted.

On 22 June 1940, the day of France's capitulation, La Bastiase was undergoing sea trials in the North Sea when she struck a mine off Hartlepool and sank. The night before Luftwaffe planes had been dropping magnetic mines into the shallow coastal waters. Forty-three French sailors died, along with at least 18 British shipyard workers. La Bastiase was not part of FFL Navy as she was serving under the Marine nationale flag but France surrendered on the day of her loss. Her commander, Lieutenant de Vaisseau Georges Albert Lacombe, died in the sinking.

== Legacy ==
A memorial obelisk, with the names of all those who died when La Bastiaise hit a mine whilst on trials off the River Tees was dedicated at a service in Smiths Dock Park on Saturday 7 November 2015.

The crew members that died are remembered among the Forces Navales Françaises Libres members that died in the war.

== See also ==
- List of Escorteurs of the French Navy

== Sources ==
- Cherry, OBE, Cdr. Alex H. (1951). Yankee R.N.: Being the story of a Wall Street banker who volunteered for active duty in the Royal Navy before America came into the war. London: Jarrolds. pp. not cited.
- Gardiner, Robert; Chesneau, Roger, eds. (1980). Conway's All The World's Fighting Ships 1922–1946. London: Conway Maritime Press. ISBN 0-85177-146-7.
- Lambert, John; Brown, Les (2008). ShipCraft Special: Flower Class Corvettes. St. Catharines, Ontario, Canada: Vanwall Publishing Limited. ISBN 978-1-55068-986-0.
- Le Masson, Henri (1969). The French Navy. Navies of the Second World War. Vol. 2. London: MacDonald & Co. (Publishers) Ltd. pp. 25, 28. ISBN 0356023842.
