= Smith's Dock Company =

British shipbuilding company

- Type: Private
- Industry: Shipbuilding
- Founded: 1810
- Defunct: 1987
- Fate: Acquired
- Successor: Swan Hunter
- Headquarters: South Bank, UK

Smith's Dock Company, Limited, often referred to simply as Smith's Dock, was a British shipbuilding company.

== History ==
The company was originally established by Thomas Smith who bought William Rowe's shipyard at St. Peter's in Newcastle upon Tyne in 1810 and traded as William Smith & Co. The company opened its dock in North Shields in 1851. One of the first ships to be launched at the yard was Termagent in 1852. The company changed its name to Smith's Dock Co. in 1891.

The company became associated with South Bank, North Riding of Yorkshire, after opening an operation there in 1907. Smith's Dock increasingly concentrated its shipbuilding business on the River Tees in South Bank, with its North Shields Yard being used mainly for repair work (in particular oil tankers) from 1909 onwards. Despite the shift of focus, the company's headquarters remained at North Shields.

Smith's Dock built many ships that served during the Second World War, including trawlers that the Admiralty requisitioned and converted to armed trawlers of the Royal Naval Patrol Service such as HMT Amethyst, or HMT Arab, in which Lieutenant Richard Stannard (RNR) won the Victoria Cross.

The yard also built Tree-class trawlers for the Royal Navy including HMT Walnut, which later became a famous refugee ship in Canada. Of the 20 of this class built for the Royal Navy, four were built by Smith's Dock.

Tree-class trawlers
Name	Pennant	Laid down	Launched	Completed
HMT Rowan	T119	13 June 1939	12 August 1939	14 December 1939
HMT Walnut	T103	15 June 1939	12 August 1939	13 December 1939
HMT Wisteria	T113	19 July 1939	10 November 1939	16 February 1940
HMT Whitehorn	T127	25 July 1939	10 November 1939	28 February 1940

== Flower-class corvettes ==
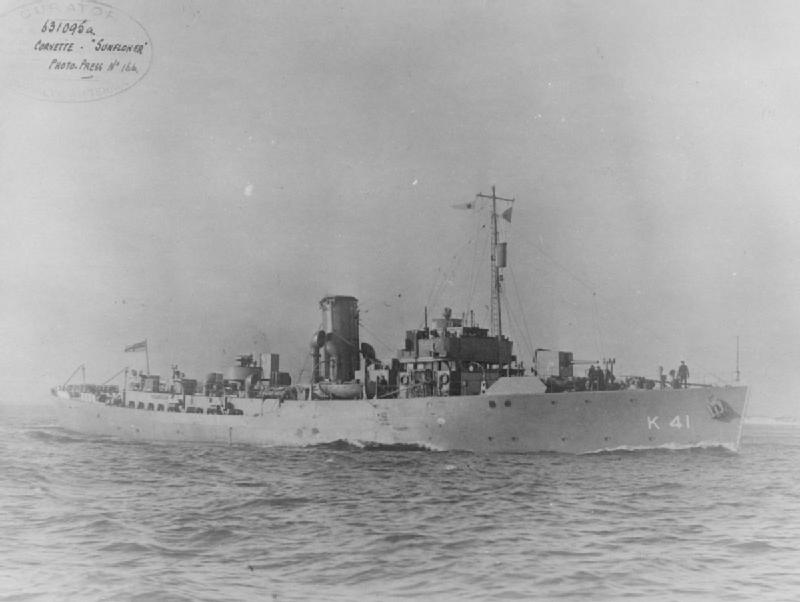
1941 Flower-class corvette

Smith's Dock are perhaps most famous for preparing the design of the Flower-class corvette, an anti-submarine convoy escort of the Second World War celebrated in the novel The Cruel Sea.

In January 1939, William Reed of Smith's Docks Co. was approached by the British Admiralty with a request for a design of a cheap and simple multi-role warship capable of being built in the multitude of small civilian shipyards not usually accustomed to building to naval standards. Smith Docks was highly regarded by the Admiralty because it had designed the Z-class whaler during World War I and was famed for its reputation for the construction of whale-catchers. Reed's resultant design suggestion was based on a larger version of the company's new whaler, Southern Pride, with a number of modifications. The length, for instance, was increased by 30 feet to give a higher speed, and two marine oil-fired boilers were to be fitted as these could be supplied in about 16 weeks instead of water tube boilers which would not be available for at least seven months.

On 27 February 1939 the British Admiralty approved William Reed's sketch design and, with war becoming ever more likely, a bulk order was placed with the aim of creating a viable anti-submarine force where none had existed before. The first order, for twenty-six vessels, was soon followed by others, and by the end of 1939 no less than 110 vessels of this kind were under construction at various shipyards around the country (including by some large ones, such as the Harland and Wolff yard at Belfast). Smith's Dock built 12 of the total of 196 built of this class.

=== French Flower-class corvettes ===
At the outbreak of World War II the Marine nationale (French Navy) needed ships for anti-submarine warfare (ASW) and, following the Royal Navy (RN)'s example, placed orders from Smith's Dock for four corvettes. Following this the Marine nationale ordered a further 18 ships, to be built at a number of British and French shipyards. These were identical to the British Flower-class corvettes except that French 100 mm (3.9 in) and 13.2 mm anti-aircraft guns were to be fitted.

The Fall of France in June 1940 brought a drastic change to these building programmes. Of the original four French Flower-class corvettes, La Bastiaise was mined on builders trials and the others were taken over by the RN on completion.

Of the second group, the 12 ships ordered from British yards were taken over by the RN and re-armed with British ordnance; all were renamed and given Flower names in keeping with the class.

First order
Ship	Builder	Completed	Fate
La Bastiase	Smith's Dock	22 June 1940	Sunk by mine, 22 June 1940
La Malouine	Smith's Dock	30 July 1940	Transferred to RN as HMS La Malouine (K46)
La Dieppoise	Smith's Dock	26 August 1940	Transferred to RN as HMS Fleur de Lys (K122)
La Paimpolaise	Smith's Dock	26 September 1940	Transferred to RN as HMS Nasturtium (K107)

Orders for six of the second group were placed with Smith's Dock.

Flower-class corvettes – Marine nationale* & Royal Navy
Name	Pennant	Laid down	Launched	Completed
HMS Snowdrop*	K67	10 April 1940	19 July 1940	16 January 1941
HMS Sunflower	K41	24 May 1940	19 August 1940	25 January 1941
HMS Tulip*	K29	30 May 1940	4 September 1940	18 November 1940
HMS Verbena*	K85	29 June 1940	17 October 1940	19 December 1940
HMS Veronica*	K37	9 July 1940	17 October 1940	18 February 1941
HMS Wallflower*	K44	23 July 1940	14 November 1940	7 March 1941
HMS Zinnia*	K98	20 August 1940	28 November 1940	30 March 1941

Flower-class corvettes – Wartime orders under the 1939 and 1940 UK War Programmes
Name	Pennant	Laid down	Launched	Completed
HMS Stonecrop	K142	4 February 1941	12 May 1941	30 July 1941
HMS Vetch	K132	15 March 1941	27 May 1941	11 August 1941
HMS Sweetbriar	K209	4 April 1941	26 June 1941	8 September 1941
HMS Thyme	K210	30 April 1941	25 July 1941	23 October 1941
Snowflake	K211	19 May 1941	22 August 1941	22 August 1941

Before the ship was commissioned there would be a brief "Contractors Trial" which was followed by "Acceptance Trials"; two days later, on completion of trials, the ship would be formally commissioned, then fully stored and take to sea. These ships could be constructed and commissioned in, on average, just six months.

== Merger ==
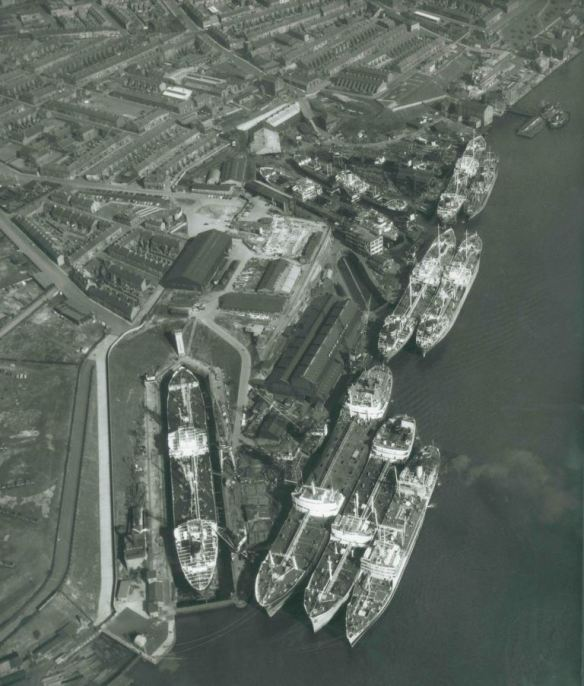
The docks in 1962, before the merger with the Shields Ferry north terminal in the top right corner

In 1966 Smith's Dock merged with Swan Hunter & Wigham Richardson to form Associated Shipbuilders, later to become Swan Hunter Group.

In 1968, the company completed the first British-built and owned container ship, Manchester Challenge of 12,039 gross register tons, for operation on Manchester Liners new container service to ports on the St Lawrence Seaway, Canada. By 1971, the company had delivered three further ships of this design to Manchester Liners.

In 1983 to 1984 Smith's Dock delivered two roll-on-roll-off ships for Brazilian owners.

The South Bank shipyard on the River Tees finally closed in February 1987.

== Legacy ==
The yard at North Shields, which had grown over the years to encompass a large site on the north bank of Tyne but was derelict by the 1990s, was then reclaimed when Places for People bought the land in 2006. New housing, as of 2023 comprising the Plateau, a crescent of townhouses, the Smokehouses, two apartments blocks, and a further row of low-rise contemporary terraced homes, has been completed so far. The plan is to eventually construct up to 850 homes, however, the COVID-19 pandemic and subsequent economic recession in the UK has delayed any immediate further development.

== See also ==
- List of shipbuilders and shipyards
