= Lowestoft War Memorial Museum =

Museum in Lowestoft, Suffolk, England

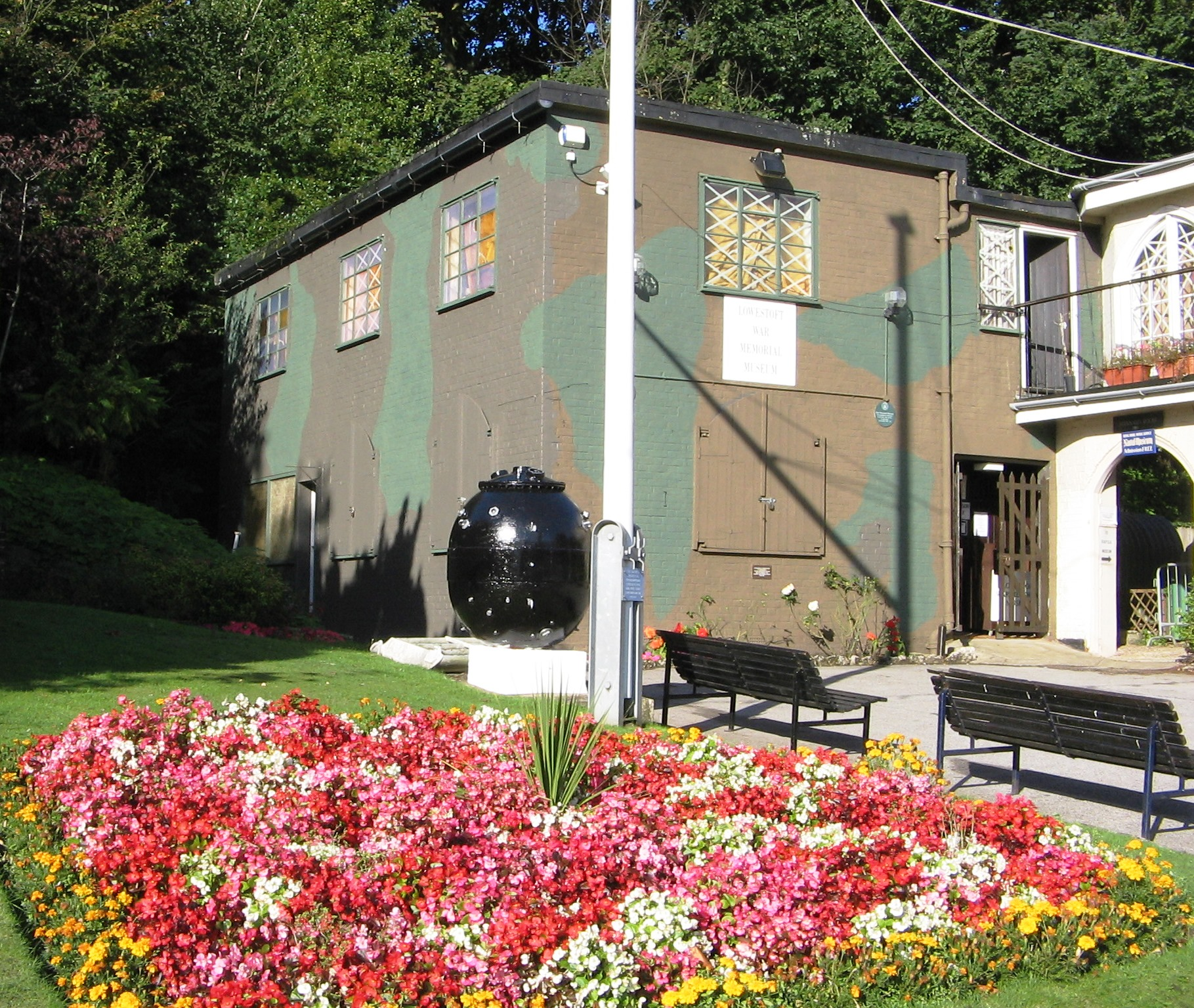
- An early photograph of the Lowestoft War Memorial Museum
- Established: 8 May 1995
- Location: Sparrows Nest Gardens, Lowestoft, Suffolk
- Coordinates: 52.4875°N 1.756°E
- Curator: Robert Jarvis
- Website: www.lowestoftwarmemorialmuseum.co.uk

The Lowestoft War Memorial Museum is a museum located in Lowestoft in the English county of Suffolk. It is housed in the World War II headquarters of the Royal Naval Patrol Service in Sparrows Nest Gardens in the north of the town. The museum is dedicated to all of the people of Lowestoft who served during World War I and World War II. It was opened in 1995, to coincide with the 50th anniversary of VE day on 8 May that year.

The museum is operated by volunteers and is open on some weekends and school holidays during the summer period. Inside the museum is a small chapel and the roll of honour for civilians killed by enemy action in Lowestoft during both World Wars. There are numerous exhibits and photographs, including many that relate to the wartime defences of the town and the effect on the town and its population of the destruction caused by enemy bombing. Other artifacts and photographs tell the stories of the servicemen and women who either served in, or who came from, Lowestoft.

== History ==
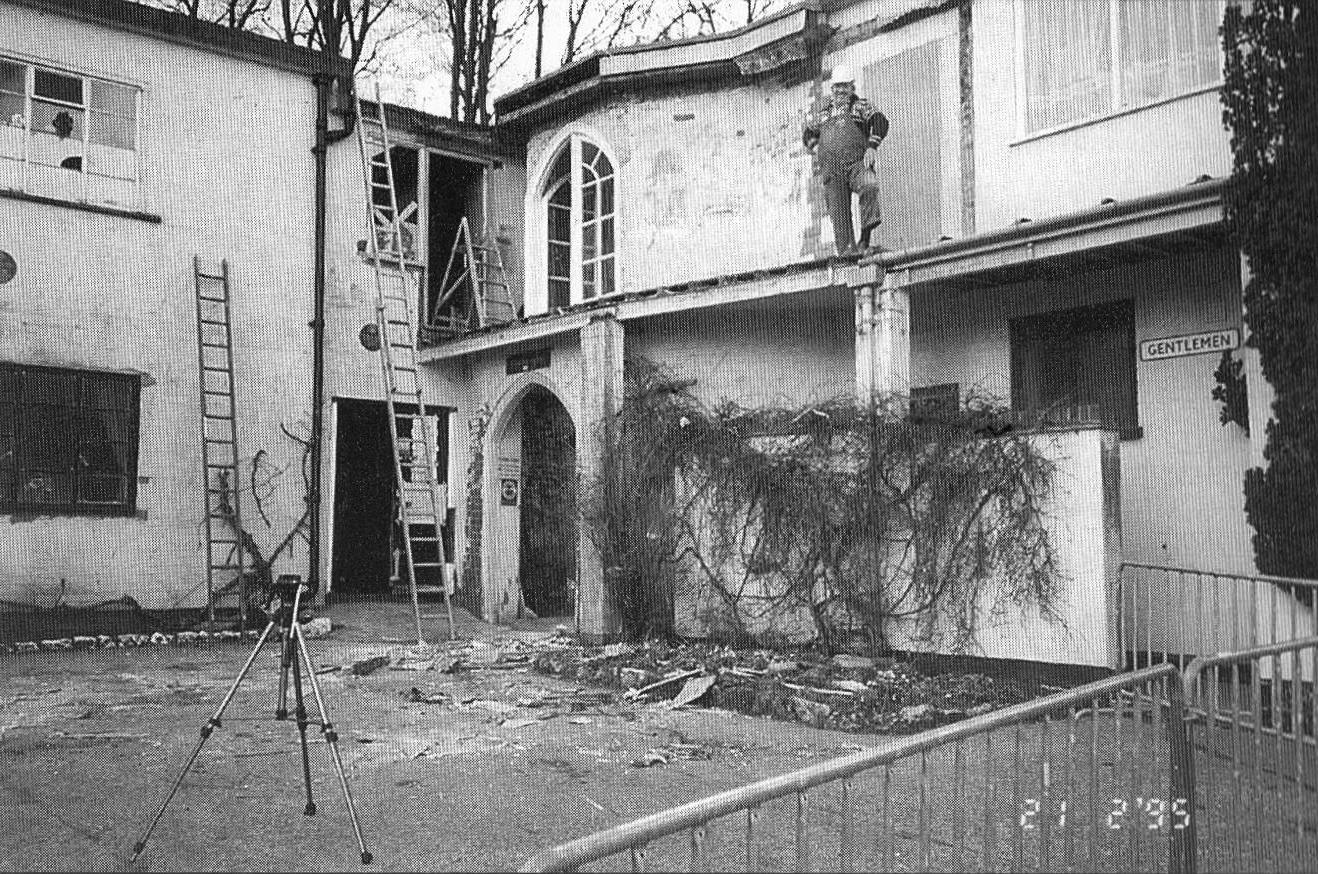
Renovation of the Sparrows Nest buildings in 1994.

Sparrows Nest originally formed the grounds and formal gardens to the early 19th century thatched summer residence of Robert Sparrow, a local wealthy landowner. The local council bought the gardens in the 1890s. The gardens became a popular venue for concerts and, in 1913, the Borough of Lowestoft commissioned the 1300-seat Pavilion Theatre in the gardens.

The museum building was built by the Royal Navy as an extension to the house following the commandeering of the site as the headquarters and central depot for the Royal Naval Patrol Service in September 1939. The base was originally named Pembroke X before being renamed HMS Europa until its decommissioning in 1946. The thatched two storey residence was demolished by the local authority in the 1960s, leaving the brick and concrete extensions which now form the Lowestoft War Memorial Museum, the Royal Naval Patrol Service Museum and a café.

Prior to its restoration in the 1990s, the building had become dilapidated, with a downstairs room, previously used by the Suffolk Wildlife Trust, in a reasonable condition, but the upstairs room needing a lot of work. Funds for the refurbishment of the building, which cost £23,000, were largely raised by Jack Rose, through the sales of his local history books and by slide shows.

== Exhibits ==
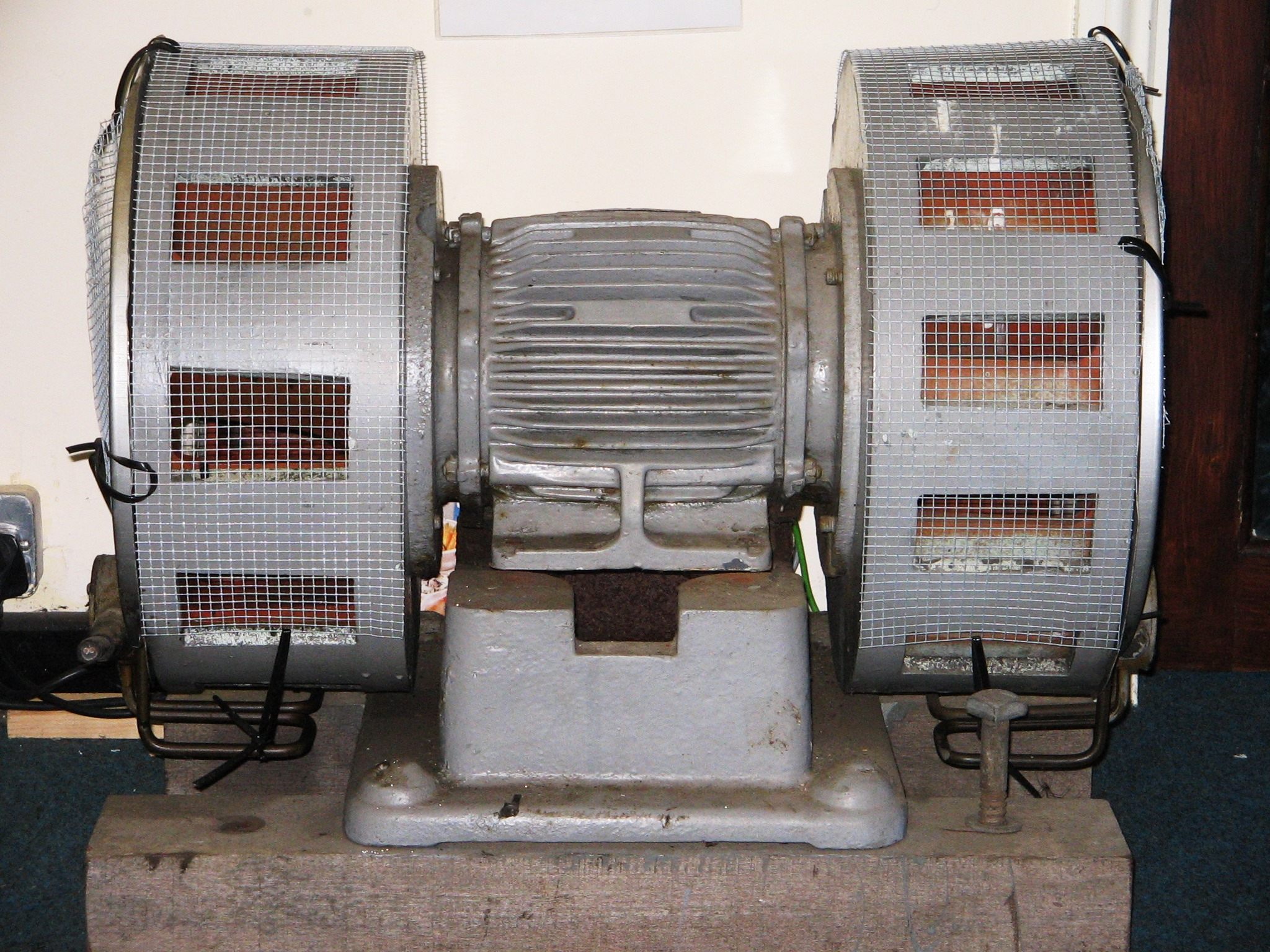
A World War II air raid siren, now housed in the museum.

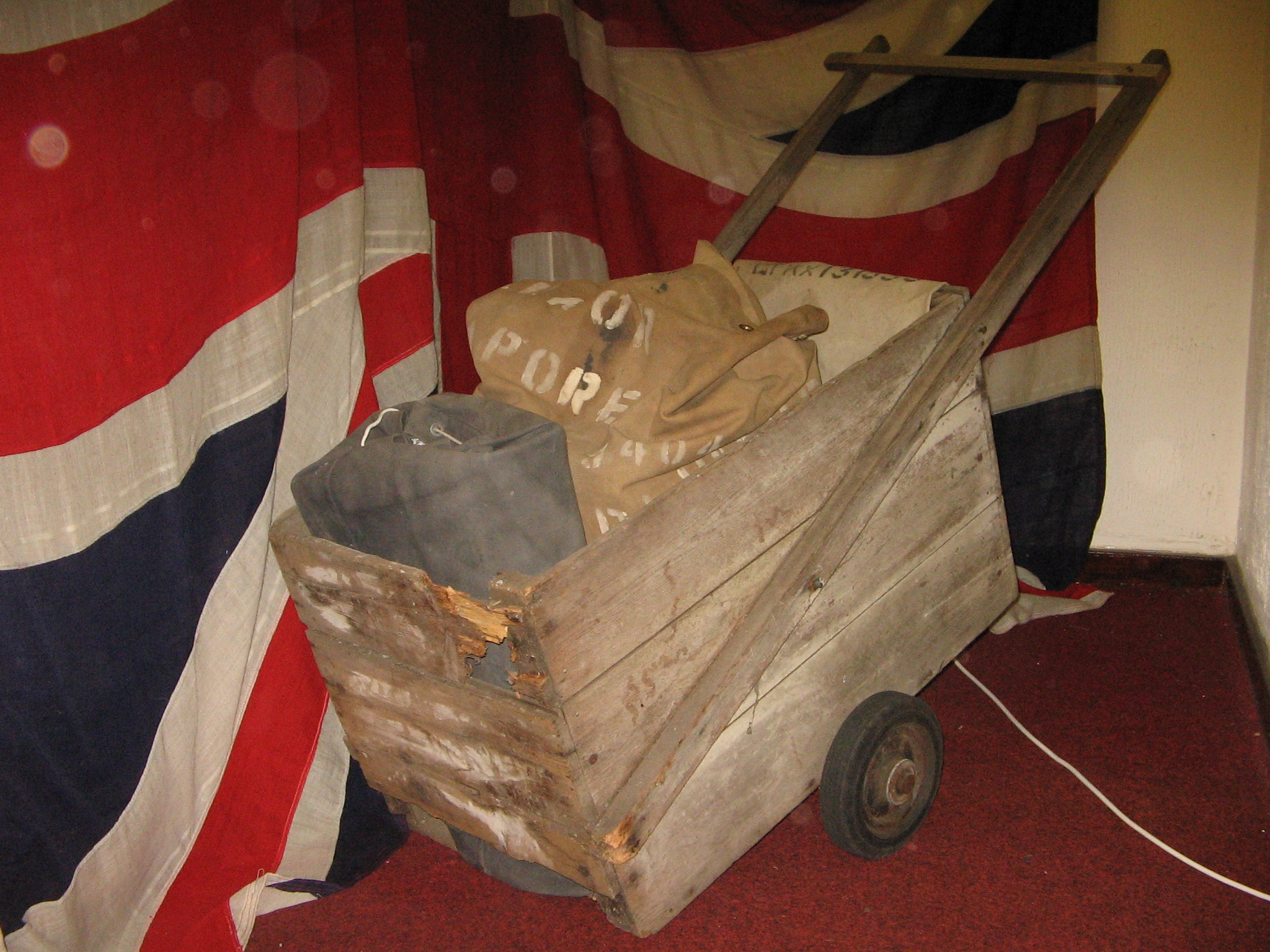
Original example of a barrow used by boys in Lowestoft to transport servicemen's belongings.

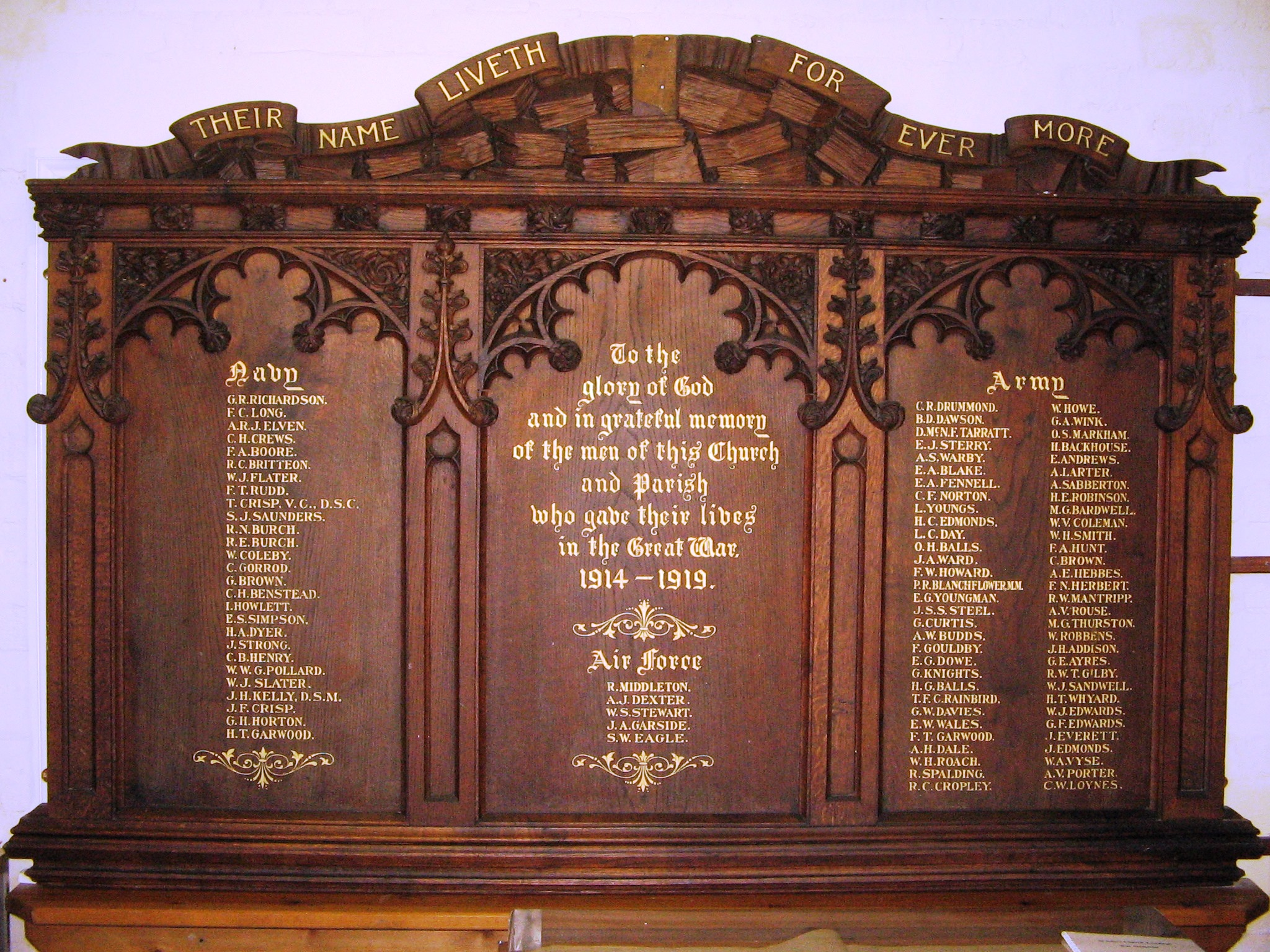
Memorial board kept in the museum's chapel.

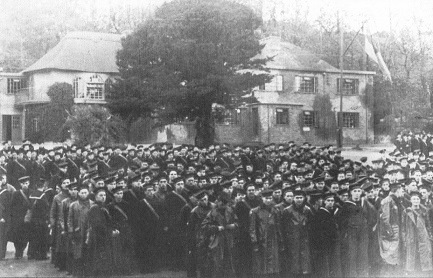
A photograph of HMS Europa. The sailors are waiting to be given their draft or ship by an officer.
