= HMS Snowdrop (K67) =

Flower-class corvette

History

United Kingdom
- Name: HMS Snowdrop
- Ordered: 31 August 1939
- Builder: Smiths Dock Co., Ltd. (South Bank-on-Tees, U.K.)
- Laid down: 4 February 1941
- Launched: 12 May 1941
- Commissioned: 30 July 1941
- Identification: Pennant number: K67
- Fate: Sold on 17 May 1947; Broken up in 1949

General characteristics
- Class & type: Flower-class corvette
- Displacement: 925 long tons (940 t)
- Length: 205 ft (62 m) o/a
- Beam: 33 ft (10 m)
- Draught: 11 ft 6 in (3.51 m)
- Installed power: 30 ft 4 in (9.25 m)
- Propulsion: 1 × 4-cycle triple-expansion reciprocating engine; 2 × Scotch fire-tube boilers; 1 × screw
- Speed: 16 kn (18 mph; 30 km/h)
- Range: 3,500 nmi (4,000 mi; 6,500 km) at 12 kn (14 mph; 22 km/h)
- Complement: 85
- Sensors & processing systems: 1 × SW1C or 2C radar; 1 × Type 123A or Type 127DV sonar
- Armament: 1 × BL 4 in (100 mm) Mk.IX gun; 4 × Vickers .50 cal machine gun (2×2); 4 × Lewis .303 cal machine gun (2×2); 2 × Mk.II depth charge throwers; 2 × Depth charge rails with 40 depth charges; originally fitted with minesweeping gear (later removed)

HMS Snowdrop was a Flower-class corvette of the Royal Navy. She served during the Second World War.

She was built at Smiths Dock Co., Ltd. South Bank on Tees and launched on 12 May 1941. She was sold on 17 May 1947 and scrapped on the Tyne in September 1949.
