= HMS Europa (shore establishment) =

Coordinates: 50.893°N 1.378°W

History

United Kingdom
- Name: HMS Europa
- Commissioned: 1939
- Decommissioned: 1946
- Fate: Decommissioned and closed down

General characteristics
- Class & type: Stone frigate

HMS Europa was a Royal Navy Shore establishment active between 1939 and 1946 during World War II as the central depot for the Royal Naval Patrol Service (RNPS). It was established after the commandeering of Sparrows Nest Gardens, a private residence in Lowestoft in Suffolk. Originally named Pembroke X, the base was the headquarters of the RNPS, responsible for protecting coastal Britain and its convoys, in particular undertaking minesweeping duties. Over 70,000 men and 6,000 vessels, many of them small civilian vessels such as armed trawlers, served in the RNPS during the war.

The base was decommissioned in 1946. It is now the site of Lowestoft War Memorial Museum.

== Bibliography ==
- Colledge, J. J.; Warlow, Ben & Bush, Steve (2020). Ships of the Royal Navy: The Complete Record of all Fighting Ships of the Royal Navy from the 15th Century to the Present (5th revised and updated ed.). Seaforth Publishing. ISBN 978-1-5267-9327-0.
- Warlow, Ben, Shore Establishments of the Royal Navy, Maritime, 2000. ISBN 978-0-907771-73-9
