= HMS Anchusa (K186) =

Flower-class corvette of the Royal Navy

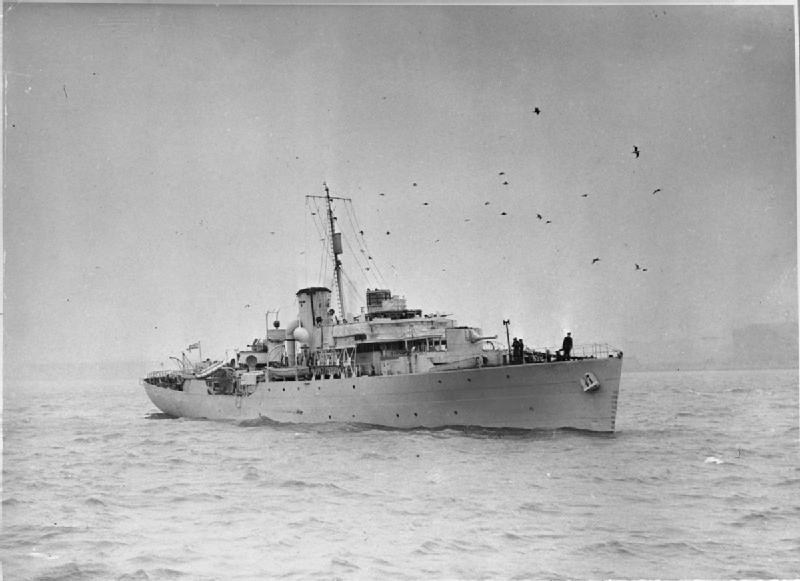
- HMS Anchusa off Liverpool

History

United Kingdom
- Name: HMS Anchusa
- Namesake: Anchusa
- Builder: Harland & Wolff
- Yard number: 1097
- Launched: 15 January 1941
- Completed: 1 March 1941
- Identification: Pennant number: K186
- Fate: Broken up in Mauritius in October 1960

General characteristics
- Class & type: Flower-class corvette
- Displacement: 1,170 tons (1,390 tons full load)
- Length: 205 ft (62 m)
- Beam: 33 ft 2 in (10.11 m)
- Draught: 15 ft 9 in (4.80 m)
- Propulsion: Two boilers driving one VTE engine generating 2750hp
- Speed: 16.5 knots (30.6 km/h)
- Complement: 85 to 109
- Armament: 1 × BL 4-inch (101.6 mm) Mk IX gun; 40 × depth charges; 72 × Hedgehog rockets

HMS Anchusa (later renamed Silverlord and Sir Edgar) was a Flower-class corvette that served in the Royal Navy.

She was launched in 1941 under the crash wartime construction program instituted by the Royal Navy shortly before the Fall of France. Built by Harland & Wolff in Belfast (one of only 34 Flower-class ships to be built in Northern Ireland), she incorporated a number of improvements to earlier Flower-class ships, that improved her performance in escorting convoys.

She had a relatively small crew of 96, with a displacement of nearly 1,000 tons, but she was mounted with the Hedgehog anti-submarine mortar, which launched contact-detonating depth charges at an enemy submarine far away from the boat itself.

Her surface armament consisted of one 102 mm gun, and six 20 mm cannon on single mounts. Her underwater armament consisted of the aforementioned Hedgehog and seventy depth charges. She was instrumental in damaging German U-boat activities in the channel area and the Atlantic, and was used as a mercantile ship after the war, being renamed Silverlord in 1949.

She was renamed once more as Sir Edgar in 1954, but was lost on 18 January 1960. She was salvaged but subsequently scrapped in Mauritius.
