= David M. Watson =

Australian ecologist

David Michael Watson
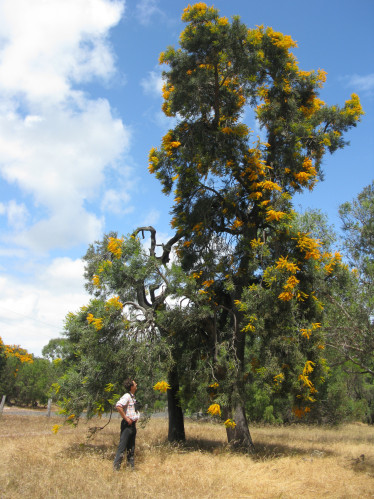
- DM Watson standing next to the hemi-parasitic plant, Nuytsia floribunda in 2007
- Born: April 1, 1973 (age 53); Melbourne, Victoria
- Education: Monash University (BS, Honours} The University of Kansas (PhD)
- Occupation: Professor of Ecology
- Employer: Charles Sturt University
- Title: Professor of Ecology
- Partner: Maggie Jonell (1998–present)
- Children: 3
- Awards: ESA/UNSW Inspiring Ecology Teaching Award
- Website: https://www.csu.edu.au/research/gulbali/find-experts/profiles/environmental-science/david-watson

David M. Watson is an Australian ornithologist and ecologist who is also a scientific specialist on mistletoes and acoustic monitoring. He served on the New South Wales Threatened Species Scientific Committee from 2015 until publicly resigning in June 2017 in protest after the NSW Berejiklian government passed a bill granting heritage status to feral horses in the Kosciuszko National Park.

== Education ==
Watson completed a BSc (Honours) in biology from Monash University in 1994 with a thesis titled "The dynamics of bird communities in remnant buloke (Allocasuarina luehmanni) woodlands". Watson completed a PhD in 1999 at the University of Kansas, with a thesis "Temporal scale and the consequences of habitat fragmentation: Case studies on Mesoamerican highland birds" based on fieldwork centered in Oaxaca, Mexico.

== Career ==
Watson is an ecologist with a research focus on habitat fragmentation and the ecological interactions between plants and birds. He has an interest in the tools of ecological monitoring such as survey methods and acoustic monitoring. He became fascinated with mistletoe during his Honours degree and subsequently wrote a global review of mistletoes as a keystone resource in forests and woodlands worldwide. After this publication, he conducted a large removal experiment of mistletoes from woodlands in Australia and showed that mistletoes acted as drivers of bird diversity, especially insectivores. He wrote Mistletoes of Southern Australia in 2011 (2nd ed., 2019)/. Currently, his research focus is on the effects of mistletoe on tree health and soils, mostly in farming and production landscapes, including macadamia crops in Queensland, the introduction of mistletoe in urban trees to increase biodiversity within the urban landscape, and conservation of sandalwood in Western Australia. Watson uses social media and public talks to try and revise the reputation of mistletoe from just a parasite to a "ecological Robin Hood" which supports and encourages biodiversity.

Watson developed the 'standardized search' using the Chao estimator equations to easily construct species accumulation curves in the field to ensure that wildlife monitoring between sites is comparable.

He was also one of five chief instigators of the Australian Acoustic Observatory. The Observatory is a continental array of 400 permanent acoustic sensors installed across 100 sites in major Australian ecosystems and continuously records high-resolution audio around the clock to create a permanent, open-access cloud archive of natural sounds. In 2026, Watson and his research team at Charles Sturt University developed the BBC (Bush Bird Classifier), an automated acoustic recognition tool designed to identify up to 183 bird species in southeastern Australian woodlands based on their calls.

Watson, in his persona of "Dr Dave" has appeared in three series of educational videos including Dr Dave in Box-Gum Grassy Woodlands, Dr Dave in the Murray Catchment and Dr Dave in the Outback

Watson is a board member of the Great Eastern Ranges and a founding member of the Slopes-to-Summit regional partnership.

Watson is currently a Professor of Ecology at Charles Sturt University in Albury, NSW, Australia and the program lead for Cultural Connection and Environmental Stewardship in the Gulbali Institute.

== Awards ==
Watson was the inaugural winner of the ESA/UNSW Inspiring Ecology Teaching award in 2025 for his establishment and teaching of the annual desert trip to Sturt National Park in far western New South Wales.

== Personal life ==
Watson is married with three children.
