= David McCloy Watson =

Irish accountant (20th century)

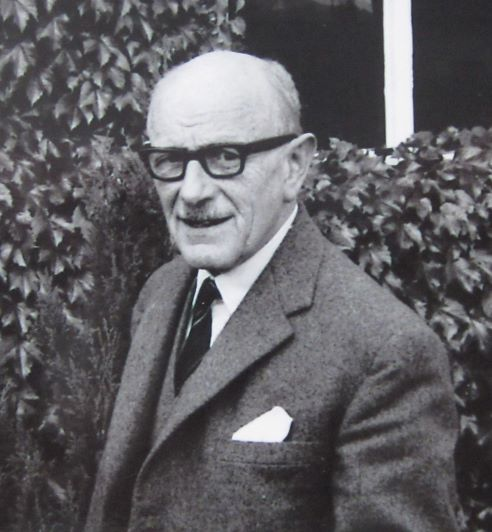
David McCloy Watson photographed in 1965. Source: reproduced from private collection with permission.

David McCloy Watson (1902-1980) was a prominent Dublin accountant of the mid-twentieth century. He spent his entire career in the accountancy firm Craig Gardner, being articled in 1925, qualified in 1928, a partner from 1944 and retired as senior partner in 1969. He was President of the Institute of Chartered Accountants in Ireland in 1959/60.

== Education and career ==
Watson was educated at St. Andrews College, Dublin and Trinity College Dublin. He graduated in 1924 with the degrees of BA and LLB. His academic career was distinguished, becoming a Trinity scholar in Mathematics. He was articled to the accountancy firm of Craig Gardner in 1925 and qualified in 1928. He became a partner in 1944 and was senior partner when he retired in 1969.

Watson's career and the growth of his firm were influenced by the gradual development of the economy after Ireland's independence. For example, the Irish Hospitals' Sweepstakes - an early initiative of the independent Irish state to increase investment in its hospitals - were major clients of Craig Gardner's and Watson was closely involved in this work.

However, it was only from the late 1950s that the Irish economy really started to expand as it opened up to foreign trade and investment. It was during these years that Watson made his most public contribution to the development of the accountancy profession in Ireland and to reform of the economy. The Institute of Chartered Accountants in Ireland made a number of submissions to the Irish government on the modernisation of Irish tax and company law to which Watson contributed. In 1954 Watson was amongst five Institute members who gave evidence to an official committee investigating industrial taxation. They recommended changes to company taxation to encourage greater investment and increase industrial production. Many of their recommendations were incorporated in the Finance (Miscellaneous Provisions) Act of 1956. In 1957 the Irish government moved on to review Ireland's taxation system in general. Watson was one of four authors of the Institute's submission on the matter. They recommended a change in emphasis from direct to indirect taxation including the introduction of a general sales tax. Almost all of their recommendations were accepted although their dislike of a system of Pay As You Earn for collecting income tax did not prevent its introduction. Watson was also influential in the drafting of the Companies Bill 1962 leading to the Companies Act 1963. During his presidential address to the 72nd. annual general meeting of the Institute of Chartered Accountants in Ireland in 1960, Watson had warned of the urgent need to reform Irish company law and regretted the delay in the implementation of the recommendations of the Company Law Commission of 1958 (which Watson had helped shape).

Watson also influenced the development of professional education and training of accountants in Ireland. He was a member of a subcommittee of the Council of the Institute of Chartered Accountants in Ireland which recommended changes to the training of accountants in 1956, all of which were accepted. These included the replacement of the intermediate and final examinations by five annual examinations, a limitation on the number of times a candidate might sit for any examination and full time University level study of law and economics in the third year of the five year apprenticeship.

Watson was also a prominent figure through his board and other memberships. He was a deputy chairman of the Ulster Bank and chairman of the New Hibernia Investment Trust.

Writing of him not long after his death, a former colleague described him as having had 'a most outstanding career in his profession' and that 'he brought to everything he did acumen, appreciation and, above all, integrity.'

== Family ==
Watson was born in Blackrock, Co. Dublin on 19 September 1902 to William Watson and Elizabeth Watson (nee Johnston). His father was the manager of Paul & Vincent, a manufacturer of fertiliser and animal foodstuffs. His grandfather, also William, had come to Dublin from Scotland in about 1856 where he latterly established a large and successful garden nursery business. He married Elsie Dalton, daughter of William R. Dalton, at St. Andrew's Presbyterian Church, Blackrock, Co. Dublin on 23 April 1932. They had two daughters, Ann and Ruth - Ruth married Beresford Wynne (a descendant of the Wynnes of Hazelwood House, Co. Sligo) in 1960.

David McCloy Watson died in January 1980. He was buried in the graveyard of Kilternan Parish Church, Kilternan, Co. Dublin.

== Works cited ==
- Farmer, Tony (1988). A history of Craig Gardner & Co.: the first 100 years. Dublin: Gill and MacMillan.
- Lee, J. J. (1989). Ireland 1912-1985: politics and society. Cambridge: Cambridge University Press. ISBN 0521377412.
- Robinson, H. W. (1964). A history of accountants in Ireland. Dublin: Institute of Chartered Accountants in Ireland.
