= French corvette Mimosa =

Flower-class corvette

Mimosa
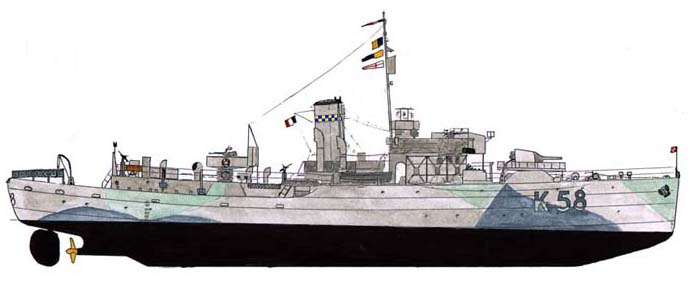
- Flower-class corvette in 1942 paint

History

Free France
- Name: Mimosa
- Ordered: 31 August 1939
- Laid down: 22 April 1940
- Launched: 19 January 1941
- Commissioned: 11 May 1941
- Identification: Pennant number: K11
- Fate: Torpedoed and sunk on 9 June 1942

General characteristics
- Class & type: Flower-class corvette
- Displacement: 950 tonnes
- Length: 62.7 m (205 ft 9 in)
- Beam: 10.9 m (35 ft 9 in)
- Draught: 2.7 m (8 ft 10 in)
- Propulsion: Engine: 4-cylinder triple-expansion steam engine; Fuel: Gazole; Pressure: 225 PSI; Power:2,750 hp (2,050 kW)
- Speed: 16 knots (30 km/h; 18 mph)
- Range: 3,450 nmi (6,390 km; 3,970 mi) at 12 knots (22 km/h; 14 mph); Fuel capacity: 230 tonnes
- Complement: 70
- Sensors & processing systems: Type 271 surface radar
- Armament: 1 BL 4 in (102 mm) Mark IX gun; 1 Mark VIII 40 mm gun; 2 Mark IIA 20 mm guns; 2 Hotchkiss machine guns; 1 Mark III "Hedgehog" mortar (24 shells); 4 Mark I depth charge launchers; 2 ramps for Mark I depth charges; 60 depth charges

Mimosa (formerly HMS Mimosa) was one of the nine Flower-class corvettes lent by the Royal Navy to the Free French Naval Forces.

== Construction ==
Mimosa was built by Charles Hill & Sons, and Richardsons Westgarth & Company.

== War service ==
Originally built as HMS Mimosa by the Royal Navy, she was loaned to the Free French Navy upon completion on 19 January 1941.

On 15 October 1941 the ship picked up 26 survivors from the British merchant vessel Silvercedar, later that day Mimosa rescued another 26 survivors from the Norwegian merchant vessel Ila. Both ships had been torpedoed and sunk by the German submarine U-553.

== Sinking ==
On 9 June 1942 Mimosa was sunk via torpedo by U-124 while escorting convoy ONS 100 through the Atlantic Ocean. The ship sank three minutes after being hit when the boilers exploded. 66 sailors including the commanding officer died in the attack. The rest of the convoy did not notice the sinking until the morning when Canadian destroyer HMCS Assiniboine found four survivors on a raft.
