= David Mulholland =

English painter

David Mulholland (1946–2005) was a painter from the north-east of England whose work primarily depicted the people and environment around his home in South Bank, North Yorkshire. He was the second son of Jean (née Wells) and James. His father worked as a labourer in the local steelworks.

== Education ==
He attended Cromwell Road Junior School and Victoria Street Secondary Modern. Upon leaving school, at the age of fifteen, he spent two years at Middlesbrough Art College. He moved to London when awarded a scholarship to Byam Shaw School of Art and progressed from there to the Royal College of Art from where he graduated, in 1971, with an MA in Fine Art and Anthropology.

== Career ==
The three years after graduation from RCA were spent sailing the seas with the College of the Sea – providing art tutelage to merchant seamen and continuing with his own painting. By the time he completed that, he had family responsibilities so returned to Teesside, did a post-graduate course in education and got a job as an art teacher at Gillbrook School (now Gillbrook Academy). He remained in teaching until 1992.

Although he spent seven years attending art colleges in London he continued to spend considerable time back home in South Bank, and the environment around there featured in most of the paintings and drawings that he exhibited in a retrospective show at Middlesbrough Art Gallery in 1972. Although this exhibition brought some acclaim, there would be only one other exhibition of his work during his lifetime – at the Chapel Beck Gallery in Guisborough in 1978. After that he became disillusioned with the art world and declined offers of further exhibitions. He still continued to paint but distributed his work among people that he knew, or exchanged it for goods and services.

Due to his idiosyncratic approach to his work, he was not widely known when he died at the age of fifty-six from cancer of the throat. His fame has increased since his death, however, through two major exhibitions of his work. The first of these, at the Dorman Museum in Middlesbrough (October 2012 – June 2013), prompted the editor of The Jackdaw to ask himself why he had not previously heard of David Mulholland and declared that his “work hit me immediately as authentic, born of intimate feeling for its subject". The second exhibition, at the Kirkleatham Museum (January – June 2014), received a five-star review in the Morning Star newspaper. Prior to these exhibitions, three paintings that expressed Mulholland's reaction to the attack on the twin towers of the World Trade Center on 11 September 2001 were exhibited at the Dorman Museum to mark the tenth anniversary of the event.

== External sources ==
- The Art of David Mulholland website.
- Video of an exhibition opening.
- Video about an exhibition.
