= Royal Naval Patrol Service =

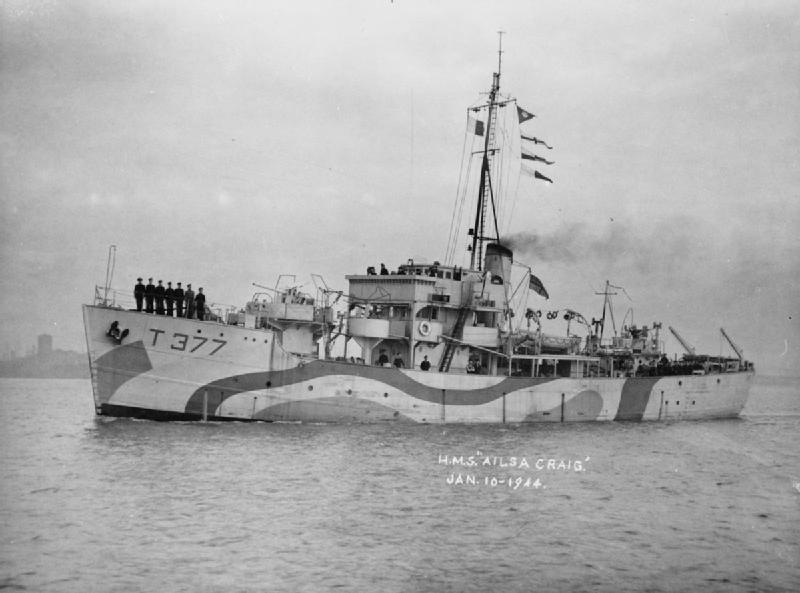
- The HMT Ailsa Craig, a minesweeping Isles-class trawler of the RNPS, 1944
- Active: 1914–1919, 1939-1946
- Country: United Kingdom
- Branch: Royal Navy

The Royal Naval Patrol Service (RNPS) was a branch of the Royal Navy active during both the First and Second World Wars. The RNPS operated many small auxiliary vessels such as naval trawlers for anti-submarine and minesweeping operations to protect coastal Britain and convoys.

== History ==
The Royal Naval Patrol Service has its origins in the Great War when the threat of mine warfare was first realized by the British Admiralty. The pre-war Commander-in-Chief of the Home Fleet, Admiral Lord Charles Beresford, is credited with recommending the use of Grimsby trawlers for minesweeping operations following visits he made to various East Coast Ports in 1907. Grimsby, with its impressive docklands and trawler fleet was seen as ideal, with the Commander-in-Chief arguing that the fishing fleet would be inactive in times of war as fishing grounds became war zones. It was also thought that trawlermen would be more skilled than naval ratings with regards to the handling of the sizeable warps and winches that would be required for mine sweeping as they were already accustomed to using them with the working of the trawl. The Admiralty Minesweeping Division remained active throughout the remainder of World War I until the end of the war when the trawlers were returned to their owners to resume fishing operations and the division was disbanded.

The need for a skilled minesweeping force was recognised to be a part of modern naval warfare and the Royal Navy later commissioned one flotilla of fleet minesweepers for the instruction of ratings and junior officers. Three trawlers were then added to the group along with the re-introduction of training in the Trawler Section of the Royal Naval Reserve and, under the new name of the Royal Naval Patrol Service courses in training began at Portland. As tensions mounted in the years before the Second World War training intensified for officers and ratings and experiments and developments in sweeping methods and equipment were carried out, including improvements made to the Oropesa Sweep, named after the trawler that first tried the method in 1918.

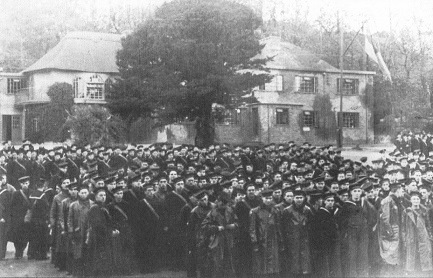
Sparrow's Nest as HMS Europa, in Lowestoft. The sailors are waiting to be given their draft or ship by an officer.

In the summer of 1939 the Admiralty purchased 67 trawlers with a further 20 newly constructed and at the outbreak of World War II every available minesweeper of the Royal Navy and Royal Naval Patrol Service was at her war station. HMS Europa, usually known as Sparrow's Nest, became the Central Depot of the Royal Naval Patrol Service, located at Lowestoft, the most easterly point of Great Britain, and then the closest British military establishment to the enemy until decommissioned in 1946. The Lowestoft War Memorial Museum in the town is housed in the old Royal Naval Patrol Service headquarters building.

This eventually became the training and drafting base for more than 70,000 men, who manned 6,000 small craft of numerous types, including trawlers, whalers, drifters, MFVs (Motor Fishing Vessels), MLs (Motor Launches), and later MMS (Motor Minesweepers or "Mickey Mouses"), American produced BYMS (British Yard Mine Sweepers) and numerous requisitioned vessels.

Grimsby once again proved its worth in service to minesweeping, becoming the largest minesweeper base in Britain, and making possible the clearing of 34,858 mines from vital sea lanes.

Between 1942 and its decommissioning in 1946 new construction ships and craft manned by the Service totalled 1,637 of various kinds including converted trawlers, corvettes, fuel carriers, motor launches and naval seaplane tenders. Of this total, from September 1939 through to May 1945, approximately 260 trawlers were lost in action... This material loss however pales into insignificance when compared to the 15,000 or so, RNPS personnel who were killed in the Second World War, including the 2385 RNPS seaman who "have no known grave but the sea".

== Harry Tate's Navy ==
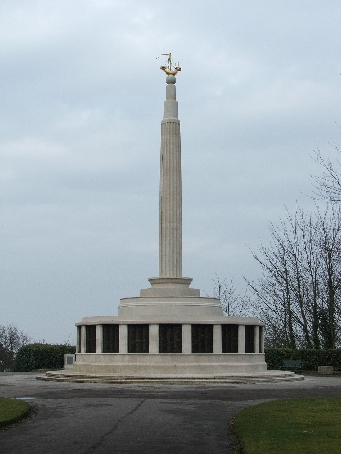
Royal Naval Patrol Service Memorial

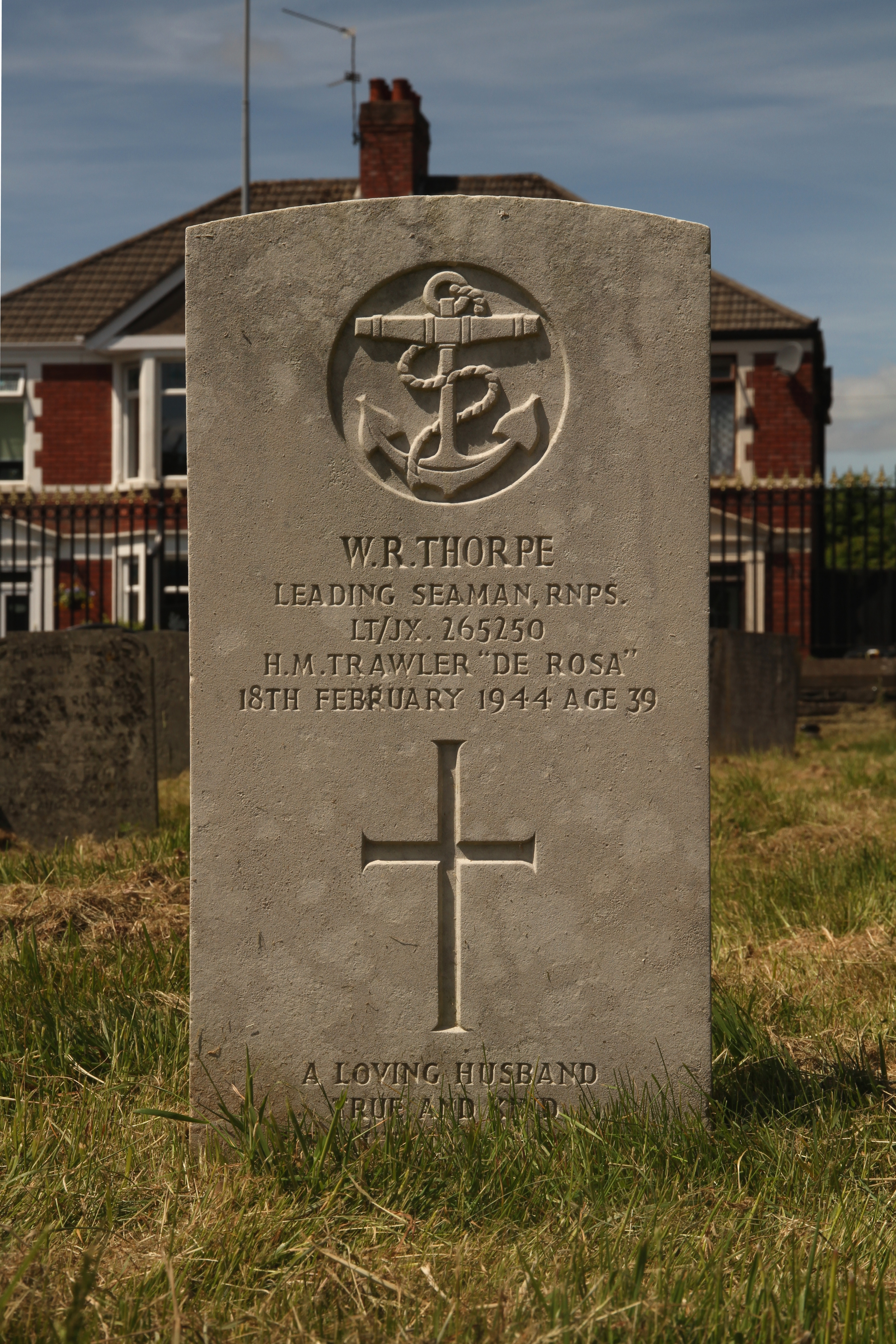
Grave in Cathays Cemetery, Cardiff of an RNPS Leading Seaman from HMT De Rosa

The advantages of using small ships for minesweeping and other duties had been recognised in the First World War and many of the crews of the peacetime fishing fleets had been encouraged to join the Royal Naval Reserve. Because the majority were reservists the RNPS became a "Navy within a Navy".

Because it used out-dated and poorly armed vessels, such as requisitioned trawlers crewed by ex-fishermen, the RNPS came to bear a number of unofficial titles that poked fun at it, such as "Harry Tate's Navy", "Churchill's pirates" and "Sparrows".

The name 'Harry Tates' dates back to the First World War and was used as jargon for anything clumsy and amateurish. It originated from an old music hall entertainer who would play the clumsy comic who couldn't get to grips with various contraptions. His act included a car that gradually fell apart around him. By the start of World War II it had been adopted by the Royal Navy and used for the purpose of poking fun at the trawlers and drifters of the Royal Naval Patrol Service. In true RNPS style they took it on the chin and the title of Harry Tate's Navy was proudly adopted. As the war went on it was to become a worthy password for courage.

Because the peacetime crews became naval seamen together they developed a special camaraderie. This camaraderie continued in the service throughout World War II, even though by the end most RNPS members were "hostilities only" who had had little connection with the sea before the war.

The Royal Naval Patrol Service suffered over 250 lost vessels, more than any other branch of the Royal Navy Because of the dangers and losses faced by the men of the Royal Naval Patrol service, they were honoured in a statement made by Churchill and by a unique silver badge, worn on the sleeve of the serviceman's uniform, that was awarded to those who served six months or more in the RNPS.

MESSAGE FROM THE PRIME MINISTER TO THE OFFICERS AND MEN OF THE MINESWEEPING FLOTILLAS

Now that Nazi Germany has been defeated I wish to send you all on behalf of His Majesty's Government a message of thanks and gratitude.

The work you do is hard and dangerous. You rarely get and never seek publicity; your only concern is to do your job, and you have done it nobly. You have sailed in many seas and all weathers... This work could not be done without loss, and we mourn all who have died and over 250 ships lost on duty.

No work has been more vital than yours; no work has been better done. The Ports were kept open and Britain breathed. The Nation is once again proud of you.

W S Churchill

== Operations ==
The RNPS fought in all theatres of the war, from the Arctic to the Mediterranean, from the Atlantic to the Far East, involved in convoy duty, minesweeping and anti-submarine work. Most particularly they kept the British coast clear of the mines that were wreaking havoc with merchant ships.

One RNPS member, Lieutenant Richard Stannard won the Victoria Cross while in command of the Hull trawler Arab in the Namsos campaign.

== Boats of the RNPS ==
The fighting fleet of the RNPS consisted of a range of vessels. In the days prior to World War II the Grimsby class sloop was used in mine sweeping and anti-submarine operations. This class is named after the port that was first recommended for use in minesweeping with its trawler fleet in 1907 by Commander-in-Chief of the Home Fleet Admiral Lord Beresford. In 1933 four of the new Halcyon-class minesweepers were laid down, regarded as 'fast sweepers'. They were 20 ft shorter than the Grimsby Class as the need for small vessels of shallow draught was recognised as crucial for working in minefields. By 1939, with the threat of war imminent, the more economically and rapidly built 'whale catcher' Flower-class corvettes were built.

With war now a certainty, the Admiralty expanded minesweeping fleets by purchasing 67 trawlers and ordering a further 20 trawlers to be purpose built, recognising their ideal suitability for sweeping. Hundreds more vessels would be requisitioned by the Admiralty as the war continued and more purpose built vessels were developed, including specially designed timber-hulled Motor MineSweepers (MMS class) that would be better protected from the threat of magnetic mines.

== See also ==
- Auxiliary Patrol
- Royal Naval Reserve
- History of the Royal Naval Reserve
- Trawlers of the Royal Navy
- Coastal Forces of the Royal Navy
