= German patrol boat PA 1 =

Captured French vessel

History

Nazi Germany
- Name: PA 1
- Builder: Chantiers de la Loire
- Launched: 22 November 1940
- Commissioned: 15 April 1944
- Fate: Bombed and sunk by Royal Air Force aircraft at Le Havre on 15 June 1944.

General characteristics
- Class & type: Flower-class corvette
- Armament: 1 × single 10.5 cm gun; Twin 3.7 cm AA gun; 2 cm Flak 30 AA gun; 2 × Quad 2 cm AA guns; Depth charges

The German patrol boat PA 1 (intended French name Arquebuse) was a captured French vessel in service with the Kriegsmarine in the 15 Vorpostenflotille as a Channel convoy escort throughout the latter half of World War II.

== History ==
PA 1 was a French built Flower-class corvette of British specifications in the shipyard of Chantiers de la Loire in St. Nazaire-Penhoet. She was originally intended to be named Arquebuse in a series of four Flower-class corvettes: Hallebarde, Sabre, and Poignard. However, the shipyard fell into German hands after the fall of France in 1940 before the four ships could be finished, causing the unfinished corvette to be requisitioned into the Kriegsmarine and finished to unique specifications by her new German owners. She was designated the Patroullienboot Ausland 1, shortened to PA 1, and was outfitted to serve a role as a Channel convoy escort that the other, lighter armed, vessels of the 15 Vorpotenflotille could not. The other Vorpostenboote of the flotilla lacked naval guns larger than 3.7 centimeters, making them inefficient in protecting merchant vessels from British motor gun boat and motor torpedo boat attacks at night.

PA 1 was the third vessel in the series to be commissioned, after PA 2 and PA 3, with PA 4 never being completed. PA 1 was commissioned to active duty on 15 April 1944 but never saw direct action. She was severely damaged in a heavy bombing raid of Le Havre and was decommissioned on 24 August 1944, likely because it was not deemed worth the cost to repair the ship.

== Bibliography ==
- Gröner, Erich (1993). Die deutschen Kriegsschiffe 1815–1945: Ujäger, Vorpostenboote, Hilfsminensucher, Küstenschutzverbände (in German). Vol. VIII/1. Koblenz: Bernard & Graefe. ISBN 3-7637-4807-5.
- Naims, Günther (2003). Seekrieg im Ärmelkanal: Vorpostenboote an vorderster Front (in German). Hamburg: Mittler. ISBN 3-8132-0810-9. OCLC 53376422.
