= German patrol boat PA 2 =

Captured French Ship in the German Navy during WW2

History

Nazi Germany
- Name: PA 2
- Builder: Chantiers de la Loire
- Launched: 22 November 1940
- Fate: Bombed and sunk by Royal Air Force aircraft, 15 June 1944

General characteristics
- Class & type: Flower-class corvette
- Armament: 1 × single 10.5 cm gun; Twin 3.7 cm AA gun; 2 cm Flak 30 AA gun; 2 × quadruple 2 cm AA guns; Depth charges

The German patrol boat PA 2 (intended French name Hallebarde) was a captured French vessel in the service of the Kriegsmarine in the 15 Vorpostenflotille as a Channel convoy escort throughout the latter half of World War II.

== Description ==
PA 2 was a Flower-class corvette constructed by the French to British specifications. However, since none of the ships were completed by the time that the Germans captured them, they were completed with different modifications using available armaments that fitted the Germans' needs. The ship's main armament was a 10.5 cm C/32 naval gun mounted at the fore of the ship on the deck. The ship also boasted an impressive anti-aircraft arsenal, including two single 2 cm Flak 30 guns on each side of the ship, two quad 2 cm Flak guns on top of the bridge, and a twin 3.7 Flak gun by the engine room. In addition, the ship carried two depth charge throwers on each side as well as minesweeping gear, consisting of measures against acoustic and magnetic mines.

== Background ==
With the fall of France in early 1940, the German Kriegsmarine took control of a number of French shipyards in the process of constructing both civilian and military ships. Among these was Chantiers de la Loire shipyard in St. Nazaire-Penhoet, which was in the process of constructing four Flower-class corvettes to be called Arquebuse, Hallebarde, Sabre, and Poignard, with each in various stages of construction when the Germans took the shipyard. Hallebarde was the closest to completion of the four and was re-designated as PA 2 by the Kriegsmarine. PA stood for Patroullienboot Ausland, which translates to foreign patrol boat, a designation used only for the four captured corvettes. PA 2 was placed in the unit of 15 Vorpostenflotille, a flotilla of German trawlers and whalers that had been converted into Vorpostenboote, escort and flak ships for German shipping in the Atlantic.

The captured corvettes were constructed to fill a deficiency in the escort fleets in the English Channel, which was that the ships protecting merchant shipping were generally only armed with 3.7 cm guns. This armament was incapable of launching flares to coordinate counter-fire against British motor torpedo boat and motor gun boat attacks that took place at night. The corvettes thus filled the dual role of an anti-aircraft vessel and a fire control ship for the escort of merchant ships.

== Service ==
PA 2 was the first in the series to be commissioned into active duty in September 1943. Its first recorded action was on the night of 26 September, while she was escorting the freighter Maladi alongside the minesweepers M82 and M84, Von Der Groeben and Jungingen, and the Vorpostenboot V 1507 Rau I. The convoy came under attack by Dutch motor torpedo boats and British motor gun boats. The convoy was unable to defend Maladi, which was sunk by torpedoes, and Jungingen was damaged by gunfire.

On 26 February 1944, PA 2 participated in a joint mission with PA 3 and several Vorpostenboote: V 1506 Wal 9, V 1507 Rau I and V 1509 Rau III. The convoy was escorting the tanker Reckum from Cherbourg to Le Havre. That night, the convoy came under attack from British gun and torpedo boats aiming to sink the tanker. PA 2 and PA 3 were able to direct the convoy's fire by firing hundreds of flare shells, allowing the convoy to successfully screen the tanker through the run and also sink a torpedo boat .

PA 3 was ultimately sunk in a massive Allied bombing raid of the port of Le Havre by heavy Lancaster bombers on the night of 14 June, along with six other ships of the flotilla docked there.

== Bibliography ==
- Gröner, Erich (1993). Die deutschen Kriegsschiffe 1815–1945: Flußfahrzeuge, Ujäger, Vorpostenboote, Hilfsminensucher, Küstenschutzverbände (in German). Vol. VIII/1. Koblenz: Bernard & Graefe. ISBN 3-7637-4807-5.
- Naims, Günther (2003). Seekrieg im Ärmelkanal: Vorpostenboote an vorderster Front (in German). Hamburg: Mittler. ISBN 3-8132-0810-9. OCLC 53376422.
