= HMT Amethyst =

Coordinates: 51°30′28″N 1°01′15″E

- HMT Amethyst in her earlier guise as the Phyllis Rosalie

History

United Kingdom
- Name: HMT Amethyst
- Builder: Smith's Dock Co., South Bank-on-Tees
- Yard number: 963
- Launched: 15 January 1934
- Completed: February 1934
- Acquired: November 1935
- Renamed: Launched as the Phyllis Rosalie; Renamed Amethyst 21 November 1935
- Fate: Sunk by mine on 24 November 1940

General characteristics
- Displacement: 443 tons
- Length: 157 feet 3 inches
- Beam: 26 feet 4 inches
- Sensors & processing systems: ASDIC
- Armament: 1 × 4 in gun
- Notes: Pennant number T12

HMT Amethyst was a naval trawler requisitioned by the Admiralty prior to the Second World War. She was sunk in the second year of the war.

Amethyst was built as the commercial trawler Phyllis Rosalie by Smiths Dock Company, South Bank-on-Tees and was launched on 15 January 1934. Her first owners were the Boston Deep Sea Fishing & Ice Co Ltd, based at Fleetwood. In 1935 she set a number of records for catches landed at Fleetwood, and was present at King George V's Silver Jubilee Spithead Review, representing the port of Fleetwood. Her Skipper, Walter Holmes (DSC) was presented to King George V. She was sold later that year to the Admiralty, who had her converted into an anti-submarine warfare trawler with the addition of ASDIC and a four-inch gun. They classed her and a number of other trawlers as the Gem group, and the name Amethyst was selected.

She continued to serve during the Second World War, but on 24 November 1940, whilst under the command of T/Lt. the W.K. Rous, RNVR, she struck a mine in Barrow Deep in the Thames Estuary and sank. There were no casualties, and the survivors were landed at Southend, where they were briefly arrested under suspicion of being survivors from a sunken German craft.
