= Richard Been Stannard =

Recipient of the Victoria Cross (1902–1977)

Captain Richard Been Stannard VC DSO RD
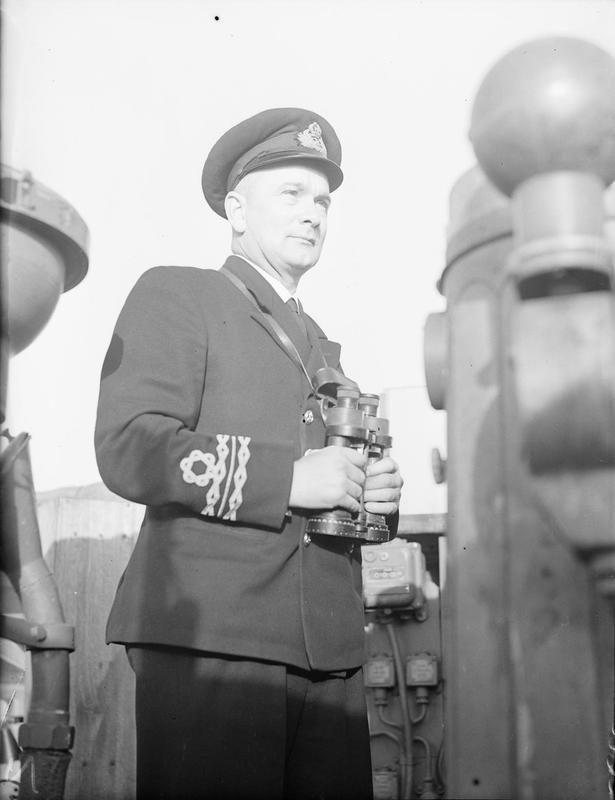
- Stannard on the bridge of Vimy in 1943
- Born: 21 August 1902; Blyth, Northumberland, England
- Died: 22 July 1977 (aged 74); Sydney, New South Wales, Australia
- Military career
- Allegiance: United Kingdom
- Branch: Royal Navy
- Service years: 1929–1954
- Rank: Captain
- Commands: HMT Arab; HMS Stanley; HMS Ramsey; HMS Vimy; HMS Peacock
- Conflicts: Second World War
- Awards: Victoria Cross; Distinguished Service Order; Reserve Decoration; Mentioned in Despatches (2); War Cross with Sword (Norway)

Captain Richard Been Stannard, VC, DSO, RD (21 August 1902 – 22 July 1977) was a British sailor, officer in the Royal Naval Reserve (RNR), and a recipient of the Victoria Cross (VC), the highest award for gallantry in the face of the enemy that can be awarded to British and Commonwealth forces. Stannard was awarded the first VC to the RNR in the Second World War.

== Early life ==
In February 1912, when Stannard was ten, his father was lost at sea along with the steamer Mount Oswald, of which he was captain. For the next five years Stannard studied at the Royal Naval Merchant School in Wokingham, Berkshire. He then entered the Merchant Service aged 15.

== Victoria Cross ==
Stannard was 37 years old, and a lieutenant in the Royal Naval Reserve during the Second World War when the following deed took place for which he was awarded the Victoria Cross (VC).

From 28 April to 2 May 1940 at Namsos, Norway, HMT Arab survived 31 bombing attacks in five days. On one occasion during this period Lieutenant Stannard and two of his crew tackled for two hours a fire on the jetty caused by a bomb igniting ammunition. Part of the jetty was saved, which proved invaluable at the subsequent evacuation. Later feats included the destruction of an enemy bomber whose pilot, thinking that he had HMT Arab at his mercy, ordered that she be steered into captivity.

Admiralty, Whitehall, 16th August, 1940.

The KING has been graciously pleased to approve the grant of the Victoria Cross to Lieutenant Richard Been Stannard, R.N.R., H.M.S. Arab, for outstanding valour and signal devotion to duty at Namsos. When enemy bombing attacks had set on fire many tons of hand grenades on Namsos wharf, with no shore water supply available, Lieutenant Stannard ran Arab's bows against the wharf and held her there. Sending all but two of his crew aft, he then endeavoured for two hours to extinguish the fire with hoses from the forecastle. He persisted in this work till he had to give up the attempt as hopeless.

After helping other ships against air attacks, he placed his own damaged vessel under shelter of a cliff, landed his crew and those of two other trawlers, and established an armed camp. Here those off duty could rest while he attacked enemy aircraft which approached by day, and kept anti-submarine watch during the night.

When another trawler near-by was hit and set on fire by a bomb, he, with two others, boarded Arab and moved her 100 yards before the other vessel blew up. Finally, when leaving the fjord, he was attacked by a German bomber which ordered him to steer East or be sunk. He held on his course, reserved his fire till the enemy was within 800 yards, and then brought the aircraft down.

Throughout a period of five days Arab was subjected to 31 bombing attacks and the camp and Lewis gun positions ashore were repeatedly machine-gunned and bombed; yet the defensive position was so well planned that only one man was wounded.

Lieutenant Stannard ultimately brought his damaged ship back to an English port. His continuous gallantry in the presence of the enemy was magnificent, and his enterprise and resource not only caused losses to the Germans but saved his ship and many lives.

— The London Gazette, 16 August 1940

In the London Gazette of 5 December 1944, Stannard was Mentioned in Despatches for distinguished “services while ..(Commanding) H.M. Ship … Peacock … in the protection of convoys to North Russia in the face of attacks by U-boats.”

== Later life ==
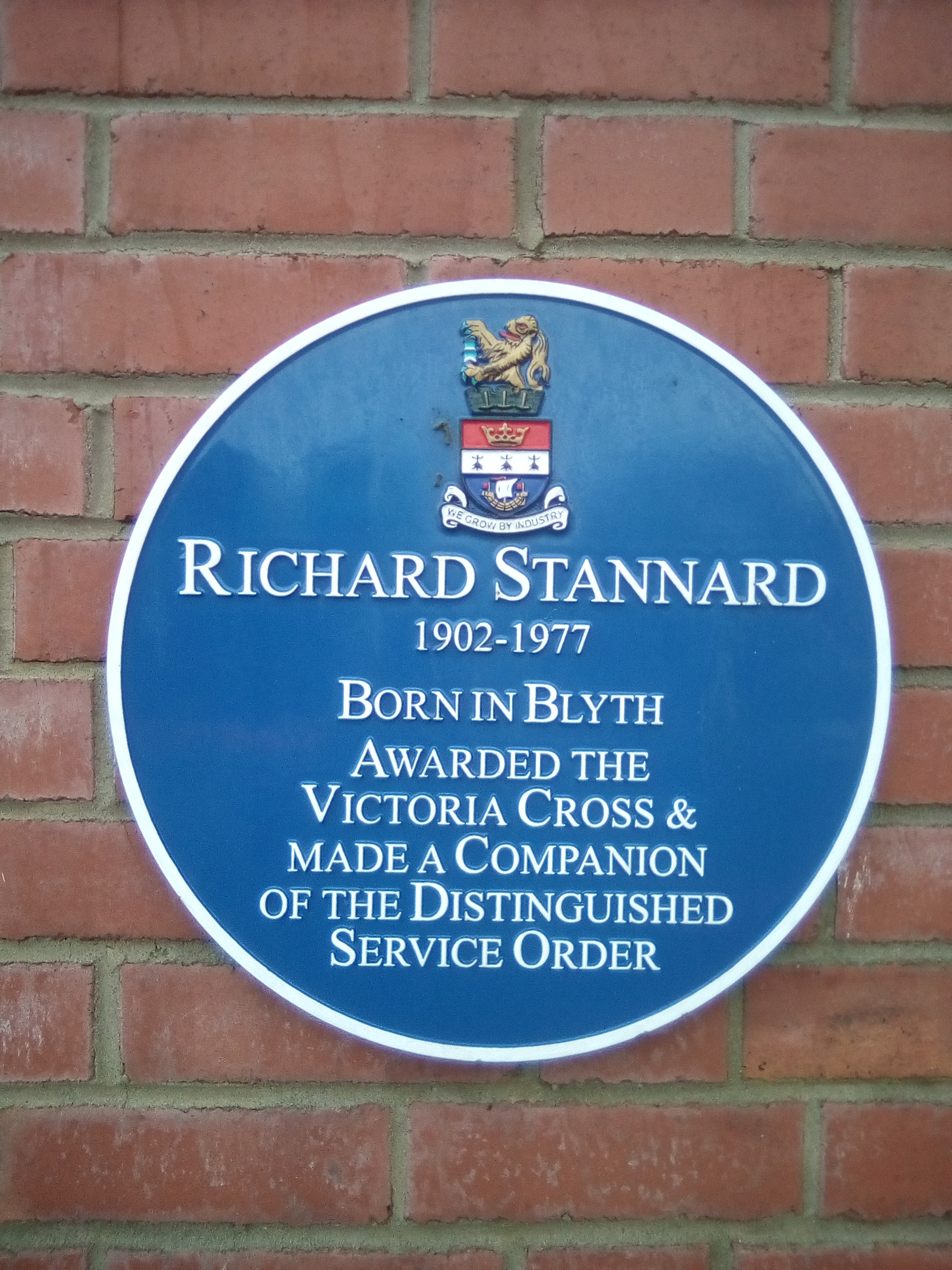
Richard Stannard Blue Plaque

Before and after the war Stannard settled in Essex before later emigrating to Australia. He died in Sydney on 22 July 1977. The local council erected a blue plaque to him on his former house in The Avenue, Loughton, Essex. In his birth town of Blyth, Northumberland a multi-use building on Bridge Street has been given the name Richard Stannard House (1999), and there is a blue plaque displayed there.
