= South Bank, Redcar and Cleveland =

Town in North Yorkshire, England

Coordinates: 54.58°N 1.17°W

South Bank: Tees Tilery or Slaggy Island
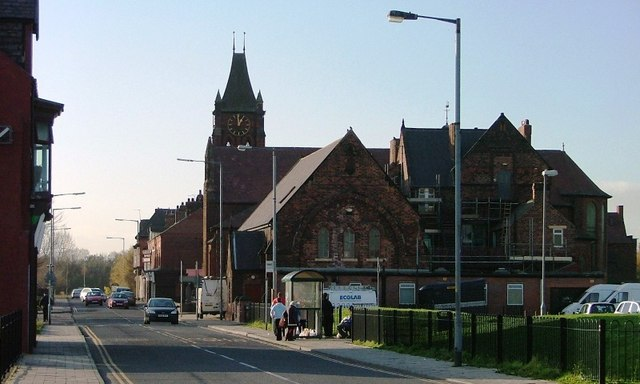
- Middlesbrough Road

- Location within North Yorkshire
- Population: 6,548 (ward 2011 census)
- OS grid reference: NZ535205
- Unitary authority: Redcar and Cleveland
- Ceremonial county: North Yorkshire
- Region: North East
- Country: England
- Sovereign state: United Kingdom
- Post town: MIDDLESBROUGH
- Postcode district: TS6
- Dialling code: 01642
- Police: Cleveland
- Fire: Cleveland
- Ambulance: North East
- UK Parliament: Redcar

South Bank is a former industrial town in the Redcar and Cleveland borough in North Yorkshire, England on the south bank of the River Tees. It is 3 miles (4.8 km) east of Middlesbrough and 6 miles (9.7 km) south-west of Redcar. The town is served by South Bank railway station.

The area forms part of the Teesside built-up area's Middlesbrough subdivision and is also a part of Greater Eston.

== Demographics ==
Within Redcar and Cleveland, the South Bank ward had a population of 6,548 at the 2011 census.

== History ==
Formerly known as "Tees Tilery", South Bank has a long history of steelmaking in the companies Bolckow Vaughan and Dorman Long, and shipbuilding at Smiths Dock Company. The area was also known by the nickname of "Slaggy Island" as it was surrounded by slag heaps.

South Bank was historically part of the township of Normanby in the ancient parish of Ormesby. A local government district covering the township was created in 1865, governed by a local board. A town hall was built for the district in 1878. Such districts were reconstituted as urban districts under the Local Government Act 1894. At the second meeting of the urban district council in January 1895 it voted to change the district's name from Normanby to "South Bank in Normanby", acknowledging that South Bank was the larger settlement within the district. The change of name was confirmed by North Riding County Council in May 1895.

South Bank in Normanby Urban District was abolished in 1915, being absorbed into the neighbouring Eston Urban District, which in turn was abolished in 1968 to become part of the County Borough of Teesside.

South Bank formed part of the Middlesbrough parliamentary constituency from 1867 until 1918.

=== Shipbuilding ===
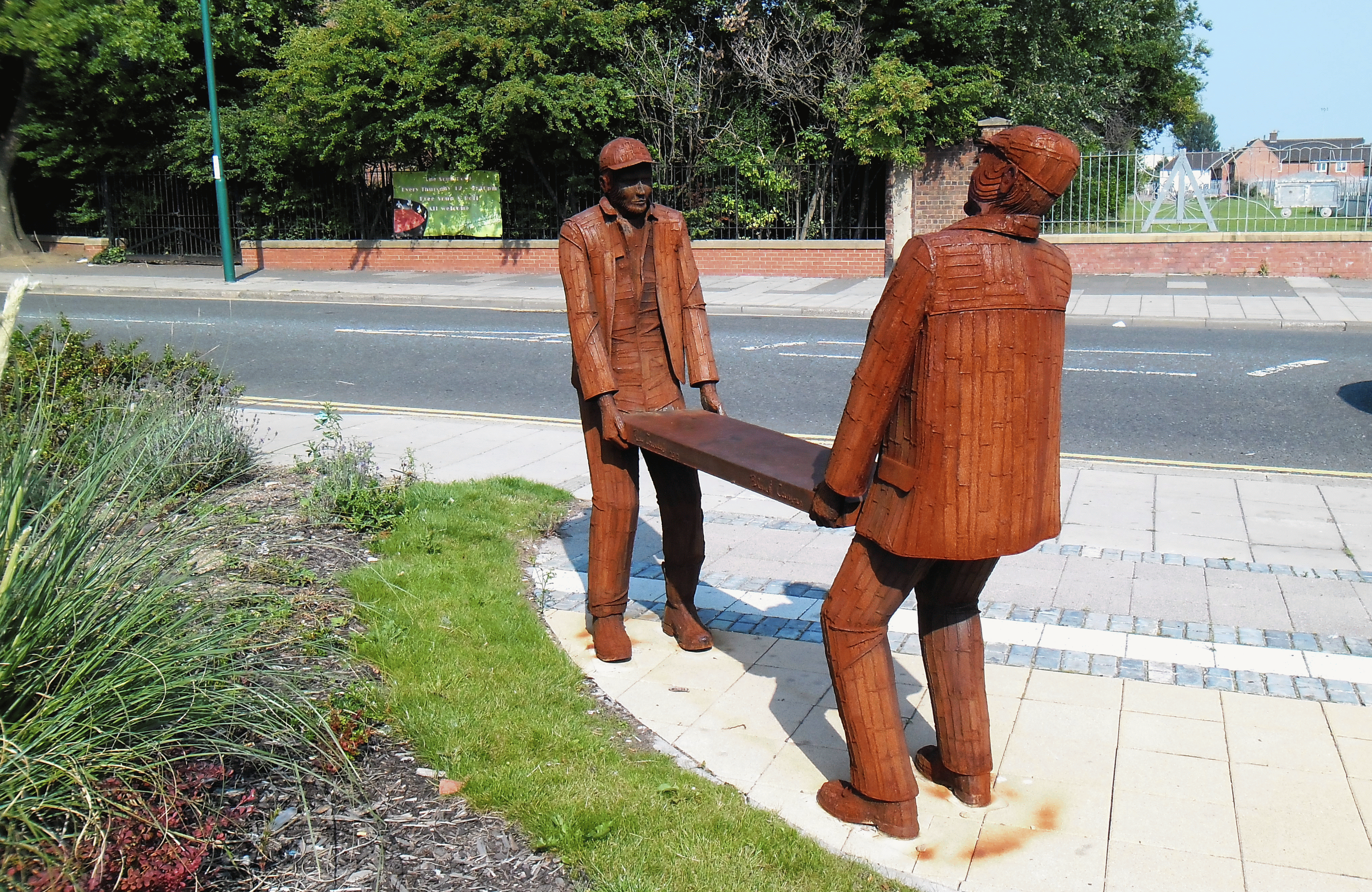
Bad Back: a sculpture for South Bank's Eco-Village, by Ray Lonsdale

In 1907, Smiths Dock Company, a firm of shipbuilders from North Shields, set up part of its business on the River Tees at South Bank. Smiths Dock closed its North Shields Yard in 1909 focussing its operations on the River Tees.

Smiths Dock built ships that served during the Second World War, including trawlers that the Admiralty requisitioned and converted to armed trawlers of the Royal Naval Patrol Service such as HMT Amethyst or HMT Arab, in which Lieutenant Richard Stannard (RNR) won the Victoria Cross. Smiths Dock prepared the design of the Flower-class corvette, an anti-submarine convoy escort of the Second World War.

In 1966 Smith's Dock merged with Swan Hunter & Wigham Richardson to form Associated Shipbuilders, later to become Swan Hunter Group.

In 1968, the company completed the first British-built and owned container ship, Manchester Challenge of 12,039 gross register tons. This was for operation on Manchester Liners new container service to ports on the St Lawrence Seaway, Canada. By 1971, the company had delivered three further ships of this design to Manchester Liners.

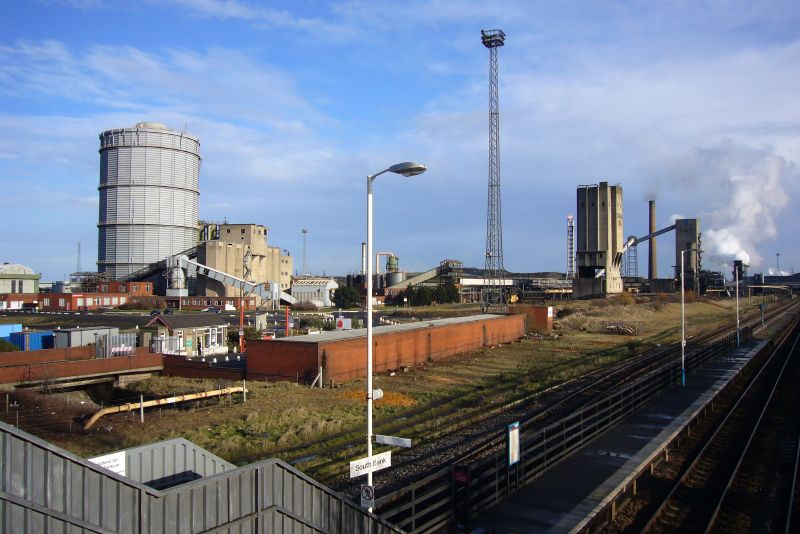
South Bank railway station

South Bank's shipbuilding era came to an end on 15 October 1986, when the last ship was launched from Smith's Dock, the shipyard itself closing in February 1987. The dock was re-used as Tees Offshore Base in 1988 and became home to offshore service industry companies including Tees Dockyard. Tees Dockyard was bought by Cammell Laird in 1998. On 15 April 2001, Cammell Laird closed the ship repair yard.

== Politics ==
South Bank is part of the Redcar Parliamentary constituency in the House of Commons.

=== Borough Council ===
In the 2023 local elections, the following members were returned to Redcar and Cleveland Borough Council:

Ward	Councillor	Party
South Bank	Izzy Attwood	Labour
South Bank	Susan Jennifer Jeffrey	Labour

== Places of worship ==
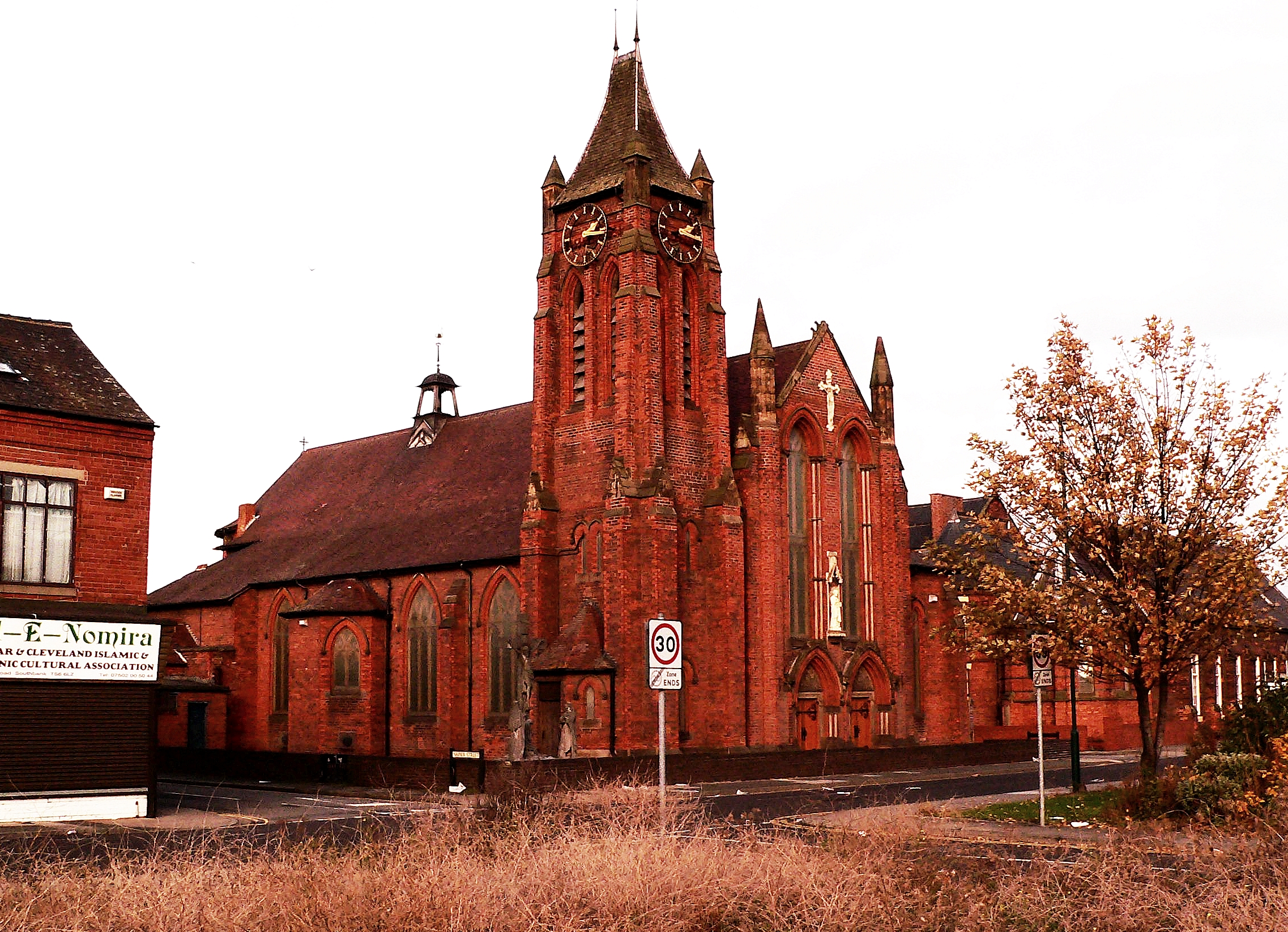
St Peter's Catholic Church

The Catholic parish of St. Peter was created in 1874, followed by St. Mary's, in nearby Grangetown, in 1886. Together they served the Irish and Lithuanian immigrants who worked in the smelting works by the River Tees. These days, South Bank's Catholic Church is part of a larger parish, which includes the churches of St. Anne's, Eston and St. Andrew's, Teesville. The joint parish is served from, and carries the name of, St. Andrew's Parish.

The Anglican Communion is represented by the church of St. John the Evangelist. The foundation stone for the church was laid in 1893, and was completed two years later in 1895. It is part of the Deanery of Middlesbrough within the Diocese of York.

The South Bank Baptist Church also dates from the late 19th century and the 'non-aligned' South Bank Mission, although not in its original building, was founded in 1908.

Other established places of worship include the Redcar and Cleveland Islamic and Quranic Cultural Association, which mostly serves the Bangladeshi community.

== Notable people ==
- Steve Buxton, footballer
- Ken Churchill, paralympic Athlete
- Greg Clark, Conservative MP, former Secretary of State for Business, Energy and Industrial Strategy.
- Jack Curtis, footballer
- Paul Daniels, magician
- Florence Easton, soprano
- Vin Garbutt, folk singer
- Wilf Mannion, footballer
- David Mulholland, artist
- Dusty Rhodes, footballer
- Paul Truscott (boxer)

== See also ==
- St Peter's Catholic College, South Bank
