= Polka (disambiguation) =

Polka is a dance style and genre of dance music.

Polka may also refer to:

== People ==
- Polka, singular feminine word for Polish people
- Pelagija "Polka" Belousova, first wife of Josip Broz Tito
- Omaru Polka, Japanese VTuber
- Polka, codename for the Women's Military Service of the Kampinos Group
- "Polka" Peter Cowan, member of Slow Gherkin
- Polka, enemy of Indian comic book superhero Nagraj

== Music ==
- Polka, piano work by Sergei Prokofiev
- Polka, one of the Three Easy Pieces (Stravinsky)
- Polka, one of the Three Czech Dances (Martinů)
- Polka, one of the Piano Pieces
- "Polka", 2014 single by Luce (singer)
- Polka, Philharmonic Orchestra recording of portions of Schwanda the Bagpiper
- Polka, piano composition by Walter Leigh
- Polka, 1962 instrumental by Madeleine Dring
- Polka, orchestral work by Lille Bror Söderlundh
- Polka, 1910 piano work by Karel Kovařovic
- Polka, two compositions by Mikhail Glinka
- Polkas, 1972 album by 101 Strings
- Polka, work by Rodrigo Riera
- Polka, 1949 composition by William Kroll
- Polka, 1935 orchestral work by David Moule-Evans
- Polka, 1952 composition by René Herbin
- "Polka", track from QE2 (album)
- Polka, 1941 composition by Dmitri Shostakovich
- "Polka", track from the soundtrack of Bitter Sweet (1940 film)
- "Polka", part of the starter set of the Optigan
- "Polka", 1850 work by Adolf von Henselt
- "Polka", 2008 single by Yves Klein Blue
- "Polka", dance by Vasily Agapkin
- "Polka", title of a 2013 Private Passions episode
- "Polka", composition by Aleksandr Morozov (composer)
- "Polka", 2020 single from Forever (Rosa Chemical album)
- "Polka", track from Yeah Jazz's album Short Stories

== Film and television ==
- Polka, entry in season 3 of Nicktoons Film Festival
- "Polka", episode of Kraft Television Theatre featuring Glenda Farrell
- "Polka", commercial featuring Brenda Ngxoli

== Literature ==
- Polka, 2001 book by Manuela Gretkowska
- Polka, work for which Robert Król was nominated for the Wisława Szymborska Award
- Polka, poem in Façade (entertainment)

== Ships ==
- Polka, Dance-class trawler
- Polka, Rudolf Krautschneider's ship
- Polka, launched in 1845
- Polka, wrecked in September 1850
- Polka, wrecked in December 1859
- Polka, wrecked in April 1862
- Polka, wrecked in February 1873
- Polka, wrecked in November 1881

== Other uses ==
- Gehyra polka, gecko species
- Polka, one of Le Tallec's patterns
- Polka, restaurant by Magdalena Gessler in Żelazowa Wola
- Polka, saloon in La fanciulla del West
- Polka, 1967 nuclear test as part of Operation Crosstie

== See also ==
- Pol-ka
- Pólka (disambiguation)
