= HMS Morris Dance =

HMS Morris Dance has been the name of two Royal Navy vessels of the 20th century:

- HMS Morris Dance (1919), a Dance-class minesweeper of World War I
- HMS Morris Dance (1939), a Dance-class trawler of World War II

== See also ==
- Morris dance, an English folk dance
- HMS Morris, an Admiralty M-class destroyer launched in 1914
