= HMS Sword Dance =

HMS Sword Dance may refer to the following ships of the Royal Navy:

- HMS Sword Dance (1918), a Dance-class minesweeper
- HMS Sword Dance (T132), a Dance-class trawler
