= List of ships built by Hall, Russell & Company (701–800) =

List of ships built by Aberdeen shipbuilders Hall, Russell & Company, from yard number 701 to 800.

The ships built in the sequence 701 to 800 cover the period 1929 to 1947. The yard produced a wide range of different vessels, initially continuing with trawlers for the British fishing industry before switching to naval vessels during World War II.

List of Hall, Russell & Company built ships (701–800)
Name	Image	Yard Number	Construction	Type	Year	Length Overall	Breadth	Depth	Tonnage	Ref(s)
Strathalbyn		701	Steel	Trawler - Steam	1929	117 feet 5 inches (35.79 m)	22 feet 1 inch (6.73 m)	12 feet 2 inches (3.71 m)	218 long tons (221 t)	
Strathalford		702	Steel	Trawler - Steam	1929	117 feet 5 inches (35.79 m)	22 feet 1 inch (6.73 m)	12 feet 2 inches (3.71 m)	218 long tons (221 t)	
Ben Roy		703	Steel	Trawler - Steam	1929	122 feet 7 inches (37.36 m)	23 feet 1 inch (7.04 m)	12 feet 4 inches (3.76 m)	260 long tons (260 t)	
Ben Rossal		704	Steel	Trawler - Steam	1929	122 feet 7 inches (37.36 m)	23 feet 1 inch (7.04 m)	12 feet 4 inches (3.76 m)	260 long tons (260 t)	
Taransay		705		Yacht	1930	102 feet 3 inches (31.17 m)	20 feet 1 inch (6.12 m)	11 feet 4 inches (3.45 m)	166 long tons (169 t)	
Freesia		706	Steel	Trawler - Steam	1930	86 feet 3 inches (26.29 m)	18 feet 7 inches (5.66 m)	10 feet (3.0 m)	96 long tons (98 t)	
Gertrude W.		707	Steel	Trawler - Steam	1930	86 feet 4 inches (26.31 m)	18 feet 6 inches (5.64 m)	9 feet 3 inches (2.82 m)	96 long tons (98 t)	
Rochea		708	Steel	Trawler - Steam	1930	86 feet 3 inches (26.29 m)	18 feet 7 inches (5.66 m)	10 feet (3.0 m)	96 long tons (98 t)	
Tolosa		709	Steel	Trawler - Steam/Oil	1930	87 feet (27 m)	19 feet (5.8 m)	10 feet (3.0 m)	126 long tons (128 t)	
Devatarra		710	Steel	Trawler - Steam/Oil	1930	87 feet 3 inches (26.59 m)	19 feet 1 inch (5.82 m)	10 feet (3.0 m)	126 long tons (128 t)	
Contender	Contendor (as HMT Contendor) underway	711	Steel	Trawler - Steam	1930	122 feet 5 inches (37.31 m)	22 feet 6 inches (6.86 m)	12 feet 2 inches (3.71 m)	236 long tons (240 t)	
Elise I Carnie	Elise I Carnie (as HMT George Robb) underway	712	Steel	Trawler - Steam	1930	117 feet 6 inches (35.81 m)	22 feet 1 inch (6.73 m)	12 feet 2 inches (3.71 m)	217 long tons (220 t)	
Barbara Robb	Barbara Rose	713	Steel	Trawler - Steam	1930	125 feet 4 inches (38.20 m)	23 feet 1 inch (7.04 m)	12 feet 8 inches (3.86 m)	263 long tons (267 t)	
Strathblair		714	Steel	Trawler - Steam	1930	117 feet 3 inches (35.74 m)	22 feet 1 inch (6.73 m)	13 feet (4.0 m)	216 long tons (219 t)	
Strathborve		715	Steel	Trawler - Steam	1930	117 feet 3 inches (35.74 m)	22 feet 1 inch (6.73 m)	13 feet (4.0 m)	216 long tons (219 t)	
Africana		716	Steel	Fisheries research vessel	1930	126 feet (38 m)	25 feet 1 inch (7.65 m)	12 feet 6 inches (3.81 m)	313 long tons (318 t)	
Simon Duhamel II		717	Steel	Trawler - Steam	1930	191 feet 5 inches (58.34 m)	31 feet 1 inch (9.47 m)	15 feet 9 inches (4.80 m)	928 long tons (943 t)	
Earl Sigurd		718	Steel	Passenger and Cargo	1930	118 feet 8 inches (36.17 m)	24 feet 2 inches (7.37 m)	10 feet 3 inches (3.12 m)	221 long tons (225 t)	
Van Der Goes		721	Steel	Fishing Vessel	1930	92 feet 4 inches (28.14 m)	20 feet 5 inches (6.22 m)	10 feet 4 inches (3.15 m)	138 long tons (140 t)	
Ben Idris		722	Steel	Trawler - Steam	1931	117 feet 7 inches (35.84 m)	22 feet 6 inches (6.86 m)	12 feet 1 inch (3.68 m)	232 long tons (236 t)	
St Sunniva		723	Steel	Passenger and Cargo	1931	252 feet 6 inches (76.96 m)	35 feet 2 inches (10.72 m)	15 feet 5 inches (4.70 m)	1,368 long tons (1,390 t)	
Liraña		724	Steel	Pair Fishing	1931	80 feet 6 inches (24.54 m)	19 feet 3 inches (5.87 m)	9 feet (2.7 m)	101 long tons (103 t)	
Berdin Gabea		725	Steel	Pair Fishing	1931	80 feet 6 inches (24.54 m)	19 feet 3 inches (5.87 m)	9 feet (2.7 m)	101 long tons (103 t)	
Thrift		726	Steel	Cargo - Collier (Coal)	1931	176 feet 5 inches (53.77 m)	27 feet 7 inches (8.41 m)	11 feet 2 inches (3.40 m)	648 long tons (658 t)	
Spray		727	Steel	Cargo Steamer - Collier (Coal)	1932	206 feet 3 inches (62.87 m)	32 feet 2 inches (9.80 m)	12 feet 6 inches (3.81 m)	960 long tons (980 t)	
Acklam Cross	Acklam Cross undergoing sea trials in 1933	728	Steel	Tug	1933	90 feet 5 inches (27.56 m)	22 feet 1 inch (6.73 m)	10 feet 6 inches (3.20 m)	150 long tons (150 t)	
Bluff		729	Steel	Trawler - Steam	1934	125 feet 7 inches (38.28 m)	23 feet 6 inches (7.16 m)	12 feet 8 inches (3.86 m)	262 long tons (266 t)	
Trenchemer		730	Steel	Sailing Yacht	1934	72 feet 2 inches (22.00 m)	21 feet 1 inch (6.43 m)	14 feet 6 inches (4.42 m)	37 long tons (38 t)	
Babiana		731	Steel	Trawler - Steam	1935	125 feet 7 inches (38.28 m)	23 feet 6 inches (7.16 m)	12 feet 8 inches (3.86 m)	262 long tons (266 t)	
Vikings		732	Steel	Trawler - Steam	1935	208 feet 5 inches (63.53 m)	34 feet 6 inches (10.52 m)	17 feet 9 inches (5.41 m)	1,158 long tons (1,177 t)	
Aristea		733	Steel	Trawler - Steam	1935	125 feet 7 inches (38.28 m)	23 feet 6 inches (7.16 m)	12 feet 8 inches (3.86 m)	261 long tons (265 t)	
Crassula		734	Steel	Trawler - Steam	1935	125 feet 7 inches (38.28 m)	23 feet 6 inches (7.16 m)	12 feet 8 inches (3.86 m)	261 long tons (265 t)	
Ala-Biar		735	Steel	Motor Fishing Vessel	1936	85 feet 3 inches (25.98 m)	19 feet 7 inches (5.97 m)	11 feet (3.4 m)	120 long tons (120 t)	
Ala-Izan		736	Steel	Motor Fishing Vessel	1936	85 feet 3 inches (25.98 m)	19 feet 7 inches (5.97 m)	11 feet (3.4 m)	120 long tons (120 t)	
Anemone		737	Steel	Trawler - Steam	1936	131 feet 2 inches (39.98 m)	24 feet 1 inch (7.34 m)	13 feet 1 inch (3.99 m)	296 long tons (301 t)	
Morea		738	Steel	Trawler - Steam	1936	131 feet 2 inches (39.98 m)	24 feet 1 inch (7.34 m)	13 feet 1 inch (3.99 m)	296 long tons (301 t)	
Star of Orkney	Star of Orkney in service with the Royal Navy as HM Trawler Star of Orkney	741	Steel	Trawler - Steam	1936	126 feet 1 inch (38.43 m)	23 feet 6 inches (7.16 m)	12 feet 8 inches (3.86 m)	272 long tons (276 t)	(Note: Design formed the basis of the Round table class military trawler design for Admiralty. Served during WW2 as HMT Star of Orkney, not officially considered a member of the Round table class.)
St. Clair		742	Steel	Passenger and Cargo	1937	253 feet 4 inches (77.22 m)	38 feet 1 inch (11.61 m)	15 feet 4 inches (4.67 m)	1,637 long tons (1,663 t)	
Barrage		743	Steel	Boom defence vessel Bar class	1938	150 feet (46 m)	32 feet 0 inches (9.75 m)	17 feet 1 inch (5.21 m)	533 long tons (542 t)	
Barranca		744	Steel	Boom defence vessel Bar class	1938	150 feet (46 m)	32 feet 0 inches (9.75 m)	17 feet 1 inch (5.21 m)	533 long tons (542 t)	
Muriel		745		Barge	1938	57 feet 10 inches (17.63 m)	19 feet 3 inches (5.87 m)	7 feet 5 inches (2.26 m)		
Protea		746	Steel	Trawler - Steam	1938	131 feet 2 inches (39.98 m)	24 feet 2 inches (7.37 m)	13 feet 1 inch (3.99 m)	307 long tons (312 t)	
Petunia		747	Steel	Trawler - Steam	1938	131 feet 2 inches (39.98 m)	24 feet 2 inches (7.37 m)	13 feet 1 inch (3.99 m)	307 long tons (312 t)	
Fairway	Fairway at Inverness	748		Dredger - Grab	1938	65 feet 2 inches (19.86 m)	21 feet 7 inches (6.58 m)	7 feet 6 inches (2.29 m)		
Earl of Zetland	Earl of Zetland at Lerwick	749	Steel	Passenger and Cargo	1939	154 feet 9 inches (47.17 m)	30 feet 8 inches (9.35 m)	9 feet 8 inches (2.95 m)	548 long tons (557 t)	
Auchmacoy		750	Steel	Cargo - Coaster	1939	114 feet 6 inches (34.90 m)	23 feet 1 inch (7.04 m)	8 feet 4 inches (2.54 m)	255 long tons (259 t)	
Bois Rose		751	Steel	Trawler	1940	218 feet 3 inches (66.52 m)	35 feet 6 inches (10.82 m)	18 feet 3 inches (5.56 m)	1,374 long tons (1,396 t)	
Olive		752	Steel	Trawler - Minesweeper (Royal Navy); Tree class	1940	150 feet (46 m)	27 feet 6 inches (8.38 m)	15 feet (4.6 m)	530 long tons (540 t)	
Pine		753	Steel	Trawler - Minesweeper (Royal Navy); Tree class	1940	150 feet (46 m)	27 feet 6 inches (8.38 m)	15 feet (4.6 m)	530 long tons (540 t)	
Marguerite		754	Steel	Corvette (Royal Navy); Flower class	1940	190 feet 6 inches (58.06 m)	33 feet 1 inch (10.08 m)	17 feet 7 inches (5.36 m)	925 long tons (940 t)	
Marigold		755	Steel	Corvette (Royal Navy); Flower class	1941	190 feet 6 inches (58.06 m)	33 feet 1 inch (10.08 m)	17 feet 7 inches (5.36 m)	925 long tons (940 t)	
Mignonette	HMS Mignonette	756	Steel	Corvette (Royal Navy); Flower class	1941	190 feet 6 inches (58.06 m)	33 feet 1 inch (10.08 m)	17 feet 7 inches (5.36 m)	925 long tons (940 t)	
Polka		757	Steel	Trawler - Minesweeper (Royal Navy); Dance class	1941	154 feet 5 inches (47.07 m)	27 feet 6 inches (8.38 m)	14 feet 2 inches (4.32 m)	511 long tons (519 t)	
Quadrille		758	Steel	Trawler - Minesweeper (Royal Navy); Dance class	1941	154 feet 5 inches (47.07 m)	27 feet 6 inches (8.38 m)	14 feet 2 inches (4.32 m)	511 long tons (519 t)	
Othello		759	Steel	Trawler - Minesweeper (Royal Navy) Shakespearian class	1941	164 feet (50 m)	27 feet 9 inches (8.46 m)	11 feet (3.4 m)	545 long tons (554 t)	
Coriander	HMS Coriander	760	Steel	Corvette (Royal Navy); Flower class	1941	190 feet 6 inches (58.06 m)	33 feet 1 inch (10.08 m)	17 feet 7 inches (5.36 m)	925 long tons (940 t)	
Loosestrife	HMS Loosestrife	761	Steel	Corvette (Royal Navy); Flower class	1941	190 feet 6 inches (58.06 m)	33 feet 1 inch (10.08 m)	17 feet 7 inches (5.36 m)	925 long tons (940 t)	
Stroma	HMT Stroma	762	Steel	Trawler - Minesweeper (Royal Navy); Isles class	1942	150 feet (46 m)	27 feet 6 inches (8.38 m)	15 feet (4.6 m)	545 long tons (554 t)	
Sir Galahad	HMT Sir Galahad	763	Steel	Trawler - Minesweeper (Royal Navy); Round Table class	1942	125 feet (38 m)	25 feet 6 inches (7.77 m)	13 feet 9 inches (4.19 m)	103 long tons (105 t)	
Sir Gareth	HMT Sir Gareth	764	Steel	Trawler - Minesweeper (Royal Navy); Round Table class	1942	125 feet (38 m)	25 feet 6 inches (7.77 m)	13 feet 9 inches (4.19 m)	108 long tons (110 t)	
Test	HMS Test	765	Steel	Frigate (Royal Navy); River class	1942	283 feet (86 m)	36 feet 6 inches (11.13 m)	17 feet 6 inches (5.33 m)	1,370 long tons (1,390 t)	
Teviot	HMS Teviot	766	Steel	Frigate (Royal Navy); River class	1942	283 feet (86 m)	36 feet 6 inches (11.13 m)	17 feet 6 inches (5.33 m)	1,370 long tons (1,390 t)	
Empire Cherub		767	Steel	Tug (Royal Navy)	1942	107 feet 3 inches (32.69 m)	26 feet 1 inch (7.95 m)	13 feet 6 inches (4.11 m)	262 long tons (266 t)	
Sir Kay	HMT Sir Kay	768	Steel	Trawler - Minesweeper (Royal Navy); Round Table class	1943	125 feet (38 m)	25 feet 6 inches (7.77 m)	13 feet 9 inches (4.19 m)	108 long tons (110 t)	
Sir Lamorak	HMT Sir Lamorak	769	Steel	Trawler - Minesweeper (Royal Navy) Round Table class	1943	125 feet (38 m)	25 feet 6 inches (7.77 m)	13 feet 9 inches (4.19 m)	106 long tons (108 t)	
Helford	HMS Helford	770	Steel	Frigate (Royal Navy); River class	1943	283 feet (86 m)	36 feet 6 inches (11.13 m)	17 feet 6 inches (5.33 m)	1,370 long tons (1,390 t)	
Tees	HMS Tees	771	Steel	Frigate (Royal Navy); River class	1943	283 feet (86 m)	36 feet 6 inches (11.13 m)	17 feet 6 inches (5.33 m)	1,370 long tons (1,390 t)	
Lochy	HMS Lochy lying at anchor	772	Steel	Frigate (Royal Navy); River class	1944	283 feet (86 m)	36 feet 6 inches (11.13 m)	17 feet 6 inches (5.33 m)	1,370 long tons (1,390 t)	
Edenwood		773	Steel	Cargo	1943	256 feet 3 inches (78.11 m)	39 feet 1 inch (11.91 m)	16 feet 6 inches (5.03 m)	1,874 long tons (1,904 t)	
Annan	HMS Annan	774	Steel	Frigate (Royal Navy); River class	1944	283 feet (86 m)	36 feet 6 inches (11.13 m)	17 feet 6 inches (5.33 m)	1,370 long tons (1,390 t)	
Bigbury Bay	HMS Bigbury Bay in 1945	775	Steel	Frigate (Royal Navy); Bay class	1945	286 feet (87 m)	38 feet 6 inches (11.73 m)	17 feet 9 inches (5.41 m)	1,600 long tons (1,600 t)	(Note: Ordered as Loch-class anti submarine frigate HMS Loch Carloway. Order modified to Bay-class anti aircraft frigate during build, launched as HMS Bigbury Bay.)
Avonwood		776	Steel	Cargo	1944	256 feet 3 inches (78.11 m)	39 feet 1 inch (11.91 m)	16 feet 6 inches (5.03 m)	1,874 long tons (1,904 t)	
Thurso Bay		779	Steel	Frigate (Royal Navy); Bay class	1945	286 feet (87 m)	36 feet 6 inches (11.13 m)	17 feet 9 inches (5.41 m)		(Note: Ordered as Loch-class anti submarine frigate HMS Loch Muick. Order modified to Bay-class anti aircraft frigate during build, launched as HMS Thurso Bay. Mothballed and diverted to Chatham for conversion to hydrographic vessel, renamed HMS Owen.)
Corfen		781	Steel	Cargo Steamer - Collier (Coal)	1944	257 feet (78 m)	39 feet 5 inches (12.01 m)	16 feet 7 inches (5.05 m)	1,867 long tons (1,897 t)	
LCT(3) 7039		782		Landing Craft - Tank (Mk.3)	1944	175 feet 5 inches (53.47 m)	30 feet 1 inch (9.17 m)	8 feet 9 inches (2.67 m)		
LCT(3) 7040		783		Landing Craft - Tank (Mk.3)	1944	175 feet 5 inches (53.47 m)	30 feet 1 inch (9.17 m)	8 feet 9 inches (2.67 m)		
LCT(3) 7041		784		Landing Craft - Tank (Mk.3)	1944	175 feet 5 inches (53.47 m)	30 feet 1 inch (9.17 m)	8 feet 9 inches (2.67 m)		
Firebeam		785	Steel	Cargo Steamer - Collier (Coal)	1945	247 feet (75 m)	39 feet 6 inches (12.04 m)	16 feet 6 inches (5.03 m)	1,554 long tons (1,579 t)	
Transport Ferry TF 30		786		Ferry - Military (Royal Navy)	1945	330 feet 10 inches (100.84 m)	54 feet 2 inches (16.51 m)	18 feet 7 inches (5.66 m)	1,899 long tons (1,929 t)	
Capable		787	Steel	Tug (Royal Navy)	1945	165 feet 5 inches (50.42 m)	34 feet 1 inch (10.39 m)	18 feet 7 inches (5.66 m)		
Sir Joseph Swan		788		Cargo Steamer - Collier (Coal)	1945	243 feet 4 inches (74.17 m)	29 feet 5 inches (8.97 m)	18 feet 7 inches (5.66 m)	1,554 long tons (1,579 t)	
Lestris		789	Steel	Cargo Steamer	1946	290 feet 9 inches (88.62 m)	43 feet 7 inches (13.28 m)	19 feet 7 inches (5.97 m)	2,025 long tons (2,057 t)	
St. Clement		791		Cargo - Coaster	1946	170 feet 5 inches (51.94 m)	31 feet 1 inch (9.47 m)	11 feet (3.4 m)	460 long tons (470 t)	
Gilia		793		Trawler - Steam	1946	160 feet 5 inches (48.90 m)	28 feet 1 inch (8.56 m)	15 feet (4.6 m)	515 long tons (523 t)	
Godetia		794		Trawler - Steam	1946	162 feet (49 m)	28 feet (8.5 m)	14 feet (4.3 m)	515 long tons (523 t)	
Lunan		795	Steel	Cargo	1946	216 feet (66 m)	34 feet (10 m)	12 feet 2 inches (3.71 m)	1,023 long tons (1,039 t)	
Vikings		796		Trawler - Steam	1947	207 feet 1 inch (63.12 m)	39 feet (12 m)	24 feet 9 inches (7.54 m)	1,166 long tons (1,185 t)	
Carlo		797	Steel	Cargo Steamer	1947	284 feet 3 inches (86.64 m)	42 feet 2 inches (12.85 m)	15 feet 5 inches (4.70 m)	1,799 long tons (1,828 t)	
Padua		799		Trawler - Steam	1947	226 feet 5 inches (69.01 m)	36 feet (11 m)	24 feet 10 inches (7.57 m)	1,296 long tons (1,317 t)	
Aberdonian Coast		800		Cargo	1947	260 feet (79 m)	40 feet 1 inch (12.22 m)	15 feet 6 inches (4.72 m)	1,258 long tons (1,278 t)	

== Notes ==
- Where available, vessel measurements taken from Lloyd's Register, giving registered length, beam and draft. Hall, Russell and Company's own measurements typically are length overall, beam and moulded depth.
- Yard Number 719, 720 unused, likely cancelled.
- Yard Number 739, 740 unused, likely cancelled.
- Yard Number 777, 778 unused, likely cancelled.
- Yard Number 780 unused, likely cancelled.
- Yard Number 790 unused, likely cancelled.
- Yard Number 792 unused, likely cancelled.
- Yard Number 798 unused, likely cancelled.

== Bibliography ==
- Lavery, Brian (2006). River-Class Frigates and the Battle of the Atlantic: A Technical and Social History. London: National Maritime Museum. ISBN 0-94-806573-7.
- Lambert, J; Raven, A (2000). Flower Class Corvettes in World War II. White Raven Press.
