= HMCS Annan =

HMCS Annan was the name of multiple ships of the Royal Canadian Navy:

- HMCS Annan (K297), a River-class frigate from World War II, transferred to the US and renamed Natchez.
- HMCS Annan (K404), a River-class frigate originally constructed for the Royal Navy and transferred to Canada during World War II.

== Battle honours ==
- Atlantic, 1944
- North Sea, 1945
