= HMS Sword Dance (1918) =

History

United Kingdom
- Name: ET 10
- Owner: War Department
- Launched: 1918
- Out of service: Transferred to Royal Navy April 1919

United Kingdom
- Name: HMS Sword Dance
- Acquired: April 1919
- Fate: Mined and sunk 24 June 1919, remains blown up 17 September 1919

General characteristics
- Class & type: Dance-class minesweeper
- Displacement: 265 long tons (269 t)
- Length: 130 ft (39.6 m) pp
- Beam: 26 ft 3 in (8.00 m)
- Draught: 3 ft 6 in (1.07 m)
- Propulsion: 1 × 450 ihp (340 kW) compound steam engine; 2 shaft tunnel screws
- Speed: 9.5 kn (10.9 mph; 17.6 km/h)
- Complement: 22–26
- Armament: 1 ×6-pounder gun

HMS Sword Dance was a Dance-class minesweeper of the British Royal Navy. Sword Dance was built by Lytham Ship Building in 1918, and in 1919 was deployed as part of the North Russia intervention in the Russian Civil War. On 24 June 1919, the ship was mined while operating against the Bolsheviks on the Dvina River, south of Archangel, Russia.

== Design and construction ==
In July 1917, the Royal Navy had a requirement for a shallow-draught minesweeper, suitable for operations in harbours and rivers, and it was suggested that the 'tunnel tugs' being built for the War Department for river operations in Mesopotamia, were suitable for this role (as part of the Mesopotamian campaign), and in October that year, it was agreed that the Royal Navy would purchase six of the tugs which were under construction, with a further four more purchased in December 1917. The ten ships were based at Dunkirk in 1918, operating off the Flanders coast.

In April 1919, four more ships were transferred from the War Department for service in North Russia in the North Russia intervention in the Russian Civil War. One of these ships, ET 10, was built by the Lytham Shipbuilding and Engineering Company, at their Lytham St Annes, Lancashire yard in 1918, and renamed Sword Dance on transfer.

Sword Dance was 130 ft (39.6 m) long between perpendiculars, with a beam of 26 ft 3 in (8.00 m) and a draught of 3 ft 6 in (1.07 m). Displacement was 265 long tons (269 t). The ship was powered by a 450 ihp (340 kW) compound steam engine, which powered two propellers mounted in tunnels under the hull to minimise the draught. Speed was 9.5 kn (10.9 mph; 17.6 km/h). The ship had a crew of 22–26 officers and men.

== Service ==
After joining the Royal Navy, Sword Dance underwent modifications for her new role. She was fitted with minesweeping and minelaying equipment, while modifications for the weather extremes of North Russia included the fitting heaters to warm up aircraft engines in cold weather and mosquito netting. Armament consisted of a single 6-pounder gun. After boarding up the sides of the ship, Sword Dance was towed to the Arctic. On 7 June 1919, Sword Dance arrived at Yukanski (now Ostrovnoy, Murmansk Oblast), along with sister ships Fandango, Morris Dance and Step Dance, joining the monitor Humber which had arrived the previous day. She was deployed on the Northern Dvina river in support of interventionist forces.

While a considerable force had been assembled to support operations along the Dvina, including six monitors and six shallow draught river gunboats and well as the four minesweepers, the river was too shallow in places for much of the force to reach the front line or support the planned advance of British forces, with the minesweepers having the shallowest draught, and hence able to reach as far as Kotlas. On 20 June 1919, British and White Russian forces under General Edmund Ironside launched an attack, with support of the Royal Navy with the aim of capturing Bolshevik defences at Topsa and Troitsa on the Dvina, as part of an offensive with the aim of reaching Kotlas. The Bolsheviks launched a counterattack on 21 June, which was repelled by artillery fire from the gunboat Cockchafer. Sword Dance was stationed on the Dvina near Troitsa on 24 June, when it was noticed that some of the markers indicating the swept channel had moved, so the minesweeper set out to relay the markers. While doing this, she detonated a mine and sank, killing one crew member and wounding the commanding officer, Lieutenant Alan Halliley. The ship had sunk in shallow waters, with her bridge and Stem still above water, and attempts were made to salvage the ship, but the withdrawal of British troops from North Russia brought these attempts to an end, and the remains of Sword Dance were blown up on 17 September 1919. Halliley was awarded the Distinguished Service Order for his service in North Russia both before and after Sword Dance's sinking, while Sword Dance's First Lieutenant, Sub-Lieutenant Archibald Dunn, was awarded the Distinguished Service Cross.
