= Pólka =

Pólka may refer to the following places:

- Pólka, Łódź Voivodeship (central Poland)
- Pólka, Masovian Voivodeship (east-central Poland)
- Pólka, Pomeranian Voivodeship (north Poland)
