= HMS Sword Dance (T132) =

HMS Sword Dance (T132) was a Dance-class naval trawler built by Henry Robb Ltd in Leith. She was laid down on 2 March 1940, and launched from the yard on 3 September 1940. She was commissioned into the Royal Navy on 20th of January 1941. It was considered to be part of "The Little Ship Navy" and carried out minesweeping and anti-submarine duties. It is similar to Tree-class trawlers and Isles-class trawlers.

== Dimensions ==
Sword Dance had a overall length of 150 feet (46 m) or 164 ft (50 m), a beam of 27 ft 6 in (8.38 m) or 27 ft 8 in (8.43 m) with a draught of 14 ft 6 in (4.42 m) or 11 ft 1 in (3.38 m). She had a complement of 35 or 40 officers and ratings and her coal-fired reciprocating engine had one shaft producing 850 indicated horsepower (630 kW). Her single propeller gave her a speed of 11.5 knots (21.3 km/h; 13.2 mph) or 12 knots (22 km/h; 14 mph). She was equipped with one 4-inch (102 mm) gun and three 20-millimetre (0.79 in) anti-aircraft guns. Her displacement was 530 tons or 545 tons.

== Fate ==
During the early hours of 5 July 1942, whilst acting as escort to the East coast convoy WN 5, Sword Dance was rammed in dense fog by one of merchant ships of the convoy, Thyra-II. The starboard coalbunker was holed in, the engine room rapidly flooded, and Sword Dance sank in less than an hour. The ship was in Moray Firth when she sank.
