= HMS Morris Dance (1939) =

World War II Royal Navy trawler

HMS Morris Dance was a Dance-class naval trawler of the British Royal Navy. Morris Dance was built by the Goole Shipbuilding & Repairing Co. Ltd on 9 September 1939, and was sold in 1947 to private interests from Norway.

== Origins of its name ==
It was named after a traditional English folk dance called a 'Morris dance'.

Morris Dance was purchased for Stavanger in 1947 and later refitted into the expedition ship Tottan, then Kvitfjell and later the Swedish Seiko, Deep Diver and Sjövik.
