= Rudolf Krautschneider =

Czech sailor, writer and illustrator

Rudolf Krautschneider (born 22 August 1943) is a Czech sailor, writer and illustrator.

== Biography ==
Krautschneider was born in Vienna in 1943 into the family of an Austrian father and a Moravian mother, and was raised in Znojmo.

In 1977, he sailed beyond the Arctic Circle with his first ship named Vela. He later sailed to Svalbard and the Falkland Islands with his ship Polka, and circled Antarctica on Polárka. He later built a replica of Magellan's ship Victoria.

He wrote most of his books in Czech and some in Polish (one of them, Świat polskich żaglonautów, is about Polish sailors including Krystyna Chojnowska-Liskiewicz, Henryk Jaskuła, Karol Olgierd Borchardt and Leonid Teliga). One of his books, Plachetnicí kolem světa pro pírko tučňáka, was translated into English as Around the World for the Feather of a Penguin (1999).

He also made documentary films during his travels.

== Books ==
All books are in Czech, unless otherwise stated.

- Lidé a oceán (1991, 2015, 2016)
- Jak nelze zabít město (1992)
- Dopisy z ostrova tučňáků (1995, 2014)
- Legenda dobyvatelů (1997)
- Plachetnicí kolem světa pro pírko tučňáka (1999, 2012, 2014)
  - also in Polish (Dookoła świata po piórko pingwina, 1999)
  - also in English (Around the World for the Feather of a Penguin, 1999)
- Ludojad (2002, in Polish only)
- Niezamknięta duża pętla (2003, in Polish only)
- Historie libštátského jachtingu (2005)
- Co přinesly vlny a odvál vítr (2006, 2014, 2017)
  - also in Polish (Co przyniosły fale i wiatr, 2006)
- Nie zamknięta duża pętla (2007, in Polish only)
- Ocean, samotny żeglarz i jego łódź (2007, in Polish only)
- Tylko jedna może być pierwsza (2008, in Polish only)
- Kluci ze Starého Města (2008)
- Ring volný - třetí kolo (2009)
- Moře solí země (2010, 2019)
- Vnučka oceánu (2010, 2014)
  - also in Polish (Wnuczka oceanu, 2015)
- Život v kleči aneb Za hory za doly (2011)
- Znojemská trilogie (2014)
- Świat polskich żaglonautów (2015, in Polish only)
- Chlapec od řeky Dyje (2018)
- Sobre las Islas Canarias, el yate, el mar y la añoranza (2019, in Spanish)
- Zvorat oceán i nepevninu (2020)
- Obyvatelé suchého moře (2021)
- Ostrovy pěti oceánů (2021)
- Ve vodě na suchu (2022)
