= List of shipwrecks in September 1850 =

The list of shipwrecks in September 1850 includes ships sunk, foundered, wrecked, grounded, or otherwise lost during September 1850.

== 1 September ==
List of shipwrecks: 1 September 1850
Ship	State	Description
Farmer	United Kingdom	The ship sprang a leak and caught fire due to her cargo of quicklime getting wet. She put back to Sunderland, County Durham.
Juniper	United Kingdom	The ship struck rocks off Cape Pillar, Van Diemen's Land. She was subsequently driven ashore and wrecked at St. George's Head. She was on a voyage from Liverpool to Porto, Portugal and Sydney, New South Wales.

== 2 September ==
List of shipwrecks: 2 September 1850
Ship	State	Description
Archibald	United Kingdom	The ship ran aground on the Burbo Bank, in Liverpool Bay. She was on a voyage from Liverpool, Lancashire to Gibraltar. She was refloated and put back to Liverpool.
Borvena Hendrik	Hamburg	The ship was abandoned in the Atlantic Ocean. All on board were rescued by Siren (United Kingdom). Borvena Handrik was on a voyage from Lisbon, Portugal to Hamburg.
Erin	United Kingdom	The steamship ran aground at Smyrna, Ottoman Empire. She was on a voyage from Smyrna to Southampton, Hampshire. She was refloated and resumed her voyage.
Jeune Levine	France	The ship was driven ashore at Wells-next-the-Sea, Norfolk, United Kingdom. She was on a voyage from Warkworth, Northumberland, United Kingdom to Caen, Calvados. She was refloated and resumed her voyage.

== 3 September ==
List of shipwrecks: 3 September 1850
Ship	State	Description
Jessie	United Kingdom	The ship ran aground on Anholt, Denmark. She was refloated but capsized 18 nautical miles (33 km) north of Anholt. Her crew were rescued by James (United Kingdom).
Johanne	Sweden	The brig was abandoned in the Atlantic Ocean. Her crew were rescued by Sophia (United Kingdom), which lost two of her crew during the rescued. Johanne was on a voyage from Charleston, South Carolina, United States to Bremen.
Johannes	Norway	The galiot was driven ashore at Marstrand, Sweden. She was refloated the next day but was declared a total loss.

== 4 September ==
List of shipwrecks: 4 September 1850
Ship	State	Description
Amphion	Sweden	The sloop sprang a leak and sank in the North Sea (55°30′N 2°15′E). Her crew were rescued by Johanna (Denmark). Amphion was on a voyage from Hartlepool, County Durham to Helensburgh, Dunbartonshire, United Kingdom.
Belize	United Kingdom	The ship was driven ashore in the Blaska Sound. She was on a voyage from Saint Petersburg to Vyborg, Grand Duchy of Finland.
Cetto	Austrian Empire	The barque was sighted off Constantinople, Ottoman Empire whilst on a voyage from Galaţi, Ottoman Empire to Cork, United Kingdom. No further trace, presumed foundered with the loss of all hands.
Margaret Wallace	United Kingdom	The ship was wrecked on Cape Sable Island, Nova Scotia, British North America. Her crew were rescued. She was on a voyage from Saint John, New Brunswick, British North America to Liverpool, Lancashire.
Neptune	United Kingdom	The ship was wrecked on the Newcombe Sand, in the North Sea off the coast of Suffolk. Her crew were rescued. She was on a voyage from Llanelly, Glamorgan to Lowestoft, Suffolk.

== 5 September ==
List of shipwrecks: 5 September 1850
Ship	State	Description
Ann Eliza	United Kingdom	The ship sprang a leak and foundered in the North Sea off Peterhead, Aberdeenshire. Her crew were rescued. She was on a voyage from Glasgow, Renfrewshire to Stettin.
Camille	France	The ship was driven ashore at Happisburgh, Norfolk, United Kingdom in a derelict condition, having previously been abandoned by her crew, who were rescued. She was on a voyage from Newcastle upon Tyne, Northumberland, United Kingdom to Toulon, Var.
Coronet	United Kingdom	The ship was driven ashore in the Matane River.
Covenanter	United Kingdom	The ship was driven ashore in the Matane River. She was on a voyage from Quebec City, Province of Canada, British North America to Liverpool, Lancashire.

== 6 September ==
List of shipwrecks: 6 September 1850
Ship	State	Description
Agnes	United Kingdom	The ship was wrecked east of Logan Point, Cornwall. Her crew were rescued. She was on a voyage from Llanelly, Glamorgan to Plymouth, Devon.
Enigheden	Norway	The ship was abandoned in the Atlantic Ocean. Her crew were rescued by Viriates (Portugal). Enigheden was on a voyage from Torrevieja, Spain to Christiansand.
Gustav	Danzig	The ship was wrecked on the west coast of Denmark. Her crew were rescued. She was on a voyage from Aberdeen, United Kingdom to Danzig.
Harmonie	United Kingdom	The ship was wrecked near "Eitzenstock". Her crew were rescued She was on a voyage from Harwich, Essex to Hamburg.
USS Yorktown	United States Navy	The sloop-of-war was wrecked on a reef off Maio Island, Cape Verde, Portugal. Her crew survived.

== 7 September ==
List of shipwrecks: 7 September 1850
Ship	State	Description
Cowslip	United Kingdom	The ship ran aground at Aegina, Greece. She was refloated.
Kong Sverri	Norway	The ship was taken in to Petit-Métis, Province of Canada, British North America in a derelict condition.
Tre Broder	Sweden	The jacht was driven ashore near Kalmar. Her crew were rescued.

== 8 September ==
List of shipwrecks: 8 September 1850
Ship	State	Description
Ann and Eliza	United Kingdom	The ship sprang a leak and foundered off Peterhead, Aberdeenshire. Her crew were rescued. She was on a voyage from Glasgow, Renfrewshire to Stettin.
Augusta	Russia	The ship ran aground off Saltholm, Denmark. She was on a voyage from Kronstadt to Hull, Yorkshire, United Kingdom. She was refloated and resumed her voyage.
Bounty Hall	United Kingdom	The ship was wrecked on a reef in the South China Sea. Her crew were rescued. She was on a voyage from Hong Kong to Bombay, India.
Codrington	United Kingdom	The brig was driven ashore in the Bay of Maitos, Ottoman Empire. She had been refloated by 14 September.
John Bell	United Kingdom	The schooner was wrecked on Glover's Reef. All on board were rescued. She was on a voyage from New Orleans, Louisiana, United States to Belize City, British Honduras.
Maid of Erin	United Kingdom	The ship was driven ashore and severely damaged at Green Cove, in the Beaver River, British North America.
Messenger	(United Kingdom of Great Britain and Ireland) British North America	The barque capsized off Cape Sable Island, Nova Scotia with the loss of six of her crew. Survivors were rescued by Canton (United States). Messenger was on a voyage from Saint John, New Brunswick to Liverpool, Lancashire. She was towed in to Lobster bay in a capsized condition and was burnt.
Sarah	United Kingdom	The ship was wrecked on Bear Island, in the Gut of Canso. She was on a voyage from Pictou, Nova Scotia to Dublin and Liverpool.
Scandinavia	Netherlands	The ship was driven ashore at Kattendijke, Zeeland.
Toronto	United Kingdom	The barque was driven ashore at Barber's Point, in the Dardanelles. She had been refloated by 14 September.

== 9 September ==
List of shipwrecks: 9 September 1850
Ship	State	Description
Albert	(United Kingdom of Great Britain and Ireland) New South Wales	The ship departed from Circular Head for Melbourne. No further trace, presumed foundered with the loss of all hands.
Ammina	Kingdom of Hanover	The ship was driven ashore and severely damaged on Spiekeroog. Her crew were rescued. She was on a voyage from Carolinensiel to Hull, Yorkshire, United Kingdom.
Mary Jane	United Kingdom	The barque was abandoned in the Atlantic Ocean (44°57′N 50°21′W). Her crew were rescued by the brig Viola United Kingdom. Mary Jane was on a voyage from Quebec City, Province of Canada to London.
Rosalinda	United Kingdom	The ship capsized in the Grand Banks of Newfoundland with the loss of sixteen of her 24 crew. Survivors were rescued by a French vessel. She was on a voyage from Quebec City, Province of Canada, British North America to Liverpool, Lancashire.
Sir Robert Peel	United Kingdom	The ship foundered in the Atlantic Ocean 200 nautical miles (370 km) off São Vicente, Cape Verde Islands. Her crew were rescued. She was on a voyage from Liverpool to Bombay, India.
Strathmore	United Kingdom	The brig capsized in the Atlantic Ocean with the loss of five of her crew. Survivors were rescued by the brig San Pedro (Spain). Strathmore was on a voyage from Quebec City to Pwllheli, Caernarfonshire.
Venture	United Kingdom	The brig capsized and was abandoned in the Atlantic Oceanr. Her crew were rescued by the brigantine Gertrude (United Kingdom). Venture was on a voyage from Sunderland, County Durham to Quebec City.
Viceroy	United Kingdom	The ship was wrecked on Saint Paul Island, Nova Scotia, British North America. All on board were rescued.

== 10 September ==
List of shipwrecks: 10 September 1850
Ship	State	Description
Agnes	United Kingdom	The ship was wrecked with some loss of life.
Conquest	United Kingdom	The schooner was driven ashore at Chioggia, Kingdom of Lombardy–Venetia. She was on a voyage from Newcastle upon Tyne, Northumberland to Venice, Kingdom of Lombardy–Venetia. She was refloated and taken in to Venice.
Elizabeth	Grand Duchy of Tuscany	The ship was driven ashore and wrecked on Fire Island, in the Sacramento River with much loss of life.
Fortuna	United Kingdom	The ship was driven ashore at Ness Point, Suffolk. She was refloated the next day and proceeded on her voyage.
Lady Champney	United Kingdom	The ship was driven ashore between the "Rock Lighthouse" and the "Red Noses", Lancashire. She was on a voyage from Liverpool, Lancashire to Dublin.
Promise	United Kingdom	The barque ran aground on the Coal Rock, off Anglesey. She was later refloated but consequently sank. She was on a voyage from Liverpool, Lancashire to Sydney, New South Wales.

== 11 September ==
List of shipwrecks: 11 September 1850
Ship	State	Description
Charlotte	United Kingdom	The brigantine was abandoned in the Atlantic Ocean. All on board were rescued by Liverpool (United Kingdom). Charlotte was on a voyage from Prince Edward Island, British North America to Liverpool, Lancashire.
Helene	Bremen	The full-rigged ship was driven ashore near New York. She was on a voyage from New York to Bremen. She was later refloated and put back to Bremen in a leaky condition.
Louisa	United Kingdom	The brigantine was abandoned in the Atlantic Ocean. Her crew were rescued by the brigantine Charlotte (United Kingdom). Louisa was on a voyage from Prince Edward Island to Liverpool.

== 12 September ==
List of shipwrecks: 12 September 1850
Ship	State	Description
Elizabeth Smith	United Kingdom	The brig was abandoned in the Atlantic Ocean. Her ten crew were rescued. She was on a voyage from Quebec City, Province of Canada, British North America to Sunderland, County Durham.
Larpent	United Kingdom	The ship struck a sunken rock off Botel Tobago, off the coast of Formosa. She was abandoned the next day. Her 31 crew took to the boats and landed at "Mat-faer", Formosa. Twenty were subsequently murdered by the local inhabitants, three were taken prisoner and eight were reported missing. Larpent was on a voyage from Liverpool, Lancashire to Shanghai, China.
Tom Bowling	United Kingdom	The ship foundered in the Atlantic Ocean (45°00′N 38°32′W). Her crew were rescued by Industry (United Kingdom). Tom Bowling was on a voyage from Belfast, County Antrim to Quebec City.

== 13 September ==
List of shipwrecks: 13 September 1850
Ship	State	Description
Claudia	United Kingdom	The smack was driven ashore at Churchtown, County Wexford. She was on a voyage from Caernarfon to Cork. She was refloated the next day and taken in to Waterford.
St. Croix	(United Kingdom of Great Britain and Ireland) Jersey	The smack was driven ashore east of Shoreham-by-Sea, Sussex. She was refloated the next day and taken in to Shoreham-by-Sea.

== 14 September ==
List of shipwrecks: 14 September 1850
Ship	State	Description
Corsair	United Kingdom	The ship was wrecked at Petit-Métis, Province of Canada, British North America. She was on a voyage from Gloucester to Quebec City, Province of Canada.
San Giovanni	Flag unknown	The ship sprang a leak and foundered in the Mediterranean Sea 25 nautical miles (46 km) east of Pantellaria, Kingdom of the Two Sicilies. Her crew were rescued. She was on a voyage from Odesa to Falmouth, Cornwall or Queenstown, County Cork, United Kingdom.

== 15 September ==
List of shipwrecks: 15 September 1850
Ship	State	Description
Adelaide	United Kingdom	The ship was abandoned off Cape Sable Island, Nova Scotia British North America. Her crew were rescued. She was on a voyage from Cardiff, Glamorgan to Baltimore, Maryland, United States.
Agnes	United Kingdom	The ship was abandoned in the Atlantic Ocean. Her crew were rescued by Princess Royal (United Kingdom). Agnes was on a voyage from Quebec City, Province of Canada, British North America to Dublin.
Polka	United Kingdom	On a run from Saint Malo to Jersey, Channel Islands, as a replacement ship, the paddle steamer sprang a leak and began to sink near the Minquiers, off Jersey. All 49 passengers and crew took to the lifeboats and were rescued.

== 16 September ==
List of shipwrecks: 16 September 1850
Ship	State	Description
Amphion	United Kingdom	The schooner caught fire and was scuttled at Umeå, Sweden.
Cockburn	United Kingdom	The barque was driven ashore and wrecked in Table Bay. Her crew were rescued. She was on a voyage from Liverpool, Lancashire to Cape Town, Cape Colony.
Duck	United Kingdom	The schooner was driven ashore at Smyrna, Ottoman Empire.
Eden	United Kingdom	The brig ran aground on the West Barrow Sand, in the North Sea off the coast of Essex. She was on a voyage from London to Newcastle upon Tyne, Northumberland. She was refloated and taken in to Sheerness, Kent.
Mauritius	(France) Mauritius	The ship was driven ashore and wrecked in Table Bay. Her crew were rescued.
Saxon	United Kingdom	The ship caught fire in the Indian Ocean. She was abandoned on 18 September. Her crew were rescued on 24 September by Essex (United Kingdom). Saxon was on a voyage from London to Aden.

== 17 September ==
List of shipwrecks: 17 September 1850
Ship	State	Description
Albion	United Kingdom	The ship was severely damaged by fire at Rye, Sussex. She was on a voyage from Rye to Leith, Lothian.
Angara (Ангара)	Imperial Russian Navy	The transport ship damaged her rudder and was beached on the eastern shore of the Kamchatka Peninsula, about 1.1 nautical miles (2 km) north of Gavryushkin Kamen. Her crew survived. She was on a voyage from Okhotsk to Petropavlovsk.
Ark	United Kingdom	The ship was driven ashore at Redcar, Yorkshire. She was on a voyage from South Shields, County Durham to London. She was refloated and resumed her voyage.
Superb	United Kingdom	The steamer, running from Saint Malo to Jersey, Channel Islands, with 60 passengers, including survivors from Polka (United Kingdom), on approaching the Minquiers reef went to inspect where Polka had sunk, whereupon Superb struck a rock and sank with the loss of some 20 lives. Survivors were rescued by the steamship Collier (United Kingdom).

== 18 September ==
List of shipwrecks: 18 September 1850
Ship	State	Description
Claret	France	The ship was driven ashore near Brook, Isle of Wight, United Kingdom. She was on a voyage from Bordeaux, Gironde to London, United Kingdom. She was refloated and resumed her voyage.
Good Intent	United Kingdom	The ship ran aground on the Red Sand off the north Kent coast. She was refloated and put in to Whitstable, Kent in a leaky condition.
Johan S. de Wolff	United Kingdom	The ship ran aground on the Burbo Bank, in Liverpool Bay. She was on a voyage from Liverpool, Lancashire to Saint John, New Brunswick, British North America. She was refloated and resumed her voyage.
Memnon	Belgium	The ship ran aground and was wrecked off Île Sainte-Marie, Merina Kingdom.

== 19 September ==
List of shipwrecks: 19 September 1850
Ship	State	Description
Alice	United Kingdom	The brig was driven ashore near the mouth of the Little River, Maine, United States. She was refloated on 21 September and towed in to Eastport, Maine.
Anne	United Kingdom	The ship foundered in the Atlantic Ocean 35 nautical miles (65 km) north of Cape St. Vincent, Portugal. Her crew were rescued by Prince of Saxe Coburg (United Kingdom. Anne was on a voyage from Glasgow, Renfrewshire to Genoa, Kingdom of Sardinia.
Heather Bell	United Kingdom	The ship was wrecked on Anticosti Island, Nova Scotia, British North America. All on board were rescued. She was on a voyage from Limerick to New York, United States. She was refloated in May 1851 and was being taken in to Quebec City, Province of Canada, British North America when she capsized in the Bay of Seven Islands on 17 May. Her crew were rescued.

== 20 September ==
List of shipwrecks: 20 September 1850
Ship	State	Description
Betsey	United Kingdom	The smack sank off Newport, Monmouthshire. She was on a voyage from Gloucester to Newport.
Boston	United Kingdom	The schooner foundered off the west coast of the United States with the loss of all on board.
Blossom	Russia	The ship ran aground on the Vogelsand, in the North Sea. She was on a voyage from Hamburg to Leith, Lothian, United Kingdom. She was refloated and resumed her voyage.
Samuels	United Kingdom	The schooner foundered 12 nautical miles (22 km) south west of the Isle of Glass Lighthouse. Her crew were rescued by the schooner Oliver Branch (United Kingdom). Samuels was on a voyage from Liverpool, Lancashire to Kronstadt, Russia.

== 21 September ==
List of shipwrecks: 21 September 1850
Ship	State	Description
Ann	United Kingdom	The sloop ran aground and sank on the Rose Sand, in the North Sea off the coast of Lincolnshire. She was on a voyage from Beccles, Suffolk to Goole, Yorkshire. She was refloated and put in to Grimsby in a leaky condition.
Brothers	United Kingdom	The sloop foundered. Her crew were rescued. She was on a voyage from "Ballow" to Cardiff, Glamorgan.
Charles	United Kingdom	The schooner foundered in the Sound of Skerries, off the coast of Anglesey with the loss of all on board. She was on a voyage from Runcorn, Cheshire to Dublin.
Jenny Lind	United Kingdom	The ship was wrecked on the Cairns Reef, 400 nautical miles (740 km) north of Moreton Bay. Her crew were rescued. She was on a voyage from Melbourne, New South Wales to Singapore.

== 22 September ==
List of shipwrecks: 22 September 1850
Ship	State	Description
Margaretha	Bremen	The ship departed from London for Sunderland, County Durham, United Kingdom. No further trace, presumed foundered with the loss of all hands.
Sir Allan McNab	United Kingdom	The schooner was driven ashore near Carrickfergus, County Antrim. She was on a voyage from Maryport, Cumberland to Dublin.

== 23 September ==
List of shipwrecks: 23 September 1850
Ship	State	Description
Belgique	Belgium	The ship ran aground on the Saftingen Bank, in the Scheldt. she was on a voyage from Rio de Janeiro, Brazil to Antwerp. She was refloated.
Norfolk	United Kingdom	The ship struck a rock in Algoa Bay and was consequently beached on Bird Island, Cape Colony. She subsequently became a wreck.
Nathalie	France	The ship was driven ashore in the Orne. She was on a voyage from Caen, Calvados to Liverpool, Lancashire, United Kingdom.
Rawlins	United Kingdom	The ship capsized in the Atlantic Ocean and was abandoned. Her crew were rescued by Sovereign (United Kingdom). Rawlins was on a voyage from Portsmouth, Hampshire to Quebec City, Province of Canada, British North America.
Sarah	United Kingdom	The ship ran aground and was damaged on the Swinebottoms, in the Baltic Sea. She was on a voyage from London to Riga, Russia. She was refloated and taken in to Helsingør, Denmark for repairs.

== 24 September ==
List of shipwrecks: 24 September 1850
Ship	State	Description
Eliza	United Kingdom	The ship ran aground on the Newcombe Sand, in the North Sea off the coast of Suffolk. She was on a voyage from Newcastle upon Tyne, Northumberland to Cartagena, Spain.
Harpley	United Kingdom	A message in a bottle from a passenger on board the ship washed up at Kingsbridge, Devon. It stated that the ship had foundered on this date and that all on board were on a raft. Doubts were expressed that this was a hoax, although the notes' author was confirmed to have been on board and his signature was confirmed as genuine. The full-rigged ship Harpley was on a voyage from Plymouth, Devon to Australia. Subsequently proved to have been a hoax.
HMS Thetis	United Kingdom	The Thetis-class frigate ran aground at Redden Point, Devon. She was refloated and towed in to Plymouth Sound by HMS Confiance (Royal Navy).

== 25 September ==
List of shipwrecks: 25 September 1850
Ship	State	Description
Leocadia	France	The ship was wrecked on a reef off Boa Vista, Cape Verde Islands. Her crew were rescued. She was on a voyage from Bordeaux, Gironde to Mauritius.

== 26 September ==
List of shipwrecks: 26 September 1850
Ship	State	Description
Francke Catharina	Kingdom of Hanover	The ship departed from Leer for London, United Kingdom. No further trace, presumed foundered with the loss of all hands.
Juno	United Kingdom	The ship ran aground on the Barnard Sand, in the North Sea off the coast of Suffolk. She was on a voyage from South Shields, County Durham to Algiers, Algeria. She was refloated and taken in to Lowestoft, Suffolk.
Lord Exmouth	United Kingdom	The ship ran aground on the Banjaard Sand, in the North Sea off the Dutch coast. She was on a voyage from Liverpool, Lancashire to Rotterdam, South Holland, Netherlands. She was refloated and put in to Brouwershaven, Zeeland, Netherlands in a leaky condition.
Tinker	United Kingdom	The ship ran aground on the Plough Seat, off the Farne Islands, Northumberland. She was on a voyage from Newcastle upon Tyne, Northumberland to Perth. She was refloated and towed in to Eyemouth, Berwickshire in a leaky condition.

== 27 September ==
List of shipwrecks: 27 September 1850
Ship	State	Description
Arrow	United Kingdom	The schooner sprang a leak and was beached at Cromarty. She was on a voyage from Barrow-in-Furness, Lancashire to Newcastle upon Tyne, Northumberland.
Four Brothers	United Kingdom	The ship was driven ashore. She was refloated and put in to Ramsgate, Kent in a leaky condition.
Knaresborough Castle	United Kingdom	The ship ran aground on the Holm Sand, in the North Sea off the coast of Suffolk. She was refloated and taken in to Lowestoft in a sinking condition.
Mercur	Bremen	The ship departed from Cardiff, Glamorgan, United Kingdom. No further trace, presumed foundered with the loss of all hands.

== 28 September ==
List of shipwrecks: 28 September 1850
Ship	State	Description
Belle	United Kingdom	The ship was driven ashore at the Landguard Fort, Harwich, Essex. She was on a voyage from Wismar to London. She was refloated.
Gratitude	United Kingdom	The ship sprang a leak whilst of a voyage from Glasgow, Renfrewshire to Dublin. She put in to Greenock, Renfrewshire in a waterlogged condition.
Heroine	(United Kingdom of Great Britain and Ireland) New South Wales	The schooner was wrecked in the Richmond River with the loss of all hands.
Jeune Auguste	France	The ship ran aground on the Noordvaarder Sand, in the North Sea off the coast of the Netherlands. All on board were rescued. She was on a voyage from Rouen, Seine-Inférieure to Hamburg.
Lucy Ann	(United Kingdom of Great Britain and Ireland) New South Wales	The schooner was wrecked in the Richmond River with the loss of all but one of her crew.

== 29 September ==
List of shipwrecks: 29 September 1850
Ship	State	Description
Active	United Kingdom	The ship was beached at Cemlyn, Anglesey. She was on a voyage from Dublin to Liverpool, Lancashire.
British Tar	United Kingdom	The ship ran aground at Port Natal, Cape Colony. She was consequently condemnecd.
Catharina Sophia	Norway	The ship was wrecked at Böda, Sweden. Her crew were rescued.
Jessie Stewart	United Kingdom	The ship was driven ashore at Whitehaven, Cumberland. She was on a voyage from Newry, County Antrim to Whitehaven.
Thomas Ainsworth	United Kingdom	The ship was driven ashore and wrecked on Eierland, North Holland, Netherlands. Her crew were rescued. She was on a voyage from Newcastle upon Tyne, Northumberland to Zwolle, Overijssel, Netherlands.

== 30 September ==
List of shipwrecks: 30 September 1850
Ship	State	Description
Albert	France	The ship was in collision with another vessel and was beached at Saltburn, Yorkshire, United Kingdom with the loss of her captain. She subsequently became a wreck.
Eleanor Grace	United Kingdom	The ship was severely damaged whilst discharging ballast at Harwich, Essex.
Grace and James	United Kingdom	The ship was driven ashore 30 nautical miles (56 km) from Bayonne, Basses-Pyrénées. She was on a voyage from A Coruña, Spain to Bayonne.
Hercules	United Kingdom	The ship ran aground on the Holm Sand, in the North Sea off the coast of Suffolk. She was refloated and taken in to Lowestoft, Suffolk.
Janet	United Kingdom	The ship foundered off Dimlington, Yorkshire. Her crew were rescued. She was on a voyage from Newcastle upon Tyne, Northumberland to Boulogne, Pas-de-Calais, France.
Joseph	United Kingdom	The ship ran aground on the Barber Sand, in the North Sea off the coast of Norfolk. She was on a voyage from Inverness to London. She was refloated.
Lord Keone	United Kingdom	The ship sprang a leak and foundered 60 nautical miles (110 km) north of the Isles of Scilly. Her crew were rescued by Eliza Goddard (United Kingdom). Lord Keone was on a voyage from Cork to Truro, Cornwall.
Manchester	United Kingdom	The ship was driven ashore and wrecked at Point Palmyras, India. She was on a voyage from Calcutta, India to London.
Maria	United Kingdom	The schooner was driven ashore in the River Blackwater. She was on a voyage from Cardiff, Glamorgan to Maldon, Essex. She was refloated.
Northwestern	United States	Northwestern Carrying a cargo of salt, the wooden brig sank in 135 feet (41 m) of water in Lake Huron off the coast of Michigan at 45.448083°N 83.69695°W after the steamer Monticello (United States) accidentally rammed her.

== Unknown date ==
List of shipwrecks: Unknown date September 1850
Ship	State	Description
Douglas	United Kingdom	The barque was abandoned in the Atlantic Ocean before 24 September.
Eleonore Aldegonda	Netherlands	The ship was lost in the Baltic Sea. She was on a voyage from Rotterdam, South Holland to Stettin.
Enigheden	Duchy of Holstein	The ship was abandoned in the Atlantic Ocean before 8 September. She was discovered on that date by Prince of Wales (United Kingdom) and was scuttled.
Fanny and Jane	United Kingdom	The ship was wrecked between Ceuta and Tetuan, Morocco before 15 September. She was on a voyage from Livorno, Grand Duchy of Tuscany to Queenstown, County Cork.
Haick	Austrian Empire	The barque was driven ashore 20 nautical miles (37 km) from Brindisi, Kingdom of the Two Sicilies before 20 September. She was on a voyage from Troon, Ayrshire, United Kingdom to Trieste. She was consequently condemned.
Hendrika Johanna	Netherlands	The ship was driven ashore near Marstrand, Sweden before 13 September. She was on a voyage from Liepāja, Russian Empire to Schiedam, South Holland. She was consequently condemned.
Infanta	France	The ship sprang a leak and was abandoned in the English Channel 35 nautical miles (65 km) north west of Guernsey, Channel Islands. Her crew were rescued by Pauline (France). Infanta was on a voyage from Marseille, Bouches-du-Rhône to an English port.
Johanna	Sweden	The brig was abandoned in the Atlantic Ocean before 12 September.
John Wesley	United Kingdom	The ship ran aground near Gallipoli, Ottoman Empire before 28 September. She was refloated.
Julia	United States	The steamboat sank in the Mississippi River.
Lydia	United Kingdom	The ship was lost at sea. All on board were rescued by Colony (United Kingdom).
Mercurius	United Kingdom	The ship was driven ashore at Montevideo, Uruguay.
Merino	Spain	The brig was wrecked on the Woman Key before 27 September. She was on a voyage from Trinidad to Barcelona.
Montemayor	Spain	The brig caught fire and was abandoned before 21 September. her crew survived. She was on a voyage from Manila, Spanish East Indies to Hong Kong.
Netta	United Kingdom	The ship was stranded in the White Sea before 5 September.
Parana	France	The schooner ran aground between "Puerto Carera" and the Isla de Flores, Uruguay. She was on a voyage from Montevideo to the Rio Grande. She was refloated and resumed her voyage.
Peter Miller	United States	The steamboat exploded at Cincinnati, Ohio with the loss of six lives.
Princess Victoria	United Kingdom	The ship was driven ashore at Cape Palos, Spain. She was on a voyage from Alexandria, Egypt to Ayr. She was refloated and resumed her voyage in a leaky condition, arriving at Ayr on 23 September.
Queen	(United Kingdom of Great Britain and Ireland) New Zealand	The schooner was wrecked in Poverty Bay. All hands were saved.
Rosaling	(United Kingdom of Great Britain and Ireland) New South Wales	The cutter capsized 4 nautical miles (7.4 km) south east of "Jerrigong". Her crew were rescued.
Shanunga	United Kingdom	The full-rigged ship ran aground in the San Bernardino Strait. She was later refloated and take in to Manila, Spanish East Indies for repairs.
Sophie	Greece	The full-rigged ship sank at Kastellorizo.
Sovereign	United Kingdom	The ship was abandoned in the Atlantic Ocean before 4 September. She was taken in tow by Mary Caroline (France).
Tarquin	United Kingdom	The full-rigged ship was abandoned in the Atlantic Ocean before 17 September.
Victory	United Kingdom	The barque was abandoned in the Atlantic Ocean before 20 September. She was on a voyage from Quebec City to Bristol, Gloucestershire. Victory was sighted on 31 October at 42°28′N 50°55′W).
