= List of shipwrecks in December 1859 =

The list of shipwrecks in December 1859 includes ships sunk, foundered, grounded, or otherwise lost during December 1859.

== 1 December ==
List of shipwrecks: 1 December 1859
Ship	State	Description
Berhampore	United Kingdom	The ship departed from Bombay, India for London. No further trace, presumed foundered with the loss of all hands.
Chieftain	United Kingdom	The full-rigged ship was wrecked on the Pratas Shoals, in the South China Sea. Her crew survived. She was on a voyage from Shanghai, China to London.
Expert	United Kingdom	The ketch was driven ashore, capsized and was wrecked at Wells-next-the-Sea, Norfolk with the loss of all hands. She was on a voyage from Lossiemouth, Moray to Ipswich, Suffolk.
Josephicus	(United Kingdom of Great Britain and Ireland) Jersey	The schooner was driven ashore at Trouville-sur-Mer, Calvados, France. She was on a voyage from Newcastle upon Tyne, Northumberland to Trouville-sur-Mer. She was refloated and towed in to port. Subsequently taken to Havre de Grâce, Seine-Inférieure, France for repairs.
Shaver	United Kingdom	The schooner ran aground on the Maplin Sand, in the North Sea off the coast of Essex. She was abandoned on 4 December. Her crew were rescued. She was on a voyage from Methil, Fife to London.
Sutton Bridge	United Kingdom	The brig was driven ashore and wrecked on the east coast of Bornholm, Denmark with the loss of three of her eight crew. She was on a voyage from Memel, Prussia to Wisbech, Cambridgeshire.
Teaser	United Kingdom	The ketch collided with Susan Vittery (United Kingdom) and sank 15 nautical miles (28 km) south by east of the Eddystone Lighthouse. Her crew were rescued. She was on a voyage from Waterford to Portsmouth, Hampshire.
Vesta	United Kingdom	The schooner sank in Pegwell Bay. Her crew were rescued by the Ramsgate Lifeboat. She was on a voyage from Hartlepool, County Durham to Ramsgate, Kent.
William Stetson	United States	The ship was destroyed by fire in the Atlantic Ocean (43°30′N 33°50′W). Her 24 crew were rescued by W. V. Moses (United States). William Stetson was on a voyage from New Orleans, Louisiana to Liverpool, Lancashire, United Kingdom.
Zealante	Flag unknown	The ship sprang a leak and sank 12 nautical miles (22 km) west of the mouth of the Guadiana. Her crew survived.

== 2 December ==
List of shipwrecks: 2 December 1859
Ship	State	Description
Brothock	United Kingdom	The schooner was wrecked at Sandhammaren, Sweden. Her crew were rescued. She was on a voyage from Riga, Russia to Dundee, Forfarshire.
Champion	United Kingdom	The brig was driven ashore and severely damaged in Loch Don. She was on a voyage from Newcastle upon Tyne, Northumberland to Dublin.
Countess	United Kingdom	The schooner was driven ashore and sank at Aldeburgh, Suffolk. Her five crew were rescued. She was on a voyage from Bo'ness, Lothian to Ipswich, Suffolk.
Emelyn, or Emily	United Kingdom	The schooner was driven ashore at Le Tréport, Seine-Inférieure, France.
Eulalie	France	The schooner was driven ashore at Gravelines, Nord. She was refloated.
Marchioness	United Kingdom	The ship foundered off Ardnamurchan Point, Argyllshire. Her crew were rescued.
Orient	United Kingdom	The steamship ran aground at Stettin. She was on a voyage from Leith, Lothian to Stettin .
San Michell	Flag unknown	The ship ran aground and was severely damaged at Dover, Kent, United Kingdom. She was on a voyage from Terra Nova, Newfoundland, British North America to Newcastle upon Tyne, Northumberland.
Teazer	United Kingdom	The ship was in collision with Susan Vittery (United Kingdom) and sank 15 nautical miles (28 km) south east by east of the Eddystone Lighthouse. Her crew were rescued. She was on a voyage from Waterford to Portsmouth, Hampshire.

== 3 December ==
List of shipwrecks: 3 December 1859
Ship	State	Description
Bell	United Kingdom	The brig was severely damaged by fire at Liverpool, Lancashire.
Gomelza	United States	The ship sank in Hood's Canal. She was later refloated and beached at San Francisco, California. She was declared a total loss.
Hope	United Kingdom	The ship ran aground on the Spaniard Sand, in the North Sea off the coast of Kent. She was on a voyage from Antwerp, Belgium to London. She was refloated and assisted in to Whitstable, Kent.
John Bull	United Kingdom	The brig collided with the schooner Duna (Russia) and sank in the Baltic Sea. Her crew were rescued. She was on a voyage from Riga, Russia to London.
Kindrockat	United Kingdom	The ship was wrecked at Coringa, India. There were nine survivors.
Margaret	United Kingdom	The ship departed from Sunderland, County Durham for Lossiemouth Moray. No further trace, presumed foundered in the North Sea with the loss of all hands.
Moses Davenport	United Kingdom	The ship ran aground in the Hooghly River. She was on a voyage from Liverpool to Calcutta, India. She was refloated and taken in to Calcutta in a severely leaky condition.
Scott	United Kingdom	The schooner departed from Berwick upon Tweed, Northumberland for London. No further trace, presumed foundered with the loss of all hands.

== 4 December ==
List of shipwrecks: 4 December 1859
Ship	State	Description
Abel	(United Kingdom of Great Britain and Ireland) Jersey	The ship was driven ashore and wrecked at Elizabeth Castle, Saint Helier. She was on a voyage from Danzig to Saint Helier.
Arthur Wellesley	United Kingdom	The ship was wrecked at the entrance to the Bosphorus with the loss of all but one of her sixteen crew. She was on a voyage from Balchik, Ottoman Empire to an English port.
Barbara	United Kingdom	The ship ran aground on the Salthouse Bank, in the Irish Sea off the coast of Lancashire and was wrecked. Her crew were rescued.
Eagle	United Kingdom	The barque was driven ashore at Helsingør, Denmark. She was on a voyage from Sundsvall, Sweden to London. She was refloated and resumed her voyage but ran aground at "Hornbeck", Denmark.
Elizabeth Ellen	United States	The ship was driven ashore 4 nautical miles (7.4 km) north of the Hillsborough Inlet. She was on a voyage from New Orleans, Louisiana to Bremen.
Emily	United Kingdom	The schooner was driven ashore at Le Tréport, Seine-Inférieure, France.
Eulalie	France	The schooner was driven ashore at Gravelines, Nord. She was refloated.
Falken	Norway	The barque was driven ashore on Mallorca, Spain. She was on a voyage from Alexandria, Egypt to Cork or Falmouth, Cornwall, United Kingdom.
Gem	United Kingdom	The brig was driven ashore at Redcar, Yorkshire. She was on a voyage from London to Hartlepool, County Durham. She was refloated and resumed her voyage.
Giovanni Leopoldo	Austrian Empire	The brig was driven ashore at Punta Mala, Spain. She was refloated.
Globe	United Kingdom	The barquen was driven ashore at "Saguarenia", near Rio de Janeiro, Brazil. She was on a voyage from Liverpool, Lancashire to Rio de Janeiro.
Hector	(Russian Empire) Grand Duchy of Finland	The ship ran aground on the Shipwash Sand, in the North Sea off the coast of Suffolk, United Kingdom. She was on a voyage from Pori to Gibraltar. She was refloated and assisted in to Harwich, Essex, United Kingdom.
Henzai	(United Kingdom of Great Britain and Ireland) Burma	The ship was wrecked on the Algusta Reef, in the Indian Ocean. Her crew survived. She was on a voyage from Madras, India to Rangoon.
Industry	United Kingdom	The schooner was driven ashore at Redcar. She was on a voyage from Great Yarmouth, Norfolk to Middlesbrough, Yorkshire. She was refloated.
Jaque Roca	France	The barque was driven ashore near Roquetas, Spain. She was on a voyage from Odesa to Rouen, Seine-Inférieure.
Laura	United Kingdom	The barque was driven ashore at Veracruz, Mexico.
Lovisa	Norway	The schooner ran aground and sank near Egersund.
Marianne	Kingdom of Hanover	The galiot was driven ashore at Redcar. She was on a voyage from Rotterdam, South Holland, Netherlands to Middlesbrough. She was refloated and resumed her voyage.
Mystery	United Kingdom	The steamship ran aground on the Burbo Bank, in Liverpool Bay. She was on a voyage from Whitehaven, Cumberland to Liverpool. She was refloated with assistance from the tug United Kingdom (United Kingdom) and towed in to Liverpool.
Solicitor	United Kingdom	The schooner was driven ashore at Southampton, New York, United States. Her crew were rescued. She was on a voyage from Cephalonia, United States of the Ionian Islands to New York City, United States. Solicitor became a wreck on 17 December.
Tamar	United Kingdom	The smack was abandoned off Hartland Point, Devon. Her crew survived. She was on a voyage from Plymouth, Devon to Newport, Monmouthshire.
Tasmania	United Kingdom	The schooner was beached at "Lochhelsh", Ross-shire. She was on a voyage from Königsberg, Prussia to Dublin. She was a total loss.
Unity	United Kingdom	The ship sank in the River Mersey.

== 5 December ==
List of shipwrecks: 5 December 1859
Ship	State	Description
Braje	Sweden	The schooner was driven ashore at Helsingør, Denmark. She was on a voyage from Hull, Yorkshire, United Kingdom to Norrköping. She was refloated on 13 December and resumed her voyage.
Canton	Sweden	The barque was wrecked near Camber, Sussex, United Kingdom with the loss of fifteen of the seventeen people on board. She was on a voyage from Calcutta, India to London, United Kingdom.
Carmanton	United Kingdom	The schooner was driven ashore at Rye, Sussex. Her crew were rescued. She was on a voyage from Rouen, Seine-Inférieure, France to Gloucester. She was refloated on 9 December and taken in to Rye.
Colzium	United Kingdom	The schooner was driven ashore near Allonby, Cumberland. Her crew were rescued. She was on a voyage from Kingstown, County Dublin to Whitehaven, Cumberland. She was refloated the next day and taken in to Maryport, Cumberland.
Compeer	United Kingdom	The ship was driven ashore in Loch Don. She was on a voyage from Newcastle upon Tyne, Northumberland to Dublin. The wreck was refloated on 25 May 1861 and towed in to Oban, Argyllshire.
Elgin	United Kingdom	The ship was driven ashore between Allonby and Maryport. She was refloated and towed in to Maryport.
Enterprise	United Kingdom	The ship was driven ashore at Middleton, County Durham. She was refloated and taken in to East Hartlepool, County Durham.
Hazard	United Kingdom	The ship was driven ashore between Allonby and Maryport. She was refloated and towed in to Maryport.
Hermann	Stettin	The ship was driven ashore and wrecked at Helsingør, Denmark. She was on a voyage from Kronstadt, Russia to Nairn, United Kingdom.
Johanna	Belgium	The galiot was driven ashore at the Rammekens Castle, Vlissingen, Zeeland, Netherlands. She was on a voyage from the Clyde to Antwerp. She was refloated the next day and take in to Vlissingen in a leaky condition.
Liver	(United Kingdom of Great Britain and Ireland) Jersey	The ship was wrecked on "Crab Island", County Clare. She was on a voyage from Kinvarra, County Galway to an English port.
Margaret and Ann	(United Kingdom of Great Britain and Ireland) Isle of Man	The sloop was driven ashore at Allonby. She was on a voyage from Douglas to Maryport.
Mystery	United Kingdom	The steamship ran aground on the Burbo Bank, in Liverpool Bay. She was on a voyage from Whitehaven, Cumberland to Liverpool, Lancashire. She was refloated with the assistance of a tug.
Nile	United Kingdom	The brig ran aground on the Maplin Sand, in the North Sea off the coast of Essex. She was on a voyage from Riga, Russia to London. She was refloated with the assistance of a smack and assisted in to Harwich in a leaky condition.
Rock	United Kingdom	The ship was driven ashore between Allonby and Maryport.
Shamrock	United Kingdom	The ship driven ashore between Allonby and Maryport.
Undine	United Kingdom	The barque ran aground on Saltholm, Denmark. She was on a voyage from Memel, Prussia to Newcastle upon Tyne, Northumberland. She had been refloated by 7 December.
Ville de Gultres	France	The ship was driven ashore at Middleton. She was refloated and taken in to East Hartlepool.

== 6 December ==
List of shipwrecks: 6 December 1859
Ship	State	Description
Goldkuhl	Sweden	The ship was driven ashore at Helsingør, Denmark. She was on a voyage from Hull, Yorkshire to Norrköping. She was refloated on 14 December and resumed her voyage.
Helen	United Kingdom	The ship was driven ashore on the Drumcliff Spit, County Sligo. She was on a voyage from Odesa to Sligo.
Jane	United Kingdom	The ship ran aground in the River Nith. She was on a voyage from Liverpool, Lancashire to Limerick. She was refloated on 9 December and taken in to "Carnthorn", Dumfriesshire.
Jane and Mary	United Kingdom	The ship was driven ashore and wrecked near Hals, Denmark. She was on a voyage from Nakskov, Denmark to an English port.
Mirabita	Malta	The barque was wrecked at Chale, Isle of Wight, United Kingdom with the loss of twelve of her seventeen crew. She was on a voyage from Marseille, Bouches-du-Rhône, France to London.
Sentinel	United Kingdom	The schooner was driven ashore and wrecked in Chale Bay with the loss of two of her six crew. She was on a voyage from Dungarvan, County Waterford and/or Caernarfon to Sunderland, County Durham.

== 7 December ==
List of shipwrecks: 7 December 1859
Ship	State	Description
Juno	United Kingdom	The ship was driven ashore and wrecked at Southerness, Dumfriesshire.
Sloga	Austrian Empire	The full-rigged ship was wrecked at "Carabournou", Ottoman Empire with the loss of all hands.

== 8 December ==
List of shipwrecks: 8 December 1859
Ship	State	Description
Jane Brown	United Kingdom	The schooner was driven ashore and wrecked in the Bay of Luce. Her crew were rescued. Jane Brown was on a voyage from Liverpool, Lancashire to Ayr. She was refloated on 14 December and taken in to Drumore, Wigtownshire.
Merchant	United Kingdom	The schooner was driven ashore and wrecked in Ballycotton Bay. Her crew were rescued. She was on a voyage from Cardiff, Glamorgan to Kinsale, County Cork.
Trial	United Kingdom	The brig was driven ashore and wrecked in the Bay of Luce. Her crew were rescued. She was on a voyage from Odesa to Belfast, County Antrim. She was refloated on 22 December and taken in to Dromore, County Down.

== 9 December ==
List of shipwrecks: 9 December 1859
Ship	State	Description
Nile	United Kingdom	The brig ran aground on the Cork Sand, in the North Sea off the coast of Essex. She was on a voyage from Riga, Russia to London. She was refloated and assisted in to Harwich, Essex.
Oberon	Sweden	The schooner was driven ashore at Redcar, Yorkshire, United Kingdom. She was on a voyage from Hull, Yorkshire to South Shields, County Durham, United Kingdom. She was refloated and resumed her voyage, but ran aground at South Shields. She was again refloated and taken in to South Shields in a leaky condition.
Waterlily	United Kingdom	The brigantine was driven ashore at Warrenpoint, County Down. Her eight crew were rescued by the Coast Guard. She was on a voyage from Liverpool, Lancashire to Lagos, Africa.

== 10 December ==
List of shipwrecks: 10 December 1859
Ship	State	Description
Flora	United Kingdom	The ship was wrecked on the Anholt Reef, in the Baltic Sea. Her crew were rescued. She was on a voyage from Danzig to Dover, Kent.
Henry Morton	United Kingdom	The brig was wrecked on the Sizewell Bank, in the North Sea off the coast of Suffolk. Her crew were rescued by the Thorpeness Lifeboat. She was on a voyage from Sunderland, County Durham to London.
Rover	United Kingdom	The ship was wrecked on the Anholt Reef. Her crew were rescued. She was on a voyage from Riga, Russia to London. She floated off in January 1860 and was taken in to Helsingør, Denmark.

== 11 December ==
List of shipwrecks: 11 December 1859
Ship	State	Description
Despatch	United Kingdom	The brig was driven ashore at Redcar, Yorkshire. She was refloated and resumed her voyage in a leaky condition.
Florence	United Kingdom	The schooner was driven ashore and wrecked at Port Nolloth, Cape Colony.
Ora	Kingdom of Hanover	The galiot sank off St. Abbs Head, Berwickshire, United Kingdom. Her crew were rescued. She was on a voyage from Aberdeen, United Kingdom to Hamburg.
Perle	Hamburg	The ship ran aground on the Ram Sand, in the Ems and sank. Her crew were rescued. She was on a voyage from Harwich, Essex, United Kingdom to Hamburg.
Rebecca	United Kingdom	The ship ran ashore at Flamborough Head, Yorkshire. She was on a voyage from Boston, Lincolnshire to Leith, Lothian.
Wave	(United Kingdom of Great Britain and Ireland) New South Wales	The schooner was wrecked at Port Albert, Victoria.

== 12 December ==
List of shipwrecks: 12 December 1859
Ship	State	Description
Armand	United States	The ship was abandoned in the Atlantic Ocean. Her crew were rescued by the schooner Voltiguer (Hamburg). Armand was on a voyage from Bristol to Savannah, Georgia.
Sir Henry Parnell	United Kingdom	The ship collided with the quayside and was severely damaged at South Shields, County Durham. She was on a voyage from South Shield to the West Indies.

== 13 December ==
List of shipwrecks: 13 December 1859
Ship	State	Description
Charlotte	(United Kingdom of Great Britain and Ireland) Guernsey	The barque was abandoned in the Atlantic Ocean. Her crew were rescued. She was on a voyage from Rio de Janeiro, Brazil to the Cape Verde Islands.
Gladiator	United Kingdom	The ship ran aground on the Pluckington Bank, in the River Mersey and broke her back. She was on a voyage from Liverpool, Lancashire to Bombay, India. She was refloated on 16 December and taken in to Liverpool.
Glasgow Packet	United Kingdom	The schooner ran ashore and was wrecked in the Pentland Firth. Her crew were rescued.
Nanna	Norway	The galiot was driven ashore and wrecked near North Berwick, Lothian, United Kingdom. Her crew survived. She was on a voyage from Dundee, Forfarshire to Newcastle upon Tyne, Northumberland, United Kingdom.
Robert and Henry	United Kingdom	The brigantine ran aground on the Horse Bank, in the Irish Sea off the coast of Lancashire. Her six crew were rescued by the Lytham Lifeboat. She broke up on 20 December.
Venice	United Kingdom	The ship was destroyed by fire at Faial Island, Azores. She was on a voyage from Liverpool to New York, United States.

== 14 December ==
List of shipwrecks: 14 December 1859
Ship	State	Description
Ætna	United Kingdom	The brig was driven ashore and wrecked at Whitby, Yorkshire. Her crew were rescued by the Whitby Lifeboat.
Anna	Netherlands	The ship was driven ashore and wrecked at Robin Hood's Bay, Yorkshire, United Kingdom. Her crew were rescued. She was on a voyage from Newcastle upon Tyne, Northumberland, United Kingdom to Delfzijl, Groningen. Anna was refloated on 26 December and towed in to Whitby.
Anna Thiarton	Sweden	The schooner was holed by her anchor and sank at Lytham St. Annes, Lancashire, United Kingdom. She was on a voyage from Galaţi, Ottoman Empire to Preston, Lancashire.
Bolivar	United Kingdom	The barque foundered in the Mediterranean Sea off Mallorca, Spain. Her crew were rescued by the brig Adeliza (United Kingdom). Bolivar was on a voyage from Naples, Kingdom of the Two Sicilies to Bremerhaven.
Bona Fide	United Kingdom	The brig foundered. Nine crew were rescued. She was on a voyage from Taganrog, Russia to Falmouth, Cornwall.
Diligence	United Kingdom	The smack collided with the schooner Rover (United Kingdom) and foundered at Harwich, Essex with the loss of a crew member.
Duguesclin	French Navy	The Suffren-class ship of the line ran aground on the Île Longue, Finistère. She was scrapped in situ.
Elizabeth	United Kingdom	The schooner ran aground and was damaged south of Lindisfarne, Northumberland. Her crew were rescued. She was on a voyage from Lossiemouth, Moray to Newcastle upon Tyne, Northumberland. She was refloated on 24 December and subsequently towed in to Berwick upon Tweed.
Empire	United Kingdom	The steamship caught fire off Whitby, Yorkshire. She was consequently beached near Grimsby, Lincolnshire. She was on a voyage from South Shields, County Durham to London. Empire was refloated with the assistance of a tug and taken in to Grimsby for repairs.
Fides	United Kingdom	The brig was wrecked on the coast of Finistère. Nine crew were rescued. She was on a voyage from Taganrog, Russia to Falmouth, Cornwall.
Hope	United Kingdom	The sloop foundered in the English Channel off Calais, France.
Jamaica	United Kingdom	The barque was driven ashore near Seaton Carew, County Durham. Her crew were rescued. She was on a voyage from Gothenburg, Sweden to West Hartlepool, County Durham.
Marion	United Kingdom	The ship ran aground and sank at Margate, Kent.
Sappho	United Kingdom	The brigantine was driven ashore at Constanţa, Ottoman Empire. Her crew were rescued.
William Henry Angus	United Kingdom	The brig ran aground on the Woolpack Sand, in the North Sea off the coast of Norfolk and sank. Her crew were rescued. She was on a voyage from Gothenburg, Sweden to Wisbech, Cambridgeshire. She was refloated on 17 December and taken in to King's Lynn, Norfolk.

== 15 December ==
List of shipwrecks: 15 December 1859
Ship	State	Description
Amazon	United Kingdom	The ship sank in the Mediterranean Sea 50 nautical miles (93 km) south east of Cape Carbonara, Sardinia. She was on a voyage from Licata, Sicily to Newcastle upon Tyne, Northumberland.
Integrity	United Kingdom	The schooner collided with the brig Europa ( (United Kingdom of Great Britain and Ireland) British North America) and foundered. She was on a voyage from Huelva, Spain to Newcastle upon Tyne, Northumberland.
Juan Bautista Arenzano	Kingdom of Sardinia	The ship was wrecked on the Las Playas de Santa Margarita, 30 nautical miles (56 km) north of Mallorca, Spain. She was on a voyage from Newcastle upon Tyne to Genoa.
Rival	(United Kingdom of Great Britain and Ireland) British North America	The schooner was wrecked on "Mount Nabs Island" with the loss of all but two of her crew.
Senator	United States	The ship ran aground on the Vanderbilt Rock, on the coast of Massachusetts. She was on a voyage from Genoa, Kingdom of Sardinia to Boston, Massachusetts. She was refloated and taken in to Boston in a leaky condition.
Whitriggs	United Kingdom	The ship sank in the River Dee. She was on a voyage from Barrow-in-Furness, Lancashire to Saltney, Cheshire.

== 16 December ==
List of shipwrecks: 16 December 1859
Ship	State	Description
Amy	(United Kingdom of Great Britain and Ireland) New South Wales	The cutter was wrecked on the Dotted Reef. Her crew were rescued.
Flora	United Kingdom	The ship was wrecked on the Anholt Reef, in the Baltic Sea. Her crew were rescued. She was on a voyage from Danzig to Dover, Kent.
Glasgow	United Kingdom	The steamship ran aground on the Colonel Bank, off the coast of County Cork. She was on a voyage from the Clyde to New York, United States. She was refloated and resumed her voyage .
Purchase	United Kingdom	The brigantine was abandoned in the Atlantic Ocean. Her thirteen crew were rescued by the barque Carleton (United Kingdom). Purchase was on a voyage from Liverpool, Lancashire to Yarmouth, Nova Scotia, British North America.
Silas Holmes	United States	The full-rigged ship foundered in the Atlantic Ocean with the loss of 32 of the 41 people on board. She had previously ran aground on Gardiner Island Key and been improperly repaired.

== 17 December ==
List of shipwrecks: 17 December 1859
Ship	State	Description
Belford	United Kingdom	The schooner was driven ashore at Robin Hood's Bay, Yorkshire. She was on a voyage from Dundee, Forfarshire to London.
Britannia	United Kingdom	The brig was driven ashore at Robin Hood's Bay. She was refloated and towed in to Whitby, Yorkshire by the tugs Esk and Hilda (both United Kingdom)
Eichmann	Danzig	The ship was driven ashore and wrecked at Hela, Prussia. Her crew were rescued. She was on a voyage from Hull, Yorkshire, United Kingdom to Helsingør, Denmark.
Ellen	United Kingdom	The brig was driven ashore at Robin Hood's Bay. She was refloated the next day and taken in to Whitby.
Hoffnung	Denmark	The ship was because of ice beached on Peter Meyers Sand at Knudedyb, Denmark. She was on a voyage from Newcastle upon Tyne, Northumberland, United Kingdom to Ribe, Denmark.
John Henry Hetts	United Kingdom	The schooner was driven ashore and wrecked at Robin Hood's Bay.
Lord Seaham	United Kingdom	The brig was driven ashore at Robin Hood's Bay. She was refloated and towed in to Whitby by the tugs Esk and Hilda (both United Kingdom).
New Endeavour	United Kingdom	The fishing lugger was driven ashore and wrecked at Calais, France with the loss of all five crew.
Pilgrim	(United Kingdom of Great Britain and Ireland) Isle of Man	The ship foundered in the Irish Sea. Her crew survived. She was on a voyage from Douglas to the River Mersey.
Sea Belle	United States	The full-rigged ship was destroyed by fire at Bristol, Gloucestershire, United Kingdom. Her crew survived.
Sir Henry Yates	United Kingdom	The schooner was driven ashore at Robin Hood's Bay.

== 18 December ==
List of shipwrecks: 18 December 1859
Ship	State	Description
Blenheim	United Kingdom	The steamship ran aground at Belfast, County Antrim. She was on a voyage from Liverpool, Lancashire to Belfast. She was refloated on 20 December and taken in to Belfast.
Erbprinz Frederick August	Prussia	The ship ran aground on the Pennington Spit, in the English Channel off the coast of Hampshire, United Kingdom. She was refloated and taken in to Cowes, Isle of Wight, United Kingdom for repairs.
Hope	United Kingdom	The sloop foundered in the English Channel off Calais, France.
Jeha	Flag unknown	The schooner ran aground at North Shields, County Durham. She was refloated and towed in to North Shields.
Margaret	United States	The ship was wrecked on the Little Bahama Bank. She was on a voyage from New Orleans, Louisiana to the Clyde.
Maria	United Kingdom	The brig ran aground on the Whitburn Rocks, on the coast of County Durham. She was refloated.
Marie Mathilde	Denmark	The ship was driven ashore at the entrance to the Agger Canal. She was on a voyage from Thisted to London, United Kingdom. She was refloated and put back to Thisted.
Mataro	United States	The ship was destroyed by fire at Taboga, Granadine Confederation. She was on a voyage from Liverpool to Taboga and Callao, Peru.
Olive Branch	United Kingdom	The schooner was wrecked on the Filey Brig Rocks. Her seven crew were rescued by the Filey Lifeboat. She was on a voyage from Colchester, Essex to Seaham, County Durham.

== 19 December ==
List of shipwrecks: 19 December 1859
Ship	State	Description
Euphemia	United Kingdom	The ship collided with the steamship Lady Eglington (United Kingdom) and sank in the River Thames. Her crew survived. Euphemia was on a voyage from Montrose, Forfarshire to London. She was refloated on 4 January 1860 and beached at Gravesend, Kent.
Eva	United Kingdom	The barque ran aground on the Shipwash Sand, in the North Sea off the coast of Suffolk. She was on a voyage from Dundee, Forfarshire to Brazil. She was refloated and resumed her voyage.
Flower	United Kingdom	The ship was run into by the steamship Nemesis (United Kingdom) and was beached at New Brighton, Cheshire. She was on a voyage from Liverpool, Lancashire to Castletown, Isle of Man.
Marie	France	The brigantine was wrecked at Arzila, Morocco with the loss of one life.
Parthian	United Kingdom	The ship was severely damaged by fire at Sunderland, County Durham.
Silberweise	Prussia	The schooner was wrecked on the north coast of Corfu, United States of the Ionian Islands with the loss of all but two of her crew. She was on a voyage from a Scottish port to Venice, Kingdom of Lombardy–Venetia.
Thetis	Netherlands	The galiot ran aground at Rotterdam, South Holland.
Twee Vrienden	Netherlands	The schooner sank at Hellevoetsluis, Zeeland.

== 20 December ==
List of shipwrecks: 20 December 1859
Ship	State	Description
Adelphi	United Kingdom	The ship was driven ashore at Bridlington, Yorkshire. Her crew were rescued. She was on a voyage from the River Tyne to London. Adelphi was refloated the next day and taken in to Bridlington.
Amalthea	United Kingdom	The ship was driven ashore and wrecked on Spurn Point, Yorkshire. She was on a voyage from Taganrog, Russia to Hull, Yorkshire.
Favourite	United Kingdom	The schooner collided with the brig Cleopatra (United Kingdom) and was abandoned in the North Sea off Flamborough Head, Yorkshire by all but one of her crew. She was on a voyage from London to Seaham, County Durham. She was towed in to Bridlington, Yorkshire on 25 December by the smacks Excel and Wave (both United Kingdom).
Gamma	United Kingdom	The ship ran aground on the East Knock Sand, in the Thames Estuary. She was on a voyage from Newcastle upon Tyne, Northumberland to London. She was refloated with the assistance of a smack and taken in to Greenwich, Kent.
George D. Dousman	United States	The schooner ran aground on the Holm Sand, in the North Sea off the coast of Suffolk, United Kingdom. She was on a voyage from Constantinople, Ottoman Empire to Leith, Lothian, United Kingdom. She was refloated and taken in to Lowestoft, Suffolk.
Karen Kristine	Denmark	The ship was wrecked at the mouth of the Uggerby Å. Her crew were rescued. She was on a voyage from Leith to Odense.
King Arthur	United Kingdom	The ship departed from São Miguel Island, Azores for Bristol, Gloucestershire. No further trace, presumed foundered with the loss of all hands.
Leopold	United States	The sloop struck a submerged object and sank at Savannah, Georgia.
Panselino	(Kingdom of Italy) United Provinces of Central Italy	The brig was wrecked at "Montallo". She was on a voyage from Messina, Sicily to Livorno.
Peace	United Kingdom	The ship collided with the Dudgeon Lightship ( Trinity House) and foundered in the North Sea. Her crew were rescued by Isabella (United Kingdom). Peace was on a voyage from South Shields, County Durham to London.
Somersetshire	United Kingdom	The sloop foundered 3 nautical miles (5.6 km) south south east of the Mumbles Lighthouse, Glamorgan. Her crew survived. She was on a voyage from Bristol, Gloucestershire to Swansea, Glamorgan.

== 21 December ==
List of shipwrecks: 21 December 1859
Ship	State	Description
Amelia	United Kingdom	The ship was driven ashore at Saltfleet, Lincolnshire. She was on a voyage from Hartlepool, County Durham to London. She was refloated and taken in to Grimsby, Lincolnshire in a severely leaky condition.
Blervie Castle	United Kingdom	The ship foundered in the English Channel with the loss of all 60 people on board. She was on a voyage from London to Adelaide, South Australia.
Cornelia	Kingdom of Hanover	The brig was wrecked off Walney Island, Lancashire, United Kingdom. Her crew survived. She was on a voyage from Brăila, Ottoman Empire to Fleetwood, Lancashire.
Dartagnan	France	The brig was driven ashore at East Dunkirk, Nord. Her crew were rescued. She was on a voyage from Nantes, Loire-Inférieure to Dunkirk.
Eagle	United Kingdom	The ship was wrecked on the Calf of Man, Isle of Man. Her crew were rescued.
Ebenezer	(United Kingdom of Great Britain and Ireland) Isle of Man	The smack was wrecked on Walney Island. Her three crew were rescued.
Emilie	Prussia	The ship was driven ashore and sank at Sandhammaren, Sweden. She was on a voyage from Memel to London.
Emma	United Kingdom	The ship was driven ashore and wrecked 12 nautical miles (22 km) north of Fredrikshavn, Denmark. She was on a voyage from Holbæk, Denmark to Leith, Lothian.
Frau Helena	Kingdom of Hanover	The galiot was wrecked on the Kentish Knock. Her crew were rescued by a smack. She was on a voyage from London to Antwerp, Belgium.
Gezina Hootjes	Netherlands	The ship was sighted off Gibraltar whilst on a voyage from Alexandria, Egypt to Liverpool, Lancashire. No further trace, presumed foundered with the loss of all hands.
Hannah Jane	United States	The brigantine ran aground on the Horse Bank, in the Irish Sea off the coast of Lancashire. Her seven crew were rescued by the Lytham Lifeboat. Hannah Jane was on a voyage from Liverpool to Valencia, Spain. She was refloated and taken in to Lytham St. Annes, Lancashire.
Oak	United Kingdom	The brig ran aground at Bolderāja, Russia. She was refloated and taken in to Riga, Russia.
Penelope	Greece	The ship was driven ashore 7 nautical miles (13 km) from Cagliari, Sardinia. She was on a voyage from Cardiff, Glamorgan, United Kingdom to Odesa.
Providence	United Kingdom	The sloop sank off Saltfleet, Lincolnshire with the loss of one of her three crew.

== 22 December ==
List of shipwrecks: 22 December 1859
Ship	State	Description
Athenais	United Kingdom	The ship was driven ashore at Tranmere, Cheshire. She was on a voyage from Liverpool, Lancashire to Melbourne, Victoria. She was refloated the next day and resumed her voyage.
Christiana	United Kingdom	The brig ran aground on the Maplin Sand, in the North Sea off the coast of Essex. She was refloated with assistance from two smacks and assisted in to Harwich, Essex.
Cora	United Kingdom	The brigantine sank off the Maplin Sand. Her crew were rescued. She was on a voyage from Newcastle upon Tyne, Northumberland to London.
Crocodile	United Kingdom	The schooner foundered off the coast of Pembrokeshire. her crew were rescued. She was on a voyage from Kinsale, County Cork to Bristol, Gloucestershire.
Exeter	United Kingdom	The ship was lost off "Lowlla". Her crew survived. She was on a voyage from New Orleans, Louisiana, United States to London.
Gode Moder	Norway	The galeas was wrecked off the Homborsund Lighthouse, Denmark. Her crew were listed as missing.
Jules	France	The ship was driven ashore at Lowestoft, Suffolk, United Kingdom. She was on a voyage from Gravelines, Nord to Newcastle upon Tyne. She was refloated and towed in to Lowestoft.
Magnolia	France	The ship was driven ashore at "Corumbaco", 20 nautical miles (37 km) south of Porto Seguro, Brazil and was abandoned by her crew. She was on a voyage from Marseille, Bouches-du-Rhône to Rio de Janeiro, Brazil. She was later refloated by two Brazilian Navy steamships and towed in to Bahia, where she arrived on 18 February 1860.
Mary	United Kingdom	The schooner was driven ashore near Waterloo, Lancashire. She was on a voyage from Valentia Island, County Kerry to Liverpool.
Richard By	United Kingdom	The ship was driven ashore on the coast of Lincolnshire. She was refloated and taken in to Grimsby.
Rover	United Kingdom	The schooner sprang a leak and was abandoned in the North Sea 12 nautical miles (22 km) north west half west of Spurn Point, Yorkshire. She was on a voyage from Port Dundas, Renfrewshire to London. She was towed in to Grimsby by the smacks Thomas and Vailant.

== 23 December ==
List of shipwrecks: 23 December 1859
Ship	State	Description
Antje Haverbult	Netherlands	The schooner foundered in the Atlantic Ocean 80 nautical miles (150 km) south south east of Lisbon, Portugal. Her crew were rescued by the brig Jadestro ( Austrian Empire). Antje Haverbult was on a voyage from Newport, Monmouthshire, United Kingdom to Alicante, Spain.
Brevig	Norway	The schooner was driven ashore and wrecked at Ørum, Denmark. Her crew were rescued. She was on a voyage from Lowestoft, Suffolk, United Kingdom to Porsgrund.
Heatherbell	United Kingdom	The smack was driven ashore and wrecked on the Isle of Arran, Inner Hebrides. She was on a voyage from Tiree, Inner Hebrides to Glasgow, Renfrewshire.
Isabella Kerr	United Kingdom	The barque departed from Demerara, British Guiana for Liverpool, Lancashire. No further trace, presumed foundered with the loss of all hands.
Lyra, and Sweetheart	United Kingdom	The schooner Sweetheart collided with the paddle steamer Lyra off the Mull of Galloway, Argyllshire and sank with the loss of all four crew. She was on a voyage from Maryport, Cumberland to Belfast, County Antrim. Lyra was on a voyage from Belfast to Fleetwood, Lancashire. She was severely damaged and made for the coast of Wigtownshire. Her 60 passengers were taken off by Patience (United Kingdom), which took Lyra in tow. The tow was later transferred to Shamrock and Lyra was taken in to Greenock, Renfrewshire.
Niord	Denmark	The schooner was driven ashore on the coast of Jutland. She was on a voyage from Korsør to an English port. She was refloated and taken in to Fredrikshavn in a leaky condition.
Polka	United Kingdom	The ship was driven ashore at Passage West, County Cork. She was on a voyage from Sulina, Ottoman Empire to Queenstown, County Cork. She was refloated the next day.
Solidor	France	The brig was wrecked at "Monte Kolo" with the loss of fourteen lives.

== 24 December ==
List of shipwrecks: 24 December 1859
Ship	State	Description
Amelia	(United Kingdom of Great Britain and Ireland) Isle of Man	The smack was wrecked near Castletown. Her crew were rescued. She was on a voyage from Whitehaven, Cumberland to Castletown.
Countess of Cawdor	United Kingdom	The brig was driven ashore at Newton, Northumberland with the loss of all hands. She was on a voyage from Burntisland, Fife to Sunderland, County Durham. She broke up on 26 December.
Darnhall	United Kingdom	The schooner was wrecked on a reef north east of Islandmagee, County Antrim with the loss of all hands.
Eliza Jenkins	United Kingdom	The ship was driven ashore on the Welsh coast. She was on a voyage from Marseille, Bouches-du-Rhône, France to Donegal. She was refloated and taken in to Holyhead, Anglesey.
Flying Foam	United Kingdom	The ship was wrecked at Madeira with the loss of fifteen of her 21 crew. She was on a voyage from Cardiff, Glamorgan to China.
Jane	United Kingdom	The brig driven ashore near Ballywalter, County Antrim. She was on a voyage from Maryport, Cumberland to Belfast, County Antrim. She had become a wreck by 30 December.
Nanskow	United Kingdom	The smack struck the North Rock and was damaged. She was on a voyage from Cardiff to Belfast. She was refloated and towed in to Belfast in a severely leaky condition.
Rover	United States	The schooner collided with Flora (United States) and sank in Chesapeake Bay. She was on a voyage from Baltimore, Maryland to Nassau, Bahamas. Rover was later refloated and taken in to Baltimore, Maryland.
Swift	United Kingdom	The ship was driven ashore at Fife Ness, Fife. She was on a voyage from Peterhead, Aberdeenshire to Leith, Lothian. She had broken up by 26 December.
Tinamara	United Kingdom	The barque was destroyed by fire off Bo'ness, Fife. Her crew survived. She was on a voyage from Bo'ness to London.

== 25 December ==
List of shipwrecks: 25 December 1859
Ship	State	Description
Cottager	United Kingdom	The brigantine collided with the schooner John Evans (United Kingdom) and was abandoned off Maughold Head, Isle of Man. She was subsequently towed in to Ramsey, Isle of Man.
Esther and Mary	United Kingdom	The ship collided with the steamship Robert Burns (United Kingdom) in the Queen's Channel and was abandoned. Her crew were rescued by Robert Burns. Esther and Mary was on a voyage from Newport, Monmouthshire to Liverpool, Lancashire. She was taken in to Conway, Caernarfonshire on 27 December in a derelict condition.
Helene	United Kingdom	The ship was severely damaged by fire at Honfleur, Calvados, France.
Hope	United Kingdom	The schooner sprang a leak and foundered in the English Channel off Deadman Point, Cornwall. Her crew were rescued by Truro (United Kingdom). Hope was on a voyage from Cardiff, Glamorgan to London.
Jane	United Kingdom	The schooner was wrecked at Blackgang Chine, Isle of Wight. Her crew were rescued. She was on a voyage from Swansea, Glamorgan to Southampton, Hampshire.
J. C.	(United Kingdom of Great Britain and Ireland) British North America	The schooner was driven ashore and wrecked at Chegoggin, Nova Scotia. She was on a voyage from Prince Edward Island to Boston, Massachusetts, United States.
Lady Anne	United Kingdom	The ship was driven ashore at Flamborough Head, Yorkshire. She was on a voyage from Seaham, County Durham to Great Yarmouth, Norfolk. She was refloated on 6 January 1860 and taken in to Bridlington.
Larne	United Kingdom	The schooner was damaged by fire in Lough Swilly. She was on a voyage from Liverpool to Troon, Ayrshire.
Rolla	United Kingdom	The brig was driven ashore at Adra, Spain with the loss of all but five of her crew.
Tecumseh	United Kingdom	The barque was driven ashore at Hittarp, Sweden. She was on a voyage from Riga, Russia to London. She was refloated the next day and towed in to Helsingør, Denmark.
Tilla and Isis	United Kingdom	The ship was abandoned in the Atlantic Ocean a sinking condition. Her crew were rescued. She was on a voyage from Liverpool to Rio de Janeiro, Brazil.
Unity	United Kingdom	The ship ran aground on the Longsand, in the North Sea off the coast of Essex and was wrecked. Her crew were rescued. She was on a voyage from Guernsey, Channel Islands to London.

== 26 December ==
List of shipwrecks: 26 December 1859
Ship	State	Description
Caroline	United Kingdom	The brig was driven ashore at Gibraltar. She had been refloated by 7 January 1860.
Dreadnought	United Kingdom	The schooner was severely damaged at Gibraltar when the hulk Yarmouth (United Kingdom) drove into her.
Resoliode	Spain	The schooner was driven ashore at Gibraltar. She had been refloated by 7 January 1860.
Senegal	United Kingdom	The barque was abandoned in the Atlantic Ocean 80 nautical miles (150 km) north of Cape Finisterre, Spain. Her 25 crew were rescued by the steamship Brazil (Portugal). Senegal was on a voyage from Sunderland, County Durham to Málaga, Spain.
Thankful	United Kingdom	The ship was driven ashore at Alexandria, Egypt. She was refloated and put back to Alexandria.
William	United Kingdom	The smack was driven ashore at Porthdinllaen, Caernarfonshire.
Yarmouth	United Kingdom	The hulk was driven ashore at Gibraltar. She had been refloated by 7 December.

== 27 December ==
List of shipwrecks: 27 December 1859
Ship	State	Description
Alfred	United Kingdom	The ship ran aground on the Haisborough Sands, in the North Sea off the coast of Norfolk. She was on a voyage from Bridgwater, Somerset to Leith, Lothian. She was refloated and taken in to Great Yarmouth, Norfolk in a leaky condition.
Eling	United Kingdom	The brig was run ashore in Trafalgar Bay. Her crew were rescued. She was on a voyage from Liverpool, Lancashire to Syra, Greece and Smyrna, Ottoman Empire. Eling was refloated on 8 March 1860 and taken in tow by the steamship Maroora (Spain). The tow parted on 12 March and she was driven ashore and wrecked at "Barossa".
Endeavour	United Kingdom	The full-rigged ship was wrecked on Scatterie Island, Nova Scotia, British North America. Her crew were rescued. She was on a voyage from New York, United States to Saint John, New Brunswick, British North America.
Glenorchy	United Kingdom	The ship was driven ashore and wrecked on Eierland, North Holland, Netherlands. She was on a voyage from Surabaya, Netherlands East Indies to Amsterdam, North Holland.
HNLMS Onrust	Royal Netherlands Navy	The steamship was attacked in the Barito River by 600 people in prahas. All 57 crew were killed and the vessel was run aground.
Othello	United Kingdom	The brig foundered off Portland, Maine, United States. Her crew were rescued by Commerce de Paris (France).
Rose	United Kingdom	The ship capsized and was severely damaged at King's Lynn, Norfolk. She was on a voyage from King's Lynn to Newcastle upon Tyne, Northumberland.
Teesdale	United Kingdom	The schooner was driven ashore at Goswick, Northumberland. She was on a voyage from Dysart, Fife to Cádiz, Spain. She had become a wreck by 28 December. The wreck was towed in to Berwick upon Tweed on 11 January 1860.
Twee Gebroeders	Belgium	The galiot foundered in the Atlantic Ocean (46°32′N 4°25′W). Her five crew were rescued by Resolution (Spain). Twee Gebroeders was on a voyage from Newcastle upon Tyne to Málaga, Spain.

== 28 December ==
List of shipwrecks: 28 December 1859
Ship	State	Description
Gazelle	United Kingdom	The ship was driven ashore on Kaveroe, Sweden. She was on a voyage from London to Helsingborg, Sweden. She had been refloated by 2 January 1860 and taken in to Mollösund.
Heidelberg	United States	The full-rigged ship foundered in the Gulf of Mexico. Her crew were rescued by Maritaua ( Kingdom of Sardinia). Heidelberg was on a voyage from Key West, Florida to New Orleans, Louisiana.
Hercules	Netherlands	The barque ran aground on the Galloper Sand, in the Thames Estuary. She was refloated and anchored off North Foreland, Kent, United Kingdom.
Lars Nisted	(flag) Denmark	The schooner was driven ashore on Texel, North Holland, Netherlands. Her crew were rescued. She was on a voyage from Aalborg to Antwerp, Belgium.
William and Mary	United Kingdom	The brigantine was driven ashore and wrecked at the Mumbles, Glamorgan. She was on a voyage from Youghal, County Cork to Swansea, Glamrgan.

== 29 December ==
List of shipwrecks: 29 December 1859
Ship	State	Description
Sir Henry Pottinger	United Kingdom	The barque was wrecked at Carmarthen with the loss of a crew member. She was on a voyage from Caldera, Chile to Liverpool, Lancashire.

== 30 December ==
List of shipwrecks: 30 December 1859
Ship	State	Description
Britannia	United States	The ship was driven ashore near Barmouth, Merionethshire, United Kingdom. Some of her crew took to a boat, the remainder were rescued by the Barmouth Lifeboat. She was on a voyage from Savannah, Georgia to Liverpool, Lancashire, United Kingdom. She was refloated on 12 January 1860.
Bulwark	United Kingdom	The collier, a schooner, ran aground and was wrecked in the Belfast Lough.
Carl	Sweden	The schooner was driven ashore and sank at Blokhus, Denmark. She was on a voyage from Stockholm to Hull, Yorkshire, United Kingdom.
John Mullet	United Kingdom	The ship departed from A Coruña for Alicante, Spain between 30 December and 2 January 1860. No further trace, presumed foundered with the loss of all hands.
Teutonia	Prussia	The full-rigged ship was wrecked near the Corduan Lighthouse, Gironde, France. She was on a voyage from Stettin to Bordeaux, Gironde.
Trinidad	Spain	The brig ran aground on the Holm Sand, in the North Sea off the coast of Suffolk, United Kingdom and was wrecked. Her crew were rescued. She was on a voyage from Christiansand, Norway Santander.
Willem III	Netherlands	The ship was wrecked on the Middelbank, in the North Sea off the coast of Zeeland. She was on a voyage from Batavia, Netherlands East Indies to Rotterdam, South Holland.

== 31 December ==
List of shipwrecks: 31 December 1859
Ship	State	Description
Descovich	Austrian Empire	The barque was driven ashore and wrecked at Gallipoli, Ottoman Empire. She was on a voyage from Odesa to London, United Kingdom.
General Codrington	United Kingdom	The steamship was wrecked on the Morusse Reef, in the Baltic Sea off the coast of Sweden. She was on a voyage from Kronstadt, Russia to London.
Greyhound	United States	The ship ran aground on the Ossibaw Shoals. She was on a voyage from Rio de Janeiro, Brazil to Savannah, Georgia, She was refloated and resumed her voyage arriving on 3 January 1860.
King	United Kingdom	The ship collided with the ketch Mary ( (United Kingdom of Great Britain and Ireland) Jersey) and was abandoned in the North Sea off Spurn Point, Yorkshire. Her crew were rescued by Mary. King was on a voyage from South Shields, County Durham to London.
Martlett	United Kingdom	The steamship was driven ashore at Flamborough Head, Yorkshire. She was on a voyage from Hull, Yorkshire to Sunderland, County Durham. She was refloated and resumed her voyage.
Rosina	United Kingdom	The ship ran aground at South Shields. She was on a voyage from South Shields to Hong Kong. She was refloated and resumed her voyage, but consequently put in to Sunderland, County Durham in a leaky condition.
Samuel Speyvee	United Kingdom	The barque sank off Winterton-on-Sea, Norfolk. Her crew were rescued. She was on a voyage from North Shields, County Durham to London.
Tasso	United Kingdom	The ship ran aground and sank at South Shields, County Durham. She was on a voyage from South Shields to London.

== Unknown date ==
List of shipwrecks: Unknown date in December 1859
Ship	State	Description
Alexandra	Russia	The schooner was driven ashore on Gotland, Sweden before 27 December. She was on a voyage from Riga to Lübeck. She was refloated and taken in to Slitohamn, Sweden for repairs.
Annetta	United Kingdom	The ship sprang a leak and foundered 30 nautical miles (56 km) off Cape Matapan, Greece before 12 December. She was on a voyage from Sulina, Ottoman Empire to Falmouth, Cornwall or Queenstown, County Cork.
A. R. Valquardsen	Hamburg	The full-rigged ship was abandoned at sea. Her crew were rescued by Alliance (United States). A. R Valquardsen was on a voyage from Callao, Peru to an English port.
Bon Estrella	Portugal	The schooner foundered in the Atlantic Ocean before 14 December. Her crew survived.
Cleveland	United Kingdom	The steamship departed from Cardiff, Glamorgan for Gibraltar. No further trace, presumed foundered with the loss of all hands.
Clodomiro	Granadine Confederation	The brigantine sprang a leak and foundered off Punta Mala. Her crew were rescued. SHe was on a voyage from Chiriquí to La Unión.
Constitution	United Kingdom	The ship was wrecked at "Little Salvada". She was on a voyage from Liverpool, Lancashire to Mobile, Alabama, United States.
Dahlia	France	The ship foundered before 28 December. Her crew were rescued.
Diligent	United States	The steamship ran aground in the Missouri River upstream of Saint Louis, Missouri.
Elizabeth Ann	United Kingdom	The ship was lost in Kampong Bay. She was on a voyage from China to Australia.
Ellenita	Granadine Confederation	The brig was wrecked in the Navigators Islands. All on board took to a boat and a raft. One person on the raft died. Ellenita was on a voyage from Sydney, New South Wales to San Francisco, California, United States.
Emilia	United Kingdom	The ship ran aground at Bilbao. Her crew were rescued. She was on a voyage from Cádiz to Bilbao.
Enterprise	United Kingdom	The ship was driven ashore and wrecked south of Bridlington, Yorkshire. She was on a voyage from Middlesbrough, Yorkshire to London. She was refloated on 11 December and taken in to Bridlington.
Evelyn	United Kingdom	The schooner was driven ashore at Le Tréport, Seine-Inférieure. She was on a voyage from Sunderland to Le Tréport. She was refloated on 7 December and taken in to Le Tréport.
Fanny Forrester	United States	The ship was driven ashore near Livorno, United Provinces of Central Italy. Her crew were rescued. She was on a voyage from Livorno to Philadelphia, Pennsylvania.
Flora	United Kingdom	The ship foundered in the English Channel off the coast of Devon before 8 December.
Four Brothers	United Kingdom	The smack sank off the coast of Caernarfonshire between 19 and 28 December. She was on a voyage from Neath, Glamorgan to Port Madoc, Caernarfonshire.
Globe	United Kingdom	The barque was driven ashore on Dutch Island, Rhode Island, United States. She was on a voyage from South Shields, County Durham to Providence, Rhode Island. She had been refloated by 7 December and towed in to Providence.
Gordon	United Kingdom	The schooner collided with another vessel and sank in the Sloyne.
Hannibal	United Kingdom	The ship was lost at Hong Kong.
Haslediak	United Kingdom	The ship was wrecked near Sligo.
Hector	Sweden	The barque ran aground on the Shipwash Sand. She was refloated and assisted in to Harwich, Essex, United Kingdom.
Helen	United Kingdom	The ship foundered before 3 December. She was on a voyage from South Shields to Madras, India.
Ionia	United States of the Ionian Islands	The brig was wrecked 40 nautical miles (74 km) west of Muros, Spain before 23 December. Her crew were rescued. She was on a voyage from Taganrog, Russia to Lisbon, Portugal at Cork, United Kingdom.
Jacques Rocca	France	The brig was wrecked at Roquetas de Mar, Spain. She was on a voyage from Odesa to Rouen, Seine-Inférieure.
James Andrews	United States	The barque ran aground at the mouth of the Goatzalcos. Her crew were rescued.
J. H. Tiffary, and Milwaukee	United States	The schooner J. H. Tiffary collided with the steamship Milwaukee. Both vessels sank. Five crew of the schooner were lost.
Madras	United Kingdom	The ship was abandoned in the Atlantic Ocean. Her crew were rescued.
Margaret Nichol	(United Kingdom of Great Britain and Ireland) New South Wales	The schooner sprang a leak and was beached on Gabo Island, Victoria before 18 December. Her crew were rescued by the steamship Wonga Wonga ( (United Kingdom of Great Britain and Ireland) Victoria).
Meanwell	United Kingdom	The barque departed from an Irish port for the River Tyne. Nor further trace, presumed foundered with the loss of all hands.
Moffat	United Kingdom	The ship was abandoned in the Atlantic Ocean 300 nautical miles (560 km) off the coast of Newfoundland, British North America. Her crew were rescued by the steamship Circassian (United Kingdom). Moffat was on a voyage from Saint John's, Newfoundland to Liverpool.
Odette	Flag unknown	The ship was lost whilst bound for Rouen, Seine-Inférieure.
Pearl	United Kingdom	The ship collided with Eliza Thornton (United Kingdom) and foundered in the Atlantic Ocean with the loss of a crew member.
Pearl	(United Kingdom of Great Britain and Ireland) New South Wales	The schooner was captured and burnt in the Solomon Islands. Her crew were murdered by the local inhabitants.
Rose	United Kingdom	The schooner foundered in the Bay of Biscay (44°43′N 9°43′W). Her crew were rescued by Racoon (United Kingdom). Rose was on a voyage from London to Lisbon, Portugal.
Sarah Elizabeth	(United Kingdom of Great Britain and Ireland) British North America	The schooner was wrecked on Devil's Island, Nova Scotia.
Somnouth	United Kingdom	The ship was wrecked on the Blackwater Bank, in the Irish Sea. She was on a voyage from Liverpool to Savannah, Georgia.
Stoicien	Flag unknown	The ship was driven ashore near "Galippa", Beylik of Tunis.
Sully	France	The ship ran aground off Inagua, Bahamas before 12 December She was on a voyage from Marseille, Bouches-du-Rhône to Haiti. She was refloated and taken in to Inagua, but was consequently condemned.
Swea	Sweden	The steamship sprang a leak and sank at Kalmar.
Union	United Kingdom	The ship was driven ashore near Cape Bon, Algeria.
Valkyrien	Denmark	The schooner ran aground on the Andrews Sand, in the North Sea off the coast of Essex. She was refloated and put back to Harwich.
Ver	United Kingdom	The barque was abandoned in the Atlantic Ocean before 14 December.
Vibilia	United Kingdom	The brig sank 5 nautical miles (9.3 km) off Houat, Morbihan, France.
Villa Javea	Spain	The ship ran aground and sank at Bilbao. She was on a voyage from Valencia to Bilbao.
Woodside	United Kingdom	The ship was driven ashore at Warrenpoint, County Down.
Zwei Gebroeder	Prussia	The ship was driven ashore at Kiel after 19 December. She was refloated and taken in to Kiel for repairs.
