= Dance-class minesweeper =

Defunct Group of British minesweeper ships

Class overview
- Name: Dance class
- In service: 1917–1920
- Completed: 14
- Lost: 2
- Retired: 12

General characteristics
- Type: Minesweeper
- Displacement: 265–290 long tons (269–295 t)
- Length: 130 ft (40 m)
- Beam: 26–27 ft (7.9–8.2 m)
- Propulsion: Machinery: Vertical compound; Boilers: Cylindrical; 450 ihp (340 kW)
- Speed: 9.25–10 knots (17.13–18.52 km/h; 10.64–11.51 mph)
- Range: 37–41.5 tons oil
- Complement: 22–26 men
- Armament: 1 × 3-pounder except: 1 × 12-pounder + 1 × 6-pounder (Gavotte); 1 × 6-pounder AA (Step Dance)

The Dance-class minesweepers were series of minesweepers of the Royal Navy. They were originally designed as a shallow-draft twin-screw tunnel tugs, and were taken over by the British Admiralty as coastal minesweeping sloops. They were completed between November 1917 and September 1918 under the Emergency War Programme, during World War I.

== Ships ==
Fourteen ships were built in the Dance class, and each was named after a type of dance, the ships were:

- Cotillion – October 1917; Used to sweep coast of Flanders. Sold in May 1920. Builder: Day, Summers (265 tons)
- Coverley – October 1917; Used to sweep coast of Flanders. Sold in May 1920. Builder: Ferguson Bros.(265 tons)
- Fandango – April 1919; Used to sweep coastal areas of Northern Russia. Mined and sunk 3 July 1919.
- Gavotte – December 1917;Used to sweep coast of Flanders. Given back to War Office in 1920. Builder: Goole Co.
- Hornpipe – October 1917; Used to sweep coast of Flanders. Sold in May 1920. Builder: Murdoch & Murray. (265 tons)
- Mazurka – October 1917; Used to sweep coast of Flanders. Sold in May 1920. Builder: Murdoch & Murray. (265 tons)
- Minuet – October 1917; Used to sweep coast of Flanders. Sold in May 1920. Builder: Day, Summers (265 tons)
- Morris Dance – April 1919; Used to sweep coastal areas of Northern Russia. Sold in May 1920.
- Pirouette – December 1917; Used to sweep coast of Flanders. Given back to War Office in 1920. Builder: Rennie Forrest
- Quadrille – October 1917; Used to sweep coast of Flanders. Sold in May 1920. Builder: Ferguson Bros. (265 tons)
- Sarabande – December 1917; Used to sweep coast of Flanders. Given back to War Office in 1920. Builder: Goole Co.
- Step Dance – April 1919; Used to sweep coastal areas of Northern Russia. Sold in May 1920.
- Sword Dance – April 1919; Used to sweep coastal areas of Northern Russia. Mined and sunk 24 June 1919.
- Tarantella – December 1917; Used to sweep coast of Flanders. Builder: Hamilton
