= HMS Morris Dance (1919) =

World War I Royal Navy minesweeper

HMS Morris Dance was a Dance-class minesweeper used after World War I to clear sea mines. It was built in 1919 by the Lytham Shipbuilding & Engineering Co Ltd.

== Design and construction ==
In July 1917, the Royal Navy had a requirement for a shallow-draught minesweeper, suitable for operations in harbours and rivers, and it was suggested that the 'tunnel tugs' being built for the War Department for river operations in Mesopotamia, were suitable for this role (as part of the Mesopotamian campaign), and in October that year, it was agreed that the Royal Navy would purchase six of the tugs which were under construction, with a further four more purchased in December 1917. The ten ships were based at Dunkirk in 1918, operating off the Flanders coast.

In April 1919, four more ships were transferred from the War Department for service in North Russia in the North Russia intervention in the Russian Civil War. One of these ships, T.99, was built by the Lytham Shipbuilding and Engineering Company, at their Lytham St Annes, Lancashire yard in 1918, and renamed Morris Dance on transfer.

Morris Dance was 130 ft (39.6 m) long between perpendiculars, with a beam of 26 ft 3 in (8.00 m) and a draught of 3 ft 6 in (1.07 m). Displacement was 265 long tons (269 t). The ship was powered by a 450 ihp (340 kW) compound steam engine, which powered two propellers mounted in tunnels under the hull to minimise the draught. Speed was 9.5 kn (10.9 mph; 17.6 km/h). The ship had a crew of 22–26 officers and men.
