= HMS Annan =

River-class frigate of the Royal Navy

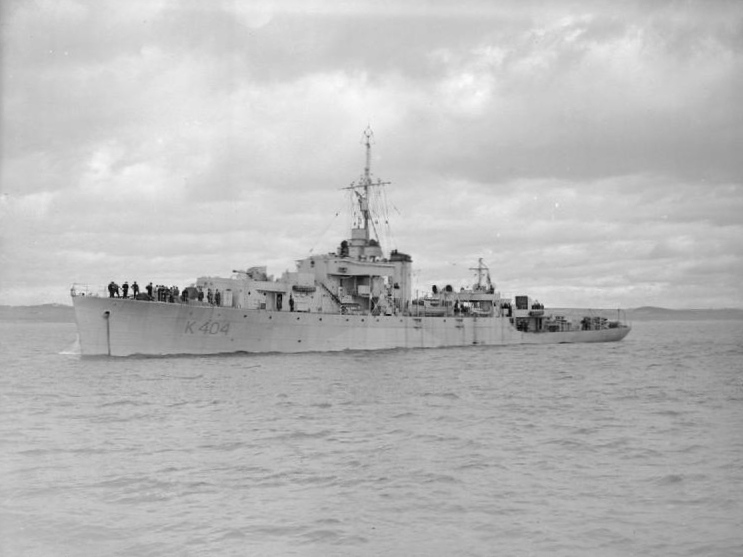
- HMS Annan at anchor

History

United Kingdom
- Name: Annan
- Namesake: River Annan
- Ordered: 26 December 1942
- Builder: Hall, Russell & Co. Ltd., Aberdeen
- Laid down: 10 June 1943
- Launched: 29 December 1943
- Identification: pennant number: K 404
- Fate: Transferred to Canada 13 January 1944; Returned 20 June 1945; Sold to Denmark November 1945

Canada
- Name: Annan
- Commissioned: 13 January 1944
- Decommissioned: 20 June 1945
- Identification: pennant number: K 404
- Honours and awards: Atlantic 1944, North Sea 1944
- Fate: Returned to Royal Navy 1945

Denmark
- Name: Niels Ebbesen
- Namesake: Niels Ebbesen
- Commissioned: 27 November 1945
- Decommissioned: 8 May 1963
- Identification: pennant number: F 339
- Fate: Broken up 1963 at Odense

General characteristics
- Class & type: River-class frigate
- Displacement: 1,445 long tons (1,468 t); 2,110 long tons (2,140 t) (deep load)
- Length: 283 ft (86.26 m) p/p; 301.25 ft (91.82 m)o/a
- Beam: 36.5 ft (11.13 m)
- Draught: 9 ft (2.74 m); 13 ft (3.96 m) (deep load)
- Propulsion: 2 × Admiralty 3-drum boilers, 2 shafts; Reciprocating vertical triple expansion, 5,500 ihp (4,100 kW)
- Speed: 20 knots (37.0 km/h); 20.5 knots (38.0 km/h) (turbine ships)
- Range: 7,500 nautical miles (13,890 km) at 15 knots (27.8 km/h)
- Endurance: 646 long tons (656 t; 724 short tons) oil fuel
- Complement: 157
- Armament: 2 × QF 4 in (102 mm) /45 Mk. XVI on twin mount HA/LA Mk.XIX; 1 × QF 12 pdr (3 in (76 mm)) 12 cwt/40 Mk. V on mounting HA/LA Mk.IX (not all ships); 8 × 20 mm QF Oerlikon A/A on twin mounts Mk.V; 1 × Hedgehog 24 spigot A/S projector; Up to 150 depth charges

HMS Annan was a River-class frigate built for the Royal Navy but was transferred to the Royal Canadian Navy before commissioning. She served with the Royal Canadian Navy during the Second World War and saw action primarily as a convoy escort in the Battle of the Atlantic. She was returned to United Kingdom following the war and quickly sold to Denmark, who renamed the vessel Niels Ebbesen. She was primarily used as a training vessel until 1963 when she was broken up at Odense. She was named for the River Annan in Scotland in UK and Canadian service and Niels Ebbesen in Danish service.

== Background and description ==
The River-class frigate design was an upgraded version of the Flower-class corvette, remedying many of the Flower class' issues as an ocean escort. The initial vessels were constructed for the Royal Navy and were named for rivers, however, in Canada, they were named for cities. Canada was informed of the design development in December 1940, but the plans were not delivered until late April 1941. The design was too large to fit through the canals on the St. Lawrence River, restricting the construction of the River-class ships to three shipyards, all with direct access to the sea. The first fifteen Canadian ships followed the standard British design.

The frigates measured 301 feet 4 inches (91.85 m) long overall and 283 ft 0 in (86.26 m) between perpendiculars with a beam of 36 ft 7 in (11.15 m) and a draught of 9 ft 0 in (2.74 m). They had a standard displacement of 1,445 long tons (1,468 t) and had increased flare and sheer forward to improve the vessel's dryness at sea. They were square amidships with deep bilge keels to alleviate rolling in heavy seas. They had a complement of 10 officers and 135 ratings.

The River class were powered by a steam created by two Admiralty three-drum boilers pumped to a vertical triple expansion engine turning two propeller shafts. The system creating 5,500 indicated horsepower (4,100 kW) giving the ships a maximum speed of 20 knots (37 km/h; 23 mph). The frigates carried 440 long tons (450 t) of oil fuel and they had a range of 7,200 nautical miles (13,300 km; 8,300 mi) at 12 knots (22 km/h; 14 mph).

The first 15 Canadian ships that followed the British design mounted a single 4-inch (102 mm) gun forward and one aft. The remaining Canadian ships mounted twin 4-inch guns forward and a single 12-pounder naval gun aft. The Canadian ships had eight 20 mm (0.79 in) cannon in four twin powered mounts for anti-aircraft defence. They also mounted four heavy machine guns. Two of the 20 mm mounts faced forward and two astern, with two located on the bridge wings and two at the break of the forecastle. For anti-submarine warfare (ASW) the ships carried a Hedgehog ASW mortar forward and the frigates initially carried 100 depth charges, later rising to 145, to be fired from four throwers and two stern tracks and rails. Two of the throwers were located on the port side of the ship, and the other two on the starboard side. 30 charges were kept for the rails and racks and 32 for the throwers. During the war, all of the early ships that mounted single 4-inch guns forward were refitted to carry the twin mount instead. Furthermore, the 12-pounder guns were replaced by twin 40 mm (1.6 in) cannon.

The River-class frigates were equipped with the Type 147B Sword sonar and ASDIC which were used in conjunction to find submarines below the surface. The combination of the two allowed for the frigates to maintain tracking targets even while firing. For tracking surfaced submarines, HFDF was installed. HFDF searched for the communication signals of opposing submarines, which had to surface to communicate.

== Construction and service ==
Annan was ordered for the Royal Navy and laid down on 10 June 1943 by Hall, Russell & Co. Ltd. at their shipyard in Aberdeen, Scotland. The vessel was launched on 29 December 1943 as Annan, named for a river in Scotland. In 1944, the vessel was one of seven frigates transferred to Canada and was handed over to the Royal Canadian Navy for commissioning on 13 January 1944 at Aberdeen, retaining her British name. After working up at Tobermory, Annan joined the escort group EG 6 at Londonderry. The escort group was composed entirely of Canadian frigates and patrolled and escorted convoys in coastal waters around the United Kingdom. The escort group was assigned to Operation Neptune and underwent additional training in the Western Approaches to fight German E-boats. While the Allies were landing in Normandy, EG 6 was assigned to Operation CA, in which the escort group was among those assigned to patrol off Land's End to prevent any infiltration of the English Channel by German surface or subsurface units during the invasion, beginning on 5 June. On 9/10 June, while operating southwest of the Scilly Isles, EG 6 was attacked by a German submarine which severely damaged HMCS Teme.

In September 1944, Operation SJ was commenced, in which the escort groups were deployed in the passages between Norway and the Atlantic Ocean around Iceland, the Faroe Islands, and the Shetland Islands. The deployment was made in response to the use of the passages by German U-boats to access the North Atlantic while operating from Norway. EG 6 was re-assigned from the Western Approaches to the Faroes–Shetlands gap, and operated alongside escort carriers. On 16 October 1944, while on patrol, EG 6 encountered the German submarine U-1006 south of the Faroes. In conjunction with HMCS Loch Achanalt, the two ships forced the U-boat to surface and then after an exchange of gunfire, the submarine was sunk by Annan by depth charge. Annan rescued forty-six survivors from the U-boat. The true nature of the sinking was covered up and a ruse involving new minefields was concocted and used by British intelligence to convince the Germans that the gap was not safe for submarine travel. The actual details of U-1006's sinking were published a year later. In April 1945, EG 6 was transferred to Halifax, Nova Scotia. However, the following month, Annan returned to the United Kingdom and was handed back to the Royal Navy at Sheerness on 20 June 1945. For her service during the war, Annan was awarded the battle honours "Atlantic 1944" and "North Sea 1944".

=== Post-war service ===
Annan was sold to the Royal Danish Navy on 22 November 1945 as one of two River-class frigates. The two ships were renamed the Holger Danske class. Annan was renamed Niels Ebbesen for the Danish squire Niels Ebbesen and given the pennant number F 339. She was used as a training ship for naval cadets, carrying up to 90 trainees. Niels Ebbesen went through several refits during her service with the Royal Danish Navy, being rearmed with 127 mm (5 in) main guns in 1948 and adding two 457 mm (18 in) torpedo tubes for training purposes between 1946 and 1952. She was decommissioned on 8 May 1963 and broken up that year at Odense, Denmark.
