= Dance-class trawler =

British anti-submarine warships

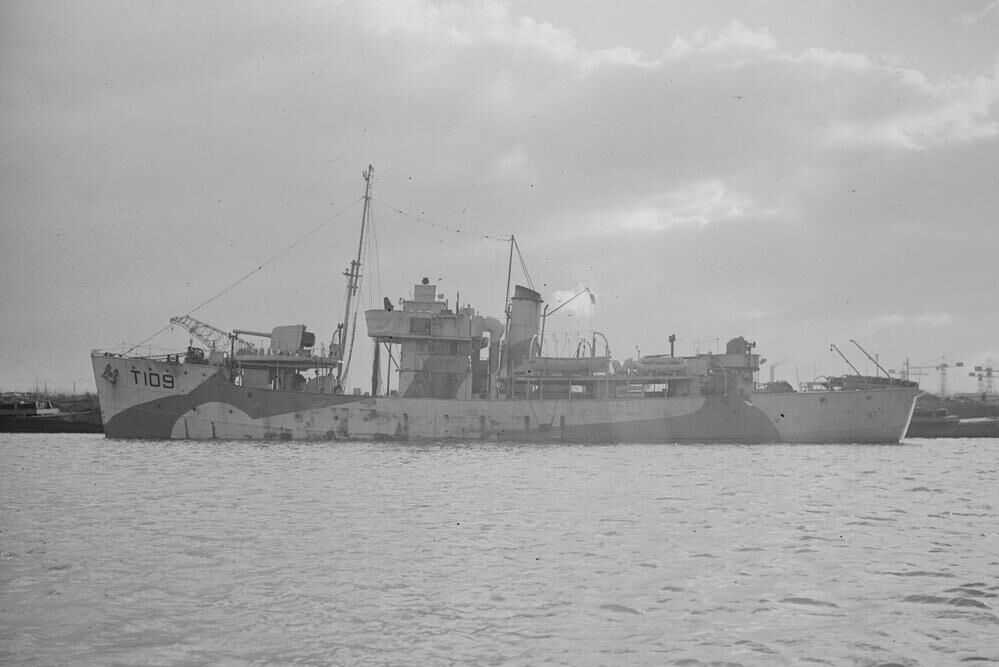
- HMT Foxtrot in December 1942

Class overview
- Name: Dance class
- Operators: Royal Navy; Portuguese Navy; Italian Navy
- Built: 1940–1941
- In service: 1940–1946
- Completed: 20

General characteristics
- Type: Armed trawler
- Displacement: 545 tons
- Length: 164 ft (50 m)
- Beam: 27 ft 8 in (8.43 m)
- Draught: 11 ft 1 in (3.38 m) (mean)
- Propulsion: One triple expansion reciprocating engine, 850 ihp (630 kW)
- Speed: 12 knots (22 km/h; 14 mph)
- Complement: 40
- Armament: 1 × 4 in (102 mm) gun; 3 × 20 mm Oerlikon cannon; 30 depth charges

The Dance class of World War II were armed trawlers of the Royal Navy. They were used for anti-submarine (A/S) and minesweeping work and were nearly identical to the Isles class, of which they are usually considered a subclass. They were very similar to Tree class trawlers, and were only more armed.

One Dance-class trawler (Sword Dance) was a war loss, and one (Saltarelo) was transferred to Portugal in 1945. Four were transferred to Italy in 1946: Gavotte, Hornpipe, Minuet and Two Step. None remained in service with the Royal Navy by the end of 1946. Many of these ships were named after dances or traditions.

== Ships in class ==
Construction data for Isles-class trawlers of the Royal Navy
Ship	Pennant number	Builder	Launched	Completed	Notes
Cotillion	T104	Ardrossan Dockyard Company, Ardrossan, UK	21 December 1940	8 August 1941	Sold 28 March 1947
Coverley	T106	Ardrossan Dockyard Company, Ardrossan, UK	21 May 1941	8 August 1941	Mercantile Jannikke 1947, Otofjord 1949
Fandango	T107	Cochrane & Sons	26 March 1940	11 July 1940	Sold 1946
Foxtrot	T109	Cochrane & Sons	23 April 1940	30 August 1940	To War Department 1946, scrapped Barrow 1951
Gavotte	T115	Cook, Welton & Gemmell	7 May 1940	24 August 1940	To Italy 1946 as RD.312
Hornpipe	T120	Cook, Welton & Gemmell	21 May 1940	19 September 1940	To Italy 1946 as RD.316
Mazurka	T30	Ferguson Brothers (Port Glasgow) Ltd., Port Glasgow, UK	28 November 1940	8 January 1941	Sold March 1946
Minuet	T131	Ferguson Brothers (Port Glasgow) Ltd.	1 March 1941	10 June 1941	To Italy 1946 as RD.307
Morris Dance	T117	Goole Shipbuilding	6 August 1940	7 October 1940	Sold 1947
Pirouette	T39	Goole Shipbuilding	22 June 1940	30 August 1940	Mercantile Tridente 1947
Polka	T139	Hall, Russell & Company, Aberdeen	29 January 1941	17 June 1941	Sold April 1946
Quadrille	T133	Hall, Russell & Company	16 March 1941	14 July 1941	Mercantile Elsa 1946, Murten 1950
Rumba	T122	A. & J. Inglis, Glasgow	31 July 1940	2 October 1940	Mercantile Rumba 1946, Buk Hae Ho 1953
Sarabande	T125	A. & J. Inglis	29 August 1940	17 December 1940	Mercantile Volen 1946, Betty 1953
Saltarelo	T128	Henry Robb, Leith	6 August 1940	19 October 1940	To Portugal 1947 as Salvador Correia
Sword Dance	T132	Henry Robb	3 September 1940	16 January 1941	Sank after collision with Thyra-II off east coast of Scotland 5 July 1942
Tango	T146	Smith's Dock Company	29 November 1940	21 April 1940	Sold July 1946
Tarantella	T142	Smith's Dock Company	27 January 1941	9 May 1941	Renamed Two Step 1943; To Italy 1946 as RD.308
Valse	T151	Smith's Dock Company	12 March 1941	23 May 1941	To War Department 1946, scrapped Port Glasgow September 1951
Veleta	T130	Smith's Dock Company	28 March 1941	6 June 1941	Sold March 1946

== See also ==
- Portuguese-class naval trawler
- Tree-class trawler
- Shakespearian-class trawler
- Trawlers of the Royal Navy
