= Ocean King =

A number of ships have been named Ocean King, including:

- SS Ocean King, a Hong Kong steamship in service 1964–71
- MV Ocean King, a Philippines ferry which capsized in 2009
