= HMT Richard Bacon =

British Castle-class naval trawler

- Richard Bacon in later life, as the trawler Daily Chronicle

History

United Kingdom
- Name: HMT Richard Bacon
- Builder: Cook, Welton & Gemmell, Beverley
- Yard number: 382
- Laid down: 1917
- Launched: 2 November 1917
- In service: March 1918
- Out of service: 7 July 1922

General characteristics
- Class & type: Castle-class trawler
- Tonnage: 281 GRT, 109 NRT net
- Length: 125 feet 5 inches (38.23 m)
- Beam: 23 feet 5 inches (7.14 m)
- Draught: 12 feet 7 inches (3.84 m)
- Propulsion: T 3-Cyl; 87 rhp. 480 horsepower (360 kW). Single shaft. Engine built by Amos & Smith Co., Hull
- Speed: 10.5 knots (19.4 km/h; 12.1 mph)
- Complement: 12
- Armament: 1 × 12 pounder 76 mm (3.0 in); 1 × depth charge thrower; Minesweeping gear
- Armour: Steel-sided hull

HMT Richard Bacon (FY3587) was a British Castle-class naval trawler completed in 1918. She served through both world wars under two different names and also had a lengthy career as a civilian fishing trawler. For a short while, she functioned as a support vessel for a famous transatlantic flight by a group of Italian bombers. She was scrapped in 1954 after her boiler failed during a storm.

== History ==
=== First World War and subsequent civilian service ===
Richard Bacon was one of 217 Castle-class trawlers laid down for the British government in the First World War. Displacing 360 short tons (330 t) standard and armed with a single 12-pounder gun, she was mostly used for coastal anti-submarine patrols.

Richard Bacon was built at Cook, Welton & Gemmell at Beverley. Upon completion on 12 March 1918, she had a crew of 12 men and served an uneventful few years on anti-submarine and coastal patrol duties. After the war, she was registered as a fishing vessel at London under registry number LO438, taking up that role officially on 24 August 1920. After two years under Admiralty ownership, she was sold to the Boston Deep Sea Fishing & Ice Co Ltd, Boston, Lincolnshire, and her London registry was closed. As a result of the sale, she was renamed Haganby and registered at Boston under registry number BN179 and manager Fred Parkes. In 1923, she was transferred to Fleetwood, near Blackpool, when the Boston Deep Sea Fishing & Ice moved location.

In February 1925, she was sold again, this time to a French fisherman named Victor Fourny. She was renamed Professeur Bergonié, after Jean Bergonié, and registered at Boulogne. After several years in France, the Boston Deep Sea Fishing repurchased her on 4 March 1930, and she was renamed again, this time to the Daily Chronicle (FD69), registered at Fleetwood. She also returned to the same manager as in Boston, Fred Parkes. It was during this time that she had her first unusual duty – on 5 July 1933, she was chartered by the Italian Government to support a transatlantic flight by 24 Savoia-Marchetti S.55X seaplanes. The flight was led by General Italo Balbo, and covered 6,100 miles (9,800 km), from Orbetello to Chicago, via Iceland, in 47 hours 52 minutes. She collided with the steam trawler Jacinta at St Kilda fishing grounds on 12 August 1934. Although the starboard side of Jacinta was damaged, the Daily Chronicle remained undamaged. On 5 November 1934, her registry at Fleetwood ended, and she was sold to Thomas L Devlin & Sons of Granton, registered there, and renamed Commodator (GN6).

=== Second World War ===
On 29 August 1939, with the Second World War imminent, Commodator was requisitioned by the Admiralty once more, and converted to a minesweeping trawler, becoming HMT Commodator (FY634). The hire rate was £84.6.0d per month – approximately £2,500. In 1943, she was sold to Mrs E D Breen of Edinburgh, though she remained in use by the Admiralty. In June 1945, after the end of the war in Europe, she was sold to Grimsby Merchants Amalgamated Fishing Co Ltd and gained pennant number GY57 but remained under military command. On 4 October 1945, she was re-classed at Glasgow and returned to her owner.

=== Post-war ===
After the war, she stayed briefly in Grimsby, before being sold in February 1946 to Don Trawling Co (Milford) Ltd in Milford Haven. On 20 April 1946 she was in the fishing grounds off the west coast of Ireland during an 85-mile-per-hour (137 km/h) gale. The gale shifted 140 short tons (130 t) of coal in her bunker, forcing the ship onto her beam ends – so that the deck was near-vertical. The crew spent five and a half hours moving the coal by hand to restore her to an even keel and were eventually forced to put into Berehaven, County Cork.

In July 1948, she was renamed again, to her final name: Lynandi. She had a relatively uneventful few years, until 1954, when she had an accident which ended her career. On 14 January 1954, she was fishing off Old Head of Kinsale under her skipper W G King when her boiler developed problems. She was forced to blowdown her boiler and as a result, lost power. The steam trawler Inverforth began to tow her back to Milford, but two days and 100 miles (160 km) later, during heavy weather, the tow parted and two attempts to reconnect it failed. She was in danger of drifting onto St Ann's Head, 23 miles (37 km) distant. The Angle lifeboat and the tug Empire Rosa launched from Pembroke Dock but were unable to reach the trawler, which was in the middle of 40 foot (12 m) waves. Inverforth and another trawler, the Thomas Booth (M274) stayed close, however, and allowed Lynandi to keep her bearings. The storm abated through the morning, and by 11 am the Empire Rosa had returned and was able to connect a tow line. By 4:15 pm, the Lynandi was safely back in Milford harbour. Her skipper commended the actions of both his own crew and those crews who assisted, and praised the seaworthiness of his ship, saying "Although out of control, she proved a perfect sea ship and throughout the night never shipped a drop of water."

Later in 1954, she was sold to BISCO and allocated to Thos. W. Ward. On 27 August she was delivered to Castle Pill for breaking up, and in October her Grimsby registry was closed.
