= Empire Palace =

Empire Palace may refer to

- A number of cinemas run by Moss Empires with this name
- SS Empire Palace, a British coaster in service 1945-49
