= HMT Night Hawk =

Royal Navy armed trawler

History

United Kingdom
- Name: Night Hawk
- Builder: Cook, Welton & Gemmell, Beverley
- Completed: 1911
- Acquired: 1914
- Fate: Sunk 25 December 1914

General characteristics
- Tons burthen: 287
- Propulsion: 1 × 3-cylinder triple expansion steam engine

Night Hawk was an armed trawler of the Royal Navy that served in the First World War. She was built in 1911 as a fishing trawler but was requisitioned by the Navy at the start of the war. While working to clear a minefield laid by the Germans during the raid on Scarborough, Hartlepool and Whitby Night Hawk struck a mine and sank on Christmas Day 1914, with the loss of six of her crew.

== Early career ==
Night Hawk was built by Cook, Welton & Gemmell at Beverley, Yorkshire, in 1911. She had a steel hull and was driven by a 3-cylinder triple expansion steam engine and a single boiler. Night Hawk had a tonnage of 287 and was used as a fishing trawler based in Grimsby, Lincolnshire. At the outbreak of the First World War she was requisitioned by the Admiralty for the Royal Navy to serve as a mine trawler with the Auxiliary Patrol. In this role she became His Majesty's Trawler Night Hawk and had pendant number FY 57.

== Scarborough minefield and sinking ==
SMS Kolberg pictured in French service after the war

On 16 December 1914 a German force of battlecruisers and an armoured cruiser had bombarded the English east coast towns of Scarborough, Hartlepool and Whitby. The light cruiser Kolberg had accompanied this force, carrying 100 mines. As the other vessels bombarded the towns Kolberg laid her mines off Flamborough Head, creating the densest minefield seen in naval warfare to that time. One explanation of the German strategy is that the bombardment served as a distraction for the minelaying, which was intended to damage any elements of the British fleet sent to respond to the German force. In any case the mines laid that day proved more destructive than the bombardment. Three British merchant ships were sunk the day the mines were laid, with the loss of 31 lives, and they claimed dozens more ships and hundreds of men killed.

Night Hawk and a group of other mine trawlers were dispatched to the scene, arriving 19 December. Night Hawk trawled for mines between Whitby and Flamborough Head on Christmas Eve, before returning to port at Whitby. The method involved dragging a cable through the sea to snag the mines which sometimes exploded and sometimes were brought to the surface where they were detonated by rifle fire.

Night Hawk left Whitby at 07:00 the next morning to continue trawling. She was trawling some 3.5–4 nautical miles (6.5–7.4 km; 4.0–4.6 mi) off Scarborough when she struck a mine. The bottom of the ship broke away from the rest of the vessel and she sank within ten seconds. All five men below decks – an engineman, two trimmers, a deckhand and a cook – were drowned. The senior engineman, Alfred Chapple, was above deck and was thrown into the sea with the other seven crew members. The vessel's commander, Sub-Lieutenant William Senior of the Royal Naval Reserve managed to reach a life raft and paddled around, pulling the survivors onto it. It was judged unsafe to send large vessels to their rescue so the men were taken aboard small boats. They had been in the cold water and in high winds for around 30 minutes. Chapple died from shock and exhaustion while being taken to shore; only one other survivor was injured, the skipper Harry Evans who had a slight wound on his head.

== Aftermath ==
Later in the day the same minefield sank the merchant vessels Gem and Eli. The steamer Gallier was also struck but survived and was assisted by Auxiliary Patrol vessels to return to Scarborough. A safe channel through the Scarborough minefield was achieved by Boxing Day but it was not fully cleared until April 1915. Three other trawlers were sunk during the mine clearing work. Chapple was buried at Cleethorpes Cemetery; the other crewmen have no known grave and are remembered on the Chatham Naval Memorial.

In 1973 part of Night Hawk's bow was recovered after having been caught in the net of a fishing trawler; it was placed in a museum at Scalby Mills, Scarborough. Her wreck was dived upon by the Filey Sub-Aqua Association who found a boiler on the seabed and part of the bow section as the only significant remains. Another Night Hawk trawler was built in 1915 and also went on to serve in the Royal Navy, in the Second World War from 1940 to 1946.

== See also ==
- Trawlers of the Royal Navy
