= HMS Grenadier =

Military class trawler in the British Royal Navy

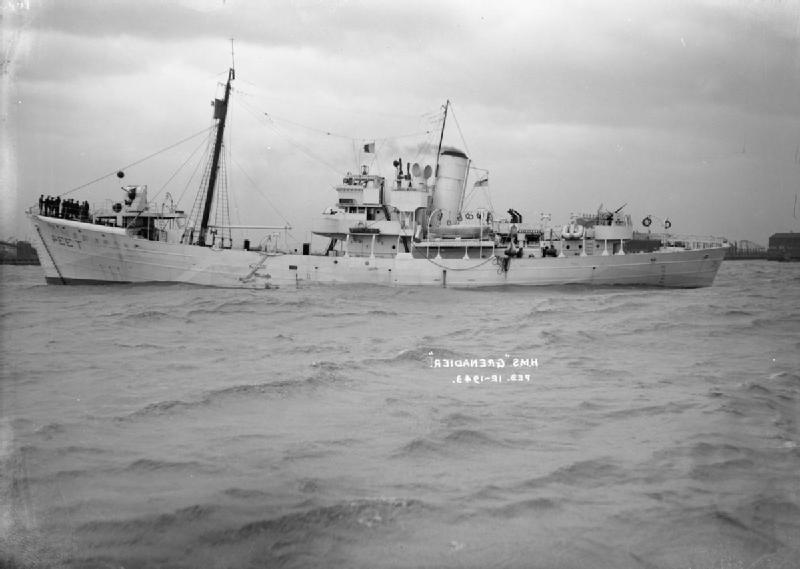

History

United Kingdom
- Name: HMS Grenadier
- Builder: Cook, Welton & Gemmell, Beverley
- Laid down: 13 June 1942
- Launched: 26 September 1942
- Commissioned: 10 February 1943
- Fate: Scrapped

General characteristics
- Class & type: Military class trawler

HMS Grenadier (Pennant number: T334) was a Military class trawler of the British Royal Navy, which served as an Anti Submarine Warfare Vessel during the Second World War. The ship was built by Cook, Welton & Gemmell in Beverley, England. She was laid down on 13 June 1942, launched on 26 September 1942 and finally commissioned on 10 February 1943. Her role was to support convoys, and deter attack by German U-boats using depth charges. This class of vessel could be fitted with extra guns, and the Grenadier was reported to have had an extra pair of Oerlikon 20mm guns and a Type 290 mast mounted radar.

Her most notable engagement occurred on 16 March 1945. That morning she was in convoy alongside the steam merchant Inger Toft, now operating under the Ministry of War Transport, when at 0900 Inger Toft was struck by a torpedo fired from German submarine U-722 and began to quickly sink. The skipper of Grenadier at the time was A/SkrLt Arthur George Day of the Royal Navy Reserve. It was common practice when under attack, for the skipper to order the crew to take the vessel to full propulsion whilst dropping depth charges, to avoid being hit whilst trying to hunt the culprit U-boat. A/SkrLt Day realised that the men of Inger Toft whose vessel had now fallen beneath the water would have little chance of survival if they followed this routine. He ordered his men to turn the vessel into the direction of the sunken vessel. Whilst ultimately risking his vessel and entire crew, they managed to save the entire 30 man crew of Inger Toft including the master from the freezing waters. For his actions A/SkrLt Arthur George Day was mentioned in dispatches, he received an oak leaf to be worn on his 1939-1945 war medal. Following the war he returned to his pre-war occupation as a skipper operating from the small fishing port of Milford Haven, Pembrokeshire Wales.

Once the war ended Grenadier was first sold to a merchant fishing firm in Grimsby, she was renamed Thurinigia, later in 1947 she was converted for oil burning but by 1966 she was sold for scrap.
