= Military-class trawler =

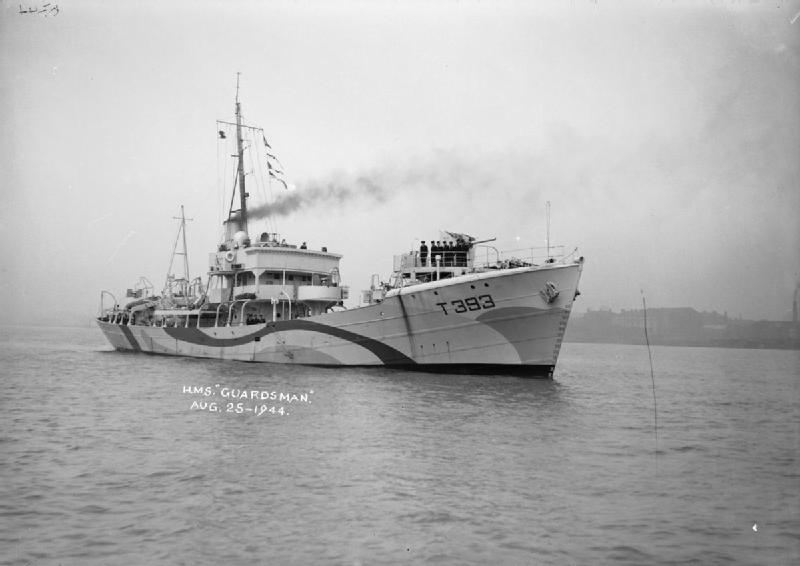
- HMS Guardsman in 1944

Class overview
- Builders: Cook, Welton & Gemmell, Beverley
- Operators: Royal Navy
- Built: 1941–1944
- In commission: 1943–1945
- Completed: 9
- Lost: nil

General characteristics
- Type: Naval trawler
- Displacement: 830 long tons (843 t)
- Length: 193 ft (59 m)
- Beam: 30 ft (9.1 m)
- Draught: 14.10 ft (4.30 m)
- Propulsion: Reciprocating engine, 1 shaft
- Speed: 12.5 knots (23.2 km/h; 14.4 mph)
- Complement: 40
- Armament: 1 × 4in/40 QF gun; 4-8 × Oerlikon 20 mm AA guns; 65 × depth charges

The Military class of Admiralty trawlers was a small class of trawlers built for the Royal Navy during the Second World War.

The vessels were intended for use as minesweepers and for anti-submarine warfare, and the design was based on a commercial type, Lady Madeleine by Cook Welton and Gemmell of Beverley. The purpose of the order was to make use of specialist mercantile shipyards to provide vessels for war use by adapting commercial designs to Admiralty specifications. Between 1941 and 1943 the Royal Navy ordered nine such vessels from Cook Welton and Gemmel. All saw active service, but none were lost in action. The Military-class trawlers were the largest trawlers built for the Royal Navy and bear comparison with the Flower-class corvettes.

== Ships ==
- Bombardier (T304), completed 19 May 1943
- Coldstreamer (T337), completed 10 April 1943
- Fusilier (T305), completed 30 April 1943
- Grenadier (T334), completed 10 February 1943
- Guardsman (T393), completed 22 August 1944
- Home Guard (T394), completed 10 September 1944
- Lancer (T335), completed 25 February 1943
- Royal Marine (T395), completed 30 October 1944
- Sapper (T336), completed 19 March 1943

== See also ==
- Trawlers of the Royal Navy
