= MV Ocean King =

Ferry that capsized in 2009

MV Ocean King was an inter-island Ro-Ro ferry which partially capsized off Southern Leyte, Philippines, on 28 July 2009 with 121 people on board. All wet, but none lost. The vessel is reported to have sailed its maiden voyage on 16 April 2009 with the Philippines president on board.

An earlier vessel of the same name was owned by Avon Shipping & Trading Co, Hong Kong in the 1960s and scrapped in 1971.
