= HMCS Laurentian =

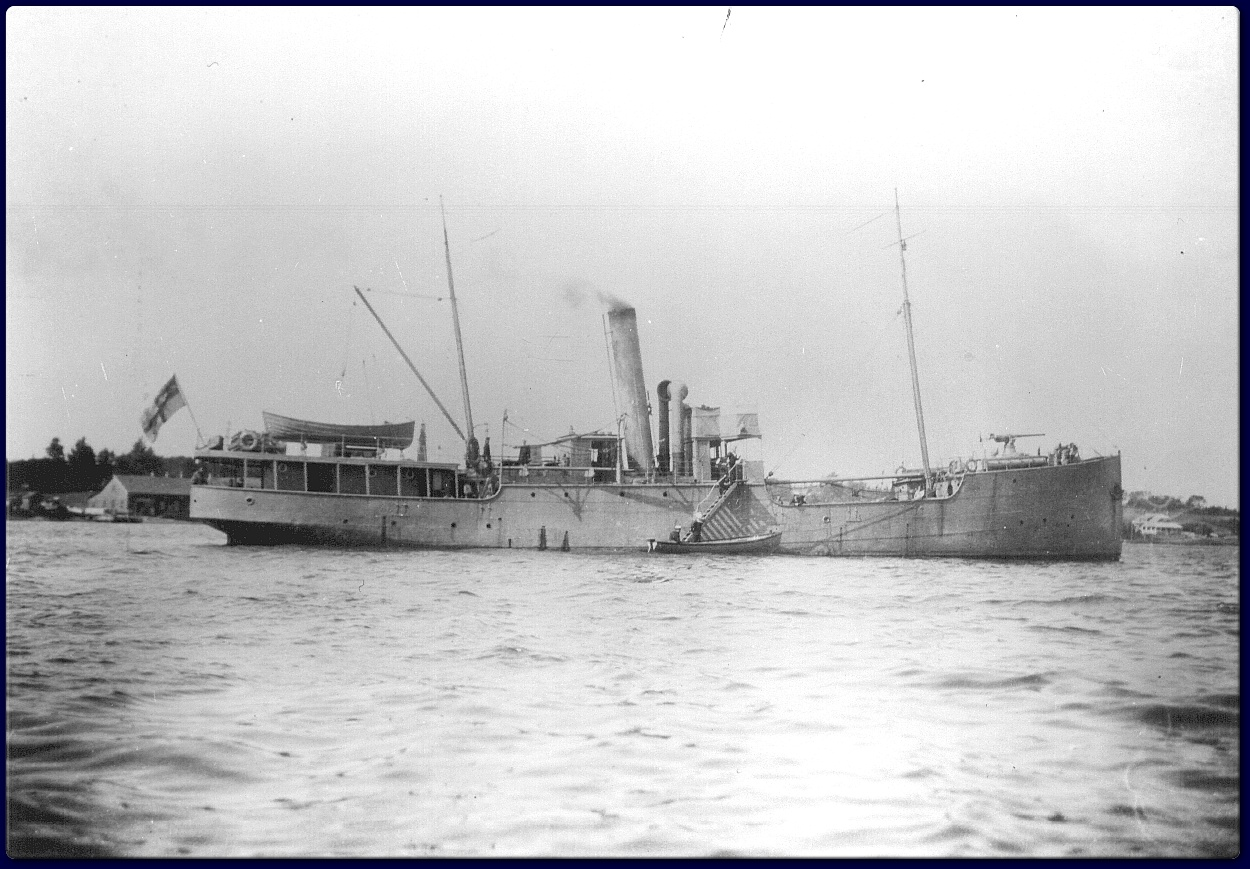
- HMCS Laurentian, with the ship's 12-pounder gun visible forward.

History
- Name: King Edward
- Owner: James Holliday (1902–1911); A.C.& G.D.Davie (1911–1913); G.T.Davie & Sons (1913–1915); Canada Steamship Lines (1915–1921)
- Builder: Cook, Welton & Gemmell, Hull
- Launched: 15 March 1902
- Completed: 13 May 1902
- Renamed: Laurentian, 1911
- Fate: Transferred to Royal Canadian Navy, 1917

Canada
- Name: Laurentian
- Acquired: 1917
- Commissioned: 1 May 1917
- Decommissioned: January 1919
- Fate: Transferred to Department of Marine and Fisheries 1919, scrapped 1947

General characteristics
- Type: Patrol vessel
- Tonnage: 355 GRT
- Length: 149 ft (45 m)
- Beam: 24 ft (7.3 m)
- Draught: 11 ft (3.4 m)
- Propulsion: Single screw, steam triple expansion, 84 nhp
- Speed: 11 knots (20 km/h; 13 mph)
- Armament: 1 × 12-pounder gun

HMCS Laurentian was a commissioned patrol vessel of the Royal Canadian Navy that served in the First World War and postwar until 1919. Prior to Canadian naval service, the ship was used by the Canada Customs Preventative Service. Following the war, Laurentian was transferred to the Department of Marine and Fisheries and used as a buoy tender and lighthouse supply vessel until taken out of service in 1946 and broken up for scrap in 1947.

== Description ==
Laurentian was 149 ft (45 m) long overall with a beam of 24 ft (7.3 m) and a draught of 11 ft (3.4 m). The ship had a gross register tonnage (GRT) of 355 tons and was propelled by a single screw powered by a steam triple expansion engine creating 84 nhp. This gave the vessel a maximum speed of 11 knots (20 km/h; 13 mph).

== Construction and service ==
The vessel was ordered from Cook, Welton & Gemmell in Beverley, United Kingdom. The vessel was launched as King Edward on 15 March 1902 and completed on 13 May later that year. Owned by James Holliday and registered in Hull, United Kingdom, the vessel was sold to A.C. & G.D. Davie in 1911 and registered in Quebec City. The ship was renamed Laurentian in 1911. Between 1911 and 1913, she was chartered to the Canadian Customs Preventive Service on behalf of the Department of Marine and Fisheries. In 1913, the vessel's ownership was transferred to G.T. Davie & Sons and again in 1915 to the Canada Steamship Lines.

In May 1917, Laurentian was sold to the Royal Canadian Navy and armed with a single 12-pounder gun mounted forward. The vessel was acquired after the Royal Canadian Navy expanded its auxiliary patrol force along the Atlantic coast of Canada. She served as a patrol vessel until January 1919, based out of Sydney, Nova Scotia. However, by 1918, Laurentian was no longer considered capable of operating in heavy weather. After being transferred to the Department of Marine and Fisheries, Laurentian was used as a buoy tender and lighthouse supply vessel until 1946, when she was retired, and was broken up for scrap the following year. Laurentian was scrapped by I. Goldberg at Saint John, New Brunswick.
