= Hill-class trawler =

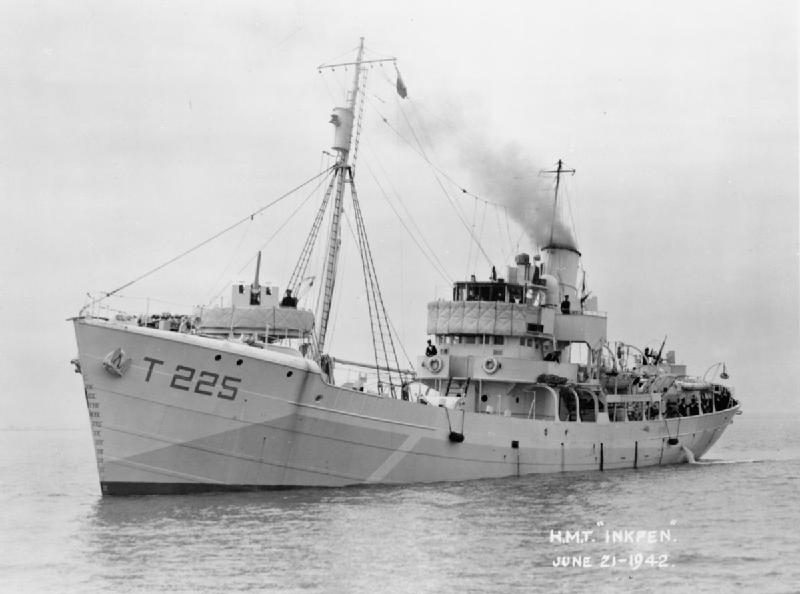
- HMS Inkpen in 1942

Class overview
- Builders: Cook, Welton & Gemmell, Beverley
- Operators: Royal Navy
- Built: 1940–1942
- In commission: 1941–1945
- Completed: 8
- Lost: 2

General characteristics
- Type: Naval trawler
- Displacement: 750 long tons (762 t)
- Length: 182 ft (55 m)
- Beam: 28 ft (8.5 m)
- Draught: 13.7 ft (4.2 m)
- Propulsion: Reciprocating engine, 1 shaft
- Speed: 12.25 knots (22.69 km/h; 14.10 mph)
- Complement: 35
- Armament: 1 × 12-pdr gun; 3 × Oerlikon 20 mm AA guns; 55 × depth charges

The Hill class of Admiralty trawlers was a small class of trawlers built for the British Royal Navy during the Second World War.

The vessels were intended for use as minesweepers and for anti-submarine warfare, and the design was based on a commercial type, the 1937 Barnett by Cook Welton and Gemmell of Beverley. The purpose of the order was to make use of specialist mercantile shipyards to provide vessels for war use by adapting commercial designs to Admiralty specifications. In 1940 the Royal Navy ordered eight such vessels from Cook Welton and Gemmell. All saw active service and two were lost in action.

== Ships ==
- Birdlip (T218), completed 11 December 1941: torpedoed, W Africa, 13 June 1944
- Bredon (T223), completed 2 April 1942: torpedoed, N Atlantic, 8 February 1943
- Butser (T219), completed 8 January 1942
- Duncton (T220), completed 27 January 1942
- Dunkery (T224), completed 23 April 1942
- Inkpen (T225), completed 23 May 1942
- Portsdown (T221), completed 19 February 1942
- Yestor (T222), completed 12 March 1942

== See also ==
- Trawlers of the Royal Navy
