= Fish-class trawler =

Class of naval trawlers

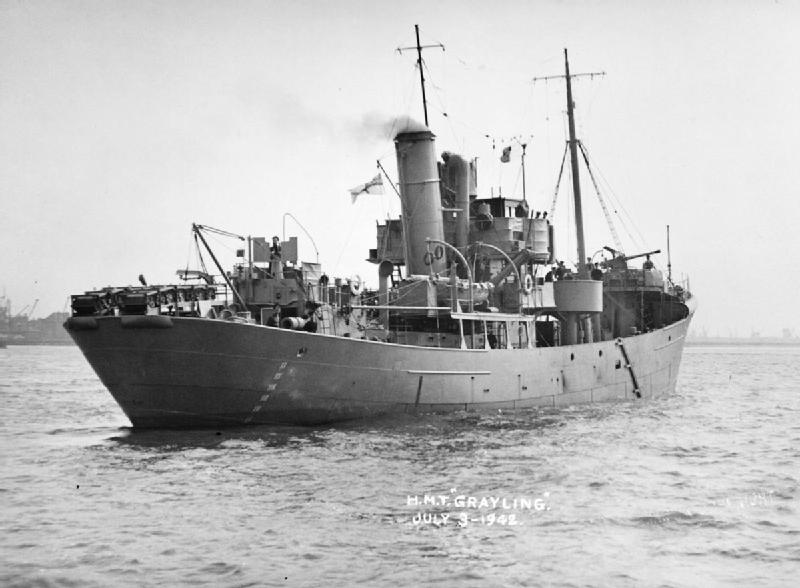
- HMS Grayling

Class overview
- Name: Fish class
- Builders: Cochrane & Sons, Selby
- Operators: Royal Navy
- Subclasses: Corncrake type minelayer
- Built: 1940–1943
- In commission: 1942–1945
- Completed: 10
- Lost: 2

General characteristics
- Type: Naval trawler
- Displacement: 590 long tons (599 t)
- Length: 161.6 ft (49.3 m)
- Beam: 25.2 ft (7.7 m)
- Draught: 13.3 ft (4.1 m)
- Propulsion: Reciprocating engine, 1 shaft
- Speed: 11.25 knots (20.84 km/h; 12.95 mph)
- Complement: 35
- Armament: 1 × 12 pdr gun; 3 × Oerlikon 20 mm AA guns; 40 × depth charges

The Fish class of Admiralty trawlers was a small class of naval trawlers built for the British Royal Navy during the Second World War.

The vessels were intended for use as minesweepers and for anti-submarine warfare, and the design was based on a commercial type, the 1929 Gulfoss by Cochrane & Sons, of Selby. The purpose of the order was to make use of specialist mercantile shipyards to provide vessels for war use by adapting commercial designs to Admiralty specifications.

In 1940 the Royal Navy ordered ten such vessels from Cochrane. All saw active service, and two were lost in incidents.

== Corncrake-type minelayer ==
Two vessels, Mackerel and Turbot, were converted for use as controlled minelayers while still under construction. Upon completion they were renamed Corncrake and Redshank, respectively.

== Ships ==
| Name | Hull number | Built | Fate | Notes |
|---|---|---|---|---|
| Bonito | T231 | 15 February 1942 | | |
| Bream | T306 | 30 March 1943 | | |
| Corncrake (ex Mackerel) | M82 | 7 December 1942 | Foundered due to weather 25 January 1943 in the North Atlantic | Corncrake-type minelayer |
| Grayling | T243 | 4 July 1942 | | |
| HMS Grilse | T368 | 29 June 1943 | | |
| Herring | T307 | 10 April 1943 | Lost 22 April 1943 in North Sea collision | Corncrake-type minelayer |
| Mullet | T311 | 14 November 1942 | | |
| Pollock | T347 | 20 July 1943 | | |
| Redshank (ex Turbot) | M31 | 10 January 1943 | | |
| Whiting | T232 | 9 March 1942 | | |

== See also ==
- Trawlers of the Royal Navy
