= Cook, Welton & Gemmell =

Former English shipbuilder

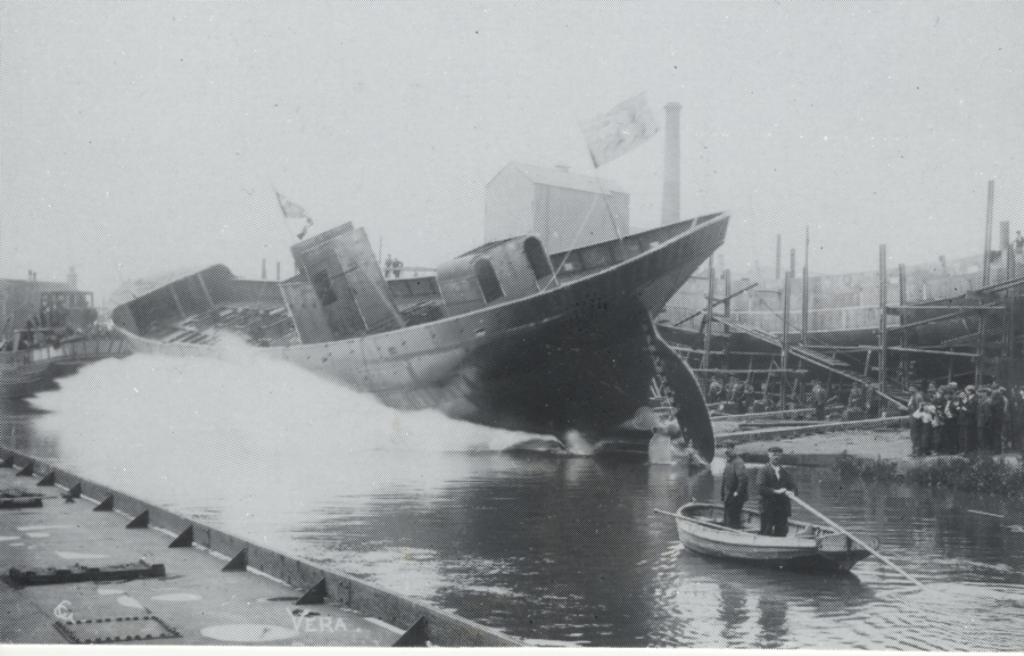
- Launch of the Vera at Cook, Welton & Gemmell's Grovehill shipyard, 1907
- Type: Private company
- Industry: Shipbuilding
- Founded: 1883 in Kingston upon Hull
- Defunct: 1963
- Fate: Taken over and eventually closed
- Successors: Charles D. Holmes & Co; Drypool Group Ltd; Phoenix Shipbuilders Ltd
- Headquarters: Beverley, Yorkshire, UK
- Products: Trawlers and other small ships
- Number of employees: 650 (1954)

Cook, Welton & Gemmell was a shipbuilder based in Hull and Beverley, East Riding of Yorkshire. England. They built trawlers and other small ships.

== History ==
=== Founding and move to Beverley ===
The firm was founded in 1883 on South Bridge Road, Hull, on the Humber bank. The founding partners were William James Cook, Charles Keen Welton and William Gemmell. In 1901–1902 the business moved nine miles up the River Hull to a new yard at Grovehill, Beverley purchased from Cochrane, Hamilton & Cooper. The yard had been founded by Andrew Cochrane in 1884. It was one of the few shipyards that launched broadside.

=== Prosperity and decline ===
The new yard initially produced trawlers and whalers with dredging of the River Hull allowing larger ships to be built. During both world wars it built large numbers of ships such as minesweepers and anti-submarine trawlers for the Royal Navy. Between the wars it consolidated its reputation as a builder of high quality trawlers and continued to prosper into the 1950s. In 1954 the shipyard employed 650 workers and built 15 vessels (including three minesweepers, four trawlers, and a tug), but by 1960 the workforce had declined to 600 and after struggling to find orders Cook, Welton & Gemmell built their last ship in 1962 and went into voluntary liquidation in 1963.

=== Changes of ownership ===
The firm was taken over by Charles D. Holmes & Co in March 1963 and the company name changed to Beverley Shipbuilding and Engineering Co Ltd. C D Holmes was subsequently taken over in July 1973 by Drypool Group, which in turn went into liquidation in 1975. The yard was then taken over by Whitby Shipyard Ltd on 1 July 1976. That company changed its name to Phoenix Shipbuilders Ltd in December 1976 and had a receiver appointed in May 1977, resulting in the closure of the Beverley yard with nearly 180 redundancies. The site reverted to the ground landlords, Beverley Borough Council, and was later developed as the Acorn Industrial Estate.

== Ships built by Cook, Welton & Gemmell ==
=== Naval vessels ===
Isles-class trawlers

- Ailsa Craig (T377), 1943
- Annet (T341), 1943
- Arran (T06), 1941
- Balta (T50), 1941
- Benbecula (T379), 1944
- Bern (T294), 1942
- Blackbird (M15), 1943
- Bressay (T214), 1942
- Brora (T99), 1941
- Bruray (T236), 1942
- Bryher (T350), 1943
- Calvay (T383), 1944
- Colsay (T384), 1944
- Crowlin (T380), 1944
- Dabchick (M22), 1943
- Egilsay (T215), 1942
- Ensay (T216), 1942
- Farne (T353), 1943
- Flatholm (T354), 1943
- Fuday (T385), 1944
- Ganilly (T367), 1943
- Gulland (T239), 1943
- Gweal (T246), 1942
- Hannaray (T389), 1944
- Harris (T386), 1944
- Hascosay (T390), 1944
- Hayling (T271), 1942
- Hildasay (T173), 1941
- Hoxa (T16), 1941
- Hoy (T114), 1941
- Inchcolm (T18), 1941
- Killegray (T174), 1941
- Kittern (T382), 1943
- Lindisfarne (T361), 1943
- Lundy (T272), 1943
- Mewstone (T374), 1943
- Minalto (T362), 1943
- Mull (T110), 1941
- Neave (T247), 1942
- Pladda (T144), 1941
- Rosevean (T363), 1943
- Sandray (T424), 1944
- Scalpay (T237), 1942
- Scaravay (J425), 1945
- Scarba (T175), 1941
- Sheppey (T292), 1942
- Shillay (T426), 1945
- Skokholm (T376), 1943
- Stonechat (M25), 1944
- Sursay (T427), 1945
- Tahay (T452), 1945
- Tocogay (T451), 1945
- Trodday (T431), 1945
- Ulva (T248), 1942
- Vaceasay (T432), 1945
- Vallay (T434), 1945
- Whalsay (T293), 1942
- Whitethroat (M03), 1944
- Wiay (T441), 1945

Dance-class trawlers

- Gavotte (T115), 1940
- Hornpipe (T120), 1940

Tree-class trawlers

- Birch (T93), 1940
- Blackthorn (T100), 1940

Shakespearian-class trawlers

- Hamlet (T167), 1940
- Horatio (T153), 1941
- Juliet (T136), 1941
- Laertes (T137), 1941

Hill-class trawlers

- Birdlip (T218), 1941
- Bredon (T223), 1942
- Butser (T219), 1942
- Duncton (T220), 1942
- Dunkery (T224), 1942
- Inkpen (T225), 1942
- Portsdown (T221), 1942
- Yes Tor (T222), 1942

Military-class trawlers

- Bombardier (T304), 1943
- Coldstreamer (T337), 1943
- Fusilier (T305), 1943
- Grenadier (T334), 1943
- Guardsman (T393), 1944
- Home Guard (T394), 1944
- Lancer (T335), 1943
- Royal Marine (T395), 1944
- Sapper (T336), 1942

ASW trawlers requisitioned before completion

- Vizalma (FY286), 1940

Flower-class corvettes

- Azalea (K25), 1941
- Begonia (K66), 1941

Ton-class minesweepers

- Brinton (M1114), 1954
- Bronington (M1115), 1954
- Chilton (M1215), 1958
- Darlaston (M1127), 1954
- Dilston (M1142), 1955
- Hazleton (M1142), 1954
- Hexton (M1143), 1955
- Penston (M1169), 1955
- Picton (M1170), 1956
- Wilkieston (M1192), 1957

Castle-class trawlers

Ordered during First World War but completed after the war as commercial vessels

- Andrew Anderson (FY4405), 1920
- Andrew Apsley (FY4298), 1919
- Charles Antram (FY4401), 1920
- Charles Boyes (FY3593), 1918
- Dominick Addison (FY4296), 1919
- Egilias Akerman (FY4294), 1919
- Frederick Bush (FY3594), 1918
- George Adgell (FY4402), 1920
- George Aiken (FY4291), 1920
- George Cochran (FY3721), 1918
- Griffith Griffith (FY3780), 1919
- Isaac Arthan (FY4297), 1920
- John Aikenhead (FY4292), 1919
- John Ashley (FY4293), 1919
- John Baptish (FY3596), 1918
- John Bateman (FY3599), 1918
- John Bomkworth (FY3597), 1918
- John Gauntlet (FY3779), 1919
- John Graham (FY3778), 1919
- John Gulipster (FY3782), 1919
- Joseph Barratt (FY3586), 1918
- Joseph Button (FY3584), 1918
- Joshua Arabin (FY4299), 1919
- Michael Griffith (FY3781), 1919
- Patrick Bowe (FY3591), 1918
- Peter Blumberry (FY3583), 1918
- Philip Godby (FY3783), 1919
- Phineas Beard (FY3588), 1918
- Richard Bacon (FY3587), 1918
- Richard Crofts (FY3720), 1918
- Robert Bowen (FY3595), 1918
- Thomas Adney (FY4295), 1919
- Thomas Alexander (FY4404), 1920
- Thomas Allen (FY4403), 1920
- Thomas Altoft (FY4300), 1920
- Thomas Bartlett (FY3598), 1918
- Thomas Booth (FY3592), 1918
- Thomas Boudige (FY4406), 1920
- Thomas Connolly (FY3589), 1918
- William Bell (FY3590), 1918
- William Brady (FY3585), 1918
- William Browis (FY3582), 1918
- William Caldwell (FY3719), 1918
- William Darnold (FY3722), 1918

Castle-class trawlers (non-standard)

- George Aunger (FY3611), 1918
- Hugh Black (FY3602), 1917
- James Berry (FY3603), 1917
- John Anderson (FY3610), 1917
- John Brennan (FY3609), 1918
- John Brice (FY3608), 1918
- John Brooker (FY3605), 1917
- John Burlingham (FY3600), 1917
- Richard Bagley (FY3604), 1917
- Robert Betson (FY3601), 1917
- Thomas Blackthorn (FY3606), 1917
- Thomas Buckley (FY3607), 1917

Mersey-class trawlers (non-standard)

- John Appleby (FY3612), 1917
- John Arthur (FY3613), 1917

Kil-class patrol gunboats

- Kilchattan (FY4013), 1918
- Kilchvan (FY4014), 1918
- Kilclief (FY4015), 1918
- Kilclogher (FY4016), 1918

War Department vessels

- Landsdowne, 1896
- Moore, 1904
- Osprey, 1895
- Sir Redvers Buller, 1895

=== Fishing vessels ===
Fishing trawlers

Port letter and number after name with year of building

- Aby (FD138), 1945
- Abydos (GY73), 1905
- Achroite (H81), 1934
- Active (H191), 1892
- Admiral Hawke (H476), 1937
- Advanturine (H197), 1930
- Adventure (H1500), 1886
- Akurey (RE95), 1947
- Alamein (H123), 1950
- Albatross, 1895
- Alberta, 1910
- Alderney (H273), 1895
- Alert (H344), 1896
- Alexandra (GY60), 1905
- Alexandrite (H7), 1933
- Alfred-Edith (O35), 1908
- Almandine (H415), 1932
- Amandine (H401), 1932
- Amethyst (H455), 1928
- Andalusite (H90), 1924
- Andradite (H176), 1925
- Andradite (H26), 1934
- Angelo (H890), 1906
- Anglia (GY254), 1890
- Angus (H362), 1930
- Anson (GY47), 1905
- Aquamarine (H388), 1928
- Arab (H516), 1933
- Aracari (GY355), 1908
- Aragonite (H79), 1934
- Arctic Cavalier (H204), 1960
- Arctic Corsair (H320), 1960
- Arctic Hunter (H17), 1929
- Arctic Ranger (H155), 1957
- Arctic Vandal (H344), 1961
- Argonaut (H291), 1895
- Ariadne (H293), 1895
- Ariel (H1473), 1885
- Ariel (H843), 1905
- Arkwright (H314), 1930
- Artois (LR4049), 1947
- Arum (CTA115), 1960
- Asama (CF62), 1919
- Athelstan (GY648), 1911
- Athenian (GY357), 1903
- Athenian (GY357), 1919
- Auckland (H441), 1899
- Aucuba (GY117), 1906
- Aunis (LR4042), 1946
- Avanturine (H197), 1930
- Axinite (H183), 1925
- Balthasar (H405), 1931
- Barbados (GY71), 1905
- Bardolph (H296), 1911
- Basque (H521), 1933
- Bassanio (H732), 1904
- Bassethound (H151), 1891
- Basuto (H401), 1931
- Belovar (GY109), 1899
- Belovar (GY109), 1906
- Bempton (H19), 1914
- Benella (H132), 1958
- Bengal (GY108), 1905
- Bengal (H287), 1896
- Bermuda (GY56), 1905
- Bernicia (GY1215), 1901
- Beverlac (H72), 1929
- Bianca (H845), 1905
- Birch (GY677), 1912
- Blakkur (GY378), 1931
- Blanche (H928), 1907
- Bloodhound (H89), 1890
- Boadicea (H17), 1899
- Boarhound (H125), 1891
- Borella (H240), 1946
- Borneo (GY115), 1905
- Boston Seafire (H584), 1948
- Bournemouth (H17), 1887
- Breughel (O299), 1946
- Breughel (O299), 1956
- Brisbane (GY1281), 1903
- Britannia (H1506), 1886
- British Empire (H313), 1896
- British Empire (H908), 1906
- Briton (H538), 1901
- Brontes (H41), 1934
- Broxholme (H208), 1892
- Brucella (H291), 1953
- Buckhound (H143), 1891
- Buffalo (GY52), 1905
- Bulby (FD147), 1946
- Bull Dog (H192), 1892
- Bunsen (H269), 1926
- Butterfly (H393), 1898
- Cadet (H210), 1914
- Cairo (H550), 1902
- Calphurnia (GY495), 1909
- Cambodia (GY597), 1911
- Cambria (GY371), 1891
- Cantatrice (GY469), 1915
- Cape Adair (H119), 1956
- Cape Barracouta (H267), 1930
- Cape Columbia (H118 ), 1956
- Cape Comorin (H291), 1936
- Cape Otranto (H227), 1961
- Cape Trafalgar (H59), 1957
- Capel (H17), 1929
- Capetown (H998), 1908
- Cariama (GY4), 1904
- Carieda (GY908), 1913
- Cassandra (H848), 1905
- Cayton Bay (H72), 1949
- Celestial Empire (H371), 1897
- Ceresio (H447), 1915
- Ceylon (H103), 1890
- Chalcedoney (H392), 1928
- Chanticleer (H254), 1894
- Chieftain (H847), 1905
- Chindwin (H34), 1887
- Christopher (H207), 1911
- Chrysolite (H409), 1899
- City of Birmingham (H162), 1891
- City of Exeter (H256), 1894
- City Of Gloucester (H298), 1895
- City of Hull (H396), 1898
- City of London (FD201), 1901
- City of Wakefield (H132), 1891
- Cleopatra (H46), 1899
- Collingwood (GY1229), 1902
- Commander Naismith (H385), 1915
- Comrade (H348), 1896
- Condor (GY85), 1905
- Congo (GY274), 1897
- Consort (GY498), 1909
- Corientes (GY552), 1910
- Cornelia (H257), 1894
- Cornelian (H506), 1900
- Corythaix (GY553), 1910
- Councillor (H337), 1896
- Courser (GY1287), 1904
- Courser (GY79), 1905
- Courtier (GY564), 1910
- Courtland (GY35), 1904
- Crusader (H5), 1904
- Crystal (H303), 1895
- Cuckoo (H309), 1896
- Curlew (H274), 1895
- Cyprus (H198), 1892
- Cyrano (GY1203), 1900
- Dale Castle (H195), 1892
- Dane (GY403), 1897
- Dane (H227), 1911
- Davy (H322), 1936
- De la Pole (H377), 1911
- Deerhound (H81), 1889
- Defender (GY1279), 1903
- Delhi (H742), 1903
- Dervish (H8), 1934
- Desdemona (H535), 1901
- Desideratum (H154), 1891
- Destinn (GY307), 1914
- Disa (CTA85), 1959
- Dogberry (H46), 1909
- Dogger Bank (H47), 1888
- Donalda (GY149), 1914
- Dorcas (H925), 1906
- Douglas (H375), 1897
- Douro (GY310), 1897
- Dovey (GY425), 1897
- Dromio (H102), 1910
- Dromio (H94), 1929
- Duchess of York (H227), 1893
- Duke Of Wellington (H388), 1898
- Duke Of York (H224), 1893
- Durban (H378), 1897
- Earl Essex (GY48), 1914
- Earl Hereford (GY147), 1906
- Earl Howard (GY332), 1914
- Earl Kitchener (H345), 1915
- Earl Lennox (GY367), 1914
- Eastward Ho (H415), 1898
- Edmond René, 1947
- Edward B Cargill (H412), 1898
- Edward Robson (H73), 1889
- Edwardian (GY328), 1930
- Edwardian (GY704), 1912
- Egypt (H126), 1890
- Eirikur Raudi (RE23), 1925
- Electra (H1498), 1886
- Electra (H661), 1904
- Elk (GY1235), 1902
- Ella Hewett (LO47), 1953
- Embassy (GY469), 1928
- Emperor (H741), 1903
- Emu (H516), 1900
- Encore (H523), 1900
- Endymion (H519), 1900
- Erin (H757), 1903
- Ermine (H753), 1903
- Eros (GY284), 1907
- Eros (H768), 1903
- Escallonia (GY631), 1911
- Esmeralda (H747), 1903
- Euclase (H384), 1931
- Eudocia (H130), 1891
- Excelsior (H70), 1889
- Falcon (H321), 1896
- Faraday (H366), 1897
- Farnella (H41), 1948
- Filey (H8), 1914
- Flandre (GY598), 1915
- Fleming (H3), 1929
- Florence (H265), 1894
- Fortuna (GY140), 1906
- Forward (H407), 1898
- Forward Ho (H331), 1914
- Foxhound (H75), 1889
- Franklin (H841), 1905
- Fraser (H951), 1907
- Freesia (GY633), 1911
- Fulmar (H25), 1899
- Fylkir (RE161), 1947
- Fylkir (RE171), 1958
- Gabir (GY497), 1909
- Gadra (GY485), 1909
- Galleon (GY269), 1930
- Galvani (H88), 1929
- Gambri (GY99), 1929
- Gambri (GY992), 1916
- Game Cock (H205), 1892
- Gardar Thorsteinsson (GK3), 1948
- Garu (GY644), 1911
- Gaul (H761), 1904
- Gazehound (SD87), 1891
- Geir (RE241), 1947
- Gelsina (GY869), 1916
- General Gordon (H3), 1899
- General Roberts (H38), 1888
- George (H216), 1893
- George Irvin (CTA138), 1953
- Gibraltar (H1000), 1908
- Gibraltar (H119), 1890
- Godanes (NK105), 1947
- Gonzalo (H892), 1906
- Good Hope (H722), 1903
- Good Luck (H497), 1912
- Goth (H211), 1925
- Gozo (H545), 1902
- Graphic (H78), 1889
- Great Admiral (GY361), 1908
- Grebe (GY219), 1906
- Grecian (GY15), 1896
- Grecian Empire (H479), 1899
- Greyhound (H84), 1889
- Grimsby, 1901
- Gudmunder Juni (IS20), 1925
- Guernsey (H271), 1895
- Hannes Radherra (RE268), 1926
- Harrier (H342), 1896
- Hatsuse (CF61), 1919
- Hawk (H389), 1898
- Hawthorn (GY1228), 1902
- Helios (GY784), 1903
- Helvetia (GY767), 1898
- Hene Castle (H414), 1898
- Hercules (H771), 1903
- Hero (H886), 1906
- Heron (H135), 1891
- Heron (H1489), 1886
- Hirose (CF4), 1920
- Honoria (H325), 1896
- Hornsea (H485), 1899
- Horus (GY691), 1899
- Houbara (GY650), 1911
- Howe (GY177), 1930
- Hvalfell (RE282), 1947
- Iago (H963), 1907
- Ilustra (GY127), 1914
- Imperial Queen (H357), 1897
- Imperialist (H143), 1924
- Imperialist (H143), 1924
- Indian Empire (H 369), 1897
- Industria (H14), 1887
- Invicta (GY146), 1906
- Iolanthe (H328), 1896
- Iona (H709), 1904
- Ireland (H351), 1897
- Irrawaddy (H1479), 1885
- Isborg (IS250), 1947
- Isernia (GY164), 1899
- Isis (GY75), 1899
- Italia Caesar (GY442), 1937
- Jacamar (GY649), 1911
- Jacinth (H340), 1896
- Jackdaw (H300), 1895
- Jacques Colin (B2366), 1946
- Jamaica (H317), 1896
- James Carruthers (GY762), 1912
- Jeria, 1899
- Jeria (GY224), 1930
- Jeria (GY985), 1916
- Jessica (H870), 1906
- Joannes Patursson, 1947
- Johannesburg (H711), 1903
- John Sherburn (H644), 1902
- Jon Forseti (RE108), 1948
- Josena (FD150), 1957
- Josena (H207), 1945
- Joseph Conrad (H161), 1957
- Juliet (H880), 1906
- K'Opanes (H502), 1930
- Kastoria (GY1017), 1917
- Kennymore (GY38), 1914
- Kestrel (H318), 1896
- Khartoum (H472), 1899
- King Edward VII (H530), 1901
- Kings Grey (GY486), 1915
- Kingston Agate (H489), 1937
- Kingston Alalite (H538), 1933
- Kingston Amber (H326), 1960
- Kingston Andalusite (H133), 1934
- Kingston Beryl (H499), 1928
- Kingston Cairngorm (H175), 1935
- Kingston Cameo (H272), 1936
- Kingston Ceylonite (H173), 1935
- Kingston Chrysoberyl (H177), 1935
- Kingston Chrysolite (H169), 1935
- Kingston Coral (H241), 1930
- Kingston Coral (H241), 1936
- Kingston Cornelian (H75), 1934
- Kingston Crystal (H281), 1936
- Kingston Cyanite (H237), 1930
- Kingston Cyanite (H254), 1936
- Kingston Diamond (H294), 1926
- Kingston Emerald, 1927
- Kingston Emerald (H49), 1954
- Kingston Galena (H31), 1934
- Kingston Garnet (H106), 1949
- Kingston Garnet (H323), 1927
- Kingston Jacinth (H198), 1951
- Kingston Jacinth (H44), 1929
- Kingston Jade (H149), 1950
- Kingston Jasper (H494), 1928
- Kingston Olivine (H209), 1930
- Kingston Onyx (H140), 1950
- Kingston Onyx (H365), 1927
- Kingston Pearl (H127), 1958
- Kingston Pearl (H296), 1926
- Kingston Peridot (H55), 1929
- Kingston Peridot (H591), 1948
- Kingston Sapphire (H39), 1929
- Kingston Topaz (H145), 1927
- Kingston Turquoise (H45), 1929
- Kingston Turquoise (H50), 1955
- Kingston Zircon (H108), 1949
- Kingsway (GY37), 1905
- Kirkella (H209), 1952
- Kong Frederik III (F145), 1909
- Kyoto (CF65), 1920
- La Champagne (B2758), 1901
- La Flandre, 1902
- Labore Et Honore (H217), 1893
- Labrador (H246), 1894
- Laconia (GY1173), 1900
- Lady Adelaide (H4), 1933
- Lady Beryl (H222), 1935
- Lady Beryl (H283), 1925
- Lady Beryl (H283), 1925
- Lady Eleanor (H50), 1929
- Lady Enid (H172), 1929
- Lady Hogarth (H479), 1937
- Lady Jeanette (H466), 1937
- Lady Lavinia (H160), 1935
- Lady Lilian (H229), 1939
- Lady Lillian (H467), 1933
- Lady Madeleine (H243), 1939
- Lady Madeleine (H279), 1926
- Lady Madeline (H85), 1934
- Lady Margot (H188), 1929
- Lady Philomena (H230), 1936
- Lady Rachael (H457), 1928
- Lady Rosemary (H442), 1928
- Lady Rosemary (H477), 1928
- Lady Shirley (H464), 1937
- Ladybird (H524), 1901
- Ladysmith (H726), 1903
- Lancella (H290), 1953
- Lark (H1493), 1886
- Lark (H359), 1897
- Leonato (H41), 1909
- Leonidas (H267), 1930
- Linnet (H1495), 1886
- Linnet (H363), 1897
- Livingstone (H496), 1900
- Loch Inver (H195), 1930
- Loch Leven (A379), 1928
- Loch Seaforth (H529), 1933
- Lord Bradbury (H251), 1925
- Lord C Beresford (H341), 1896
- Lord Chancellor (H50), 1888
- Lord Fisher (H264), 1914
- Lord Jellicoe (H228), 1962
- Lord Nelson (H345), 1897
- Lord Rosebery (H537), 1901
- Lord Salisbury (H702), 1902
- Lord Selborne (GY1058), 1917
- Lord St Vincent (H261), 1962
- Lord Wolseley (H263), 1904
- Lorella (H455), 1947
- Lorenzo (H518), 1933
- Lorinda (FD182), 1928
- Loroone (GY830), 1913
- Louis Botha (GY896), 1916
- Loyal (GY501), 1929
- Lucknow (H739), 1903
- Lundy (H993), 1908
- Lycurgus (H93), 1890
- Lysander (H800), 1903
- Macfarlane (H997), 1908
- Mackenzie (H349), 1911
- Mackenzie (H691), 1902
- Mafeking (H716), 1903
- Magpie (H311), 1896
- Malabar (H754), 1903
- Mandalay (H105), 1890
- Marbella (H52), 1955
- Marconi (H777), 1903
- Margaret Wicks (FD265), 1948
- Marguerite (H288), 1895
- Martaban (H115), 1890
- Martaban (H136), 1891
- Marthe (O43), 1913
- Marz (GY182), 1929
- Mastiff (H164), 1891
- Mauritius (H547), 1902
- Mayfly (H477), 1899
- Median (GY384), 1908
- Melbourne (H200), 1892
- Mercury (H518), 1900
- Merrie Islington (H183), 1891
- Mikado (H823), 1905
- Minerva (H520), 1900
- Minoru (GY484), 1909
- Miranda (H975), 1906
- Mizpah (H56), 1888
- Mohican (H391), 1931
- Monarch (H331), 1896
- Monimia (GY734), 1912
- Monimia (H43), 1929
- Montreal (H211), 1893
- Moravia (GY1018), 1916
- Myna (H379), 1912
- Narberth Castle (H427), 1898
- Narval (O141), 1910
- Navena (FD149), 1945
- Negro (H406), 1932
- Neptune (O126), 1901
- Neptunia (H2166), 1926
- Nerissa (H879), 1906
- Newington (H33), 1899
- Night Hawk (GY643), 1911
- Nil Desperandum (H66), 1889
- Ninus (GY700), 1912
- Nodzu (CF1), 1920
- Nolsoyar Pall (TN10), 1947
- Norman (GY579), 1894
- Norman (H249), 1911
- Norman (H717), 1902
- Norse (H219), 1925
- Norse (H348), 1930
- North Sea (H147), 1891
- Northella (H98), 1958
- Northumbria (GY169), 1906
- Northward Ho (H455), 1899
- Novelli (GY889), 1915
- Oberon (H851), 1905
- Octavia (H876), 1906
- Octavia (H886), 1905
- Oliver Cromwell (H490), 1899
- Olympia (GY1080), 1917
- Olympia (GY62), 1905
- Ophir (H725), 1902
- Orizaba (GY356), 1908
- Osprey, 1893
- Ostrich (H729), 1903
- Ostrich (H74), 1899
- Othello (H956), 1907
- Otterhound (H92), 1890
- Ottilie (GY144), 1914
- Pamela (H283), 1911
- Parthian (GY646), 1911
- Pavlova (GY716), 1912
- Pelican (H285), 1895
- Pelton (H288), 1925
- Penelope (H295), 1895
- Penguin (H284), 1895
- Pentland Firth (H123), 1934
- Pericles (H131), 1910
- Persian Empire (H476), 1899
- Petrel (H222), 1893
- Pharos (GY1211), 1900
- Philip Maxted (H69), 1889
- Phoebe (H881), 1906
- Picador (H520), 1933
- Pict (H250), 1925
- Picton Castle (H194), 1892
- Plutarch (H724), 1903
- Pointer (H513), 1900
- Portia (H280), 1895
- Premier (H344), 1896
- Pretoria (H701), 1902
- Pretoria (GY180), 1906
- Prime Minister (H48), 1888
- Prince Charles (H77), 1957
- Prince Charles (H85), 1949
- Prince Consort (H106), 1890
- Prince of Wales (H136), 1891
- Prince Philip (H32), 1948
- Princess Elizabeth (H135), 1950
- Princess Louise (H837), 1905
- Princess Marie-José (H242), 1915
- Princess Victoria (H766), 1903
- Puritan (H497), 1899
- Pyrope (H424), 1932
- Quail (GY215), 1906
- Quebec (H199), 1892
- Queen (GY1197), 1900
- Queen Alexandra (H530), 1901
- Queensland (H212), 1893
- Quercia (GY680), 1912
- Rado (GY1272), 1903
- Raetia (GY707), 1912
- Ralco (GY663), 1912
- Rameses (GY715), 1894
- Rangoon (H45), 1888
- Rayon d'Or (GY719), 1912
- Rebono (GY731), 1912
- Recolo (GY668), 1912
- Recordia (H352), 1897
- Recordo (GY507), 1910
- Recto (GY16), 1904
- Refino (GY1271), 1903
- Refundo (GY1063), 1917
- Regal (GY245), 1930
- Reindeer (GY1236), 1902
- Relevo (GY670), 1912
- Remarko (GY228), 1914
- Renco (GY512), 1910
- Renovo (GY23), 1904
- Renown (GY281), 1907
- Reporto (GY380), 1908
- Repro (GY510), 1910
- Resolute (H52), 1888
- Resono (GY508), 1910
- Resparko (GY926), 1916
- Responso (GY666), 1912
- Retriever (H180), 1891
- Revello (GY373), 1908
- Revello (GY373), 1908
- Reverto (GY104), 1904
- Rhodesia (H443), 1899
- Riano (GY181), 1906
- Riby (GY594), 1910
- Richard Simpson (H91), 1890
- Rifsnes (H451), 1932
- Rigoletto (GY185), 1906
- Rio Tejo, 1910
- Rivière (GY893), 1916
- Rodull (GK518), 1948
- Roman (H948), 1907
- Roman Empire (H431), 1898
- Romanoff (GY1204), 1900
- Rononia (GY865), 1913
- Rosa Maris (FD43), 1920
- Rosa Maris (H248), 1920
- Rosalind (H839), 1905
- Ross (GY329), 1930
- Rowsley (GY751), 1912
- Royalist (H428), 1898
- Royalist (LO50), 1960
- Royallieu (GY1191), 1900
- Royalo (GY941), 1916
- Rubens (O297), 1946
- Rugby (GY1188), 1900
- Rugby (GY994), 1916
- Russell (GY192), 1906
- Rylston (H343), 1930
- Sabrina (H346), 1897
- Salacon (GY55), 1905
- Salvini (GY892), 1916
- Samuel Hewett (LO117), 1956
- San Pedro, 1890
- Sandringham (GY59), 1905
- Sanson (GY295), 1907
- Sargon (GY858), 1913
- Sarpedon (GY984), 1916
- Satyrion (GY197), 1899
- Scarron (GY935), 1913
- Scotland (H348), 1897
- Sea Horse (H533), 1901
- Sea King (H540), 1901
- Sea Monarch (H411), 1915
- Sea Sweeper (H409), 1915
- Seaward Ho (H312), 1915
- Seddon (GY991), 1916
- Senator (GY61), 1905
- Serapion (GY1154), 1899
- Seriema (GY504), 1909
- Sethon (GY928), 1916
- Seti (GY72), 1896
- Setter (H163), 1891
- Shamrock (H483), 1899
- Sheldon (GY696), 1912
- Sheraton (GY230), 1907
- Siberite (H378), 1931
- Sicyon (GY163), 1906
- Silanion (GY1179), 1900
- Silanion (GY246), 1930
- Silicia (GY809), 1913
- Simerson (GY960), 1913
- Singapore (H505), 1899
- Sir Albert Rollit (H55), 1888
- Sisapon (GY42), 1905
- Sisapon (GY493), 1928
- Skuli Fogeti (RE144), 1920
- Skuli Magnusson (RE202), 1948
- Sledmere (H196), 1892
- Sleuth Hound (H114), 1890
- Solon (GY326), 1896
- Solon (GY714), 1912
- Solway Firth (H107), 1929
- Somerset Maugham (H329), 1960
- Sophron (GY1270), 1903
- Sophron (GY58), 1899
- Southcoates (H536), 1901
- Southella (H303), 1946
- Souvenir, 1947
- Sparta (H140), 1891
- Spartan (GY520), 1893
- Springfield (H228), 1893
- St Apollo (H351), 1939
- St Achilleus (H127), 1934
- St Alcuin (H125), 1950
- St Alexandre (H373), 1928
- St Amandus (H505), 1933
- St Andronicus (H536), 1933
- St Apollo (H592), 1948
- St Arcadius (H482), 1933
- St Attalus (H48), 1934
- St Botolph (H188), 1946
- St Britwin (H124), 1950
- St Cathan (H353), 1936
- St Celestin (H192), 1925
- St Celestin (H232), 1952
- St Chad (H20), 1955
- St Clair (H803), 1903
- St Crispin (H399), 1946
- St Delphine (H380), 1928
- St Dominic (H116), 1958
- St Donats (H35), 1924
- St Elstan (H484), 1937
- St Gatien (H189), 1925
- St Gerontius (H350), 1961
- St Goran (H356), 1936
- St Honorious (H66), 1929
- St Hubert (H493), 1916
- St Irene (H472), 1928
- St Ives (H11), 1908
- St Joan (H456), 1928
- St John (H254), 1946
- St Johns (H81), 1910
- St Just (H320), 1930
- St Kenan (H360), 1936
- St Kilda (H355), 1904
- St Leander (H420), 1928
- St Leger (H178), 1951
- St Loman (H156), 1957
- St Loman (H381), 1936
- St Louis (H153), 1925
- St Lucia (H937), 1907
- St Malo (H371), 1911
- St Matthew (H284), 1946
- St Melanthe (H367), 1927
- St Michel Bernard, 1946
- St Nectan (H411), 1937
- St Nidan (H412), 1936
- St Romanus (H426), 1928
- St Rose (H492), 1928
- St Sebastian (H470), 1928
- St Vincent (H933), 1907
- St Wistan (H486), 1937
- St Zeno (H255), 1939
- Staghound (H85), 1889
- Starella (H219), 1960
- Starella (H75), 1949
- Stella Aquila (H114), 1956
- Stella Leonis (H322), 1960
- Stork (H214), 1893
- Stork (H498), 1899
- Storm Cock (H207), 1892
- Stornoway (H83), 1910
- Straton (GY208), 1899
- Strephon (GY810), 1912
- Strephon (GY852), 1898
- Stronsay (H387), 1911
- Strymon (GY912), 1899
- Sutherness (H331), 1914
- Swan (H700), 1902
- Swanella (H141), 1956
- Swanella (H42), 1948
- Sweeper (GY853), 1913
- Swift (GY674), 1892
- Sydney (H202), 1892
- Syrian (GY25), 1904
- Tanjore (H759), 1903
- Tasmania (H122), 1891
- Terrier (H171), 1891
- Tervani (GY10), 1914
- Tervani (H260), 1925
- Teuton (GY795), 1898
- Thanet (H549), 1902
- The Tetrarch (GY945), 1913
- Thomas Hamling (H6), 1904
- Thora (GY446), 1905
- Thorina (H318), 1946
- Thornella (H84), 1955
- Thornwick Bay (H226), 1935
- Thunderstone (GY907), 1913
- Thuringia (GY855), 1913
- Titan (GY1259), 1903
- Tobago (H482), 1899
- Topaz (H307), 1896
- Tor Bay (H511), 1900
- Toronto (H316), 1896
- Touraco (GY347), 1908
- Tourmaline (H290), 1926
- Trier (H153), 1910
- Trinidad (H336), 1896
- Trygon (FD221), 1908
- Tugela (H521), 1900
- Tunisian (GY205), 1906
- Tunisian (GY319), 1930
- Turquoise (H335), 1896
- Tuscan (GY82), 1905
- Tyndrum (LL375), 1902
- Undine (GY204), 1889
- Unitia (GY924), 1913
- Valeria (H305), 1895
- Valesca (GY915), 1916
- Valkyrie (H226), 1893
- Van der Weyden (O293), 1946
- Van Dyck (O298), 1950
- Van Eyck (O293), 1951
- Van Orley (O294), 1946
- Vanguard (H36), 1888
- Varanga (GY61), 1929
- Vendora (GY466), 1928
- Vera (H960), 1907
- Victoria (H96), 1890
- Victorian (GY1189), 1900
- Victrix (H428), 1936
- Viking (H451), 1899
- Vindelecia (GY954), 1913
- Vinur (GY249), 1930
- Viola (H868), 1906
- Vulture (H470), 1899
- Wallena (GY12), 1914
- Walpole (GY385), 1931
- Walter S Bailey (H546), 1902
- Walwyns Castle (H411), 1898
- War Duke (GY1037), 1917
- War Grey (GY1033), 1916
- Warland (GY819), 1912
- Warstar (GY73), 1914
- Welsbach (H277), 1930
- Wessex (GY1231), 1902
- Westella (H194), 1959
- Westray (H390), 1917
- Westray Firth (H125), 1929
- Wilberforce (H344), 1897
- William Wilberforce (H200), 1959
- Windward Ho (H692), 1902
- Wolfhound (H141), 1891
- Worsley (GY814), 1915
- Yorick (H49), 1909
- Zebedee (H62), 1889
- Zenobia (H110), 1890

Smacks

- Ariel (H1473), 1885
- Bassanio (H1432), 1885
- Eleanor Maria M (GY1036), 1885
- Magneta (H1447), 1885
- Plover (H1466), 1885
- Precursor (H1426), 1885
- Unity (H1455), 1885

Drifters

- Shields, 1901
- Vincit Qui Patitur, 1922

=== Other commercial vessels ===
Tugs

- Arcadia, 1895
- Conqueror, 1901
- Director Gerling, 1892
- Empire Dorothy, 1945
- Empire Pam, 1945
- Empire Peggy, 1945
- Englishman, 1889
- Forto, 1938
- Hereward, 1888
- Huntsman, 1902
- Irishman, 1896
- Kinsman, 1908
- Manila, 1895
- NER Number 5, 1922
- NER Number 6, 1923
- Plato, 1901
- President Ludwig, 1892
- Scotsman, 1901
- Torfrida, 1889

Humber sloops & keels

- Edith, 1893
- Rose, 1886

Cargo ships

- Empire Maybury, 1945
- Empire Mayport, 1945
- Farfield, 1921
- Hatchmere, 1921
- Mickleton, 1921
- Redesmere, 1921

Steam yachts

- Candace, 1903 - later USS Remlik (SP-157)
- Dauntless, 1901
- Frances, 1887

Pleasure boats

- Boys Own, 1938
- Yorkshire Belle, 1938
- Yorkshire Belle, 1947
- MV Vidas, 1962

Research ships

- William Scoresby, 1925 - used in the Discovery Investigations

Other vessels

- King Edward, 1902 - later HMCS Laurentian
- James Rockbreaker VII, 1938
- Whitton No 3, 1897
- Whitton No 4, 1897
- Shell Farmer, 1955
- Tetney, 1909
