= HMS Begonia (K66) =

Flower-class corvette

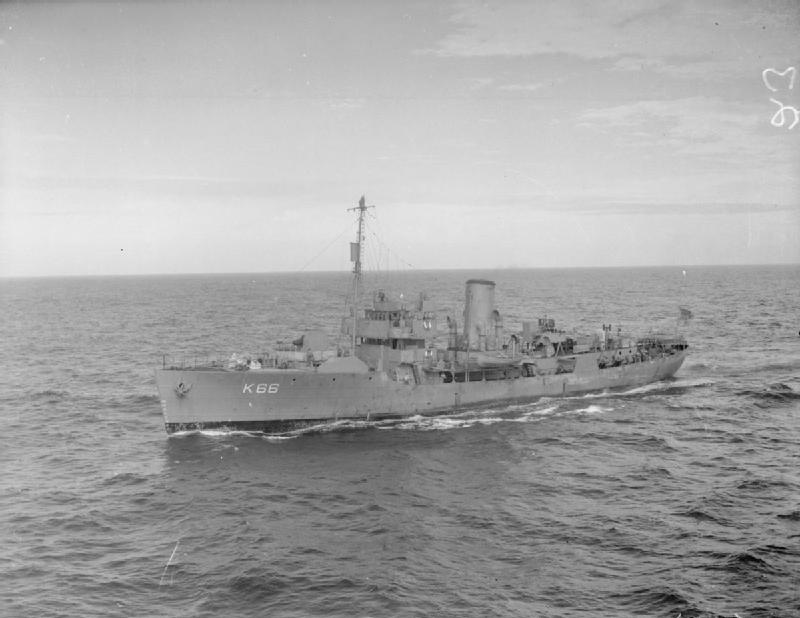
- HMS Begonia (K66), underway at sea, September 1941

History

United Kingdom
- Name: HMS Begonia
- Namesake: Begonia
- Builder: Cook, Welton & Gemmell, Beverley
- Laid down: 25 July 1939
- Launched: 24 April 1940
- Commissioned: 3 March 1941
- Decommissioned: 10 March 1942
- Identification: Pennant number: K66
- Fate: Transferred to United States Navy

United States
- Name: USS Impulse
- Commissioned: 10 March 1942
- Decommissioned: 22 August 1945
- Identification: Hull number: PG-68
- Fate: Returned to Royal Navy

United Kingdom
- Name: HMS Begonia
- Namesake: Begonia
- Commissioned: 22 August 1945
- Fate: Sold into civilian service, 22 July 1946, wrecked 1970

General characteristics
- Class & type: Flower-class corvette
- Displacement: 925 long tons (940 t; 1,036 short tons)
- Length: 205 ft (62.48 m)o/a
- Beam: 33 ft (10.06 m)
- Draught: 11.5 ft (3.51 m)
- Propulsion: single shaft; 2 × fire tube Scotch boilers; 1 × 4-cycle triple-expansion reciprocating steam engine; 2,750 ihp (2,050 kW)
- Speed: 16 knots (29.6 km/h)
- Range: 3,500 nautical miles (6,482 km) at 12 knots (22.2 km/h)
- Complement: 85
- Sensors & processing systems: 1 × SW1C or 2C radar; 1 × Type 123A or Type 127DV sonar
- Armament: 1 × 4-inch BL Mk.IX single gun; 2 × .50 cal machine gun (twin); 2 × Lewis .303 cal machine gun (twin); 2 × Mk.II depth charge throwers; 2 × Depth charge rails with 40 depth charges; originally fitted with minesweeping gear, later removed

HMS Begonia was a Flower-class corvette that served in the Royal Navy during World War II. In 1942 she was lent to the United States Navy and commissioned as USS Impulse. Returned to the Royal Navy in 1945, Begonia was stricken and sold into merchant service. She was wrecked off the coast of Spain in 1970.

== Service history ==
The ship was built at Cook, Welton & Gemmell, of Beverley, England, as part of the 1939 Programme for the Royal Navy. One of the earliest Flower-class corvettes, she was ordered on 25 July 1939, laid down 13 March 1940 and launched on 18 September 1940. She was commissioned into the Royal Navy on 3 March 1941. She then served as a convoy escort.

=== Royal Navy ===
After working up, Begonia was assigned to the Western Approaches Escort Force for service as a convoy escort. In this role Begonia was engaged in all the duties performed by escort ships; protecting convoys, searching for and attacking U-boats which attacked ships in convoy, and rescuing survivors.

During this period she fought in several convoy battles. In July 1941 Begonia was part of the force escorting OG 69, which saw seven ships sunk and one U-boat damaged off the coast of Portugal. In September 1941 Begonia was with HG 73, which lost nine ships and an escort in a ten-day running battle. During her twelve months service in the Battle of the Atlantic Begonia escorted 15 Atlantic and 8 Gibraltar convoys, assisting in the safe passage of over 800 ships, though some were subsequently lost. One of a group of corvettes transferred to the U.S. Navy under reverse Lend-Lease, she was commissioned as USS Impulse in March 1942.

=== US Navy ===
She was commissioned as USS Impulse at London on 16 March 1942. Impulse departed from Lisahally, County Londonderry, Northern Ireland, on 15 April 1942 as a convoy escort. Upon arrival at New York on 4 May, the ship steamed to Norfolk, Virginia, and began regular operations as a coastal escort ship from Norfolk to Key West. Impulse returned to New York on 25 August 1942 for duty protecting the important supply line between that port and Guantánamo Bay, Cuba. For the next three years she made repeated escort voyages to and from Cuba, effectively helping to counter the German U-boat menace.

Impulse arrived at Boston on 6 July 1945 for return to the Royal Navy. She departed on 1 August and arrived Harwich, England, on 15 August. Decommissioned on 22 August 1945, the corvette was returned to the Royal Navy.

== Fate ==
The vessel was sold into civilian service on 22 July 1946, becoming the mercantile Begonlock. Resold in 1949 and renamed Fundiciones Molinao, the ship was renamed Astiluzu in 1951 and Rio Mero in 1956. She was wrecked off Punta de los Entinas, Spain, on 21 January 1970.
