= German trawler V 421 Rauzan =

German fishing trawler

History
- Name: Earl Hereford (1906–17); Guénon (1917–19); Pen-er-Vro (1919– ); Rauzan (by 1930–44)
- Owner: Earl Steam Fishing Co. (1906–12); Christian M. Evensen (1912–17); French Navy (1917–19); F. Evan (1919–33); L. Baillas (1933–42); Kriegsmarine (1942–44)
- Operator: Owner operated except:-; A. L. Black (1906–12)
- Port of registry: (United Kingdom of Great Britain and Ireland) Grimsby, United Kingdom (1906–12); (Denmark) Thorshavn, Faroe Islands (1912–17); French Navy (1917–19); Lorient, France (1919–43); Kriegsmarine (1942–44)
- Builder: Cook, Welton & Gemmell Ltd
- Yard number: 110
- Launched: 10 April 1906
- Completed: June 1906
- Commissioned: 1917 (French Navy); 20 May 1942 (Kriegsmarine)
- Decommissioned: 1919 (French Navy); 22 August 1944 (Kriegsmarine)
- Identification: United Kingdom Official Number 123569 (1906–12); Fishing boat registration GY 147 (1906–12); Code Letters HGMQ (1906–12); Code Letters KBWC (1912–17); Fishing boat registration L 1965 (1919–42); Code Letters OQHY (1919–34); Code Letters FOXA (1934–42); Pennant Number V 421 (1942–44)
- Fate: Lost 4 June 1944

General characteristics
- Class & type: Fishing trawler (1906–17, 1919–42); Auxiliary patrol vessel (1917–18); Vorpostenboot (1942–44)
- Tonnage: 259 GRT, 111 NRT
- Length: 128 ft 4 in (39.12 m)
- Beam: 22 ft 0 in (6.71 m)
- Draught: 11 ft 7 in (3.53 m)
- Depth: 12 ft 9 in (3.89 m)
- Installed power: Triple expansion steam engine, 60nhp
- Propulsion: Single screw propeller
- Speed: 9 knots (17 km/h)

Rauzan was built as the British fishing trawler Earl Hereford. Sold to the Faroe Islands in 1912, she was purchased by the French Navy in 1917, serving as the patrol boat Guénon. She was sold in 1919 and was renamed Pen-er-Vro. Renamed Rauzan by 1930, she was requisitioned by the Kriegsmarine during the Second World War for use as a vorpostenboot, serving as V 421 Rauzan. She was sunk in June 1944.

== Description ==
The ship was 128 feet 4 inches (39.12 m) long, with a beam of 22 feet 0 inches (6.71 m). She had a depth of 11 feet 7 inches (3.53 m), and a draught of 12 feet 9 inches (3.89 m). She was assessed at 259 GRT, 111 NRT. She was powered by a triple expansion steam engine, which had cylinders of 32 centimetres (12 1/2 in), 56 centimetres (22 in) and 89 centimetres (35 in) diameter by 61 centimetres (24 in) stroke. The engine was made by C. D. Holmes & Son Ltd., Hull, Yorkshire, United Kingdom. It was rated at 71nhp. The engine powered a single screw propeller. It could propel the ship at 9 knots (17 km/h).

== History ==
Earl Hereford was built as yard number 110 by Cook, Welton and Gemmell, Beverley, Yorkshire for the Earl Steam Fishing Co. Ltd., Grimsby, Lincolnshire. She was launched on 10 April 1906 and completed in June. The fishing boat registration GY 147 and United Kingdom Official Number 123569 were allocated. The Code Letters HGMQ were allocated and she was operated under the management of A. L. Black. In December 1912, she was sold to Christian M. Eversen, Thorshavn, Faroe Islands. The Code Letters KBWC were allocated. In 1917, Earl Hereford was purchased by the French Navy for use as an auxiliary patrol vessel. She was renamed Guénon.

In 1919, she was sold to F. Evan, Lorient, Morbihan and was renamed Pen-er-Vro. The fishing boat registration L 1965 was allocated, as were the Code Letters OQHY. She had been renamed Rauzan by 1930. In 1933, she was sold to L. Ballas, Lorient. Her Code Letters were changed to FOXA in 1934.

On 20 May 1942, Rauzan was seized by the Kriegsmarine. On 1 October, she was commissioned as a vorpostenboot and allocated to 4 Vorpostenflotille, serving as V 421 Rauzan. She was lost on 4 June 1944, during Operation Neptune. 4 Vorpostenflotille was operating out of Boulogne, Pas-de-Calais, France on that day. Its orders were to carry out a reconnaissance patrol from Boulogne in a westerly direction. V 421 Rauzan was decommissioned on 22 August 1944.

== Sources ==
- Gröner, Erich (1993). Die deutschen Kriegsschiffe 1815-1945 (in German). Vol. 8/I: Flußfahrzeuge, Ujäger, Vorpostenboote, Hilfsminensucher, Küstenschutzverbände (Teil 1). Koblenz: Bernard & Graefe. ISBN 3-7637-4807-5.
