= HMT Bredon =

Coordinates: 29°49′N 14°5′W

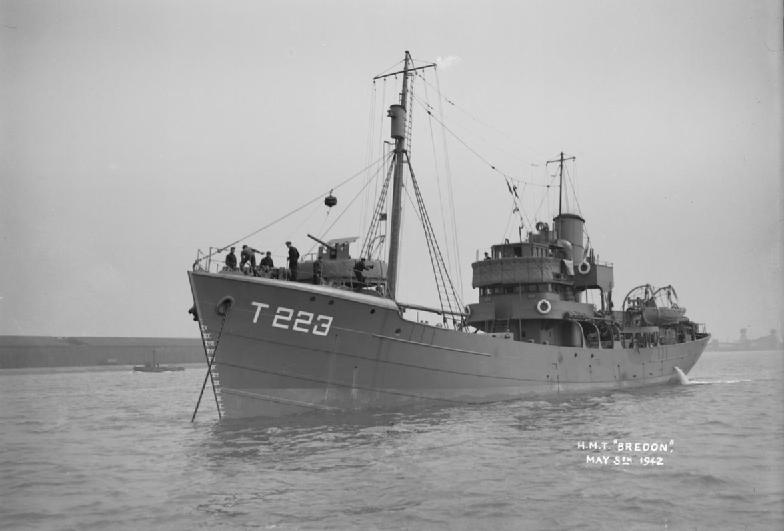

History

United Kingdom
- Name: HMT Bredon
- Ordered: 15 March 1941
- Builder: Cook, Welton & Gemmell, Beverley
- Laid down: 12 July 1941
- Launched: 20 November 1941
- Commissioned: 29 April 1942
- Fate: Sunk on 8 February 1943
- Notes: Pennant number: T223

General characteristics
- Class & type: Hill-class naval trawler
- Displacement: 750 tonnes (1,005 tonnes deep)
- Length: 155 ft (47 m)
- Draught: 12 ft (3.7 m)
- Propulsion: One 1-SE Cylindrical Boiler
- Complement: 37
- Armament: QF 12 pounder (76-mm) HA/LA main gun; 3 x 20 mm Anti Aircraft guns; 4 x 0.5-inch (12.7 mm) machine guns (2x2)

His Majesty's Trawler Bredon (Pennant Number T223) was a Hill class naval trawler that served as an anti-submarine escort trawler during the Second World War.

She was sunk by U-521 on 8 February 1943 while off the Canary Islands. Only 2 members of her crew complement of 43 survived.
