= ST Empire Rosa =

ST Empire Rosa was the name of two tugs:

- ST Empire Rosa (1944), a 593 GRT tug built by Clelands (Successors) Ltd, Willington Quay-on-Tyne.
- ST Empire Rosa (1945), a 292 GRT tug built by Blyth Dry Docks & Shipbuilding Co Ltd.
