= Trawlers of the Royal Navy =

List of trawlers of the Royal Navy

Naval trawlers were purpose-built or requisitioned and operated by the Royal Navy (RN), mainly during World Wars I and II. Vessels built to Admiralty specifications for RN use were known as Admiralty trawlers. All trawlers operated by the RN, regardless of origin, were typically given the prefix HMT, for "His Majesty's Trawler".

== Summary ==
=== First World War ===
Class	Builders	Dates	Built	Lost	Dspl (tons)	Length (feet)	Power (ihp)	Speed (kts)	Crew	Armament
Mersey Admiralty trawler	Cochrane Lobnitz Ferguson Goole Shipbuilders	1917–1919	112		438	148	600	11	up to 20	usually one QF 12 pdr 12 cwt gun
Castle	Smith's Dock and others		145		360				18	
Strath	Hall Russell		167		311				18	

The trawler Viola, built in 1906 at Hull and requisitioned September 1914 is the oldest surviving steam trawler in the world. She is beached at Grytviken in South Georgia, though there are plans to return her to Hull.

=== Second World War ===
Class	Builder	Dates	Built	Lost	Dspl (tons)	Length (feet)	Power (ihp)	Speed (kts)	Crew	Armament
*Basset			18	-	460			12	33	3 in gun
Tree			20	6	530	164	850	11.5	35	12 pdr gun, 2 × .5 in, 2 × twin MG
Dance			20	1	530	161	850	11.5	35	4 in gun, 3 × 20 mm
Shakespearian			12	3	545	164	950	12	35	12 pdr gun, 3 × 20 mm
Isles			112	12	545	164	850	12	40	12 pdr gun, 3 × 20 mm
Portuguese	CUF (Lisbon); Arsenal do Alfeite (Lisbon); Mónica (Aveiro)		12		550			11	30	12 pdr gun
Brazilian					680			12.5	40	
Castle					625			10	32	
Hill			8	2	750	181	970	11	35 (40?)	12 pdr gun, 3 × 20 mm
Fish			10	1	670	167	700	11	35	4 in gun, 3 × 20 mm
Round Table			8	-	440	137	600	12	35	12 pdr gun, 1 × 20 mm, 2 × MG
Military			9	-	750	193	1000	11	40	4 in gun, 4 × 20 mm
Requisitioned	These were ships taken over by the Admiralty		215	72						

== Requisitioned trawlers ==
There were also 215 trawlers of no specific class These were commercial trawlers that the Admiralty requisitioned. The Royal Navy classified requisitioned trawlers by manufacturer, although such classes were more diverse than traditional naval classifications. Seventy-two requisitioned trawlers were lost.

== See also ==
- Anti-submarine warfare
- Auxiliary Patrol
- List of mine countermeasure vessels of the Royal Navy
- Minesweepers of the Royal New Zealand Navy
- Royal Naval Patrol Service
- Vorpostenboot, the German equivalent to the trawlers of the Royal Navy
