= List of Empire ships (P) =

Guide through Empire Ships of the United Kingdom

== Suffix beginning with P ==
=== Empire Pacific ===
Empire Pacific was a 984-GRT (1,200 DWT) coaster which was built by Burntisland Shipbuilding Company Ltd. Sold in 1949 to the Straits Steamship Co Ltd, Singapore and renamed Buloh. Sold in 1957 to Tai Ping Steamship Navigation Co Ltd, Hong Kong and renamed Tainamshan. Ran aground on 26 November 1962 at Swatow, China and subsequently sank.

=== Empire Pagoda ===
Empire Pagoda was a 6,854-GRT cargo ship which was built by Hong Kong and Whampoa Dock Co Ltd, Hong Kong. Laid down as Empire Pagoda on 6 December 1941. Completed by the Japanese as Gyoten Maru. Torpedoed on 17 February 1944 and sunk by USS Tang west of Truk (08°04′N 149°28′E).

=== Empire Pakeha ===
Empire Pakeha was an 8,115-GRT cargo ship which was built by Harland & Wolff Ltd, Belfast. Launched in 1910 as 10,481-GRT Pakeha for Shaw Savill Line. Acquired by the Admiralty in September 1939 and rebuilt as a dummy battleship representing HMS Revenge. Used as a decoy in the Firth of Forth. Converted in June 1941 to a cargo ship, now 8,115 GRT. To MoWT and renamed Empire Pakeha. To Shaw Savill Lines in 1946 and renamed Pakeha. Chartered by the Ministry of Food and used as a meat storage ship in the River Thames. Scrapped in May 1950 at Briton Ferry, West Glamorgan.

=== Empire Palace ===
Empire Palace was a 977-GRT coaster which was built by William Hamilton & Co Ltd, Glasgow. Launched in June 1945 and completed in September 1945. Sold in 1949 to Sarawak Steamship Co, Kuching and renamed Belaga. Sold in 1958 to Devidas Gulab, Hong Kong and renamed Kishni. Sold in 1964 to Avon Shipping & Trading Co, Hong Kong and renamed Ocean King. Scrapped in October 1971 at Kaohsiung, Taiwan.

=== Empire Paladin ===
Empire Paladin was an 8,141-GRT tanker which was built by Furness Shipbuilding Co Ltd, Haverton Hill-on-Tees. Launched on 21 April 1944 and completed in August 1944. To Royal Fleet Auxiliary in December 1946 and renamed RFA Wave Commander. Arrived on 9 May 1959 at Inverkeithing, Fife.

=== Empire Palm ===
Empire Palm was a 250-GRT tug which was built by Scott & Sons Ltd, Bowling, West Dunbartonshire. Launched on 20 January 1942 and completed in April 1942. Sold in 1946 to Ardrossan Harbour Co, Ardrossan, Ayrshire, and renamed Seaway. Scrapped in July 1969 at Dalmuir, Ayrshire.

=== Empire Pam ===
Empire Pam was a 259-GRT tug which was built by Cook, Welton & Gemmell Ltd, Beverley. Launched on 24 August 1945 and completed in November 1945. Sold in 1946 to Société Rem. et D'Assistance, Casablanca, and renamed El Hank. Sold in 1947 to Société Cher de Remorquage D'Assistance, Casablanca and renamed El Baraka.

=== Empire Pampas ===
Empire Pampas was a 974-GRT coaster which was built by Smiths Dock Co Ltd, Middlesbrough. Launched on 11 June 1945 and completed in October 1945. Sold in 1946 to Elder Dempster Lines and renamed Warri. Ran aground on 12 June 1956 at Iwerekun, 20 nautical miles (37 km) east of Lagos, Nigeria. Abandoned, declared a total loss.

=== Empire Panther ===
Empire Panther was a 5,600-GRT cargo ship which was built by Columbia River Shipbuilding Corp, Portland, Oregon. Completed in May 1919 as West Quechee for the United States Shipping Board (USSB). To Lykes Brothers-Ripley Steamship Co Inc in 1933. To MoWT in 1940 and renamed Empire Panther. Struck a mine on 1 January 1943 and sank 8 nautical miles (15 km) off Strumble Head, Pembrokeshire.

=== Empire Paragon ===
Empire Paragon was a 9,892-GRT cargo liner which was built by Sir J Laing & Sons Ltd, Sunderland. Launched on 25 February 1944 and completed in August 1944. Sold in 1946 to Peninsular and Oriental Steam Navigation Co Ltd and renamed Pinjarra. Sold in 1962 to International Export Lines, Hong Kong and renamed Hongkong Importer. Operated under the management of C Y Tung, Hong Kong. Arrive on 26 December 1969 at Kaohsiung, Taiwan for scrapping.

=== Empire Park ===
Empire Park was a 974-GRT coaster which was built by Blyth Dry Docks & Shipbuilding Co Ltd, Blyth, Northumberland. Launched on 20 November 1945 and completed in April 1946. Sold in 1952 to Ben Line Steamers Ltd and renamed Benveg. Sold in 1962 to Ta Hing Co (Hong Kong) Ltd and renamed Grandhing. Sold in 1963 to China Pacific Navigation Co, Panama. Sold in 1964 to Compagnia de Navigazione Abeto, Panama and renamed Sumbawa. Sold in 1968 to Asia Maritime Co, Liberia and renamed Amarina. Chartered at a later date to Fushing Navigation co, Hong Kong. Captured in April 1970 and confiscated by South Vietnam. To Vietnam Ocean Shipping Co, South Vietnam in 1975.

=== Empire Parkeston ===
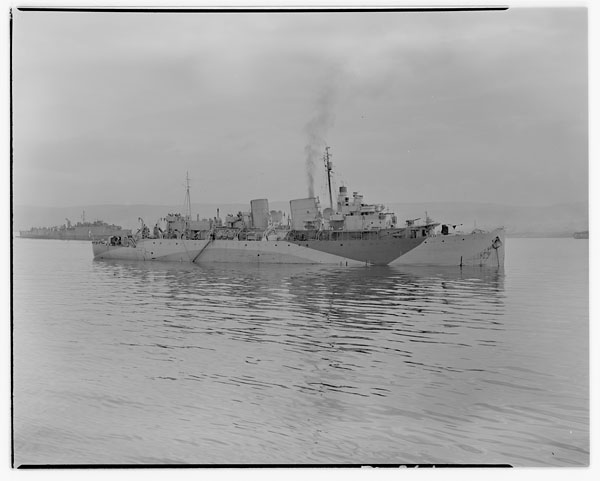
HMCS Prince Henry

Empire Parkeston was a 5,556-GRT troopship that was built by Cammell Laird & Co Ltd, Birkenhead. Launched in 1930 as Prince Henry for Canadian National Steamships. Sold in 1937 to Clark Steamship Co, Quebec. Refitted and renamed North Star. Purchased in 1939 by the Royal Canadian Navy and converted by Burrard Dry Dock co, Vancouver to auxiliary cruiser HMCS Prince Henry. Converted in 1944 into a landing ship, infantry. After a distinguished wartime career she was transferred to the British Ministry of Transport (MoT) for $500,000 in 1946 and renamed Empire Parkeston. Used as a troopship between Harwich and the Hook of Holland. Scrapped in February 1962 in Spezia, Italy.

=== Empire Parsons ===
Empire Parsons was a 6,742-GRT cargo ship which was built by William Gray & Co Ltd, West Hartlepool. Launched on 23 August 1941 and completed in October 1941. Ran aground on 12 January 1942 at Stroma, Pentland Firth (58°41′N 03°06′W). Broke in three, abandoned as a total loss.

=== Empire Passmore ===
Empire Passmore was a 974-GRT (1,200 DWT) coaster which was built by Blyth Dry Docks & Shipbuilding Co Ltd, Blyth. Launched on 6 October 1945 and completed in February 1946. Struck a mine on 15 April 1947 near the Horsburgh Lighthouse, Singapore and severely damaged. Tower to Singapore by Anhui and repaired. Sold in 1949 to Straits Steamship Co Ltd, Singapore and renamed Beluru. Sold in 1954 to Scindia Steam Navigation Company Ltd., India and renamed Jalabala. Scrapped in June 1964 at Bombay.

=== Empire Pat ===
Empire Pat was a 275-GRT tug which was built by Cochrane & Sons Ltd, Selby. Launched on 30 May 1942 and completed in August 1942. Chartered in 1946 to British Tanker Co Ltd, Bandar-e Mashur, Iran. Sold in 1949 to Kuwait Oil Co Ltd and renamed Himma. Sold in 1951 to J Fenwick & Co Ltd, Sydney. Sold in 1972 to Pimco Shipping Co, Papua New Guinea then in 1974 to W J Byers, Papua New Guinea. Scuttled in 1977 off New South Wales as an artificial reef.

=== Empire Path ===
Empire Path was a 6,140-GRT cargo ship which was built by John Readhed & Sons Ltd, South Shields. Launched on 5 July 1943 and completed in September 1943. Struck a mine on 24 December 1944 off Dunkirk, France (51°22′N 02°25′E). Beached, but her back was broken, declared a total loss.

=== Empire Patrai ===
Empire Patrai was a 2,754-GRT cargo ship which was built by Flensburger Schiffbau-Gesellschaft, Flensburg. Launched in 1943, seized in May 1945 in an incomplete state. Completed in 1947 as Empire Towy for MoT, Sold to Fenton Steamship Co subject to condemnation by Prize Court. Renamed Empire Patrai in 1950. Sold in 1953 to Hellenic Lines, Greece and renamed Patrai. Sold in 1981 to Celika Navigation Co, Cyprus. Sold in 1983 to Crystal Breese Corp. Operated under the management of Roussos Bros, Greece. Scrapped in 1984 in Perama, Greece.

=== Empire Patriot ===
Empire Patriot was a 2,983-GRT cargo ship which was built by William Gray & Co Ltd, West Hartlepool. Launched on 29 June 1942 and completed in August 1942. Sold in 1946 to The South Georgia Co Ltd and renamed Struan. Operated under the management of Christian Salvesen & Co Ltd, Leith. Sold in 1960 to Marconato Compagnia Navigazione SA, Panama and renamed Zannis. Sold in 1967 to V Roussos, Greece and renamed Orontes. Sold in 1970 to Marconato Compagnia Navigazione SA, Panama. Operated under the management of G D Partikios Ltd, Greece. Scrapped in February 1974 in Istanbul, Turkey.

=== Empire Patrol ===
Empire Patrol was a 3,338-GRT cargo ship which was built by Stabilimento Tecnico Triestino, Trieste. Complete in 1938 as Rodi for Società Anonima Adriatica Navigazione, Trieste. Seized on 10 June 1940 at Malta after being intercepted by the British Contraband Control before Italy entered the war. To MoWT and renamed Empire Patrol. On 29 September 1945, she sailed from Port Said, Egypt bound for Kastelorizo, Greece with 496 Greek refugees. Caught fire when 38 nautical miles (70 km) from Port Said and abandoned. Taken into tow but capsized and sank on 1 October when still 18 nautical miles (33 km) from Port Said.

=== Empire Pattern ===
Empire Pattern was a 974-GRT coaster which was built by Smiths Dock Co Ltd, Middlesbrough. Launched on 27 April 1945 and completed in August 1945. Sold in 1948 to Elder Dempster Lines and renamed Forcados. Sold in 1962 to S L Anghelatos, Greece and renamed Barbalias. Sold in 1966 to G Tzortzis & C Sykias, Greece and renamed Agia Varvara. On 12 December 1966, she caught fire off Jeddah, Saudi Arabia, capsized and sank.

=== Empire Paul ===
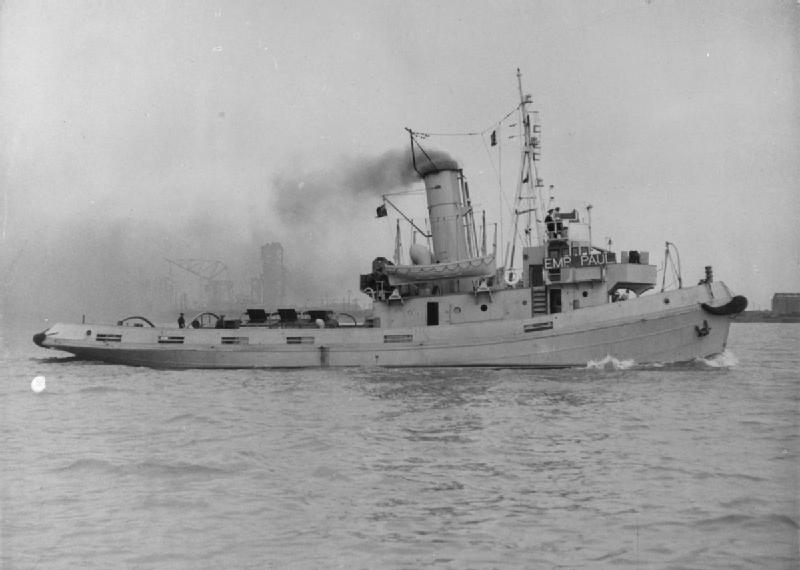
Empire Paul

Empire Paul was a 242-GRT tug which was built by J S Watson Ltd, Gainsborough. Launched on 7 July 1944 and completed in September 1944. Sold in 1946 to R & J H Rea Ltd. and renamed Queensgarth. Sold in 1949 to France, Fenwick Tyne & West Co Ltd and renamed Beamish.

On 18 October 1949, she was towing aircraft carrier HMS Albion in company with tugs Hendon and George V from Jarrow to Rosyth when Albion was in collision with Maystone 4 nautical miles (7.4 km) from the Longstone Lighthouse. Maystone sank, Albion had a 225 square feet (20.9 m^{2}) hole in her stern and started to sink. The three tugs attempted to beach her near St Abb's Head but were hampered when Hector became disabled when a tow rope wrapped around her propeller. Tug HMS Restive was sent from Rosyth to assist and destroyer HMS St James arrived and took Hector on tow until her crew managed to clear the propeller. Albion was successfully berthed at Rosyth with 5 feet (1.5 m) of water in her engine room.

Beamish was chartered to Red Funnel for a period in 1951. Beamish represented the British tug fleets at the Coronation Review at Spithead in 1953. Fitted with a new diesel engine in 1964. Sold in June 1970 to R Mellenger, St John's, Newfoundland and Labrador and renamed R Mellenger. Sold in November 1970 to Industrial Insulators Ltd, Canada and renamed Beamish. Sold in 1973 to Western Engineering Service Ltd, Canada and renamed Thunder Cape. Sold in 1986 to Great Lakes Marine Contracting Co, Canada.

=== Empire Pavilion ===
Empire Pavilion was a 974-GRT (1,200 DWT) coaster which was built by Blyth Dry Docks & Shipbuilding Co Ltd, Blyth. Launched on 9 August 1945 and completed in November 1945. Sold in 1946 to Elder Dempster Lines Ltd and renamed Sapele. Sold in 1963 to Bergens Mekaniske Verksted, Bergen, Norway and then sold again later that year to Ocean Industries Ltd, Pakistan. Converted to a factory ship and renamed Mahia. Sold in 1969 to Pan Islamic Steamship Co, Pakistan and renamed Safina-E-Armer. Scrapped in October 1963 in Karachi, Pakistan.

=== Empire Peacemaker ===
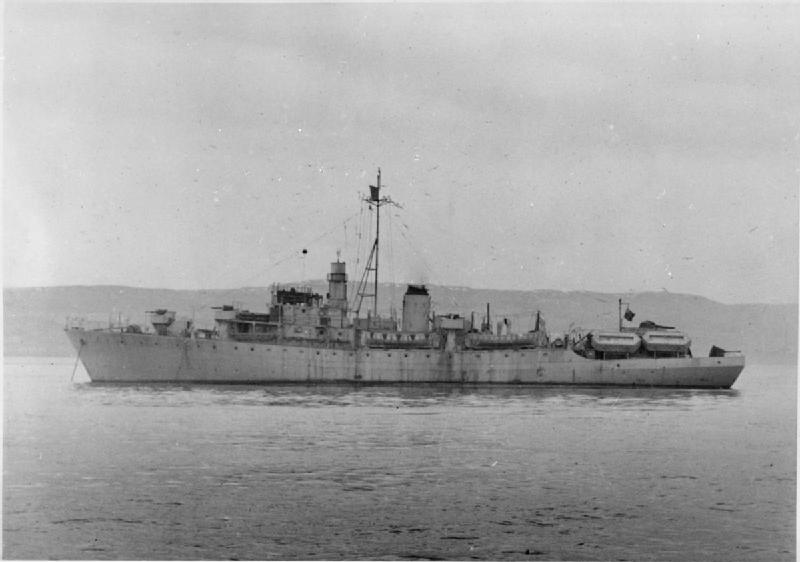
Empire Peacemaker

Empire Peacemaker was a 1,333-GRT convoy rescue ship which was built by Fleming & Ferguson Ltd, Paisley. Launched on 8 September 1944 as HMS Scarborough Castle for the Royal Navy. Completed in January 1945 as Empire Peacemaker for MoWT. Laid up at Falmouth c. 1954. Sold to Belgian buyer in July 1955 and towed to Antwerp for an intended refit for service in the Belgian Congo. The scheme did not proceed and the ship was scrapped in December 1955 at Ghent.

=== Empire Peacock ===
Empire Peacock was a 6,098-GRT cargo ship which was built by Federal Shipbuilding Co, Kearny New Jersey. Launched on 13 September 1919 and completed in October 1919 as Bellhaven for the USSB. To MoWT in 1941 and renamed Empire Peacock. Laid up at Durban South Africa from 18 May 1942 to 19 July 1943 with disabled turbines. Scuttled on 25 August 1946 with a cargo of obsolete chemical ammunition at 47°55′N 08°30′W.

=== Empire Peak ===
Empire Peak was a 7045-GRT cargo ship which was built by William Gray & Co Ltd, West Hartlepool. Launched on 4 May 1943 and completed in July 1943. Sold in 1947 to Dorset Steamship Co Ltd and renamed Charmouth Hill. Operated under the management of Counties Ship Management Co Ltd. Sold in 1949 to London & Overseas Freighters Ltd. Renamed London Mariner in 1950. Sold in 1951 to Ragruppamento Armatore Fratelli Grimaldi, Italy and renamed Leone. Sold in 1960 to Aldebaran Compagnia de Navigazione SA. Sold in 1963 to Vinti Freighters Ltd, Cyprus and renamed Marianella.

On 19 October 1967 Marinella sailed from Houston, Texas bound for Calcutta with a cargo of sulphate of ammonia. She put into Kingston, Jamaica after leaks developed in bad weather. During this voyage, her engine fan broke down and her boiler tubes became clogged as a result of steaming on natural draught. She spent some days adrift without power as a result. Main pumps were found to need replacement, spares were flown in from Europe. On 11 January 1968 she sailed for Dakar but put into Takoradi, Ghana. She sailed from there on 10 May bound for Luanda, Portuguese West Africa, leaving there on 15 June and arriving at Cape Town on 26 June with boiler trouble. She was anchored in Table Bay.

The voyage was abandoned when it was discovered that the cost of repairs exceeded the value of the ship. Marianella remained at anchor for five months, putting into port fortnightly for fresh water for her boilers. Her cargo was transhipped for onward delivery as there was no local market for it. Marinella was sold to Italian shipbreakers and left Cape Town on 9 December 1968 under tow of ST Smjeli. Arrived on 6 March 1969 at Vado for scrapping.

=== Empire Pearl ===
Empire Pearl was a 9,881-GRT tanker which was built by Sir J Laing & Sons Ltd, Sunderland. The first attempt to launch on 10 July 1941 resulted in the ship being stuck halfway down the slipway. Launched on 29 July 1941 and completed in October 1941. Allocated to the Norwegian Government in 1942 and renamed Norheim. Sold in 1945 to Ole Berg, Oslo, and renamed Kollgrim. New diesel engine, reclaimed from sunken Vega, fitted in 1950. Sold in 1955 to Dingwall Shipping Co Ltd, Halifax, Nova Scotia and renamed Walton. Operated under the management of Nordstrom & Thulin A/B, Sweden. Converted to an ore carrier, now 10,080 GRT (14,359 DWT). Sold in 1963 to United Shipping and Trading Co Ltd and renamed James Hamel. Sold later that year to Paget Traders Inc, Liberia, and renamed Paget Trader. Operated under the management of Ship Services Ltd, Bermuda. Sold in 1968 to Pecos Steamship Co Inc, Liberia. Operated under the management of Elkan Ltd, Bermuda. Scrapped in January 1969 at Vinaròs, Spain.

=== Empire Peggotty ===
Empire Peggotty was a 2,066-GRT collier which was built by Grangemouth Dockyard Co Ltd, Grangemouth. Launched on 25 April 1944 and completed in July 1944. Sold in 1946 to Harries Bros & Co Ltd, Swansea and renamed Glanowen. Sold in 1965 to Balmoral Shipping Corporation, Liberia and renamed Balmoral. Operated under the management of Transocean Maritima S M Bull SA, Spain. Ran aground on 12 March 1967 in Weser Estuary in bad weather. Broke in two on 5 April 1967, bow section salvaged and towed to Bruges for scrapping, where it arrived on 12 October 1967.

=== Empire Peggy ===
Empire Peggy was a 259-GRT tug which was built by Cook, Welton & Gemmell Ltd, Beverley. Launched in May 1945 and completed in July 1945. Sold in 1946 to the Marine Nationale. Sold in 1949 to Williams & Co Pty Ltd, Brisbane and renamed Coringa. Sold in 1974 to Northern Salvage Ltd, Australia and renamed Empire Peggy. Scrapped in June 1977 at Cairns, Queensland.

=== Empire Pelican ===
Empire Pelican was a 6,463-GRT cargo ship which was built by Skinner & Eddy, Seattle. Completed in 1919 as Stanley for USSB. To MoWT in 1941 and renamed Empire Pelican. Bombed on 14 November 1941 by Italian aircraft and sunk between Galita Island and Tunisia.

=== Empire Penang ===
Empire Penang was a cargo ship which was built by Bartram & Sons Ltd, Sunderland. Laid down as Empire Penang but launched on 10 July 1941 as HMS Mullion Cove. Completed as a maintenance ship. Converted in 1948 to a 7,146-GRT cargo ship, sold to Clunies Shipping Co, Greenock and renamed Margaret Clunies. Sold in 1951 to Turnbull, Scott & Co Ltd and renamed Waynegate. Sold in 1961 to Pacifico Compagnia Navigazione SA, Panama and renamed Katingo. Sold in 1964 to Philippine President Lines, Manila and renamed President Magsaysay. Renamed Magsaysay in 1968. On 19 July 1968 she caught fire off Korea (34°48′N 125°51′E) and was abandoned. The fire was extinguished and she was towed to Pusan, South Korea, declared a constructive total loss and scrapped in December 1968 at Pusan.

=== Empire Pendennis ===
Empire Pendennis was a 7,053-GRT cargo ship which was built by Short Brothers Ltd, Sunderland. Launched on 11 April 1944 and completed in June 1944. Sold in 1946 to Cunard White Star Line Ltd and renamed Vasconia. Sold in 1950 to Blue Star Line and renamed Fresno Star. Renamed Millais in 1957. Sold in 1960 to Grosvenor Shipping Co Ltd, London and renamed Grosvenor Navigator. Operated under the management of Mollers Ltd, Hong Kong. On 2 September 1962 she was hit by SS Ocean Glory which had broken free of her moorings in a typhoon at Hong Kong. Arrived on 9 September 1966 at Kaohsiung, Taiwan for scrapping.

=== Empire Penguin ===
Empire Penguin was a 6,389-GRT (9,600 DWT) cargo ship which was built by Skinner & Eddy, Seattle. Completed in 1919 as Elkridge for the USSB. Sold in 1928 to Oceanic and Oriental Steam Navigation Co, San Francisco and renamed Golden Star. Sold in 1937 to American-Hawaiian Steamship Co and renamed Tennessean. To MoWT in 1940 and renamed Empire Penguin. Allocated in 1942 to the Dutch Government and renamed Van de Velde. Sold in 1947 to Koninklijke Hollandsche Lloyd and renamed Rijnland. Renamed Rynland in 1949. Sold in 1957 to Compagnia Navigazione Maraventure, Panama and renamed Vaptistis. Operated under the management of Lemos & Pateras Ltd. Scrapped in September 1959 at Lisbon.

=== Empire Penn ===
Empire Penn was a 5,326-GRT cargo ship which was built by Barclay Curle & Co Ltd, Glasgow. Laid down as Empire Penn and launched on 19 December 1941 as Kong Haakon VII. Launch attended by King Haakon VII of Norway. On launching, she was in collision with SS Myrmidon of the Blue Funnel Line and severely damaged at her stern, Myrmidon was damaged amidships. The ship was the first to be handed over to Norway as reparation for war losses. Completed in April 1942. Sold in 1946 to H Staubo & Co, Norway. Sold in 1951 to Compagnia Naviera Arica SA, Panama and renamed Cavofrigelo. Sold in 1953 to Compagnia de Navigazione Golfo Azul SA, Panama and renamed Emporios. Sold in 1967 to Philippine President Lines and renamed Aguinaldo, now 7,068 GRT. Renamed Liberty Three in 1969, President Magsaysay in 1972 and the later that year renamed Liberty Three, now 6,855 GRT. Arrived on 17 July 1972 at Kaohsiung, Taiwan for scrapping.

=== Empire Pennant ===
Empire Pennant was a 7,069-GRT cargo ship which was built by Lithgows Ltd, Port Glasgow. Launched on 30 September 1942 and completed in December 1942. Sold in 1946 to Houlder Brothers and renamed Langton Grange. Arrived on 5 October 1950 at Hong Kong for scrapping.

=== Empire Penryn ===
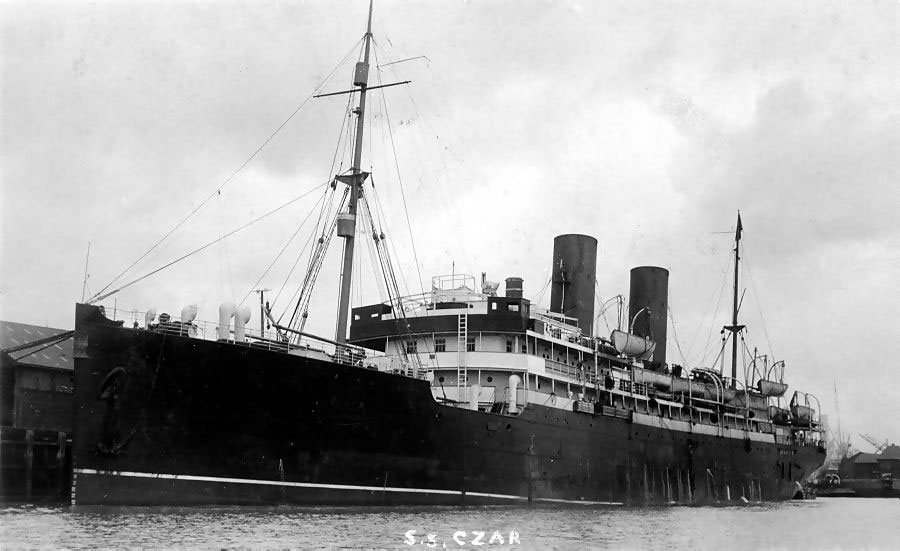
Czar

Empire Penryn was a 6,515-GRT ocean liner which was built by Barclay, Curle & Co Ltd, Glasgow. Launched in 1912 as Czar. Requisitioned after the Russian Revolution by the British Government. Returned in 1921 Russian American Line, passed to East Asiatic Co, Denmark and renamed Estonia. Sold in 1930 to Gdynia America Lines and renamed Pulaski. In 1940 was in port in Konakri, Senegal when France Fell. French authorities agreed to detain her but she escaped by night under heavy fire. To MoWT in 1945 and renamed Empire Penryn. Refitted at Calcutta. Scrapped in 1949 at Blyth.

=== Empire Perak ===
Empire Perak was a 7,059-GRT cargo ship which was built by Short Brothers, Sunderland. Laid down as Empire Perak. Taken over by the Admiralty in April 1944 and launched on 4 September 1944 as Dullisk Cove. Towed to Smiths Doc Co, Middlesbrough for completion. Completed in June 1945 as a hull repair ship. Laid up at Holy Loch awaiting disposal. Sold in 1947 to Kefalonian Steamship Co and renamed Kefalonian, now 7,327 GRT. Operated under the management of Haddon Steamship Co, London. Sold in 1951 to the Australian Shipping Board and renamed Tyalla. Transferred in 1957 to Australian National Line and resold later that year to Cambay Prince Steamship Co and renamed Wear Breeze. Ran aground in March 1962 at Jeddah. Refloated and towed by Danish tug Svitzer to Port Said. Repairs uneconomic, scrapped in July 1962 at Yokosuka, Japan.

=== Empire Percy ===
Empire Percy was a 138-GRT tug which was built by R Dunston Ltd, Thorne, Yorkshire. Launched on 20 June 1943 and completed in September 1943. Sold in 1948 to the Port of London Authority and renamed Thorney. Scrapped in February 1968 at Bruges, Belgium.

=== Empire Perdita ===
Empire Perdita was a 7,028-GRT cargo ship which was built by John Readhead and Sons Ltd, South Shields. Launched on 10 March 1943 and completed in May 1943. Sold in 1948 to Ensign Steamship Co Ltd and renamed Navarino. Operated under the management of S G Embiricos Ltd, London. Sold in 1952 to NAvigazione Dani SpA and renamed Fortunato B. Operated under the management of Dani & co, Genoa. Arrived in December 1964 at Vado, Italy for scrapping.

=== Empire Peregrine ===
Empire Peregrine was a 7,842-GRT type C2-SU cargo ship which was built by Sun Shipbuilding & Drydock Co., Chester, Pennsylvania. Completed in October 1941 as China Mail for American Mail Line, Seattle. To MoWT in 1941 and renamed Empire Peregrine. To United States Maritime Commission (USMC) in 1942 and renamed Ocean Mail. Conversion to a transport ship completed in November 1943. To American Mail Line in 1947 and then to United States Maritime Administration in 1959. Scrapped in April 1969 at Tacoma, Washington.

=== Empire Peri ===
Empire Peri was a 4,769-GRT tanker which was built by Fratelli Orlando, Livorno. Completed in 1905 as Bronte for the Regia Marina. Captured by the Royal Navy on 25 August 1941 at Bandar Shapur, Iran. To MoWT and renamed Empire Peri. Scrapped in 1947 at Bombay.

=== Empire Perlis ===
Empire Perlis was a 3,359-GRT cargo ship built by William Gray & Co Ltd, West Hartlepool, launched on 22 May 1944 and completed in July 1944. Sold in 1946 to Indo-China Steam Navigation Company Ltd., London and renamed Hinsang. Sold in 1965 to Kinabatangan Shipping Co Ltd, Hong Kong and renamed Kowloon. Operated under the management of United China Shipping Co Ltd, Hong Kong. To Concordia Kinabatangan Shipping Co, Panama in 1969 and renamed Horis. On 25 December 1969 she put into Surabaya, Indonesia with damage sustained in bad weather. On 28 December 1969 she developed a leak in her engine room, abandoned the next day, capsized and sank in the Celebes Sea at 03°53′N 119°23′E.

=== Empire Petrel ===
Empire Petrel was a LST (3) which was built by Canadian Vickers Ltd, Montreal, Quebec. Completed in October 1943 as LST 3520. To Royal Navy as HMS Thruster. Laid up in the River Clyde. To MoT in 1956 and renamed Empire Petrel, used as a ferry during the Suez Crisis under the management of Atlantic Steam Navigation Co Ltd until 1961 and then transferred to the management of the British India Steam Navigation Co Ltd. Laid up in Singapore, scrapped there in July 1968.

=== Empire Phyllis ===
Empire Phyllis was a 257-GRT tug which was built by John Crown & Sons Ltd, Sunderland. Launched on 2 December 1944 and completed in January 1945. Sold in 1947 to Kuwait Oil Co Ltd and renamed Hayat. Sold in 1961 to Impresse Maritime Augustea, Italy and renamed Brucoli. Transferred in 1982 to the Marina Militare at Messina. Did not enter service and was later scrapped.

=== Empire Pibroch ===
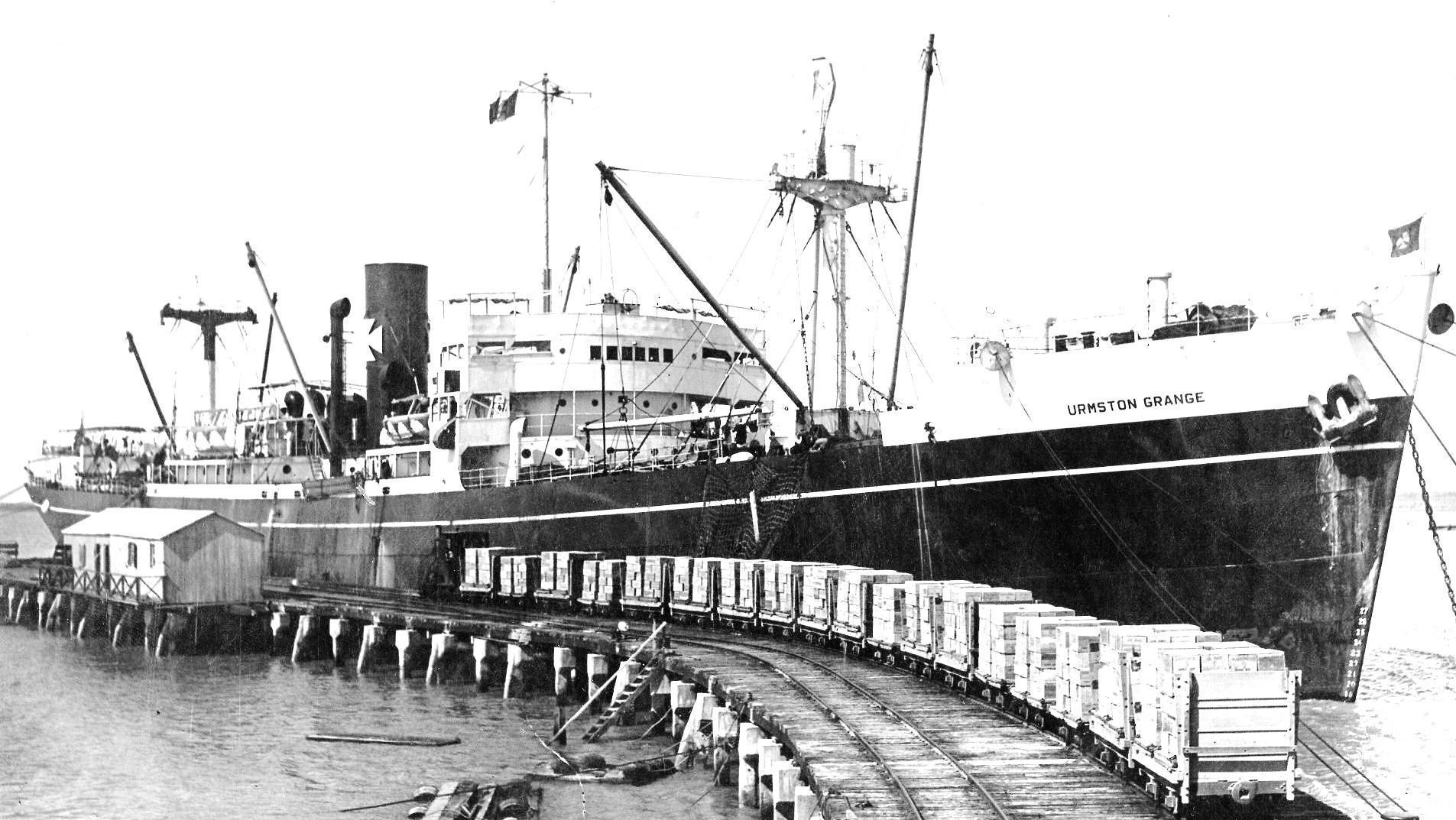
Houlder Brothers' Urmston Grange, built as Empire Pibroch

Empire Pibroch was a 7,046-GRT cargo ship which was built by Lithgows Ltd, Port Glasgow. Launched on 2 September 1942 and completed in November 1942. Sold in 1946 to Houlder Brothers and renamed Urmston Grange. Sold in 1959 to Argonaut Shipping & Trading Co Ltd and renamed Argo Grange. Operated under the management of C Y Tung, Hong Kong. Arrived on 18 December 1959 at Hong Kong for scrapping.

=== Empire Pickwick ===
Empire Pickwick was a 7,068-GRT cargo ship which was built by John Readhead & Sons Ltd, South Shields. Launched on 31 August 1943 and completed in November 1943. Sold in 1948 to Clan Line Steamers Ltd and renamed Clan Mackendrick. Sold in 1961 to Mullion & Co Ltd, Hong Kong and renamed Ardpatrick. Sold in 1966 to National Shipping Corporation, Karachi and renamed Haringhata. Arrived on 16 July 1978 at Karachi for scrapping.

=== Empire Pict ===
Empire Pict was an 8,134-GRT tanker which was built by Blythswood Shipbuilding Co Ltd, Glasgow. Launched on 11 September 1941 and completed in November 1941. Allocated in 1942 to the Norwegian Government and renamed Norland. Torpedoed on 20 May 1942 and sunk by U-108 east of Bermuda (31°29′N 55°37′W) while a member of Convoy ON 93.

=== Empire Pierrot ===
Empire Pierrot was a 235-GRT tug which was built by A Hall & Co Ltd, Aberdeen. Launched on 13 August 1943 and completed in October 1943. Sold in 1948 to the Government of Trinidad and renamed St Patrick. To Trinidad Port Authority in 1966 and renamed Empire Pierrot. Removed from shipping registers in 1978.

=== Empire Pike ===
Empire Pike was a 1,854-GRT tanker which was built by the Government Shipyard, Sorel, Quebec. Built in 1903 as W S Fielding. Converted in 1914 to a dredger and renamed P W D No 1. To the Canadian Government in 1943 and converted to a tanker, renamed Riding Mountain Park. to MoWT in 1945 and renamed Empire Pike. Sold in 1947 to Bulk Storage Co Ltd, London and renamed Basingford. To Basinghall Shipping Co. Scrapped in 1949 at Dunston on Tyne.

=== Empire Pilgrim ===
Empire Pilgrim was a 2,828-GRT cargo ship which was built by William Gray & Co Ltd, West Hartlepool. Launched on 20 November 1941 and completed in January 1942. Ran aground on 25 January 1942 14 nautical miles (26 km) north of Aberdeen, holed and abandoned. Salvage commenced on 5 February and she was refloated on 16 February. Towed to Blyth for repairs by Empire Larch, arriving on 21 March. Allocated in 1942 to the Norwegian Government and renamed Astrid. Sold in 1945 to A/S Granli and renamed Tindefjell. Operated under the management of R Ugelstad, Norway. Sold in 1948 to A Schjelderup, Norway and renamed Ringhorn. Sold in 1951 to Jansens Rederi A/S, operated under the management of I Jansen, Norway. Sold in 1958 to Pan-Norse Steamship Co, Panama and renamed Indonor. Operated under the management of Wallem & Co, Hong Kong. Ran aground on 3 February 1960 at Kemojan Island, Indonesia. Sank on 7 February after slipping off the reef she was stuck on.

=== Empire Pine ===
Empire Pine was a 250-GRT tug which was built by Scott & Sons Ltd, Bowling. Launched on 10 June 1941 and completed in September 1941. Sold in 1946 to Steel & Bennie Ltd and renamed Vanguard. Renamed Battleaxe in 1961 and sold later that year to Newport Screw Towing Co Ltd, Newport, Monmouthshire and renamed Dunfalcon. Scrapped in December 1968 at Newport.

=== Empire Pintail ===
Empire Pintail was a 7,773-GRT C3 type cargo ship which was built by the Federal Shipbuilding and Drydock Company, Kearney, New Jersey. Launched 13 July and completed in September 1940 as Howell Lykes for Lykes Brothers Steamship Co. To MoWT in October 1941 and renamed Empire Pintail. To USMC in February 1942 and renamed Howell Lykes. Converted to a transport ship by Bethlehem Steel Co, Baltimore, Maryland completed in December 1943. Operated as a War Shipping Administration troopship by Lykes as WSA agent until lay up in reserve fleet 5 April 1946. To Lykes Brothers Steamship Co in February 1946. Sold in 1965 to Sperling Steamship & Trading Corp, USA and renamed Kings Point. Sold later that year to American Export Isbrandtsen Lines Inc, and renamed Flying Foam. Arrived on 10 December 1970 at Kaohsiung, Taiwan for scrapping, but resold to Sea King Corp, New York and renamed Grand Yaling. Scrapped in September 1971 at Kaohsiung.

=== Empire Pioneer ===
Empire Pioneer was a 2,076-GRT (2,825 DWT) collier which was built by Ailsa Shipbuilding Co Ltd, Troon. Launched on 10 November 1942 and completed in December 1942. Sold in 1946 to Hudson Steamship Co Ltd, London and renamed Hudson Bank. Sold in 1959 to Ertel, Bieber & Co GmbH, West Germany. Rebuilt and fitted with a diesel engine, renamed Gertrud C Ertel. Ran aground on 24 December 1965 at Falsterbo, Sweden and broke in two. Declared a constructive total loss. Refloated in July 1968, arrived under tow on 29 July at Oskarshamn, cargo of coal discharged. Sold to Oskarshamn Varv and scrapped in August 1968.

=== Empire Piper ===
Empire Piper was a 263-GRT tug which was built by Clelands (Successors) Ltd, Willington Quay-on-Tyne. Launched on 28 May 1942 and completed in August 1942. Sold in 1947 to J Cooper, Belfast and renamed Piper. Sold in 1969 to R & J H Rea Ltd. Sold in 1970 to Cory Ship Towage Ltd. Sold in 1970 to A P Papayannis, Greece and renamed Sotirios. Reported sold in 1984 to shipbreakers at Rafina but deal not completed. Renamed Lalrion in 1985 and scrapped in 1986.

=== Empire Pitcairn ===
Empire Pitcairn was to have been a cargo ship which was built by John Readhead & Sons Ltd, South Shield. Laid down as Empire Pitcairn but taken over by the Admiralty while under construction. Launched on 19 July 1944 as Moray Firth. Completed as an aircraft component repair and maintenance ship. Sold in 1947 to Stag Line Ltd and renamed Linaria. Operated under the management of J Robinson & Sons Ltd. Converted to a cargo ship by Tyne Dock Engineering Co Ltd, now 7,333 GRT. Sold in 1954 to Chellew Navigation Co Ltd, London and renamed Eskglen. Sold in 1956 to Esk Shipping Co Ltd. Operated under the management of H M Lund, London. sold in 1961 to Fortune Shipping Co Ltd, Hong Kong and renamed Marine Fortune. Sold later that year to Herald Shipping Co Ltd, Hong Kong. Scrapped in August 1967 at Yokosuka, Japan.

=== Empire Pitt ===
Empire Pitt was a 7,086-GRT cargo ship which was built by J L Thomson & Sons Ltd, Sunderland. Launched on 28 January 1944 and completed in May 1944. Ran aground on 11 November 1946 off Berville-sur-Mer, France. Her back was broken and she was declared a constructive total loss.

=== Empire Pixie ===
Empire Pixie was a 263-GRT tug which was built by Goole Shipbuilding & Repairing Co Ltd, Goole. Launched on 27 August 1942 and completed in November 1942. Sold in 1946 to Clyde Shipping Co Ltd and renamed Flying Swordfish. Sold in 1957 to D Tripcovich & Co, Italy and renamed Fulgor. Scrapped in 1978 in Italy.

=== Empire Plane ===
Empire Plane was a 129-GRT tug which was built by R Dunston Ltd, Thorne. Launched on 9 November 1941 and completed in December 1941. Sold in 1958 to Shipping & Freighting Ltd, Southampton and renamed River Eskimo. Scrapped in 1964 in Southampton.ref

=== Empire Planet ===
Empire Planet was a 4,290-GRT cargo ship which was built by J Priestman & Co Ltd, Sunderland. Launched in 1923 as Barbara Marie. Sold in 1925 to Sea Steamship Co Ltd and renamed Portsea. Sold in 1933 to Nivose Società di Navigazione, Italy and renamed Cipro. Sold in 1937 to Lauro & Montella, Naples and renamed Stella. Captured on 14 August 1941 by HMS Circassia west of the Cape Verde Islands. Escorted to Bermuda. To MoWT and renamed Empire Planet. Sold in 1947 to Williamson & Co, Hong Kong and renamed Inchkeith. Struck an uncharted rock on 2 March 1955 near Port Meadows, Andaman Islands. Abandoned as a total loss.

=== Empire Ploughman ===
Empire Ploughman was a 7,049-GRT cargo ship which was built by William Gray & Co Ltd, West Hartlepool. Launched on 14 September 1943 and completed in November 1943. Sold in 1946 to H Hogarth & Sons Ltd and renamed Baron Geddes. Sold in 1959 to Paulins Rederi A/B, Finland and renamed Jytte Paulin. Arrived on 22 October 1968 at Shanghai for scrapping.

=== Empire Plover ===
Empire Plover was a 6,085-GRT (9,400 DWT) cargo ship which was built by Moore Shipbuilding Co, Oakland, California. Completed in 1920 as Janelew for the USSB. To MoWT in 1941 and renamed Empire Plover. To have been renamed Granvale in 1946 but sold in 1948 to Compagnia Maritime del Este, Panama and renamed Plover. Sold in 1951 to Società de Navigazione Magliveras, Panama and renamed Marianne. Sold in 1956 to Compagnia de Navigazione Alexander, Panama and renamed Nicolas. Scrapped in November 1958 at Vado, Italy.

=== Empire Polly ===
Empire Polly was a 235-GRT tug which was built by A Hall & Co Ltd, Aberdeen. Launched on 19 September 1944 and completed in November 1944. Sold in 1947 to London and North Eastern Railway and renamed Central No 4. To the British Transport Commission in 1949. To the British Transport Docks Board in 1961 and renamed Roa. Sold in 1973 to Maritime Commercial Enterprises Ltd, Greece and renamed Apollo. Scrapped in Greece in 1986.

=== Empire Porpoise ===
Empire Porpoise was a 7,592-GRT cargo ship which was built by Bethlehem Alameda, California. Ordered as War Rock for the British Shipping Controller. Completed in October 1918 as Invincible for USSB. The ship was one of five sister ships completed with direct electric drive. The U.S. Navy acquired and commissioned the ship on 17 October 1918 as USS Invincible (ID 3671) with assignment to the Naval Overseas Transportation Service (NOTS). After arrival in New York from California the ship made two trips to London with cargo before being decommissioned on 15 April 1919 and returned to the USSB. Sold in 1934 to Havemeyers & Elder, New York. To USMC in 1937, then to National Bulk Carriers Inc, New York in 1940. To MoWT in 1941 and renamed Empire Porpoise. Sold in 1946 to Marine Enterprises Ltd and renamed Chrysanthemum. Operated under the management of Lyros & Lemos Bros, London. Sold in 1950 to Compagnia Maritima Neptuno SA, Costa Rica and renamed Chryss. Sold in 1952 to Israel America Line Ltd, New York and renamed Athlit. Scrapped in October 1954 at Trieste, Italy.

=== Empire Portia ===
Empire Portia was a 7,058-GRT cargo ship which was built by Swan, Hunter & Wigham Richardson Co Ltd, Wallsend. Launched on 9 November 1942 and completed in January 1943. On 26 February 1943 she was damaged by bombs dropped by Junkers Ju 88 aircraft at 69°17′N 33°20′E while a member of Convoy JW 53. Repaired and returned to service. On 30 June 1944, Empire Portia hit a mine off Selsey Bill. Her engine room was flooded and she was taken in tow by LST 416. When off Ryde Pier the towline broke, causing LST 416 to lose control and collide with several other ships. Empire Portia ran aground north of the pier. On 1 July, she was beached and moved to a safer position two days later. Her back broke on 4 July, with her engines and boilers smashed. She was declared a total loss but considered floatable as her holds were watertight. Her guns and equipment were salvaged, an operation which was completed on 25 September. The aft section was salvaged at this time. On 30 April 1945, the forward section arrived at Briton Ferry for scrapping.

=== Empire Portland ===
Empire Portland was a 683-GRT hopper dredger which was built by William Simons & Co Ltd, Renfrew. Launched on 7 September 1944 and completed later that year. Sold in 1948 to the Federation of Malaya Government and renamed Morib. Sold in 1953 to Queensland Cement & Lime Co, Australia. Sold in 1967 to Maquarie Plant Pool Pty Ltd, Australia. Name removed from shipping registers this year and declared to be a non-seagoing vessel.

=== Empire Prairie ===
Empire Prairie was a 7,010-GRT cargo ship which was built by Lithgows Ltd, Port Glasgow. Launched on 2 December 1941 and completed in February 1942. Torpedoed on 10 April 1942 and sunk by U-654 east of Philadelphia.

=== Empire Pride ===
Empire Pride was a 9,248-GRT troopship which was built by Barclay, Curle & Co Ltd, Glasgow. Launched on 14 May 1941 and completed in September 1941. Served as a troopship in Madagascar, North Africa, Sicily and Southern France. In the early 1950s, she operated carrying troops to and from the Korean War. Withdrawn from service in 1954 and refitted as a 10,250 DWT cargo liner at Lübeck. Sold to Charlton Steamship Co Ltd and renamed Charlton Pride. Operated under the management of Chandris (England) Ltd. Sold in 1956 to Donaldson Brothers & Black Ltd, Glasgow and renamed Calgaria. Sold in 1963 to Compagnia Navigazione Fortaleza, Panama and renamed Embassy. Arrived on 27 June 1963 at Hong Kong for scrapping.

=== Empire Prince ===
Empire Prince was a 7,050-GRT cargo ship which was built by Caledon Shipbuilding & Engineering Co Ltd, Dundee. Launched on 31 March 1942 and completed in May 1942. Sold in 1945 to Clan Line Steamers Ltd and renamed Clan Angus. Sold in 1956 to Bullard, King & Co Ltd and renamed Umkuzi. Sold in 1959 to Clan Line Steamers Ltd and renamed Clan Angus. Scrapped in April 1962 at Hirao, Japan.

=== Empire Prize ===
Empire Prize was a 3,245-GRT tanker which was built by Baltimore Shipbuilding Corp. Completed in 1917 as Holden Evans. Sold in 1926 to European Shipping Co Ltd and renamed Olvigore. Renamed Oilvigor in 1927. Sold in 1930 to Tito Campanella Fu Pietro, Genoa and renamed Clelia Campanella. Scuttled on 8 April 1941 at Massowah, Italian Somaliland. Salvaged and seized by the Royal Navy. To MoWT and renamed Empire Prize. Sold in 1946 to Anglo-Saxon Petroleum Co Ltd and renamed Bankivia. Scrapped in October 1949 at Hong Kong.

=== Empire Progress ===
Empire Progress was a 5,249-GRT cargo ship which was built by Harland & Wolff Ltd, Glasgow. Completed in 1918 as tanker War Expert. Sold in 1919 to Anglo-Saxon Petroleum Co Ltd and renamed Anomia. sold in 1933 to A/S Brovigseil, Norway and renamed Andrea. Sold in 1938 to M Querci, Genoa. Converted to a dry cargo ship and renamed Mugnone. Seized on 10 June 1940 at Newcastle upon Tyne, to MoWT and renamed Empire Progress. Bombed on 22 May 1941 off The Needles, Isle of Wight and damaged, repaired and returned to service. Torpedoed on 13 April 1942 and sunk by U-402 south of Cape Race (40°29′N 52°35′W).

=== Empire Prome ===
Empire Prome was a 7,086-GRT cargo ship which was built by Shipbuilding Corporation Ltd, Newcastle upon Tyne. Launched on 1 March 1945 and completed in April 1945. Sold in 1947 to Kaye, Son & Co Ltd, London and renamed Martagon. Sold in 1959 to Ipar Transport Ltd, Turkey and renamed Mehmet Ipar. Scrapped in September 1970 in Istanbul.

=== Empire Prospect ===
Empire Prospect was a 7,331-GRT cargo ship which was built by Shipbuilding Corporation Ltd, Newcastle upon Tyne. Launched on 15 March 1945 and completed in June 1945. Sold in 1947 to Goulandris Brothers Ltd, London and renamed Ronald M Scobie. Renamed Plover in 1954. Sold in 1965 to Kowloon Carriers Inc and renamed Kowloon Venture. Operated under the management of Wah Kwong & Co (Hong Kong) Ltd. Arrived on 27 April 1969 at Kaohsiung, Taiwan for scrapping.

=== Empire Prospero ===
Empire Prospero was a 6,640-GRT cargo ship which was built by Bartram & Sons Ltd, Sunderland. Launched on 29 November 1942 and completed in March 1943. Sold in 1947 to W H Cockerline & Co Ltd, Hull and renamed Corinthic. Sold in 1951 to Marine Enterprises Ltd and renamed Marine Flame. Operated under the management of Lyras Bros. Sold in 1951 to Reliance Steamship Co SA, Panama and renamed Shahreza. Sold in 1952 to Compagnia Navigazione Acapulco, Panama and renamed Faustus. Operated under the management of S G Embiricos, London. On 6 November 1952, she came ashore 150 yards (140 m) off the North Breakwater, Hook of Holland during a storm. The next day, she was driven through the breakwater and capsized, almost blocking the Nieuwe Waterweg. Dredgers and explosives were used to settle the wreck into the sand and clear the channel.

=== Empire Protector (I) ===
Empire Protector was a 6,181-GRT cargo ship which was built by Cantiere Officine Savoia, Genoa. Completed in 1921 as Artena. Sold in 1928 to La Mer di Navigazione SA, Italy and renamed Cariddi, renamed Sebeto in 1932. Sold in 1935 to Società di Navigazione Polena, Genoa and renamed Pamia. Sailed from Sunderland, but captured at sea on 10 June 1940 by HMS Liffey, escorted to Methil, Fife. To MoWT and renamed Empire Protector. Torpedoed on 30 May 1941 and sunk by U-38 at 06°00′N 14°25′W.

=== Empire Protector (II) ===
Empire Protector was an 8,158-GRT tanker which was built by Furness Shipbuilding Co Ltd, Haverton Hill-on-Tees. Launched on 20 July 1944 and completed in October 1944. To Royal Fleet Auxiliary in November 1944 and renamed Wave Protector. Relegated to a storage hulk and jetty at Ras Hanzir, Malta in March 1958, replacing War Hindoo. Scrapped in August 1963 at Le Grazie, Italy.

=== Empire Prowess ===
Empire Prowess was a 7,058-GRT cargo ship which was built by William Gray & Co Ltd, West Hartlepool. Launched on 6 February 1943 and completed in April 1943. Sold in 1947 to J & C Harrison Ltd, London and renamed Harperley. Sold in 1955 to J A Billmeir & Co Ltd and renamed Elstead. Arrived on 22 October 1959 at Nagasaki, Japan for scrapping.

=== Empire Ptarmigan ===
Empire Ptarmigan was a 6,103-GRT cargo ship which was built by the G. M. Standifer Construction Company, Vancouver, Washington. Completed in 1919 as Abercos for the USSB. to MoWT in 1941 and renamed Empire Ptarmigan. To the Norwegian Government in 1942 and renamed Norelg. Operated under the management of Wallem & Co, Panama from 1946. Sold in 1948 to New Continental Steamship Co, China and renamed New Asia. Sold in 1950 to Wallem & Co, Panama and renamed Norelg. Sold in 1951 to Purple Star Shipping Co, China. Norelg was deleted from the shipping registers in 1957.

=== Empire Puffin ===
Empire Puffin was a LST (3) which was built by Barclay, Curle & Co Ltd, Glasgow. Launched in 1945 as LST 3015, then to Royal Navy as HMS Battler. To MoT during the Suez Crisis and renamed Empire Puffin. Operated under the management of Atlantic Steam Navigation Co Ltd. Management passed in 1960 to K C Irving, St John, New Brunswick. Arrived on 5 July 1966 at Spezia, Italy for scrapping.

=== Empire Puma ===
Empire Puma was a 7,777-GRT cargo ship which was built by Pusey & Jones Co, Gloucester, New Jersey. Completed in 1920 as Ethan Allen for USSB. Managed by Lykes Brothers-Ripley Steamship Co Inc from 1933. To MoWT in 1940 and renamed Empire Puma. Sold in 1946 to Williamson & Co Ltd, Hong Kong and renamed Inchwells. Sold in 1951 to Compagnia Navigazione Bellavist, Panama and renamed Point Clear. Sold in 1952 to Società Per Azioni Stellamaris, Italy and renamed Giacomo. Sold in 1954 to A Ravano, Italy and renamed Enrichetto. Sold in 1958 to Panamanian Oriental Steamship Co, Panama and renamed Silvana. Operated under the management of Wheelock, Marden & Co, Hong Kong. Scrapped in May 1959 in Hong Kong.

=== Empire Punch ===
Empire Punch was a 325-GRT coaster which was built by Richards Ironworks Ltd, Lowestoft. Launched on 31 January 1942 and completed in May 1942. Sold in 1947 to Lovering & Sons, Cardiff. Sold in 1951 to T G Irving Ltd, Sunderland and renamed Oakdene. Sold in 1967 to G & E Sealy, Sunderland.

=== Empire Purcell ===
Empire Purcell was a 7,049-GRT cargo ship which was built by William Gray & Co Ltd, West Hartlepool. Launched on 17 January 1942 and completed in March 1942. Bombed on 27 May 1942 and sunk at 74°00′N 26°08′E while a member of Convoy PQ 16.

=== Empire Pym ===
Empire Pym was a 2,370-GRT tanker which was built by Grangemouth Dockyard Co Ltd, Grangemouth. Launched on 27 November 1943 and completed in March 1944. Sold in 1946 to Refast Steamship Co and renamed Refast. Operated under the management of Stevinson Hardy Ltd, London. Sold in 1948 to Counties Ship Management Ltd. Sold in 1952 to Marcou & Sons Ltd, London. Sold later that year to Nolido Compagnia de Navigazione SA, Costa Rica and renamed Cassian. Sold in 1954 to Société Mazout Transports, France and renamed Mobilsud. Sold in 1964 to Société Anonyme Monegasque d'Armement et Navigation, Monaco and renamed Janson. Sold in 1966 to Sarda Bunkers SpA and rename Capo Mannu. Operated under the management of A Garolla & Co, Italy. Laid up at Naples in 1976 and scrapped in 1980.

== See also ==
The above entries give a precis of each ship's history. For a fuller account see the linked articles.

== Sources ==
- Caruana, Joseph (2012). "Emergency Victualling of Malta During WWII". Warship International. LXIX (4): 357–364. ISSN 0043-0374.
- Mitchell, W H; Sawyer, L A (1990). The Empire Ships (Second ed.). London, New York, Hamburg, Hong Kong: Lloyd's of London Press Ltd. ISBN 1-85044-275-4.
