= HMT Almond =

History

United Kingdom
- Name: HMT Almond
- Builder: Ardrossan Dockyard
- Launched: 22 May 1940
- Fate: Sunk 2 February 1941

General characteristics
- Class & type: Tree-class trawler
- Displacement: 530 long tons (540 t)
- Length: 164 ft (50.0 m) o/a; 150 ft (45.7 m) pp
- Beam: 27 ft 6 in (8.38 m)
- Draught: 10 ft 6 in (3.20 m)
- Propulsion: One triple expansion reciprocating engine, 1 shaft; 850 ihp (630 kW)
- Speed: 11.5 knots (21.3 km/h; 13.2 mph)
- Complement: 35
- Armament: 1 × QF 12-pounder 12 cwt naval gun

HMT Almond was a Tree-class naval trawler of the British Royal Navy. Almond was launched in 1940 and served in World War II, being sunk by a mine on 2 February 1941.

== Construction ==
Almond was laid down on 18 August 1939 at Ardrossan Dockyard, on the south west coast of Scotland. She was launched on 22 May 1940, and commissioned on 20 August that year. At this latter time some crew members were posted to Ardrossan. They were billeted in civilian accommodation, some were joined by their family.

== Service ==
She sailed to Tynemouth in order to have her armament fitted, then to Milford Haven, Wales, to commence minesweeping duties. She had a crew complement of 20, 19 of whom were killed when she was sunk by a mine on 2 February 1941, at about 2:00 pm, when returning to Falmouth, Cornwall after sweeping duties accompanied by another sweeper, which is currently unknown.

A dedication to HMT Almond can be seen at the RNPS Museum, Sparrows Nest, Lowestoft, Suffolk, England. This being the wartime headquarters of the RNPS. There is also a memorial in the adjacent park, Bell View.
