= Baffin =

Baffin may refer to:

== Places ==
- Qikiqtaaluk Region, formerly called the Baffin Region, an administrative and census region of Nunavut, Canada
- Qikiqtaaluk, Unorganized, formerly called Baffin, Unorganized, part of the Baffin Region census division
- South Baffin, a territorial electoral district (riding) for the Legislative Assembly of Nunavut
- Baffin Island, an Arctic island of Nunavut
- Baffin Bay, a sea between the Atlantic and Arctic oceans
- Baffin Mountains, a mountain range running along the northeastern coast of Baffin Island
- Baffin Region, a region of the Northwest Territories prior to division
- Baffin Bay (Texas), a bay in South Texas, an inlet of the larger Laguna Madre

== Other uses ==
- Baffin Island Current, an ocean current running south down the western side of Baffin Bay
- William Baffin, a 17th-century English navigator and discoverer
- HMS Baffin, a World War II Isles class trawler of the Royal Canadian Navy
- Blackburn Baffin, a torpedo bomber of the Fleet Air Arm

== See also ==
- Baffins, an administrative district of Portsmouth, UK
- HMS Ameer (D01), a World War II escort carrier of the Royal Navy, formerly known as USS Baffins
- MV TransAtlantic, formerly the MV Baffin Strait (T-AK-W9519), a container ship
