= HMT Islay =

British Royal Navy Isles-class armed trawler of the 2nd World War

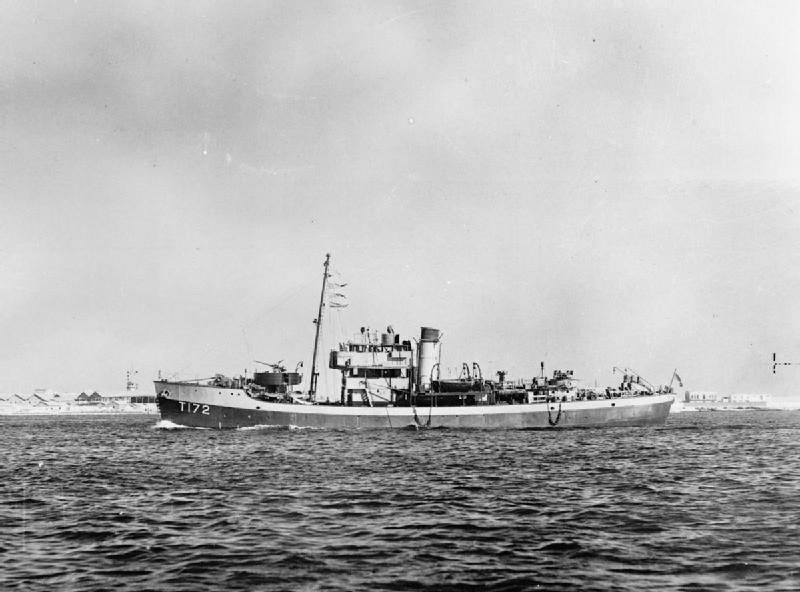

History

United Kingdom
- Name: HMT Islay
- Builder: Smiths Dock Company, South Bank, Middlesbrough
- Laid down: 18 November 1940
- Launched: 10 April 1941
- Commissioned: 17 June 1941
- Fate: Sold October 1946

France
- Name: Sainte Anne
- Fate: Disappeared 15 March 1950

General characteristics
- Class & type: Isles-class naval trawler
- Displacement: 545 long tons (554 t)
- Length: 164 ft (50 m)
- Beam: 27 ft 8 in (8.43 m)
- Draught: 11 ft 1 in (3.38 m) (mean)
- Propulsion: 1 triple expansion reciprocating engine, 1 shaft, 850 ihp (634 kW)
- Speed: 12 knots (22 km/h; 14 mph)
- Complement: 40
- Armament: 1 × 12-pounder gun; 3-4 × 20 mm Oerlikon AA guns; 30 × depth charges

HMT Islay (T172) was a British Royal Navy Isles-class armed trawler of the Second World War.

On 28 June 1942, Islay picked up 19 survivors from the British merchant steamer Zealand, which had been hit by two torpedoes from the German submarine U-97 in the Mediterranean Sea to the southwest of Haifa and had sunk with the loss of 14 crew members and gunners.

On 10 August 1942, Islay sank the Italian submarine Scirè in Haifa Bay while under the command of Lieutenant Commander John Ross of North Shields, who was awarded the Distinguished Service Cross for his actions. Scirè was carrying 11 Decima Flottiglia MAS commandos, who were intending to attack shipping in Haifa harbour by means of human torpedoes. Royal Air Force aircraft and coastal artillery also were involved in the sinking, which had been facilitated by Ultra intelligence. Scirè had previously launched human torpedo attacks on British naval units in Gibraltar and Alexandria, Egypt.

In October 1946, the ship was sold into commercial service. Operating under the French flag as Sainte Anne, she disappeared without trace in the Mediterranean Sea after a last communication while off the Balearic Islands on 15 March 1950.
