= HMT Hayling =

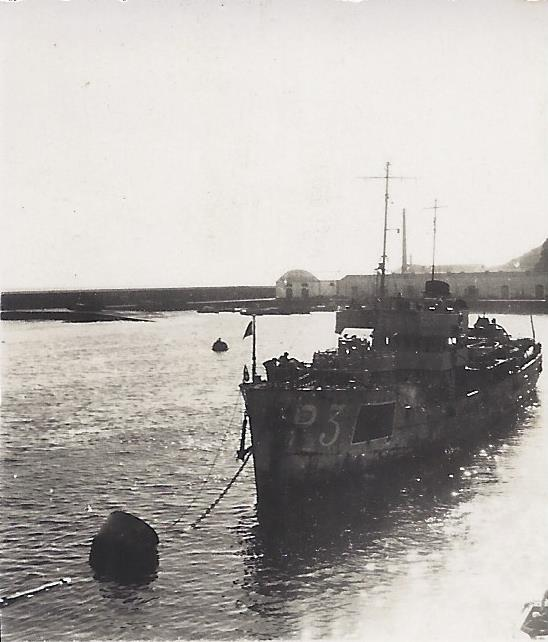
- HMT Hayling on loan to the Portuguese navy as P3 at Horta, Faial, Azores

History

United Kingdom
- Name: HMT Hayling
- Namesake: Hayling Island
- Ordered: 1 January 1942
- Builder: Cook, Welton & Gemmell, Beverley
- Laid down: 14 April 1942
- Launched: 17 August 1942
- Commissioned: 31 December 1942
- Fate: Lent to the Portuguese Navy from October 1943 to July 1945 and sold to Portugal on 11 June 1946

General characteristics
- Class & type: Isles-class trawler
- Displacement: 545 long tons (554 tonnes) standard; 770 long tons (780 tonnes) fullload
- Length: 164 ft (50 m) LOA
- Beam: 27 ft 8 in (8.43 m)
- Draught: 11 ft 1 in (3.38 m)
- Propulsion: 1 triple expansion reciprocating engine, 1 shaft, 850 ihp (630 kW)
- Speed: 12 knots (22 km/h; 14 mph)
- Complement: 35–40
- Armament: 1 × QF 12-pounder 12 cwt naval gun; 3 × Oerlikon 20 mm AA guns; 30 depth charges

HMT Hayling was one of 139 Isles-class trawlers built for the Royal Navy during the Second World War (others were built for the Royal Canadian Navy and Royal New Zealand Navy). She was lent to the Portuguese Navy in 1943 and sold to it in 1946.

== Service history ==
After being launched in August 1942 and commissioned the following December, Hayling served the Royal Navy under two commanding officers. Lieutenant G.B. Christie RNR commanded her until August 1943 followed briefly by Lieutenant G.F. Bryant RNVR until she was lent to the Portuguese Navy in October 1943.

Following Winston Churchill’s announcement on 12 October of an agreement with Portugal to allow the allies to use bases in the Azores, Hayling was one of eight armed trawlers lent to Portugal to reinforce the defence of the Azores and mainland Portugal. She was renamed P3 but returned to the United Kingdom after the end of hostilities in July 1945. She was subsequently sold to the Portuguese Navy on 11 June 1946 and renamed NRP Terceira, initially with pennant T, then M402 from 1951 and M393 from 1956 until she left service in 1957.
