= Liffey =

Liffey may refer to:

== Geography ==
- Liffey, Tasmania, a town in Tasmania, Australia
- River Liffey, a river in the East of Ireland (flowing through Dublin)
- Liffey River, Tasmania, a river in Tasmania, Australia

== Ships ==
- HMS Liffey, a number of ships of the Royal Navy
