= HMS Liffey =

A number of ships of the Royal Navy have borne the name HMS Liffey, after the Irish river. Another was planned but renamed before entering service:

- HMS Liffey was to have been a 36-gun fifth rate. She was renamed HMS Eridanus in 1812 and launched in 1813.
- HMS Liffey (1813) was a 50-gun fourth rate launched in 1813 and broken up in 1827.
- HMS Liffey (1856) was a 24-gun Liffey-class screw frigate of 3915 tons, launched in 1856. She became a store hulk in 1877, and was sold in 1903.
- HMS Liffey (1904) was a Foyle-type destroyer, launched in 1904, re-designated as a River-class destroyer in 1913 and sold for breaking up in 1919.
- HMS Liffey (T81), an Axe-class trawler.
