= Type 139 patrol trawler =

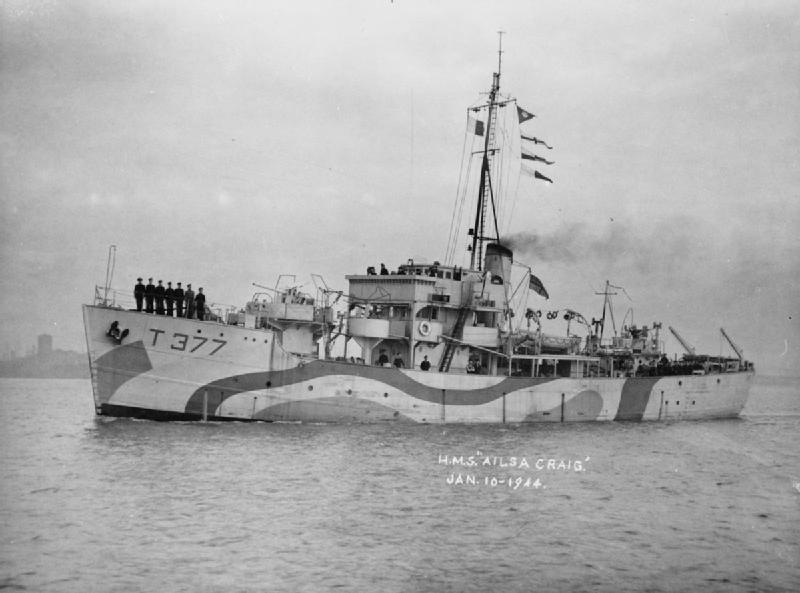
- HMT Ailsa Craig

Class overview
- Builders: G.T. Davie yard
- Operators: German Navy
- Built: 1942 (Royal Navy)
- In service: 1956 – mid 1970s (Federal German Navy)
- Completed: 2
- Retired: 2

General characteristics
- Type: Naval trawler
- Displacement: 545 tons
- Length: 164 ft (50.0 m)
- Beam: 27 ft 8 in (8.4 m)
- Draught: 11 ft 1 in (3.4 m) (mean)
- Propulsion: One triple expansion reciprocating engine, 1 shaft, 850 ihp (630 kW)
- Speed: 12 knots (22 km/h; 14 mph)
- Complement: 40
- Armament: Various light guns for training purposes

The Type 139 patrol trawler was a class of vessel used as a training ship by the Federal German Navy. Both vessels in the class were originally built for the Royal Navy in 1942 as Isles-class naval trawlers.

== History ==
The trawlers HMT Dochet and HMT Flint were launched in 1942 at the G.T. Davie & Sons yard in Lauzon, Quebec, and served in the anti-submarine warfare role to the end of World War II. Placed on the postwar disposal list, they were sold for mercantile use.

When the Federal German Navy was established in 1956, Dochet and Flint were acquired and classified as Type 139 patrol trawlers. Dochet was named Eider (A50) while Flint became Trave (A51). As operated by Germany, both ships were 54.00 metres (177 ft 2 in) long overall and 50 metres (164 ft) between perpendiculars, with a beam of 8.38 metres (27 ft 6 in) and a draught of 4.3 metres (14 ft).

Since the days of World War I, Germany had had a tradition of employing patrol trawlers. The type was classified before 1945 as a Vorpostenboot (literally, "outpost boat"). In the Federal German Navy, Eider and Trave were employed as fishery protection vessels and for training with light-caliber guns. Later they were used in radar instruction.

After two decades of service in the West German navy, Eider and Trave were discarded in the mid-1970s. Both Eider and Trave were sold for scrap.

== Bibliography ==
- Blackman, Raymond V. B. (1971). Jane's Fighting Ships 1971–72. London: Sampson Low Marston & Co. Ltd.
- Lenton, H.T.; Colledge, J.J. (1973). Warships of World War II. London: Ian Allan. ISBN 0-7110-0403-X.
