= Type 8105 naval trawler =

Chinese naval trawler

Class overview
- Operators: People's Liberation Army Navy

General characteristics
- Type: Type 8105
- Tonnage: 198 gross ton
- Length: 38.3 m (125 ft 8 in)
- Beam: 7.3 m (23 ft 11 in)
- Draft: 2.8 m (9 ft 2 in)
- Depth: 3.7 m (12 ft 2 in)
- Installed power: 400 hp
- Propulsion: Type 6260ZCZ marine diesel engine
- Speed: 10.5 kt
- Endurance: 20 days
- Complement: 18
- Electronic warfare & decoys: Rudimentary COMINT gear
- Armament: light arms

Type 8105 naval trawler is a Chinese auxiliary ship of the People's Liberation Army Navy (PLAN). Type 8105, Type 792 and Type 8154 naval trawlers have all received NATO reporting name FT-14 AIT class, meaning Fishing Trawler - 14 Auxiliary Intelligence-gathering Trawler. After retiring from their original role of a spy ship, Type 8105 naval trawlers have been converted to auxiliary minesweepers and survey vessels, and kept in operational reserve of the Chinese navy.

== Type 113 naval trawler ==
The origin of Type 8105 naval trawler is Type 113 naval trawler, which is a development of Shanghai Fishing (Hu-Yu, 沪渔) 401 series fishing trawler designed and built in 1954, the first fishing trawler built in the People’s Republic of China (PRC). The 401 series was based on Japanese fishing trawler design, and during its service, some of the design flaws had surfaced, thus in 1956, Qingxin Shipyard (求新造船厂) completed two rounds of major redesign efforts for improvement. The improvements of Type 113 over its predecessor included relocating some of the crew accommodations below the main deck, shortening the extension of the superstructure, and reduction of wind area, resulting in improved handling and stability in heavy seas without increasing the dimension of the ship.

Although originally designed as a fishing trawler, Type 113 first entered PLAN service as a spy ship due to the urgent need, it turned out that the fishing capability of this type was absolutely essential for completing its mission: PLAN did not have the needed underway replenishment capability until 2010s due to the very limited replenishment oiler it had, and this trawler, as with most of its successors, are too slow to shadow foreign warships, so they are deployed in-place on sea lanes to wait for their intended targets to pass, which required prolonged trips. However, this trawler often cannot carry enough provisions due to its small size, and thus while on deployment, crew had to perform regular fishing duty as a necessary means to supplement their food supply. Specifications:

- Length: 29.6 meter
- Beam: 6.76 meter
- Draught: 2.95 meter
- Displacement: 259.12 ton
- Speed: 8.5 kt
- Power: 250 hp
- Fuel capacity: 11 cubic meter
- Water capacity: 12.27 cubic meter

== Type 801 naval trawler ==
Type 113 trawler had been upgraded to Type 801 since 1961. Type 801 design drastically departed from the previous Chinese trawlers based on Japanese design characterized by the pilothouse located on afterdeck. Type 801 follow the US design where the pilothouse is located on foredeck, which has since become standard of all subsequent designs. Type 801 naval trawler is a trawler designed specifically for PLAN from the start, and as with its predecessor Type 113, the first customer is Chinese navy, though the type was much more successful as a fishing trawler in subsequent civilian use. Compared with the riveted hull, Type 801 has a welded hull. The single deck, single shaft trawler is powered by a Chinese designed & built 205 horsepower Type 6267 4-stroke vertical V6 engine with clutch.

Deployment of this type had revealed that despite improvements, Type 801 still shared the same shortcomings of its predecessor Type 113, and thus it neither entered mass production nor entered PLAN service in significant numbers, just like Type 113, but as with Type 113, it was kept in service after retiring from intelligence gathering mission when they were converted to auxiliary minesweepers and survey vessels to be kept in operational reserve. Specification:

- Displacement: 250 ton
- Propulsion: 205 hp
- Speed: 9.5 kt

== Type 8105 naval trawler ==
Type 8105 naval trawler is a derivative of Type 8105 fishing trawler. Designed and built in the 1980s, Type 8105 fishing trawler is powered by 400 hp Type 6260ZCZ diesel, with speed increased to 10.5 kt, and equipped with deep water anchor windlass. Propulsion efficiency is improved by adopting double speed gearbox matched with low speed propeller. Along with Type 8101 naval trawler, Type 8105 is one of the two naval trawlers PLAN ordered in large numbers, and both had been equipped with rudimentary COMINT gears in addition to hand held cameras.

Prior to the reform and opening up, it was relatively easy for PLAN to commandeer private vessels for military use in emergency situations, when everything was government-owned in planned economy, but this has become increasingly difficult to do after the reform due to private ownership. However, PLAN has to keep a very large number of auxiliary minesweepers to prepare for war, and as a result, when Type 8105 and earlier Type 113, Type 801 naval trawlers had retired from their intelligence gathering role, they were converted to auxiliary minesweepers and placed in operational reserve of PLAN. In addition, environmental problems have caused constant geological/geographical/hydrographical changes in Chinese waters, hence creating huge survey requirement, thus a number of these retired spy ships have also been converted to survey vessels to meet the extremely heavy hydrographic survey requirement. Specification:

- Length: 38.3 meter
- Beam: 7.3 meter
- Draught: 2.8 meter
- Displacement: 366.82 ton
- Gross tonnage: 198 ton
- Speed: 10.5 kt
- Power: 400 hp
- Crew: 18
- Endurance: 20 days

In late June 1979, Type 8105 naval trawler along with Type 8101 naval trawler participated in the shadowing former-Soviet aircraft carrier Minsk task force in South China Sea, a mission ended in failure because the slow speed of both types meant that they could not keep up with the targets even when targets were sailing at cruise speed. As a result, both Type 8101 and 8105 have to be deployed in-place on sea lanes to wait for their intended target to pass, like their predecessors when performing intelligence gathering duties. The intelligence gathering role of Type 8105 has been taken over by Type 8154 naval trawler in PLAN.
