= Tree-class trawler =

1939 class of British naval trawlers

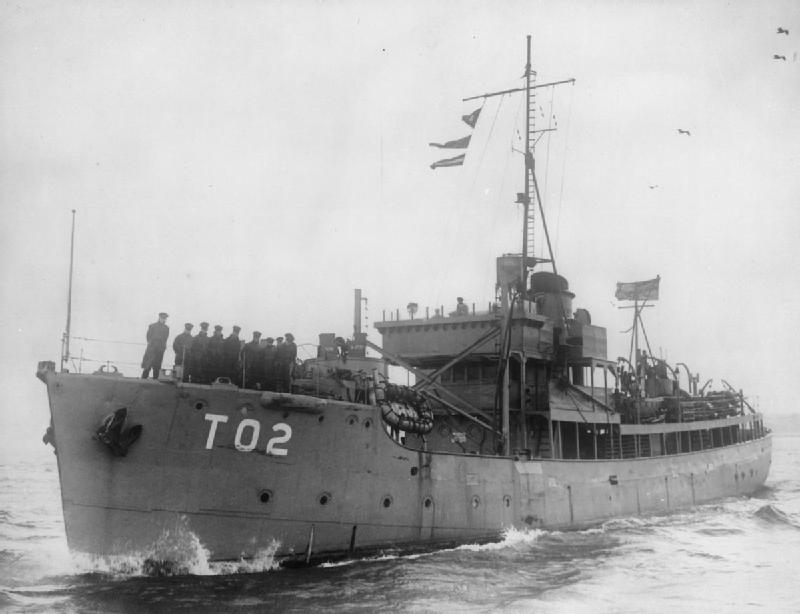
- HMT Acacia

Class overview
- Name: Tree-class trawler
- Operators: Royal Navy; Portuguese Navy
- Built: 1939–1945
- Completed: 20
- Lost: 6

General characteristics
- Type: Naval trawler
- Displacement: 545 tons
- Length: 164 ft (50 m)
- Beam: 27 ft 8 in (8.43 m)
- Draught: 11 feet i inch (mean)
- Propulsion: One triple expansion reciprocating engine, 1 shaft, 850 ihp
- Speed: 12 knots
- Complement: 40
- Armament: 1 × QF 12-pounder (76-mm) anti-aircraft gun; 3 × 20mm Oerlikon AA guns; 30 × Depth charges

Tree-class trawlers were a class of anti-submarine naval trawlers which served in the Royal Navy during the Second World War. They were nearly identical to the Isles-class trawlers, of which they are usually considered a subclass.

Six Tree-class trawlers were lost during the war: Almond, Ash, Chestnut, Hickory, Juniper and Pine. One, Mangrove, was transferred to Portugal in 1943.

By the end of 1946, only Olive and Walnut remained in service with the Royal Navy. Both were sold in 1948.

== Ships in class ==
- Built by Ardrossan Dockyard Company, Ardrossan, UK
  - Acacia – Launched 1940, sold 1946
  - Almond – Launched 1940, war loss 1941
- Built by Cochrane & Sons, Ltd., Selby, UK
  - Ash – Launched 1939, war loss 1941
  - Bay – Launched 1939, sold 1946
- Built by Cook, Welton & Gemmell, Beverley, UK
  - Birch – Launched 1939, sold 1946
  - Blackthorn – launched 1939, sold 1946
- Built by Ferguson Brothers, Ltd., Port Glasgow, UK
  - Juniper – Launched 15 December 1939, commissioned 9 March 1940; sunk in the Norwegian Sea, 8 June 1940.
  - Mangrove – Launched 4 April 1942, transferred to Portugal 1943 as Faial (P2)
- Built by Goole Shipbuilding & Repair Company, Goole, UK
  - Chestnut – Launched 1940, war loss 1940
  - Deodar – Launched 1940, sold 1946
- Built by Hall, Russell & Company, Aberdeen, UK
  - Olive – Launched 26 February 1940, sold 1948
  - Pine – Launched 1940, war loss 1944
- Built by A. & J. Inglis, Ltd., Glasgow, UK (part of Harland & Wolff)
  - Elm – Launched 1939, sold 1946
  - Fir – Launched 1940, sold 1946
- Built by Henry Robb, Ltd., Leith, UK
  - Hazel – Launched 1939, sold 1946
  - Hickory – Launched 1940, war loss 1940
- Built by Smith's Dock Company, Ltd., South Bank-on-Tees, UK
  - Rowan – Launched 1939, sold 1946
  - Walnut – Launched 1939, sold 1948 as Baltic refugee ship
  - Whitethorn – Launched 1939, sold 1946
  - Wistaria – Launched 1939, sold 1946

== See also ==
- Isles-class trawler
- Dance-class trawler
- Portuguese-class naval trawler
- Shakespearian-class trawler
- Trawlers of the Royal Navy
