= Type 792 naval trawler =

Chinese auxiliary ship

Class overview
- Operators: People's Liberation Army Navy

General characteristics
- Type: Type 792
- Draft: 3.04 m (10 ft 0 in)
- Electronic warfare & decoys: None
- Armament: light arms
- Armour: None
- Aircraft carried: None
- Aviation facilities: None

Type 792 naval trawler is a Chinese auxiliary ship of the People's Liberation Army Navy (PLAN), deployed as intelligence gathering spy ship. Type 792 and its predecessor Type 8154, along with Type 8105 naval trawlers have all received NATO reporting name FT-14 AIT class, meaning Fishing Trawler - 14 Auxiliary Intelligence-gathering Trawler.

== Type 8101 naval trawler ==
The origin of the Type 792 naval trawler can be traced back to the Type 8101 naval trawler, which is one of the follow–on types of the Type 8105 naval trawler. Due to the insufficient speed of Type 801, the Chinese navy needed a more powerful ship when performing intelligence gathering missions, and thus selected the 600 horsepower Type 8101 fishing trawler that was developed in 1975. Along with Type 8105 naval trawler, Type 8101 naval trawler has been produced in higher numbers than their predecessors, and both had been equipped with rudimentary COMINT gears in addition to handheld cameras. Specification:

- Speed: 11 kt
- Displacement: 200 ton

Before the reform and opening up, it was relatively easy for the PLAN to command private vessels for military use in emergencies when everything was government-owned in a planned economy, but this has become increasingly difficult to do after the reform due to private ownership. However, PLAN has to keep a very large number of auxiliary minesweepers to prepare for war, and as a result, when Type 8105 and earlier Type 113, Type 801 naval trawlers had retired from their intelligence gathering role, they were converted to auxiliary minesweepers and placed in operational reserve of PLAN. In addition, environmental problems have caused constant geological/geographical/hydrographical changes in Chinese waters, hence creating huge survey requirement, thus a number of these retired spy ships have also been converted to survey vessels to meet the extremely heavy hydrographic survey requirement.

In late June 1979, Type 8101 naval trawler along with Type 8105 naval trawler participated in shadowing former-Soviet aircraft carrier Minsk task force in the South China Sea, a mission that failed because the slow speed of both types meant that they could not keep up even when the targets were sailing at cruise speed. As a result, both Type 8101 and 8105 have to be deployed in-place on sea lanes to wait for their intended targets to pass, like their predecessors when performing intelligence gathering duties.

== Type 8154 naval trawler ==
Based on the feedback from civilian customers, the developer of the Type 8101 trawler greatly enhanced the design to improve the operability in heavy seas, resulting in a faster Type 8154 trawler completed in 1981. However, deployment in PLAN hands revealed that the 12.2 kt speed is simply too slow to shadow targeted foreign fleet at cruise speed. As a result, those Type 8154 trawlers that entered PLAN service were upgraded with 800 hp to reach a speed of 15.5 kt, and eventually, 960 hp engine to reach 16 kt speed. Some Type 8154 are also equipped with satellite communication antenna for long range missions. Specification:

- Length: 47 meter
- Beam: 8.2 meter
- Depth: 4 meter
- Draft: 3.04 meter
- Propulsion: 960 hp
- Displacement: 600 ton
- Speed: 16 kt
- Crew: 17

Due to its large size, unlike its retired predecessors that were only converted to hydrographic survey vessels and auxiliary minesweepers, when Type 8154 retired from intelligence gathering missions, it was also converted to auxiliary minelayers and ambulance ships in addition to the usual minesweeper and survey ships. Some of the retired Chinese naval Type 8154 trawlers were also transferred to PLA ground force to continue their intelligence gathering mission.

== Type 792 naval trawler ==
A decade after Type 8154 entered service, its successor Type 792 naval trawler entered the Chinese navy service. Due to automation, the larger Type 792 requires a smaller crew to man it. Design began in 1983, and passed acceptance certification in 1989. Unlike its predecessors that begun as a fishing trawler and then converted to the naval trawler, Type 792 was sole designed as a naval trawler, to begin with, and it was only later when the fishing version appeared. Specification:

- Draft: 3.04 meter
- Displacement: 600 ton

In comparison to its predecessors that served their intelligence-gathering role for several decades, some of Type 792 have already been converted to auxiliary minesweepers and placed in operational reserve relatively early due to the availability of larger spy ships.

== Ships ==
PLAN has begun to retire Type 8101 and 8154 from front-line spy missions, and convert them to perform mine warfare and hydrographic survey missions. Type 792 in active intelligence gathering missions have been identified, but there are also additional units performing mine warfare and hydrographic survey missions.

Type	NATO designation	Pennant No.	Name (English)	Name (Han 中文)	Commissioned	Displacement	Fleet	Status
Type 792 naval trawler	FT-14 AIT class	Zhan-Yu 819	Zhanjiang Fishing 819	湛渔 819	1989 onward	600 t	All fleets	Active
Type 792 naval trawler	FT-14 AIT class	Zhan-Yu 820	Zhanjiang Fishing 820	湛渔 820	1989 onward	600 t	All fleets	Active
Type 792 naval trawler	FT-14 AIT class	Zhan-Yu 821	Zhanjiang Fishing 821	湛渔 821	1989 onward	600 t	All fleets	Active
Type 792 naval trawler	FT-14 AIT class	Zhan-Yu 822	Zhanjiang Fishing 822	湛渔 822	1989 onward	600 t	All fleets	Active
Type 792 naval trawler	FT-14 AIT class	Zhe-Hai-Yu 626	Zhejiang Haining Fishing 626	浙海渔 626	1989 onward	600 t	All fleets	Active
Type 792 naval trawler	FT-14 AIT class	Zhe-Hai-Yu 627	Zhejiang Haining Fishing 627	浙海渔 627	1989 onward	600 t	All fleets	Active
Type 792 naval trawler	FT-14 AIT class	Zhe-Hai-Yu 628	Zhejiang Haining Fishing 628	浙海渔 628	1989 onward	600 t	All fleets	Active
Type 792 naval trawler	FT-14 AIT class	Zhe-Hai-Yu 629	Zhejiang Haining Fishing 629	浙海渔 629	1989 onward	600 t	All fleets	Active
Type 792 naval trawler	FT-14 AIT class	Various	Various	Various	1989 onward	600 t	All fleets	Active
Type 8154 naval trawler	FT-14 AIT class	Various	Various	Various	1981 onward	600 t	All fleets	Active
Type 8101 naval trawler	?	Various	Various	Various	1981 onward	200 t	All fleets	Active
