= Portuguese-class trawler =

1941 class of British naval trawlers

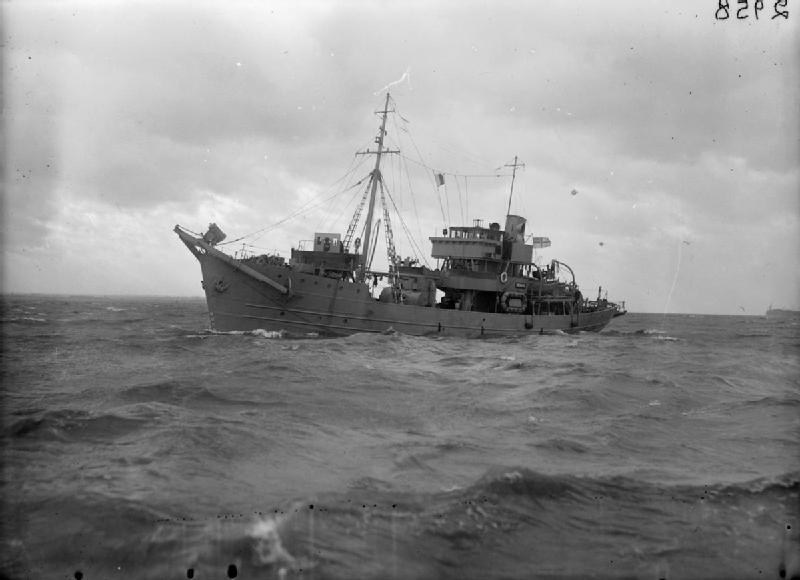
- HMT Promise in February 1943

Class overview
- Name: Portuguese-class naval trawler
- Builders: Estaleiros CUF (Lisbon); Arsenal do Alfeite (Lisbon); Estaleiros Mónica (Aveiro)
- Operators: Royal Navy; Royal Hellenic Navy
- Built: 1941–1943
- In commission: 1941–1946
- Completed: 12

General characteristics
- Type: Naval trawler
- Displacement: 525 tons
- Speed: 12 knots (22 km/h; 14 mph)
- Complement: 30
- Armament: 1 × 12 pdr AA gun

The Portuguese-class trawlers of World War II were naval trawlers, built in Portugal for the Royal Navy.

These vessels were built in several Portuguese yards, and offered by Portugal to the Royal Navy. This aid to the British war effort solicited protests by Nazi Germany, since, officially, Portugal was a neutral country.

After the war the ships were sold, most of them becoming mercantile vessels, some under the Portuguese flag. The former HMT Product went to the Royal Hellenic Navy.

== Ships in class ==
- Prong – Launched 1942, mercantile vessel Sjostkerk 1964
- Proof – Launched 1942, sold 1946
- Property – Launched 1942, mercantile vessel Portrush 1946, Property 1947 and Vaagness 1955
- Prophet – Launched 1942, sold 1946
- Protest – Launched 1941, sold 1946
- Prowess – Launched 1943, sold 1946
- Probe – Launched 1942, mercantile vessel Pólo Norte 1946
- Proctor – Launched 1942, mercantile vessel Arrábida 1946
- Prodigal – Launched 1941, sold 1946
- Product – Launched 1941, minesweeper repair ship 1943, Greek Navy Hermes 1946
- Professor – Launched 1942, mercantile vessel Algenib 1946
- Promise – Launched 1941, mercantile vessel Aldebaran 1946

== See also ==
- Isles-class trawler
- Tree-class trawler
- Shakespearian-class trawler
- Trawlers of the Royal Navy
