= HMNZS Inchkeith =

Royal New Zealand Navy ship

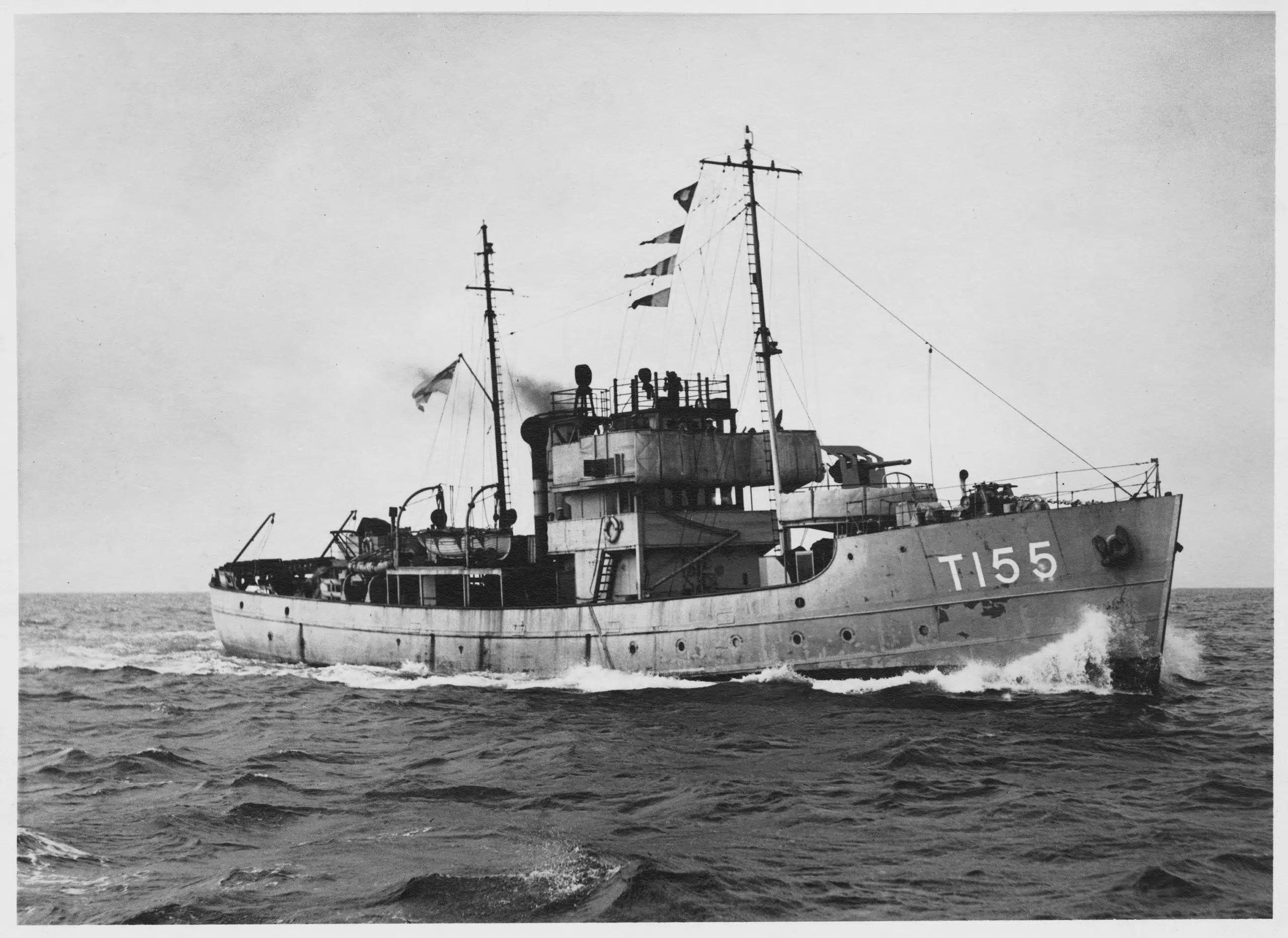

History

New Zealand
- Name: Inchkeith
- Namesake: Inchkeith, Firth of Forth
- Builder: John Lewis & Sons Aberdeen
- Laid down: 6 November 1940
- Launched: 10 July 1941
- Commissioned: 17 October 1941
- Decommissioned: 12 February 1946

General characteristics
- Class & type: Isles-class trawler
- Displacement: 782 tonnes full load
- Propulsion: 1 shaft triple expansion coal fired
- Speed: 8.5–10 knots (15.7–18.5 km/h; 9.8–11.5 mph)
- Complement: 40
- Sensors & processing systems: ASDIC
- Armament: 1 × 12 pdr single mounted gun; 3 × 20 mm single mounted gun; 2 × machineguns; 30 depth charges

HMNZS Inchkeith was an Isles-class minesweeper of the Royal New Zealand Navy. She was one of the first ships to be commissioned into the newly created Royal New Zealand Navy. She was bought alongside three other ships for a price of £65,000 each. On 15 March 1942 Inchkeith was involved with a collision with HMS Marsdale, damaging her superstructure.

During World War II, HMNZS Inchkeith worked escorting various convoys in both the Atlantic and Pacific theatres before transitioning to a primarily minesweeping role around the Hauraki Gulf and the Bay of Islands, although filling some escort duties.

Due to coal shortages Inchkeith along with her sister ships were laid up in October 1945, and by February 1946 the corvettes HMNZS Arabis and HMNZS Arbutus were fitted with minesweeping gear, and the four Isles-class ships were placed in reserve. By 1957, Inchkeith was declared surplus and were sold for scrapping in August 1958, and was broken up along with her sister ships at the Lighter Basin in Freemans Bay, Auckland in 1959.
