= HMS Baffin =

Minesweeper of the Royal Navy

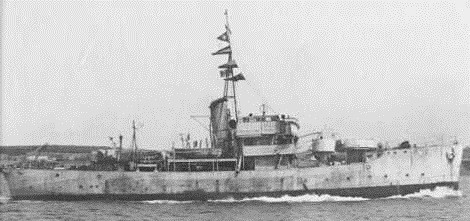
- HMS Baffin underway

History

United Kingdom
- Name: Baffin
- Namesake: Baffin Island
- Builder: Collingwood Shipyards, Collingwood
- Laid down: 14 October 1941
- Launched: 13 April 1942
- Commissioned: 20 August 1942
- Decommissioned: 20 August 1945
- Identification: IMO number: 5251628
- Honours and awards: Atlantic, 1944
- Fate: Loaned to Canada, 1942–45. Sold for mercantile service, 1945.

General characteristics
- Class & type: Isles-class trawler
- Displacement: 545 long tons (554 t) standard; 770 long tons (780 t) deep load
- Length: 164 ft (50 m) oa
- Beam: 27 ft 8 in (8.43 m)
- Draught: 11 ft 1 in (3.38 m)
- Propulsion: 1 shaft vertical triple expansion engine, 1-cylinder boiler 850 ihp (630 kW)
- Speed: 12 knots (22 km/h; 14 mph)
- Complement: 35–40
- Armament: 1 × QF 12-pounder 12 cwt naval gun; 3 × Oerlikon 20 mm AA guns; 30 depth charges

HMS Baffin was an Isles-class trawler of the Royal Navy. Constructed in Canada for the Royal Navy, the trawler was one of eight loaned to the Royal Canadian Navy during the Second World War. The vessel was mostly engaged in minesweeping duties out of Halifax, Nova Scotia. Following the war, Baffin was returned to the Royal Navy. The vessel was then sold into mercantile service. The vessel was broken up in 1983.

== Design and description ==
The Isles class were a series of anti-submarine trawlers constructed for the Royal Navy. A development of the earlier Basset class, 145 were constructed during the war. The Isles-class trawlers displaced 545 long tons (554 t) standard and 770 long tons (780 t) at deep load. They were 164 ft (50 m) long overall with a beam of 27 ft 8 in (8.43 m) and a draught of 11 ft 1 in (3.38 m).

The trawlers were propelled by one shaft driven by one vertical triple expansion engine powered by steam provided by a one-cylinder boiler. This created 850 indicated horsepower (630 kW) giving the ships a maximum speed of 12.25 knots (22.69 km/h; 14.10 mph). Baffin, being constructed in Canada, was armed with a single QF 12-pounder 12 cwt gun and three Oerlikon 20 mm cannons for anti-aircraft defence. (Note: "Cwt" is the abbreviation for hundredweight, 12 cwt referring to the weight of the gun.) They had a complement between 35 and 40 officers and ratings.

== Service history ==
The ship's keel was laid down by Collingwood Shipbuilding at Collingwood, Ontario on 14 October 1941. The ship was launched on 13 April 1942. The vessel was lent to the Royal Canadian Navy, but was never commissioned into it and was manned by a Royal Navy crew. The vessel was completed on 20 August 1942. Named for Baffin Island, as all the vessels loaned to Canada were named for Canadian islands, the ship saw service at Halifax performing anti-submarine duties.

Returned by the Royal Canadian Navy on 20 August 1945, the ship was sold for mercantile use on in October 1945. In 1947 the vessel was converted to a 453 GRT trawler under the same name, registered to Harbour Specialties Ltd out of London. In 1952 the vessel was sold to F.Osterwisch & Co KG and rebuilt with a new diesel engine, becoming the 494 GRT cargo ship Niedermehnen. The ship was sold in 1965 Hans Petersen and renamed Kellenhusen. In 1969, the vessel was sold to Hans Thiessen and renamed Kairos. The vessel became Theoxenia after being sold to Grigorios Karlovits & Fotini Papadopoulou in 1981. Theoxenia was purchased two more times, retaining her name. The ship was broken up in 1983, and eventually deleted from Lloyd's Register in 1995.
