= HMT Gulland =

Coordinates: 04°02′50″S 39°43′57″E

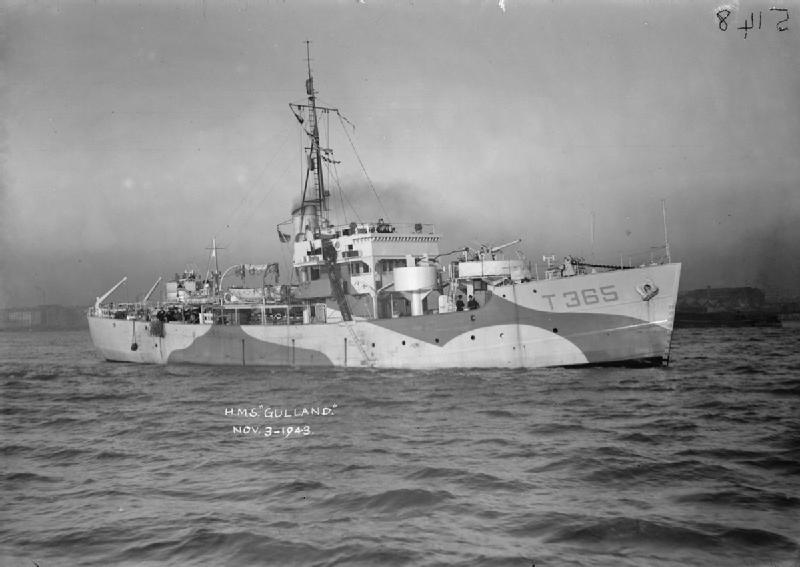
- HMT Gulland in November 1943

History

United Kingdom
- Builder: Cook, Welton & Gemmell, Beverley, Yorkshire, England
- Laid down: 30 April 1943
- Launched: 5 August 1943
- Commissioned: 30 October 1943
- Fate: Sold for mercantile use 1946; wrecked 13 April 1951

General characteristics
- Class & type: Isles-class trawler
- Displacement: 545 long tons (554 t)
- Length: 164 ft (50 m)
- Beam: 27 ft 8 in (8.43 m)
- Draught: 11 ft 1 in (3.38 m) (deep load)
- Installed power: 1 cylindrical boiler; 850 ihp (630 kW)
- Propulsion: 1 shaft; 1 triple-expansion steam engine
- Speed: 12.25 knots (22.69 km/h; 14.10 mph)
- Complement: 35–40
- Armament: 1 × single 12-pdr (76-mm) AA gun; 3 × single 20mm Oerlikon AA guns; 30 × depth charges

HMT Gulland was an Isles-class trawlers built for the Royal Navy during the Second World War for a variety of tasks, including anti-submarine patrol. She was launched placed on the disposal list after the war and sold to Belgian owners in March 1946.

== Design ==
The Isles-class ships were 164 feet (50.0 m) long, with a beam of 27 feet 8 inches (8.4 m) and a draught of 11 feet 1 inch (3.4 m) at deep load. They displaced was 545 long tons (554 t) at normal load, which increased to 770 long tons (780 t) at deep load. A single cylindrical boiler fed steam to a triple-expansion steam engine that drove a single propeller shaft. The engine was rated at 850 indicated horsepower (630 kW) which gave the ships a speed of 12.25 knots (22.69 km/h; 14.10 mph). They carried up to 183 long tons (186 t) of coal and had a complement of 35–40 officers and ratings.

== Postwar ==
The following year the ship changed hands and was renamed Henken and two years later sold to Arab Navigation & Transport Co. in Aden and renamed Arab Trader. On 13 April 1951 the ship grounded three miles north of Mombasa, Kenya, while on a voyage from Aden to Mauritius with a cargo of lentils. Within a day or two the heavy seas flooded the engine and boiler room, and the wreck settled on the reef with the main deck awash at high water. With a cargo that was now worthless and no one in Mombasa capable of salvaging the ship, she was abandoned as a total loss. The wreck broke up in the surf and at a later date the remains were demolished with explosives. What was left of the wreck was rediscovered in the 1970s on an extremely low tide in front of the Reef Hotel consisting of a pile of steel plate and machinery on the edge of the reef at its current location.

== Bibliography ==
- Campbell, N. J. M. (1980). "Great Britain (including Empire Forces)". In Chesneau, Roger (ed.). Conway's All the World's Fighting Ships 1922–1946. Greenwich, UK: Conway Maritime Press. pp. 2–85. ISBN 0-85177-146-7.
