= Isles-class trawler =

1939 class of British trawlers

Isles class
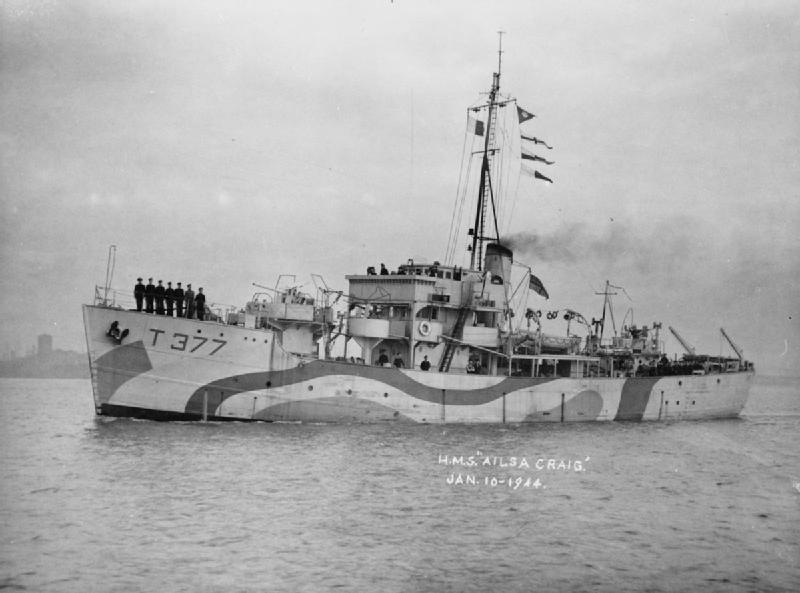
- HMT Ailsa Craig in 1944

Class overview
- Operators: Royal Navy; Royal Canadian Navy; Royal Malaysian Navy; Royal New Zealand Navy; Royal Norwegian Navy; Portuguese Navy; Italian Navy
- Subclasses: German Navy: Type 139 patrol trawler
- Built: 1939–1945
- Completed: 197 in four subclasses: Isles (145); Dance (20); Shakespearian (12); Tree (20)
- Lost: 23

General characteristics
- Type: Naval trawler
- Displacement: 545 long tons (554 t)
- Length: 164 ft (50 m)
- Beam: 27 ft 8 in (8.43 m)
- Draught: 11 ft 1 in (3.38 m) (mean)
- Propulsion: 1 triple expansion reciprocating engine, 1 shaft, 850 ihp (634 kW)
- Speed: 12 knots (22 km/h; 14 mph)
- Complement: 40
- Armament: See text

The Isles-class trawlers were a class of naval trawler used by the Royal Navy, Royal Canadian Navy and Royal New Zealand Navy during World War II.

The type comprised 197 vessels built between 1939 and 1945 in the nearly identical Isles, Dance, Tree and Shakespearian classes. Similar to the Castle-class trawlers of 1916–1918, though somewhat larger, they were mainly used on minesweeping and harbour defence duties. Most were armed with one 12-pounder gun (76 mm) and three or four 20 mm Oerlikon AA guns with 30 depth charges. In the Dance class a 4-inch AA gun (102 mm) was fitted in place of the 12 pdr, and there were six 20 mm Oerlikons in Annet, Bressay, Damsay, Fiaray, Foulness and Lindisfarne. Four of the trawlers were given "bird" names when converted to controlled minelayers in 1943–44: Blackbird (M15), Dabchick (M22), Stonechat (M25) and Whitethroat (M03). A total of 23 of these trawlers were lost during the war. Six trawlers were loaned to Canada in 1942–1945 and five to Norway in 1943–1945.

Postwar, 17 of the trawlers were disarmed as wreck disposal vessels: Bardsey (DV13), Bern (DV4), Caldy (DV5) Coll (DV6), Earraid (DV7), Fetlar (DV8), Flatholm (DV9), Graemsay (DV10), Lindisfarne (DV11), Lundy (DV12), Neave (DV14), Scalpay (DV15), Skomer (DV16), Steepholm (DV17), Switha (DV18), Tiree (DV19), and Trondra (DV20). At least five were employed as danlayers (laying and retrieving dan buoys during minesweeping operations): Imersay (J422), Sandray (J424), Shillay (J426), Sursay (J427) and Tocogay (J451). After decommissioning, Switha and Coll were converted to oil tank cleaning vessels for dockyard service in 1949–1950.

By 1949, there were 31 trawlers and four controlled minelayers in Royal Navy service, one controlled minelayer in the Royal Canadian Navy and four trawlers in the Royal New Zealand Navy. Sixteen were in service in the Italian Navy and six in the Portuguese Navy. Most of the surviving Royal Navy examples were discarded in the 1950s but a few remained until the 1960s. Two acquired post-war by the Federal German Navy remained in service as training vessels well into the 1970s, with one, Trave (ex-Dochet), resold to Turkey for further service in 1977.

== Builders ==
- Ardrossan Dockyard Company, Ardrossan, UK
- George Brown & Company (Marine) Ltd., Greenock, UK
- Cochrane & Sons, Ltd., Selby, UK
- Collingwood Shipbuilding, Collingwood, Ontario, Canada
- Cook, Welton & Gemmell, Beverley, UK
- John Crown & Sons Ltd., Sunderland, UK
- G.T. Davie & Sons, Lauzon, Quebec, Canada
- Ferguson Bros. Ltd., Port Glasgow, UK
- Fleming & Ferguson, Paisley, UK
- Goole Shipbuilding & Repair Company, Goole, UK
- Alexander Hall & Company, Aberdeen, UK
- Hall, Russell & Company, Aberdeen, UK
- A. & J. Inglis, Glasgow, UK
- Kingston Shipyards, Kingston, Ontario
- John Lewis & Sons, Aberdeen, UK
- Midland Shipyards, Midland, Ontario, Canada
- Henry Robb Ltd., Leith, UK
- Smiths Dock Company Ltd., South Bank-on-Tees, UK

== Ships in class ==
=== Royal Navy ===
Construction data for Isles-class trawlers of the Royal Navy
Ship	Builder	Laid down	Launched	Commissioned/Completed	Fate
Ailsa Craig	Cook, Welton & Gemmell		16 October 1943	24 December 1943	Sold 1946 and renamed Veslemoy. Renamed Toran in 1952. Lost 19 February 1955.
Annet	Cook, Welton & Gemmell		25 March 1943	19 June 1943	Became a Wreck disposal vessel in 1946. Still in use as diving Vessel for clearance diving in 1953. Sold 1957. Became fishery protection vessel FPV Ulva for Fishery Board for Scotland in 1958. Withdrawn from use 1971 and scrapped 1972.
Arran	Cook, Welton & Gemmell		16 November 1940	1 May 1941	Sold 1946 and renamed Assan Reis. Renamed Professor Henking 1952.
Balta	Cook, Welton & Gemmell		2 December 1940	19 May 1941	Sold 1946
Bardsey	Fleming & Ferguson		17 July 1943	15 September 1943	Still in service 1949 as wreck disposal vessel (DV13)
Benbecula	Cook, Welton & Gemmell		28 October 1943	13 January 1944	Sold 1946, bought by HM Customs and Excise and served as HMRC Vigilant
Bern	Cook, Welton & Gemmell		2 May 1942	9 October 1942	Still in service 1949 as wreck disposal vessel (DV4)
Biggal	Ferguson Bros.		4 December 1944		Sold 1946
Blackbird (ex-Sheppey)	Cook, Welton & Gemmell		20 February 1943		Converted to controlled minelayer (M15) 1943: still in service 1949
Bressay	Cook, Welton & Gemmell		20 January 1942	10 May 1942	Sold 1946
Brora	Cook, Welton & Gemmell		18 December 1940	11 June 1941	Grounded off Hebrides 6 September 1941
Bruray	Cook, Welton & Gemmell		16 May 1942	1 December 1942	Transferred to Portugal 1943 as Sam Miguel (P1)
Bryher	Cook, Welton & Gemmell		8 April 1943	20 July 1943	Still in service 1949
Burra	Goole S.B. & R. Co.		29 March 1941	18 July 1941	Transferred to Italy 1946 as DR 301
Bute	Goole S.B. & R. Co.		12 May 1941	15 September 1941	Sold 1946
Caldy	John Lewis & Sons		31 August 1943	14 December 1943	Still in service 1949 as wreck disposal vessel (DV5)
Campobello	Collingwood Shipbuilding		19 June 1942		War loss 16 Mar 1943.
Copinsay	Cochrane & Sons		12 April 1940	25 April 1941	Sold 1946
Crowlin	Cook, Welton & Gemmell		15 November 1943	28 January 1944	Sold 1946
Cumbrae	Cochrane & Sons		20 December 1940	17 May 1941	To Italy 1946 as DR 302
Damsay	George Brown & Co.		27 June 1942	3 September 1942	Still in service 1949
Dochet	G.T. Davie & Sons		26 June 1942	13 November 1942	Acquired by Federal German Navy postwar and renamed Trave (A51) as a Type 139 patrol trawler; sold to Turkey in 1977
Earraid (ex-Gruna)	John Crown & Sons		18 December 1941	11 May 1942	Later wreck disposal vessel (DV7); sold 1948
Eday	Cochrane & Sons		26 June 1941	22 November 1941	Loaned to Norway as Tromöy (i) 1943–44; sold into mercantile use 1946
Egilsay	Cook, Welton & Gemmell		7 February 1942	28 May 1943	To Italy 1946 as DR 306
Ensay	Cook, Welton & Gemmell		5 March 1942	15 June 1942	To Italy 1946 as DR 314
Eriskay	Fleming & Ferguson		28 August 1942	28 October 1942	To Portugal 1943 as P8
Fara	Cochrane & Sons		27 January 1941	28 June 1941	Sold 1946
Farne	Cook, Welton & Gemmell		22 April 1943	31 August 1943	Sold 1946
Fetlar	Cochrane & Sons		10 July 1941	13 December 1941	Still in service 1949 as wreck disposal vessel (DV8)
Fiaray	Goole S.B. & R. Co.		13 June 1942	27 September 1942	Sold 1946
Filla	John Crown & Sons		2 April 1942	28 August 1942	To Italy 1946 as DR 305
Flatholm	Cook, Welton & Gemmell		8 May 1943	20 August 1943	Later wreck disposal vessel (DV9); sold 1948
Flint	G.T. Davie & Sons		14 July 1942	13 November 1942	Acquired by Federal German Navy postwar and renamed Eider (A50) as a Type 139 patrol trawler
Flotta	Cochrane & Sons		13 February 1941	7 June 1941	Grounded off East Scotland 6 Nov 1941.
Foula	Cochrane & Sons		28 July 1941	3 January 1942	To Italy 1946 as DR 313
Foulness	John Lewis & Sons		23 March 1942	30 June 1943	Still in service 1949
Fuday	Cook, Welton & Gemmell		1 January 1944	24 March 1944	Sold 1946
Gairsay	Ardrossan Dockyard Co.		28 May 1942	2 September 1943	War loss 4 Aug 1944.
Ganilly	Cook, Welton & Gemmell		22 May 1943		War loss 5 July 1944
Gateshead	G.T. Davie & Sons		1 August 1942	11 May 1943	Sold 1947
Gillstone	Cochrane & Sons		19 July 1943	13 November 1943	Sold 1946
Gorregan	Ardrossan Dockyard Co.		30 December 1943	16 June 1944	Still in service 1949
Graemsay	Ardrossan Dockyard Co.		3 August 1942	16 June 1943	Still in service 1949 as wreck disposal vessel (DV10)
Grain	Cochrane & Sons		17 August 1943	16 November 1943	To Italy 1946 as DR 309
Grassholm	John Lewis & Sons		20 April 1943	17 August 1943	Sold 1946
Gruinard	John Crown & Sons		20 November 1943	1 March 1943	To Portugal 1943 as P7
Gulland	Cook, Welton & Gemmell	30 April 1943	5 August 1943	30 October 1943	Sold to mercantile use 1946; renamed Henken 1947 and Arab Trader 1949; wrecked north of Mombasa 13 April 1951. Boiler and wreckage still on reef.
Gweal (ex-Boreray)	Cook, Welton & Gemmell		17 June 1943	3 November 1942	Sold 1946
Hannaray	Cook, Welton & Gemmell		12 February 1944	3 May 1944	Sold 1946
Harris	Cook, Welton & Gemmell		29 January 1944	12 April 1944	Sold 1946
Hascosay	Cook, Welton & Gemmell		28 March 1944	26 May 1944	Sold 1946
Hayling	Cook, Welton & Gemmell		17 August 1942		To Portugal 1943 as Terceira (P3)
Hellisay	Cochrane & Sons		27 March 1944	17 July 1944	Sold 1946
Hermetray	Cochrane & Sons		11 April 1944	22 August 1944	Sold 1947
Herschell	G.T. Davie & Sons		5 November 1942	29 May 1943	Sold 1946
Hildasay	Cook, Welton & Gemmell		29 April 1941	30 September 1941	Grounded on Diani reef south of Mombasa, Kenya on 21 Jun 1945. Broke up during the next three months. Boiler visible at low tide.
Hoxa	Cook, Welton & Gemmell		15 January 1941	18 July 1941	Sold 1946
Hoy	Cook, Welton & Gemmell		1 February 1941	10 July 1941	Sold 1946
Hunda	Ferguson Bros.		4 February 1942	31 March 1942	Sold 1946
Imersay	Cochrane & Sons		21 August 1944	8 December 1944	Still in service 1949 as danlayer (J422)
Inchcolm	Cook, Welton & Gemmell		3 March 1941	25 July 1941	Sold 1946
Inchmarnock	John Lewis & Sons		25 August 1941	28 November 1941	Loaned to Norway as Karmöy 1944–45; sold mercantile 1946
Islay	Smith's Dock Co.		10 April 1941	17 June 1941	Sold 1946
Jura	Ardrossan Dockyard Co.		22 November 1941		War loss 7 Jan 1943
Kerrera	Ferguson Bros.		22 September 1941	31 October 1941	Loaned to Norway as Oksöy 1944–45; sold mercantile 1946
Kintyre	Ardrossan Dockyard Co.		21 October 1941	24 April 1942	Sold 1946
Kittern	Cook, Welton & Gemmell		28 August 1943	13 November 1943	Sold 1946
Lindisfarne	Cook, Welton & Gemmell		17 June 1943	17 August 1943	Still in service as wreck disposal vessel (DV11)
Lingay	Cochrane & Sons		6 September 1944	6 January 1945	Sold 1946
Longa	Cochrane & Sons		15 October 1943	13 February 1944	Sold 1946
Lundy	Cook, Welton & Gemmell		29 August 1942	15 January 1943	Still in service in 1949 as wreck disposal vessel (DV12)
Mewstone	Cook, Welton & Gemmell		16 September 1943	26 November 1943	Sold 1946
Minalto	Cook, Welton & Gemmell		3 July 1943	30 September 1943	Sold 1946
Mincarlo	Ardrossan Dockyard Co.		28 March 1944	24 October 1944	Loaned to Norway as Tromöy (ii) 1944–45, sold mercantile 1946
Mousa	Goole S.B. & R. Co.		1 June 1942	30 August 1942	To Italy 1946 as DR 311
Mull	Cook, Welton & Gemmell		27 March 1941	19 August 1941	Sold 1946
Neave	Cook, Welton & Gemmell		16 July 1942	25 November 1942	Still in service in 1949 as wreck disposal vessel (DV14)
Orfasy	A. Hall & Co.		17 March 1942		War loss 22 October 1943
Oronsay	Cochrane & Sons		30 October 1943	16 February 1944	Still in service 1949
Oxna	A. & J. Inglis		26 January 1943	18 July 1943	Sold 1946
Pladda	Cook, Welton & Gemmell		16 April 1941	19 August 1941	Sold 1946
Porcher	Midland Shipyards		26 May 1942	27 October 1942	Sold 1946
Prospect	Midland Shipyards		16 June 1942	4 November 1942	Sold 1946
Ronaldsay	Cochrane & Sons		14 February 1941	17 July 1941	Sold 1946
Rosevean	Cook, Welton & Gemmell		17 July 1943	16 October 1943	Sold 1946
Rousay	Goole S.B. & R. Co.		20 December 1941	17 April 1942	Sold 1946
Ruskholm	Goole S.B. & R. Co.		4 February 1942	10 May 1942	To Portugal 1945 as Baldaque da Silva
Rysa	Cochrane & Sons		15 March 1941	9 August 1941	War loss 8 Dec 1943
Scalpay	Cook, Welton & Gemmell		2 June 1942	20 October 1941	Later wreck disposal vessel (DV15); sold 1948
Shapinsay	Cochrane & Sons		29 March 1941	5 September 1941	Sold 1946
Shiant	Goole S.B. & R. Co.		9 August 1941	24 November 1941	Loaned to Norway as Jelöy 1944–45; sold mercantile 1946
Skokholm	Cook, Welton & Gemmell		29 September 1943	10 December 1943	Sold 1946
Skomer	John Lewis & Sons		17 June 1943	4 November 1943	Still in service 1949
Skye	Henry Robb		17 March 1942	22 July 1942	Still in service 1949
Sluna	Cochrane & Sons		14 April 1941	10 October 1941	Sold 1946
St. Agnes	John Lewis & Sons		19 May 1943	21 September 1943	Sold 1946
St. Kilda	A. Hall & Co.		29 May 1942	30 September 1942	Sold 1946
Staffa	Henry Robb		15 June 1942	31 August 1942	Sold 1946
Steepholm	John Lewis & Sons		15 July 1943	1 December 1943	Converted to wreck disposal vessel December 1945. Still in use as the last of 18 wreck disposal vessels in 1958.
Stroma	Hall, Russell & Co.		19 November 1941	22 January 1942	To Italy 1946 as DR 315
Stronsay	A. & J. Inglis		4 March 1942		War loss 5 Feb 1943
Switha	A. & J. Inglis		3 April 1942	15 June 1942	Later wreck disposal vessel (DV18); converted to oil fuel tank cleaning vessel 1949–50
Texada	Midland Shipyards		27 July 1942	17 November 1942	Sold 1946
Tiree	Goole S.B. & R. Co.		6 September 1941	12 January 1942	Still in service 1949 as wreck disposal vessel (DV19)
Trondra	John Lewis & Sons		4 October 1941	16 January 1942	Still in service 1949 as wreck disposal vessel (DV20)
Ulva	Cook, Welton & Gemmell		30 July 1942	15 December 1942	Sold 1946
Unst	Ferguson Bros.		28 May 1942	31 July 1942	To Italy 1946 as DR 303
Vatersay	Cochrane		13 November 1943	9 March 1944	Sold 1946
Wallasea	Henry Robb		22 April 1943	26 July 1943	War loss 6 Jan 1944.
Westray	John Lewis & Sons		4 November 1941	2 March 1942	Sold 1946
Whalsay	Cook, Welton & Gemmell		4 April 1942	28 August 1942	To Portugal 1943 as Santa Maria (P4)

The following 21 trawlers may be described as comprising the Repeat Isles class:

Construction data for Repeat Isles–class trawlers of the Royal Navy
Ship	Builder	Laid down	Launched	Commissioned/Completed	Fate
Calvay	Cook, Welton & Gemmell		29 November 1943	16 February 1944	Sold 1946
Canna	Cochrane & Sons		18 November 1940	3 March 1941	War loss 5 December 1942
Cava	Fleming & Ferguson		3 March 1941	3 March 1941	Sold 1946
Coll	Ardrossan Dockyard Co.		7 April 1942	21 September 1942	Later wreck disposal vessel (DV6); converted to oil fuel tank cleaning vessel 1949–50
Colsay	Cook, Welton & Gemmell		15 December 1943		war loss 1944
Dabchick (ex-Thorney)	Cook, Welton & Gemmell		9 March 1943		converted 1943 to controlled minelayer (M22); still in service 1949
Orsay	Cochrane & Sons		1 January 1945		still in service 1949
Rona	Cochrane & Sons		February 1945		still in service 1949
Sandray	Cook, Welton & Gemmell		5 October 1944	27 December 1944	Still in service 1949 as danlayer (J424)
Scaravay	Cook, Welton & Gemmell		22 October 1944	14 January 1945	Sold 1946
Sheppey (ex-Raasay)	Cook, Welton & Gemmell		1 April 1942	18 September 1942	Sold 1946
Shillay	Cook, Welton & Gemmell		18 November 1944	30 January 1945	Still in service 1949 as danlayer (J426)
Stonechat	Cook, Welton & Gemmell		22 August 1944		1944 as controlled minelayer (M25); still in service 1949
Sursay	Cook, Welton & Gemmell		16 December 1944	26 February 1945	Still in service 1949 as danlayer (J427)
Tahay	Cook, Welton & Gemmell	31 December 1944	23 March 1945		Still in service 1949
Tocogay	Cook, Welton & Gemmell		7 February 1945		still in service 1949 as danlayer (J451)
Trodday	Cook, Welton & Gemmell		3 March 1945		still in service 1949
Vaceasay	Cook, Welton & Gemmell		17 March 1945		still in service 1949
Vallay	Cook, Welton & Gemmell		10 April 1945		still in service 1949
Whitethroat	Welton & Gemmell		6 September 1944	1944	1944 as controlled minelayer (M03); still in service 1949
Wiay	Cook, Welton & Gemmell		26 April 1944		still in service 1949

=== Royal Canadian Navy ===
Construction data for Isles–class trawlers of the Royal Canadian Navy
Ship	Builder	Laid down	Launched	Commissioned	Paid off	Fate
Anticosti	Collingwood Shipbuilding		1 April 1942	8 August 1942		Sold 1946 to Norway as Guloy, to Sweden as Barbro and to Ethiopia as Giuseppina in 1968. Wrecked in Massawa in 1996.
Baffin	Collingwood Shipbuilding	14 October 1941	13 April 1942	20 August 1942	20 Aug 1945	Sold mercantile 1947; renamed Niedermehnen 1952, Broken up 1983.
Cailiff	Collingwood Shipbuilding		30 April 1942	19 September 1942	10 June 1945	Formerly HMS Cailiff (T276). Sold mercantile 1946; converted to Norwegian commercial trawler Borgenes. Laid up in 1990s, but proposals to restore her as a steam trawler were unfulfilled. Sold for demolition in Oct 2012
Ironbound	Kingston Shipyards		14 January 1942	5 October 1942		Sold 1946
Liscomb	Kingston Shipyards		23 March 1942	3 September 1942		Sold 1946
Magdalen	Midland Shipyards		7 March 1942	19 August 1942		Sold 1946
Manitoulin	Midland Shipyards		23 April 1942	8 September 1942		Sold 1946
Miscou	Collingwood Shipbuilding		1 June 1942	20 October 1942		Later HMS Campenia and HMS Bowell. Lent to RCN by RN. Sold to Bergen as Cleveland, 1946; to Nordlandslinjen and renamed Sigurd Hund, 1950; to Ålesund and renamed Vestfar, 1963; to Hans Hansen in 1971 to Faroe Islands. Broken up in 1974.

=== Royal New Zealand Navy ===
Construction data for Isles–class trawlers of the Royal New Zealand Navy
Ship	Builder	Laid down	Launched	Comm.	Fate
Inchkeith	John Lewis & Sons	16 November 1940	10 July 1941	24 October 1941	Still in service 1949
Killegray	Cook, Welton & Gemmell	24 January 1941	27 May 1941	14 October 1941	Still in service 1949
Sanda	Goole S.B. & R. Co.	23 December 1940	12 July 1941	3 November 1941	Still in service 1949
Scarba	Cook, Welton & Gemmell	6 March 1941	25 November 1941	25 June 1941	Still in service 1949

== See also ==
- Castle-class trawler
- Dance-class trawler
- Portuguese-class trawler
- Shakespearian-class trawler
- Tree-class trawler
- Type 139 patrol trawler
- Trawlers of the Royal Navy
- Minesweepers of the Royal New Zealand Navy
