= Axe-class trawler =

Class of naval trawlers used by the British Navy during WWII

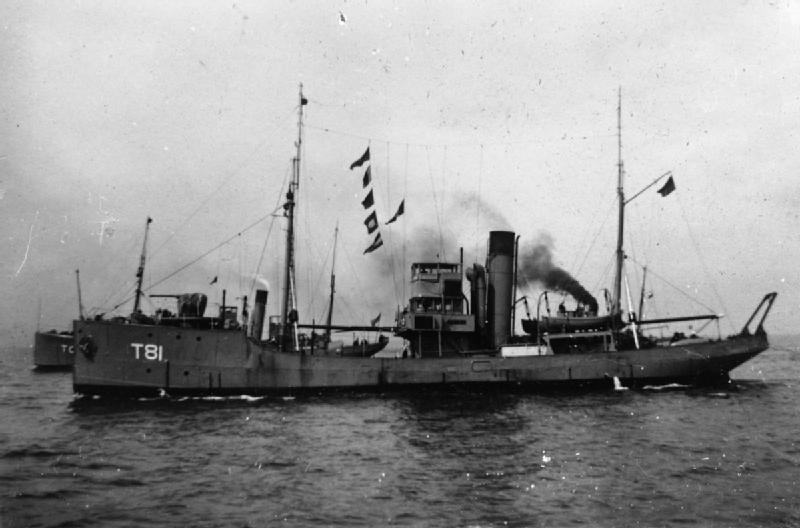
- HMT Liffey

Class overview
- Builders: Smiths Dock Company
- Operators: Royal Navy
- Built: 1916
- In commission: 1916–1946
- Completed: 4
- Retired: 4

General characteristics
- Type: Naval trawler
- Displacement: 390 long tons (400 t)
- Length: 130 ft (40 m) pp; 139 ft (42 m) oa
- Beam: 23.5 ft (7.2 m)
- Draught: 12 ft (3.7 m)
- Propulsion: One shaft reciprocating vertical triple expansion, 525 ihp (391 kW)
- Speed: 10.5 knots (19.4 km/h; 12.1 mph)
- Complement: 18
- Armament: 1 × 3-inch gun

The Axe class was a class of naval trawlers used by the Royal Navy of the United Kingdom during the Second World War.

The ships were acquired by the Royal Navy during the First World War. They were originally being built for the Empire of Russia, but were acquired by the Royal Navy after the Russian Revolution took the Russians out of the war.

There were four ships in the class:

- HMT Dee (T20). Previously known as HMT Battleaxe, and the Russian T16. Launched 19 June 1916. Sold into mercantile service as the Safir in 1946.
- HMT Garry (T63). Previously known as HMT Goldaxe, and the Russian T13. Launched 1 June 1916. Sold into mercantile service as the Garry in 1946.
- HMT Kennet (T78). Previously known as HMT Iceaxe, and the Russian T17. Launched 17 July 1916. Sold May 1946.
- HMT Liffey (T81). Previously known as HMT Stoneaxe, and the Russian T14. Launched 1 June 1916. Sold 1947.
