= Naval trawler =

Vessel built along the lines of a fishing trawler but fitted out for naval purposes

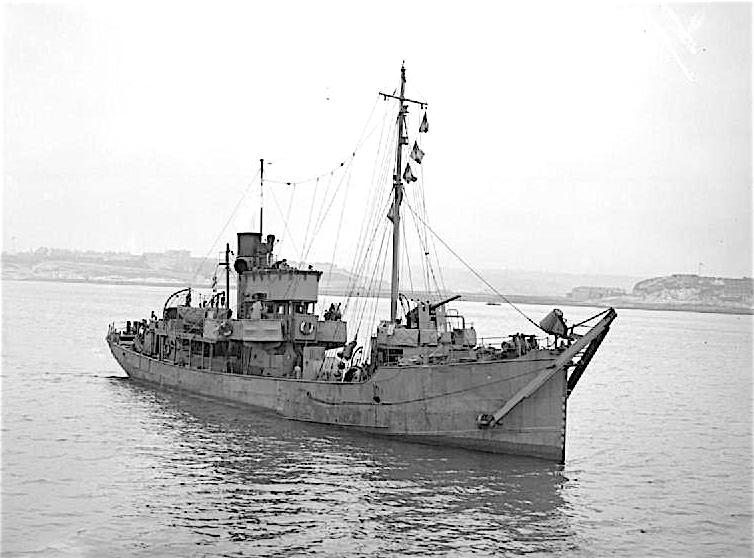
First World War naval trawler, HMT Swansea Castle

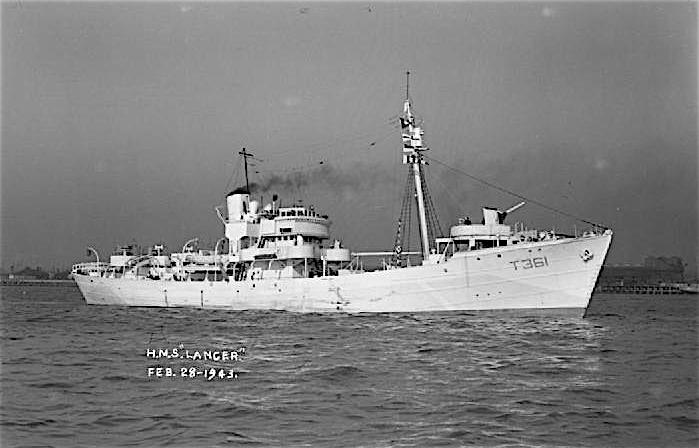
Second World War naval trawler, HMT Lancer

Naval trawlers are vessels built along the lines of a fishing trawler but fitted out for naval purposes; they were widely used during the First and Second World Wars. Some, known in the Royal Navy as "Admiralty trawlers", were purpose-built to naval specifications; others were adapted from civilian use. Fishing trawlers were particularly suited for many naval requirements because they were robust vessels designed to work heavy trawls in all types of weather, and had large clear working decks. A minesweeper could be created by replacing the trawl with a mine sweep. Adding depth charge racks on the deck, ASDIC sonar below, and a 3-inch (76 mm) or 4-inch (102 mm) gun in the bow equipped the trawler for anti-submarine duties.

== History ==
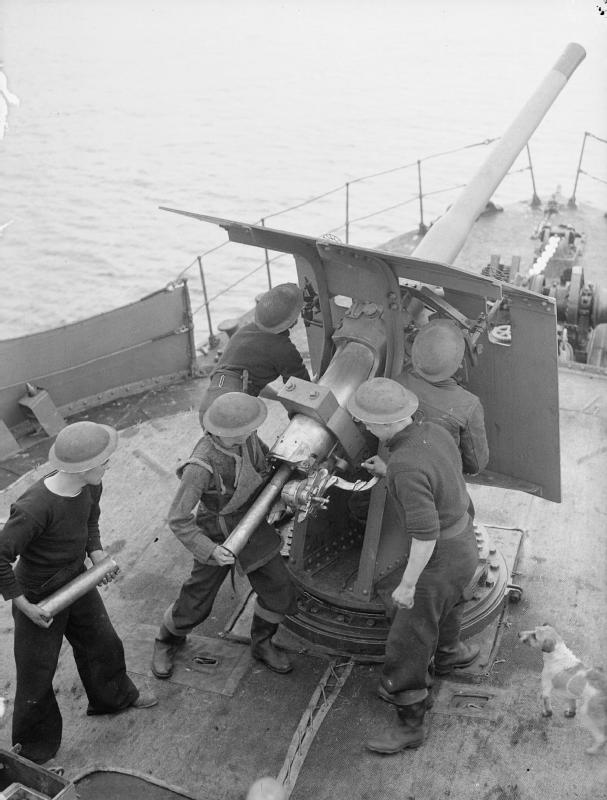
A naval trawler's gun crew mans a 12-pounder (76 mm) Mk V gun on the forecastle

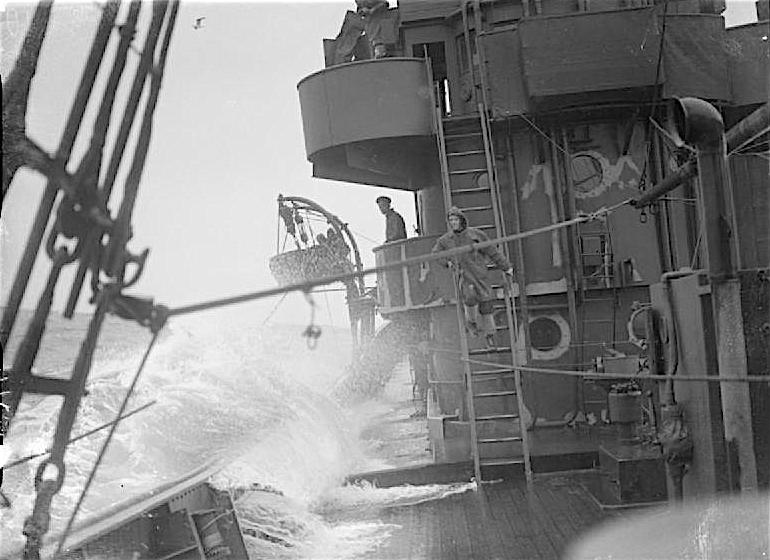
HMT Northern Sky pitching and rolling at slow speed along her patrol lines. Operating off Iceland, this trawler made the last attack of the Second World War on a U-boat.

The naval trawler is a concept for expeditiously converting a nation's fishing boats and fishermen to military assets. England used trawlers to maintain control of seaward approaches to major harbours. No one knew these waters as well as local fishermen, and the trawler was the ship type these fishermen understood and could operate effectively without further instruction. The Royal Navy maintained a small inventory of trawlers in peacetime, but requisitioned much larger numbers of civilian trawlers in wartime. The larger and newer trawlers and whalers were converted for antisubmarine use and the older and smaller trawlers were converted to minesweepers.

Armed trawlers were also used to defend fishing groups from enemy aircraft or submarines. The smallest civilian trawlers were converted to danlayers.

== Contemporary ==
Some nations still use armed trawlers for fisheries protection and patrol. The Indian Navy used naval trawlers for patrol duties during its involvement in the Sri Lankan civil war. North Korea has notoriously used armed trawlers as spy ships. In 2001 the Japanese sank a North Korean naval trawler after a six-hour battle known as the battle of Amami-Ōshima. Somali pirates have commandeered trawlers and armed them for attacking freighters off the Horn of Africa; the action of 18 March 2006 involved a naval trawler used by pirates.

== Trawler classes ==
- Axe class
- Basset class
- Battle class
- Castle class
- Dance class
- Fish class
- Fundy class
- Hill class
- Isles class
- Mersey class
- Military class
- Portuguese class
- Round Table class
- Shakespearian class
- Tree class
- Type 139

== Around the world ==
=== Belgium ===
In the aftermath of the First World War, the Belgian Corps de Marine purchased several British war surplus naval trawlers. They were operational during the 1940 Battle of Belgium, and one of them, A4, evacuated a large quantity of the National Bank's gold reserves to Britain shortly before Belgium's surrender.

=== Brazil ===
As with Portugal, the British Royal Navy had a number of trawler-type warships on order from Brazilian shipyards. With the declaration of war by Brazil against Germany in 1942 these vessels were transferred to the Brazilian Navy for anti-submarine and escort duties.

=== China ===
People's Liberation Army Navy (PLAN) uses naval trawlers as spy ships, as well as fishing when PLAN was allowed to conduct business activities to supplement the huge military expenditure. In addition, prior to reform and opening up, it was relatively easy for PLAN to commandeer private vessels for military use in emergency situations when everything was government-owned in planned economy, but this has become increasingly difficult to do after the reform due to private ownership. However, PLAN has to keep a very large number of auxiliary minesweepers to prepare for war, and as a result, when naval trawlers had retired from their intelligence gathering role, they were converted to auxiliary minesweepers and placed in operational reserve of PLAN. In addition, environmental problems have caused constant geological/geographical/hydrographical changes in Chinese waters, hence creating huge survey requirement, thus a number of these naval trawlers retired from their spy ship roles have also been converted to survey vessels to meet the extremely heavy hydrographic survey requirement. Chinese naval trawlers include Type 113, Type 801, Type 8105, Type 8101, Type 8154 and Type 792 naval trawlers.

=== France ===
The French Navy used trawlers requisitioned from civilian use in wartime. In the Second World War 480 trawler-type vessels were in service as auxiliary mine-sweepers, and a further 60 as auxiliary patrol vessels.

=== Germany ===
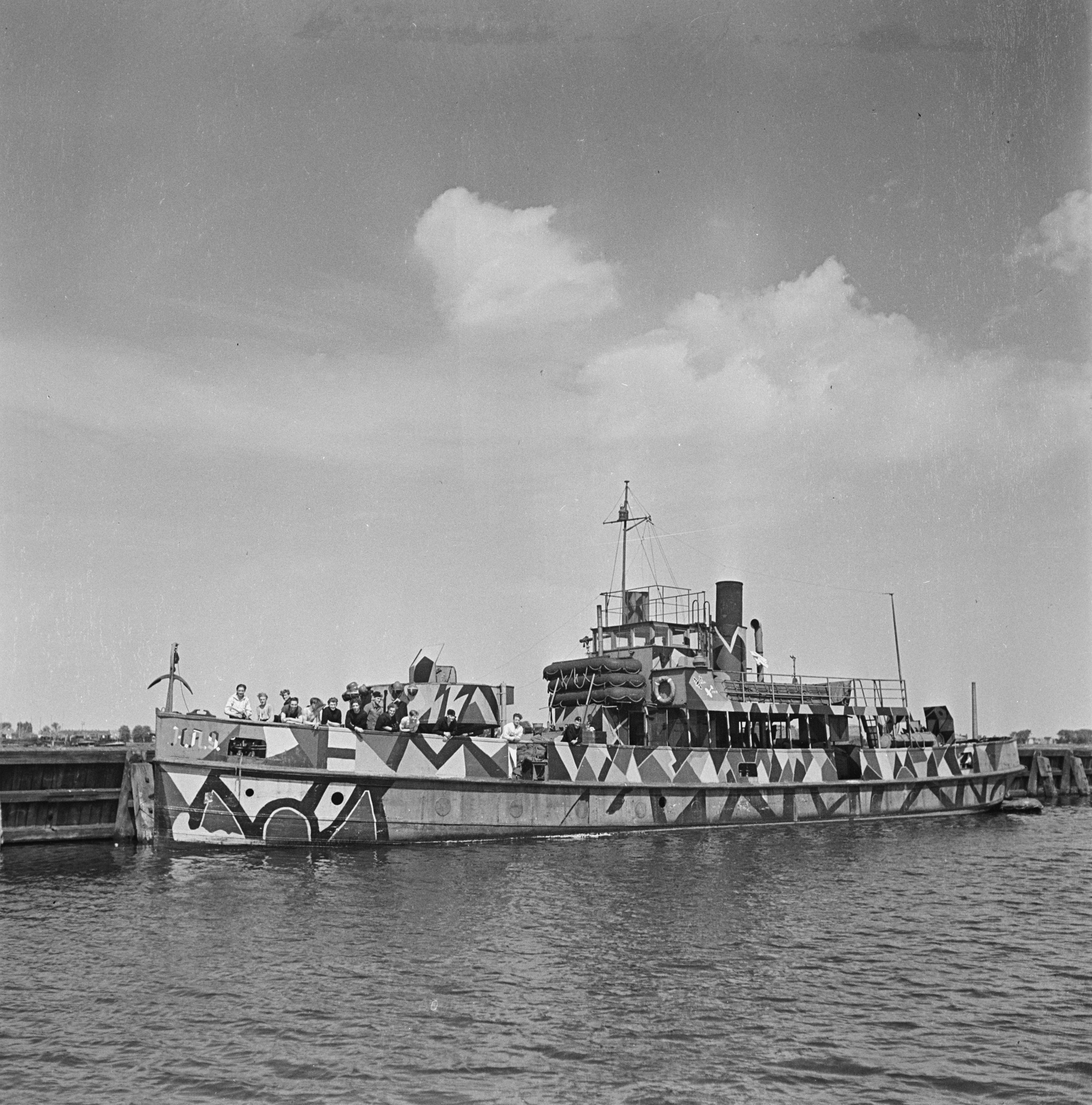
A German Vorpostenboot in dazzle camouflage; May 1945.

During the Second World War the Kriegsmarine operated trawlers as Vorpostenboot (outpost boats) and as weather ships; the Lauenburg was an example. It also used a large number of Kriegsfischkutter, trawlers built after the 24m long model "G" of the scientifically developed fishing cutter models (seven "Reichsfischkutter"-models A to- G), redesigned for naval uses such as anti-submarine warfare, but intended for conversion to fishing vessel after the war.

The weather trawler programme was a major disaster for the German war effort; it has even been suggested that it was one of the major contributors to Germany's defeat. The British Royal Navy monitored and pursued them relentlessly, capturing or sinking many. The reason was not just the strategic importance of weather data, but that the trawlers were carrying Enigma encryption machines and information, which when captured helped the British to crack the Enigma code, enabling them to read Germany's secret communications; the Germans discontinued the use of weather trawlers as they were too vulnerable, though they had not understood how their weather missions compromised Enigma.

=== India ===
The Royal Indian Navy operated trawlers mostly for wartime coastal defence; more than 50 Basset-class trawlers were ordered, but only 22 were completed, with four more being destroyed before completion when their shipyards were overrun by the Japanese in Burma. The remaining 25 were cancelled. They were used for coastal anti-submarine patrols and mine-sweeping duties.

=== Japan ===
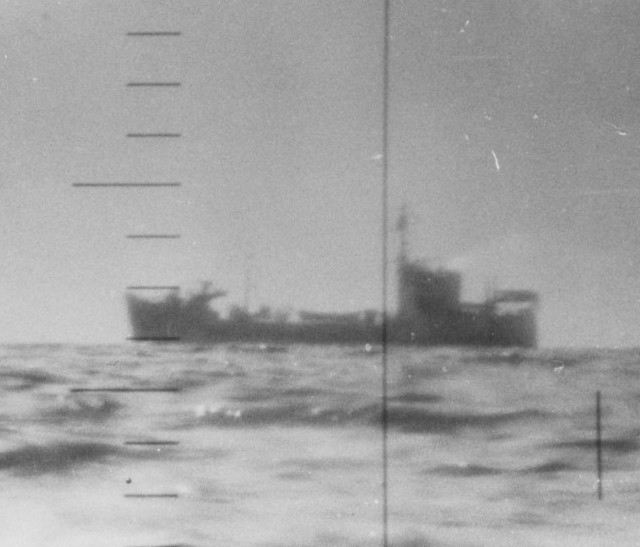
Japanese armed trawler seen through the periscope of USS Albacore 17 November 1944

As the Second World War progressed, Japan commandeered some fishing vessels for use as picket boats. To augment these, and to replace losses, the Imperial Japanese Navy also ordered a group of 280 picket boats, built on trawler lines but to Navy specifications. This was the No.1-class patrol boat, though ultimately only 27 were completed.

=== New Zealand ===
In World War II the Royal New Zealand Navy operated 35 minesweepers, including 20 purpose-built naval trawlers (thirteen Castle class, three Bird class, four Isles class), five converted fishing trawlers, and ten converted merchant vessels.

=== Norway ===
Norway had a large fishing and whaling fleet industry. For the Second World War the Royal Norwegian Navy used six converted whalers and 22 other fishing vessels as minesweepers, and a further ten as patrol craft. The Royal Norwegian Navy also used a German naval trawler captured in April 1940 and put into service as HNoMS Honningsvåg. After the occupation of Norway the Free Norwegian forces used fishing vessels for their clandestine Shetland bus operations in support of the Norwegian resistance.

=== Portugal ===
Though Portugal was neutral or non-belligerent throughout the Second World War, a number of steel and wooden-hulled vessels were built there to trawler design for the Royal Navy. These Portuguese-class naval trawlers were delivered in 1942, but further construction was halted after protests from Nazi Germany. Later, as Portugal became more closely involved with the western allies, Britain transferred a number of Isles-class trawlers to the Portuguese Navy as anti-submarine vessels.

=== Romania ===
Romania acquired three German KFK naval trawlers in 1943.

=== Spain ===
The Basque Auxiliary Navy operating autonomously in the Bay of Biscay on the side of the Spanish Republican Army during the early Spanish Civil War featured 7 naval trawlers.

=== United Kingdom ===
During the First World War, the Royal Navy operated 627 "Admiralty Trawlers" which had been purpose-built, purchased from foreign countries, or acquired as prizes. A further 1,456 trawlers were hired and operated, together with many other kinds of small vessel, by the Auxiliary Patrol. Trawlers were mainly employed in minesweeping, anti-submarine patrols and as boom defence vessels. 266 of the hired trawlers were lost while on active service.

Before and during the Second World War, the Royal Navy ordered many naval trawlers to Admiralty specifications. Shipyards such as Smiths Dock Company that were used to building fishing trawlers could easily switch to building naval versions. As a bonus, the Admiralty could sell these trawlers to commercial fishing interests after the end of the war. Many were sunk during the war, such as HMT Amethyst and HMT Force. In 1940, Lieutenant Richard Stannard was in command of the naval trawler HMT Arab when he won the Victoria Cross for his actions from 28 April to 2 May 1940 at Namsos in the Norwegian campaign. HMT Arab survived 31 bombing attacks in five days.

During the 1982 Falklands War, the Royal Navy hired a flotilla of five trawlers from Kingston-upon-Hull, which were hastily converted to minesweepers, as the Ton-class minesweepers then in service were unsuitable for the long voyage and the heavy seas of the South Atlantic. Although employed with the Task Force on various other auxiliary duties, after the Argentine surrender, the trawlers were able to sweep ten naval mines, which had been successfully laid in Port Stanley harbour; eleven others had failed to deploy or had broken adrift.

=== United States ===
The US Navy generally favoured custom-built warships to civilian conversions, but in the first months of World War II the acute shortage of vessels for coastal defence and anti-submarine work led to the formation of a mosquito fleet. Twenty steel-hulled and more than 40 wooden-hulled trawlers were commissioned as auxiliary minesweepers (AM designation), but confined to coastal waters and not rated for offensive or convoy escort duties. A further 70 tuna clippers were called up as minesweepers (Amc designation), ten as harbour patrol craft (YP) and 50 as coastal transports (APC). The United States Coast Guard requisitioned ten Boston fishing trawlers for the Greenland Patrol.

== Gallery ==
Daily life aboard a First World War naval trawler

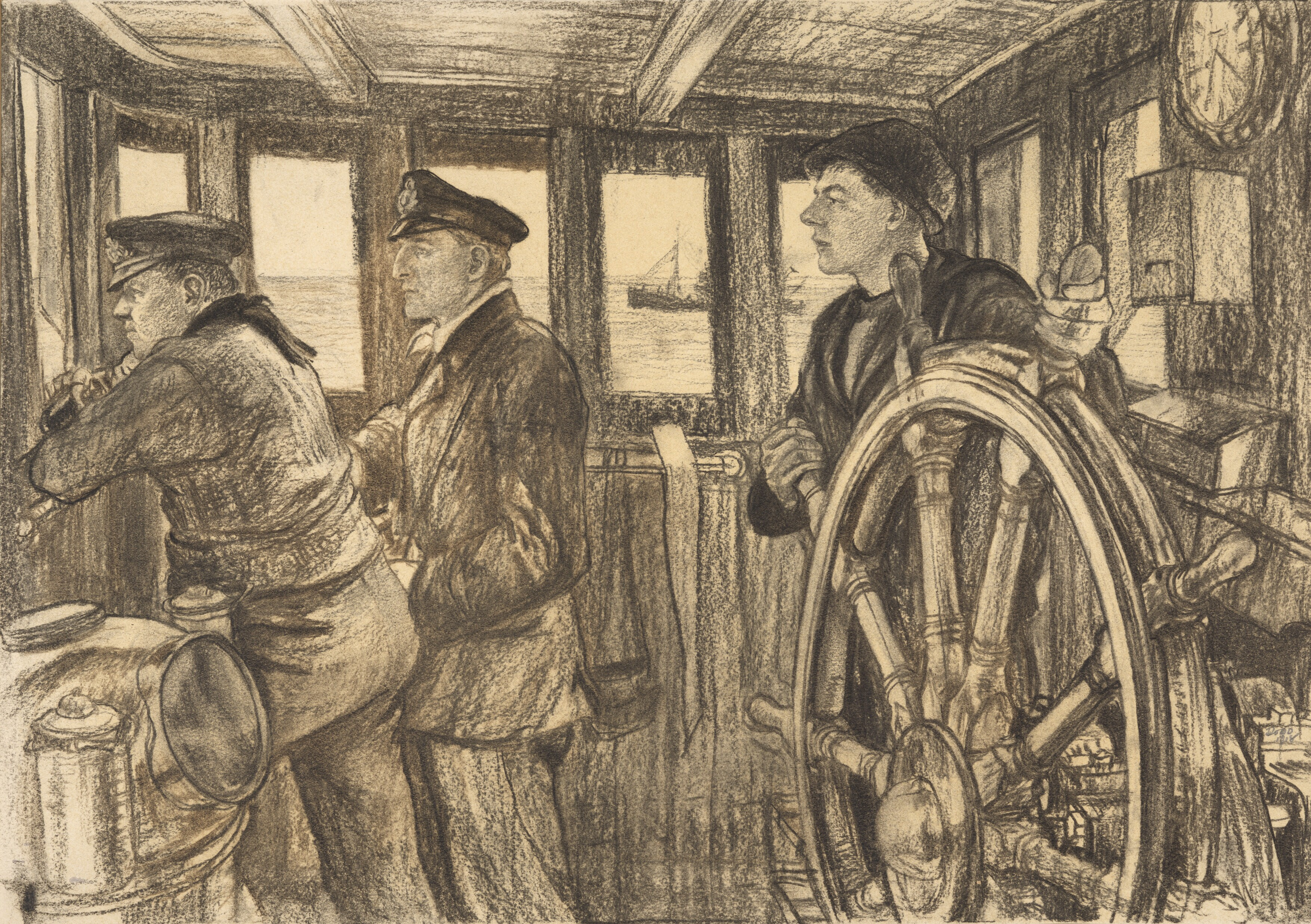
Wheelhouse of a naval trawler

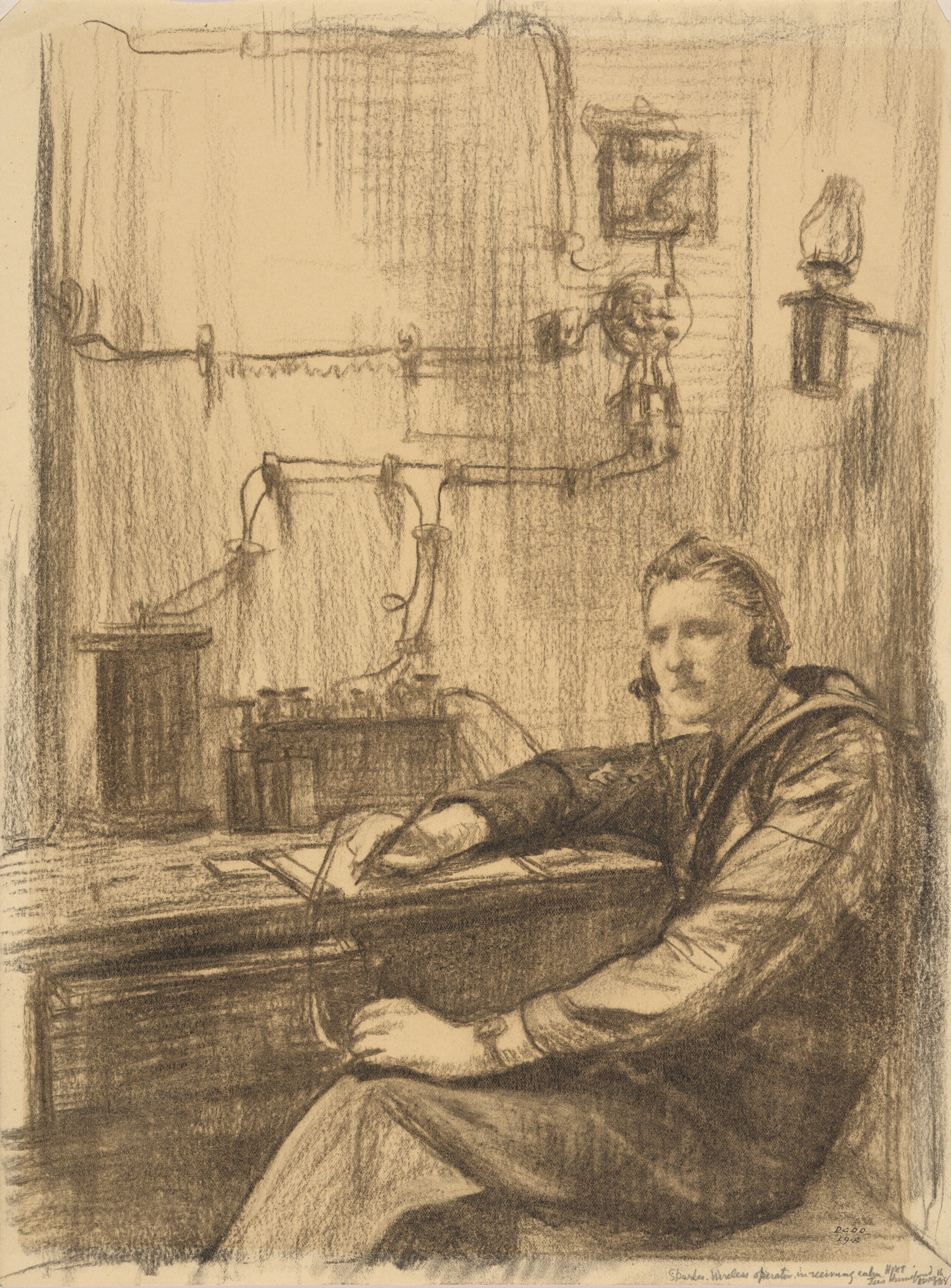
Wireless operator

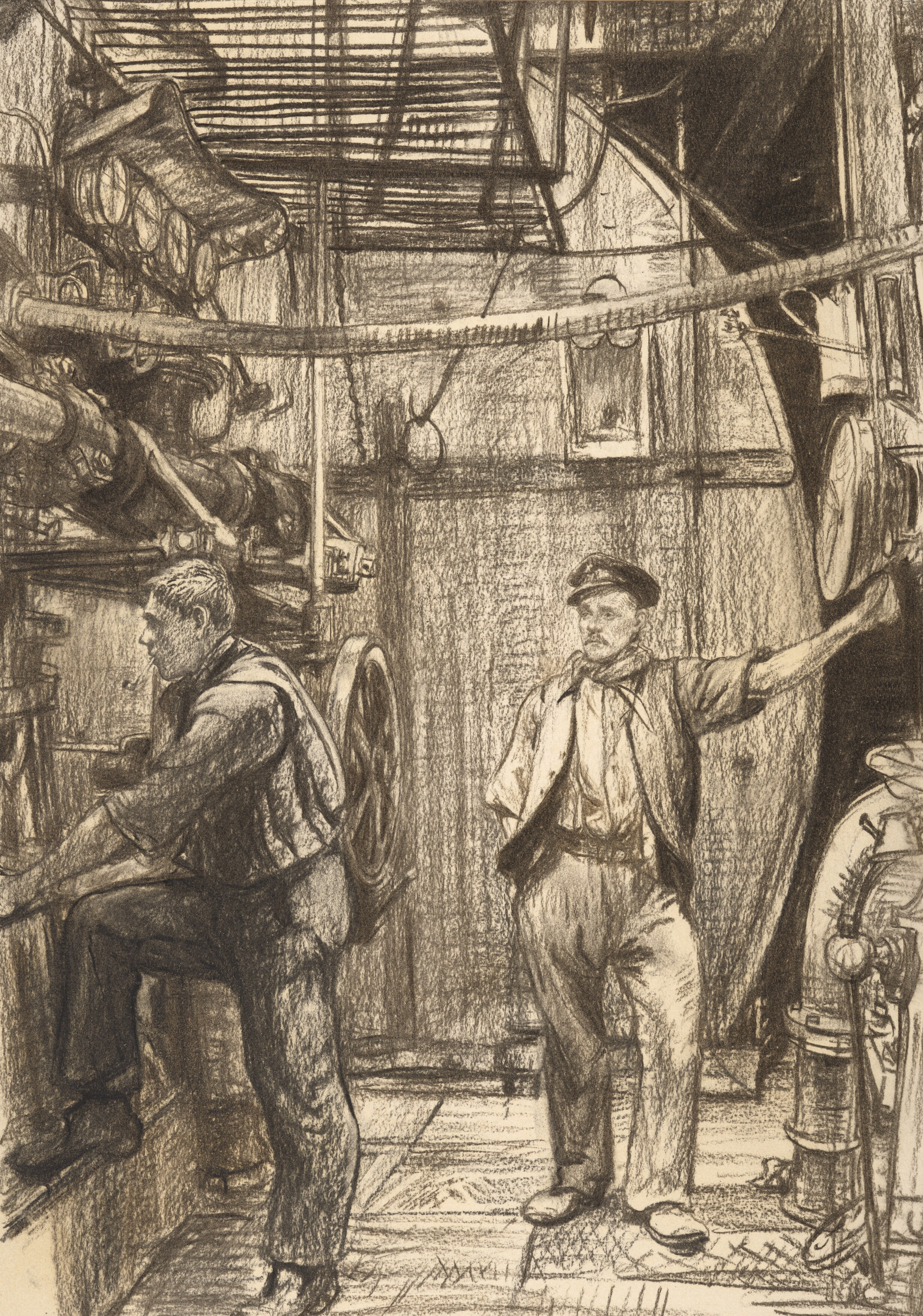
Engine room

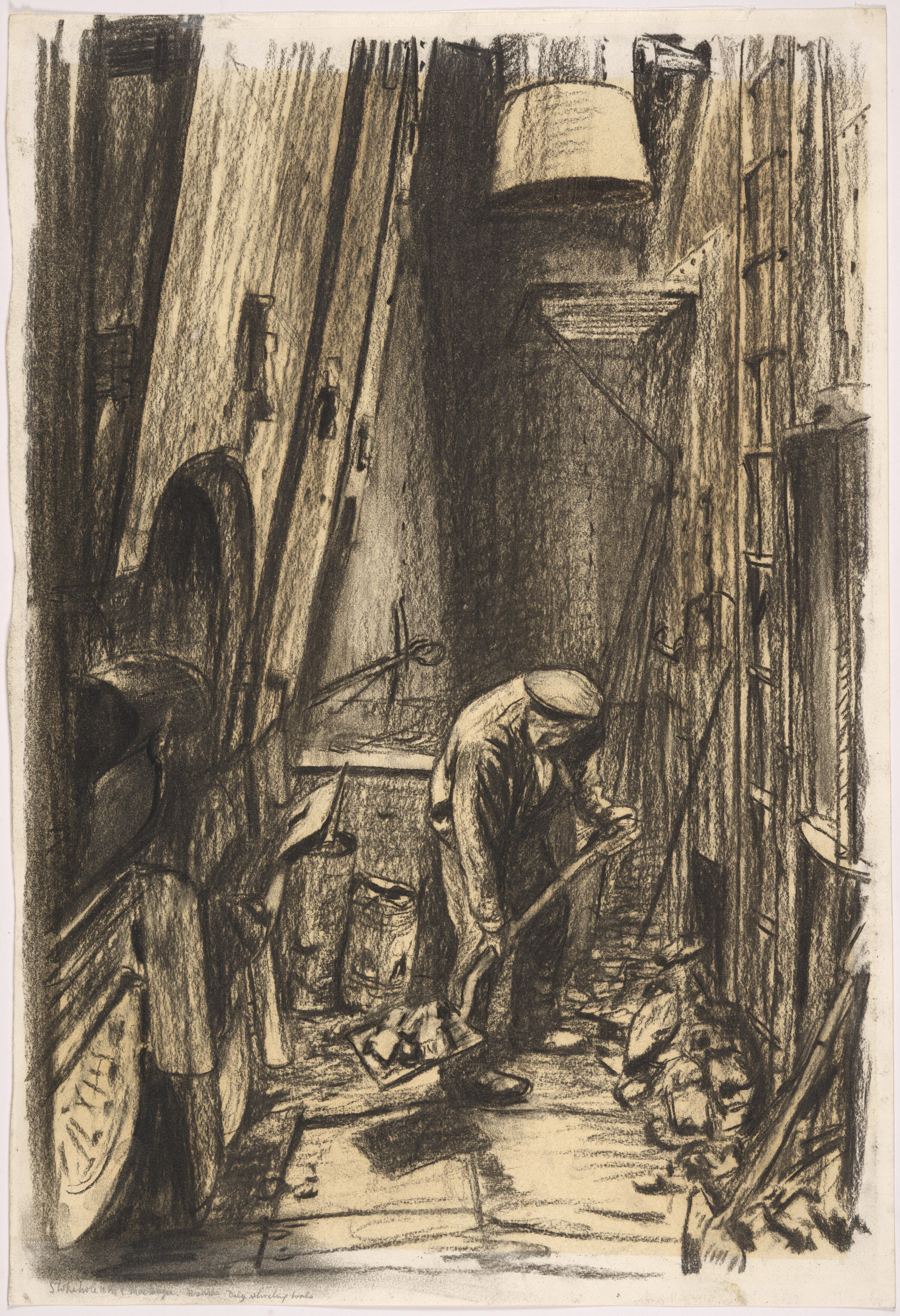
Stoker shovelling coal from a bunker

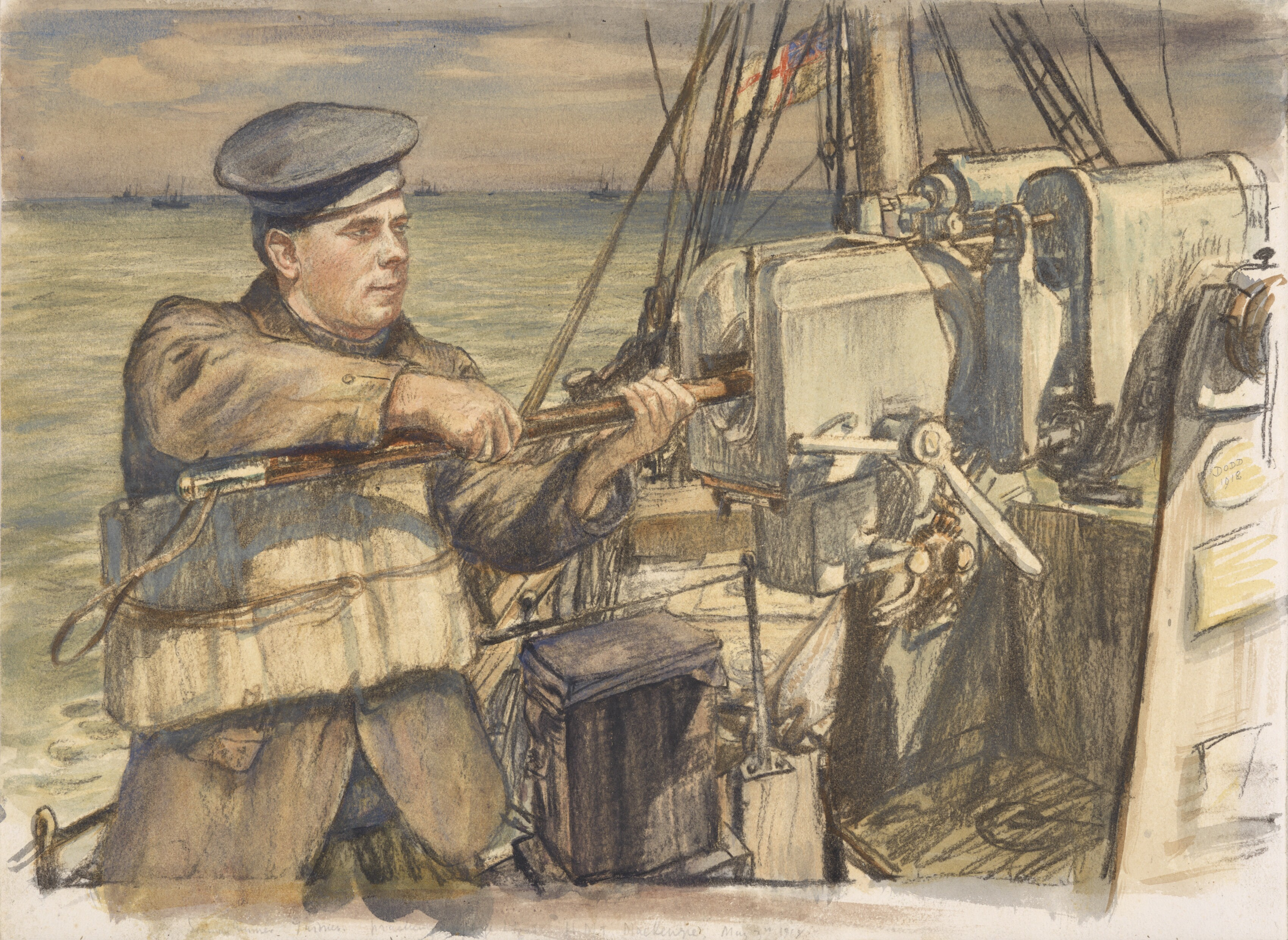
Cleaning the gun

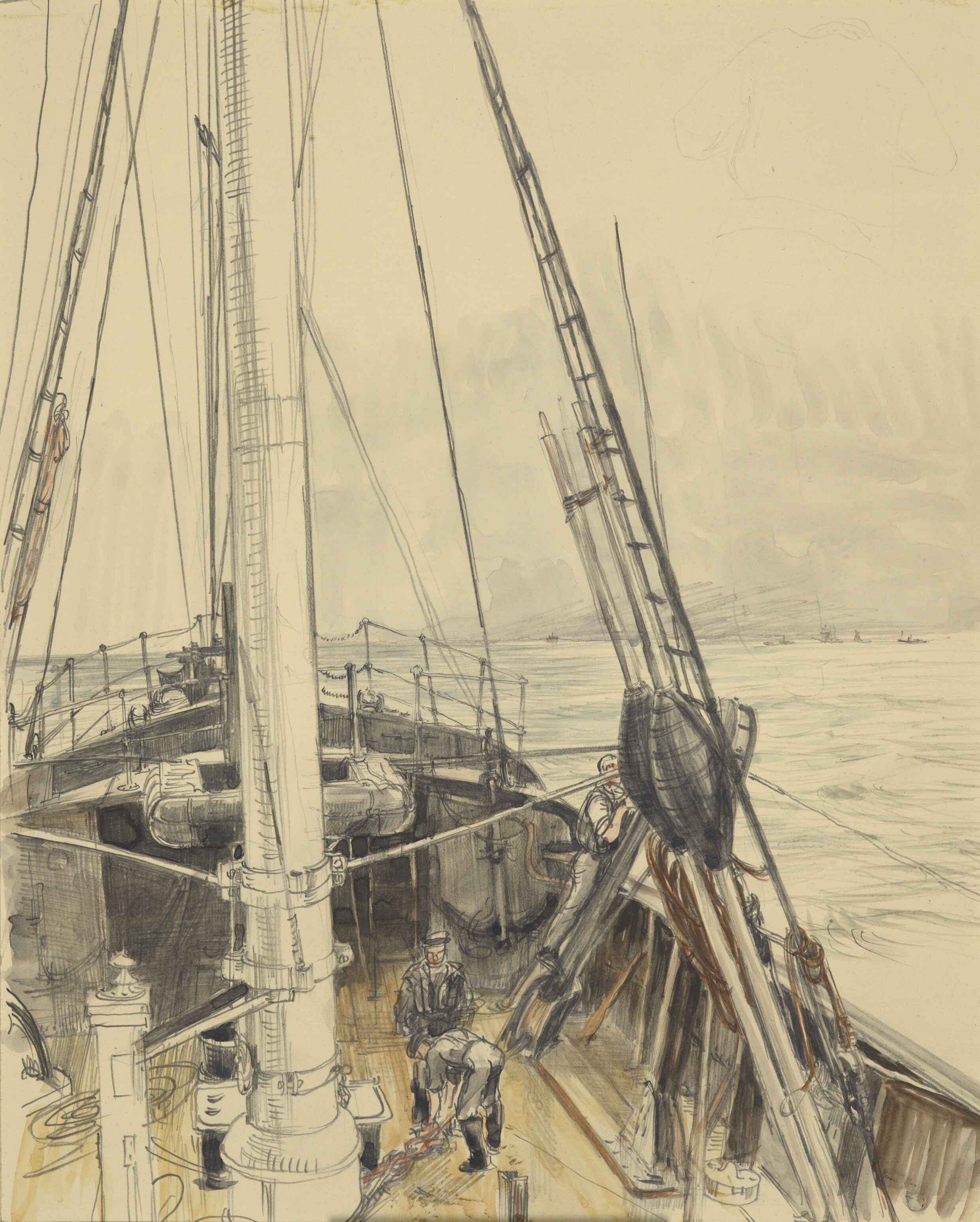
Slipping the "kite" which controls the mine sweeping depth

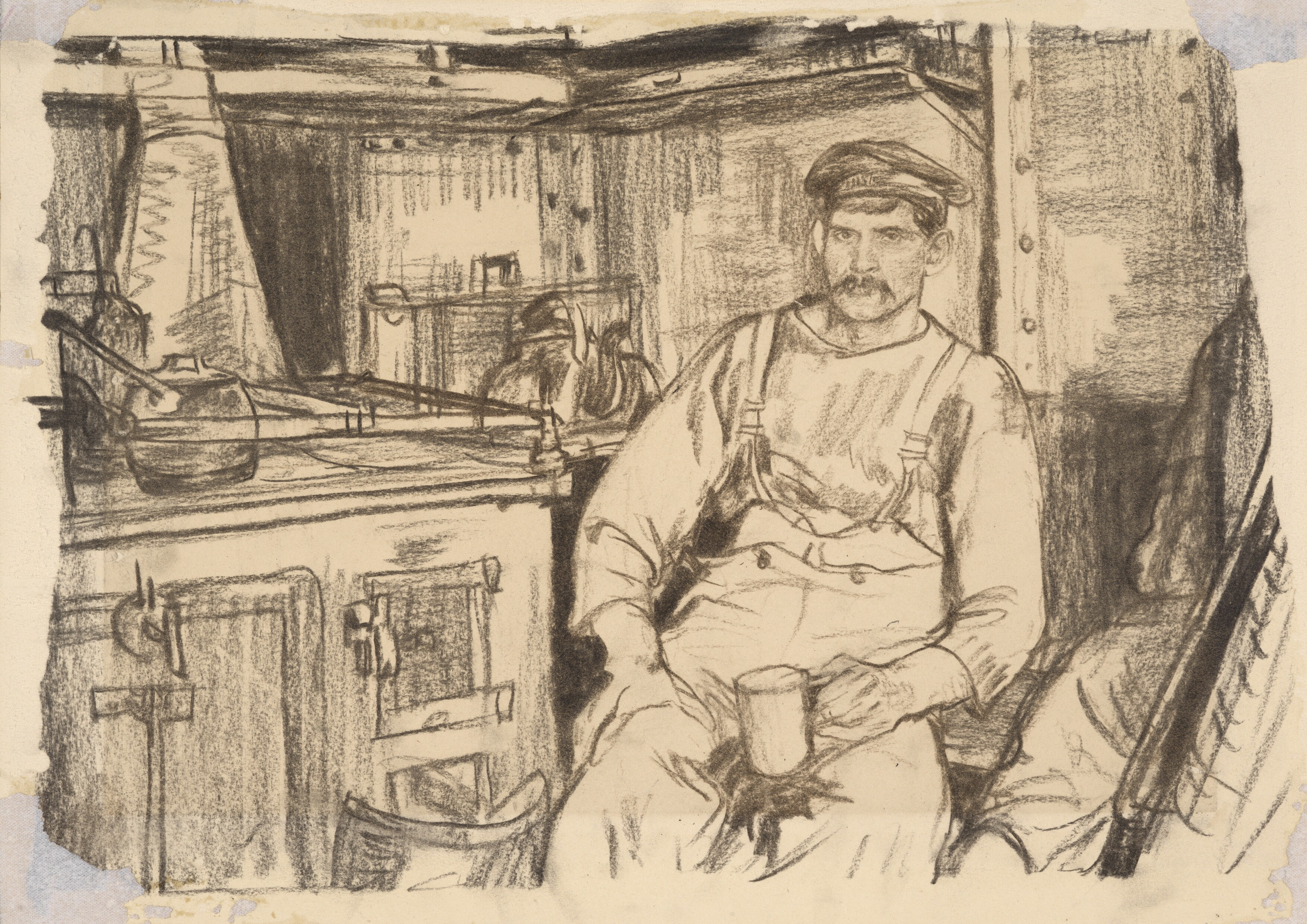
Cook in the galley

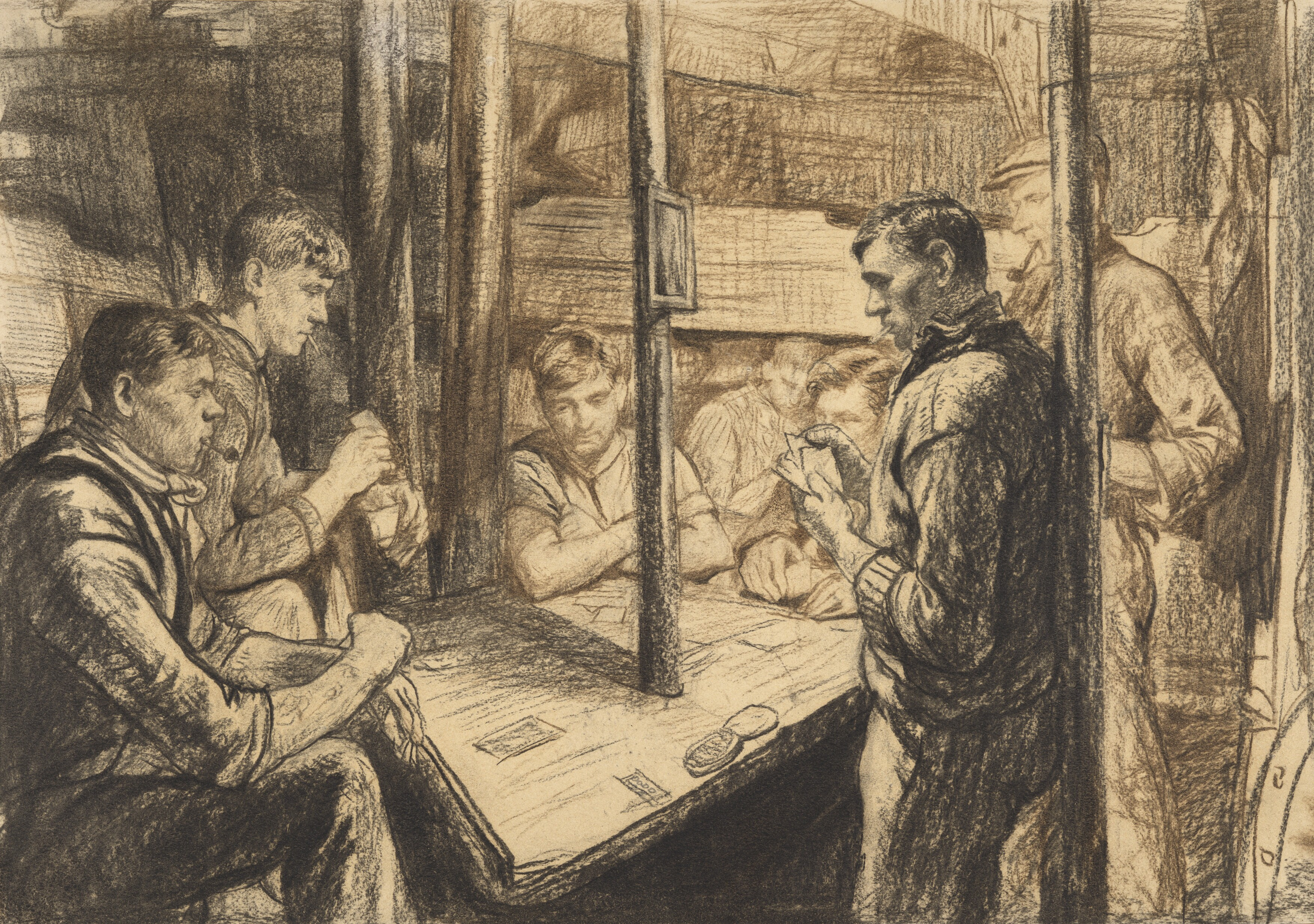
Cards in the fo'c's'le

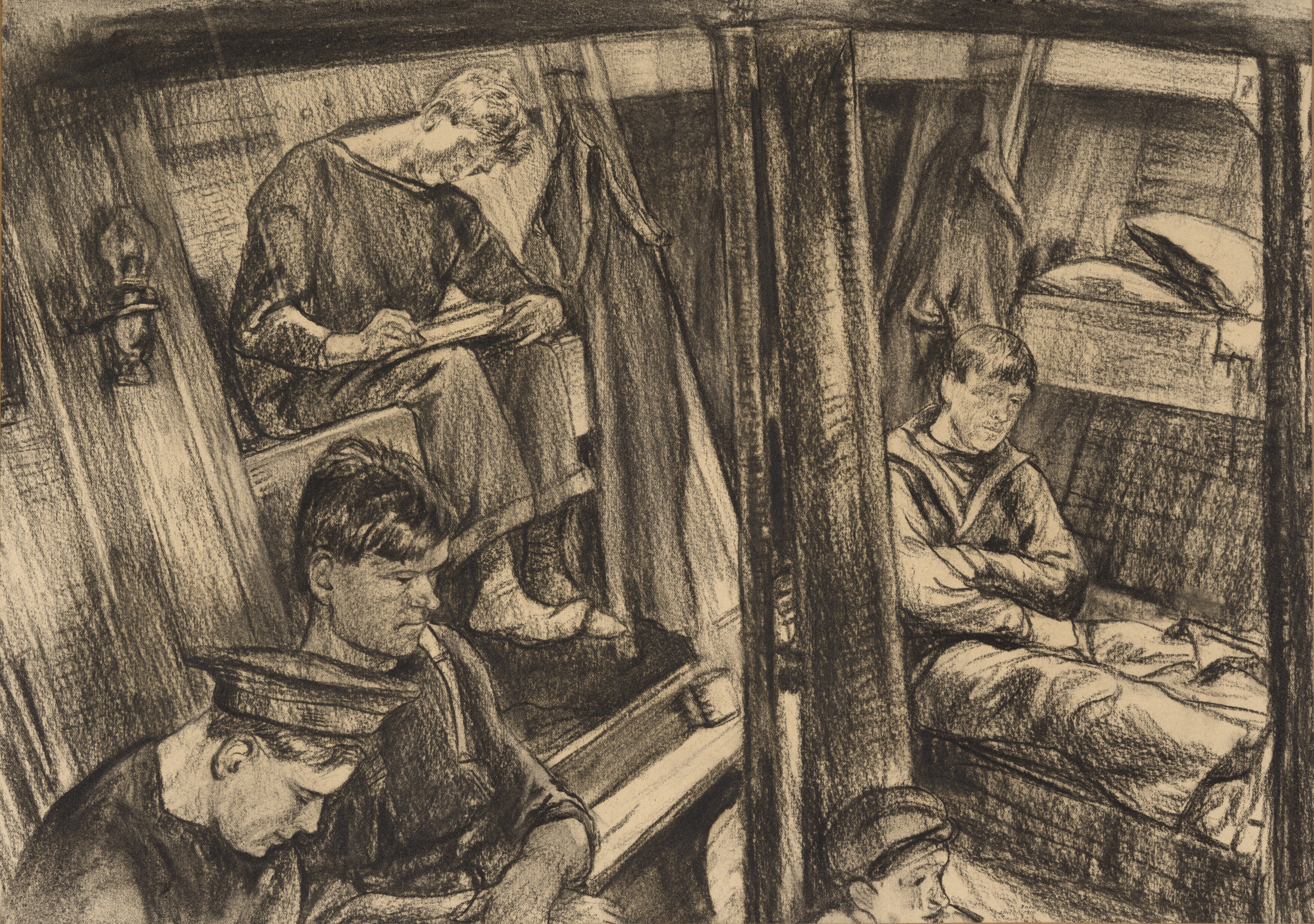
Mail day

== See also ==
- HMT Agate - an armed trawler
- Tuman – Soviet naval trawler sunk in the Kildin Island engagement [August 4, 1941]
- Naval drifter
- Royal Naval Patrol Service

== Reading ==
- Chesneau, Roger (1980). Conway's All the World's Fighting Ships 1922-1946. ISBN 0-85177-146-7.
- Lund, Paul; Ludlam, Harry (1971). Trawlers go to War. W. Foulsham. ISBN 978-0-572-00768-3.
- Lund, Paul; Ludlam, Harry (1972). Trawlers go to War (paperback). New English Library. ISBN 0-450-01175-5.
- Lund, Paul; Ludlam, Harry (1978). Out Sweeps! - The Story of the Minesweepers in World War II. New English Library. ISBN 978-0-450-04468-7.
- McKee, Alexander (1973). The Coal-Scuttle Brigade : The splendid, dramatic story of the Channel convoys. New English Library. ISBN 978-0450013546.
