= List of ships of the Royal New Zealand Navy =

Sortable list of commissioned vessels of the Royal New Zealand Navy from its formation on 1 October 1941 to the present. It does not include vessels of the New Zealand Division of the Royal Navy (1921–1941) or New Zealand Naval Forces (1913–1921) or earlier vessels up to 1913.

Name	Image	Pennant	Class	Type	Com	Decom	Fate/notes
HMNZS Achilles		C70	Leander class	Cruiser	1941	1946	Sold to the Indian Navy and renamed INS Delhi. Scrapped in 1978
HMNZS Aotearoa		A11		Replenishment oiler	2020	current	
HMNZS Arabis		K385	Flower class	Corvette	1944	1948	Scrapped in 1951
HMNZS Arbutus		K403	Flower class	Corvette	1944	1948	Scrapped in 1951
HMNZS Aroha		T24	Castle class	Minesweeper	1943	1945	Scrapped in 1963
HMNZS Awatere		T25	Castle class	Minesweeper	1943	1943	Last seen fishing around Taiwan October 1949
HMNZS Bellona		C63	Dido class	Light cruiser	1946	1956	Scrapped in 1959
HMNZS Blackpool		F77	Whitby class	Frigate	1966	1971	Leased by RN to New Zealand 1966 – 1971. Returned to RN. Sold for breaking up in 1978
HMNZS Black Prince		C81	Dido class	Light cruiser	1946	1961	Crew were among first to take part in 1947 Royal New Zealand Navy mutinies. Leased from, and returned to, Royal Navy. Scrapped 1962
HMNZS Breeze		T02	Converted merchant boat	Minesweeper	1942	1944	Last seen when sold to Philippines in 1964 and renamed Balabac in 1966
HMNZS Canterbury		F421	Leander class	Frigate	1971	2005	Broad beam Leander. Scuttled as a dive wreck November 2007
HMNZS Canterbury		L421		Multi-role vessel	2007	current	
HMNZS Charles Upham		A02		Logistics support	1995	1998	Commercial Ro-Ro vessel purchased for conversion to logistics supply. Project abandoned and sold to Contenemar and renamed Don Carlos. Later sold onwards and last known as Nusantara Sejati. Actively sailing in 2024.
HMNZS Coastguard		T12	Converted trawler	Danlayer	1941	1960	Functioned as a stores ship between 1945–1960. Rebuilt (2020) to become the office for Heartland Timbers (a small private company in New Zealand). Name changed to Kaikohe post RNZN ownership.
HMNZS Cook II				Naval base	1943	1944	Naval base (not a ship) located at Solomon Islands. See HMNZS Kahu
HMNZS Duchess		T07	Converted merchant boat	Minesweeper; Examination; Liberty launch	1941; 1942; 1945	1941; 1944; 1946	Ran aground and abandoned at Wreck Bay, Rangitoto Island in June 1947.
HMNZS Echuca		M252	Bathurst class	Corvette	1952	1967	Scrapped 1967
HMNZS Endeavour			Ailanthus-class net laying ship	Antarctic support	1956	1962	Former WWII US net laying ship converted to Antarctic duty. Purchased from British Antarctic Survey. Sold on and ultimately foundered off Newfoundland in 1982
HMNZS Endeavour		A184	Patapsco-class tanker	Antarctic support	1962	1971	Loaned from US as military aid. Returned to US and supplied to Republic of China (ROC) Navy. Decommissioned from ROC Navy in 2005. Her final disposition is unknown.
HMNZS Endeavour		A11		Fleet tanker	1988	2017	Scrapped 2018
HMNZS Futurist		T09	Converted trawler	Minesweeper	1941	1944	Functioned as a boom gate vessel 1944. Sunk 19 March 1947.
HMNZS Gale		T04	Converted merchant boat	Minesweeper	1941	1944	Returned to civilian ownership. Scrapped 1970
HMNZS Gambia		C48	Crown Colony class	Cruiser	1943	1946	Returned to RN. Scrapped 1968
HMNZS Hautapu		T26	Castle class	Minesweeper	1943	1947	Served in Lytteton. Sunk 1966
HMNZS Hawea		F422	Loch class	Frigate	1948	1965	Scrapped 1965
HMNZS Hawea		P3567	Lake class	Inshore patrol	1975	1991	Sold into Australia in 1991 and last seen as a civilian work boat in Queensland.
HMNZS Hawea		P3567	Lake class	Inshore patrol	2008	current	
HMNZS Hawera		T16	Converted merchant boat	Minesweeper	1941	1945	Functioned as supply ship in 1945. Sank 1952, refloated and beached. Was removed from beach 1956-1957
HMNZS Hickleton		M1131	Ton class	Minesweeper	1965	1966	Sold to Argentina. Argentina decommissioned her in 1996 and sold her on.
HMNZS Hinau		T17	Castle class	Minesweeper	1942	1945	Broken up 1954, hulk ran aground 1958 as a breakwater
HMNZS Hinau		P3556	Moa class	Inshore patrol	1985	2007	Sold to private ownership and as of 2025, the ship is sailing in active use and is known as Seapatroller (Sea Patroller etc.).
HMNZS Humphrey		T06	Converted trawler	Minesweeper	1941	1944	Scrapped 1970
HMNZS Inchkeith		T155	Isles class	Minesweeper	1941	1946	Scrapped 1959
HMNZS Inverell		M233	Bathurst class	Corvette	1952	1976	Training and fisheries patrols. Sold for scrap in 1977
HMNZS Isa Lei		YF-1038	Covered Lighter (Self-propelled)	Ammunition Carrier	1952	1961	Originally commissioned in 1944 into the United States Navy. Scrapped at Te Atatu, 1967
HMNZS Irirangi				Naval base	1943	1993	Naval radio station at Waiouru (not a ship but a land-based installation)
HMNZS James Cosgrove		T10	Castle class	Minesweeper	1941	1944	Sunk at sea 1952
HMNZS Kahu		A04	Moa class	Inshore patrol	1988	2009	Known as Diving tender HMNZS Manawanui (A09) 1979-1988. Renamed HMNZS Kahu in 1988. Kahu used as training vessel and backup diving tender. Sold for use as a pleasure craft in February 2010. As of 2021 actively sailing.
HMNZS Kaiwaka		T14	Converted merchant boat	Danlayer	1941	1945	Scuttled early 2000s
HMNZS Kaniere		F426	Loch class	Frigate	1948	1967	Scrapped 1967
HMNZS Kapuni		T15	Converted merchant boat	Minesweeper	1941	1945	Functioned as supply ship 1945. Broken up 1971
HMNZS Kiama		M353	Bathurst class	Corvette	1952	1979	Broken up in 1979
HMNZS Killegray		T174	Isles class	Minesweeper	1941	1946	Broken up 1959
HMNZS Kiwi		T102	Bird class	Minesweeper	1941; 1948; 1951	1946; 1949; 1956	AS MS; Training ship Training ship Scrapped in 1964
HMNZS Kiwi		P3554	Moa class	Inshore patrol	1983	2007	Renamed MV Sarasu, privately owned and based in Melbourne Australia. Was actively sailing in 2017.
HMNZS Lachlan		K364		Survey ship	1949	1974	Converted WWII River-class frigate. Scrapped in 1993
HMNZS Leander	HMNZS Leander	C75	Leander class	Cruiser	1941	1948	Served in the New Zealand Division 1937–1941. Returned to RN in 1945. Scrapped in 1950
HMNZS Maimai		T27	Castle class	Minesweeper	1943	1946	Scrapped in 1966
HMNZS Manawanui				Dockyard tug Diving tender	1948; 1953	1952; 1978	Sold in 1978 to the Paeroa Historic Maritime Park. Scrapped at an unknown date
HMNZS Manawanui		A09		Diving tender	1979	1988	Renamed HMNZS Kahu 1988 and continued RNZN service
HMNZS Manawanui		A09		Diving tender	1988	2018	Sold to civilian organization and renamed RV Ocean Recovery
HMNZS Manawanui		A09		Diving support, hydrographic and deep sea salvage vessel	2019	2024	Sunk on 6 October 2024 after running aground in Samoa
HMNZS Manuka		T19	Castle class	Minesweeper	1942	1945	Sunk in 1952.
HMNZS Matai		T01	Converted merchant boat	Minesweeper	1941	1946	Functioned as transport ship 1945–1946. Broken up 1965
HMNZS Moa		T233	Bird class	Minesweeper	1941	1943	Sunk 7 April 1943
HMNZS Moa		P3553	Moa Class	Inshore patrol	1984	2007	Sold to private civilian ownership. Renamed Flightless and based in the Marlborough Sounds
HMNZS Monowai		F59		Armed merchant cruiser	1941	1943	In 1960 she was sold for breaking up
HMNZS Monowai		A06		Hydrographic survey	1977	1997	Former Pacific Island ferry Moana Roa. Scrapped in 2002
HMNZS Muritai		T05	Converted merchant boat	Minesweeper	1941	1946	Functioned as training and cable-lifting ship 1945–1946. Scuttled 1963. Refloated and broken up in 1971
HMNZS Nora Niven		T23	Converted trawler	Danlayer	1941	1944	Scuttled 1947
HMNZS Otago		F111	Rothesay class	Frigate	1960	1983	Scrapped 1987
HMNZS Otago		P148	Protector class	Offshore patrol	2008	current	
HMNZS Pahau		T28	Castle class	Minesweeper	1944	1945	Served in Wellington. Last seen fishing in Taiwan in October 1949
HMNZS Philomel				Naval base	1941	current	As of 2025, main RNZN Logistics and Training Base Devonport (not a ship but a land installation). Originally a ship, HMS Philomel in the New Zealand Division, 1921–1941. Then in 1941 the ship was transferred to RNZN as HMNZS Philomel. The ship was sunk 1949
HMNZS Phyllis		T22	Converted trawler	Danlayer	1943	1944	Ran aground 1954
HMNZS Pukaki	HMNZS Pukaki (F424)	F424	Loch class	Frigate	1948	1966	Scrapped 1966
HMNZS Pukaki		P3568	Lake class	Inshore patrol	1975	1991	Sold to private ownership. Status unknown since 1991
HMNZS Pukaki		P3568	Lake class	Inshore patrol	2009	2019	Sold to the Irish Naval Service in 2023
HMNZS Puriri		T02	Converted merchant boat	Minesweeper	1941	1941	Sunk 14 May 1941. Puriri was sunk just before the creation of the RNZN (thus technically should not be on this list).
Q 400		Q 400	Fairmile B class	Motor launch	1943	1945	Suffered engine room fire and explosion. Final fate unknown
Q 401		Q 401	Fairmile B class	Motor launch	1943	1945	Fate unknown
Q 402		Q 402	Fairmile B class	Motor launch	1943	1945	Renamed MV Ngaroma and used as a Waiheke ferry until 1992, when she went to Sri Lanka.
Q 403		Q 403	Fairmile B class	Motor launch	1943	1945	As of 2011 lies on Paritata Peninsula in Whaingaroa Harbour.
Q 404		Q 404	Fairmile B class	Motor launch	1943	1945	Fate unknown
Q 405		Q 405	Fairmile B class	Motor launch	1943	1945	
Q 406		Q 406	Fairmile B class	Motor launch	1943	1945	
Q 407		Q 407	Fairmile B class	Motor launch	1943	1945	
Q 408		Q 408	Fairmile B class	Motor launch	1943	1945	
Q 409		Q 409	Fairmile B class	Motor launch	1943; 1953	1945; 1963	Recommissioned from 1953 to 1963 as HMNZS Maori. In 1963 became the Auckland ferry Iris Moana.
Q 410		Q 410	Fairmile B class	Motor launch	1943	1945	
Q 411		Q 411	Fairmile B class	Motor launch	1943; 1947	1945; 1965	Recommissioned from 1947 to 1965 as HMNZS Kahu. The photo shows her post war on the Waitemata Harbour. Scrapped in 2023
Q1183		Q1183	HDML class	Motor launch	1943	1945	1950 renamed Mako (P3551)
Q1184		Q1184	HDML class	Motor launch	1943	1945	1950 renamed Paea (P3552)
Q1185		Q1185	HDML class	Motor launch	1943	1945	1950 renamed Manga (P3567)
Q1186		Q1186	HDML class	Motor launch	1943	1945	
Q1187		Q1187	HDML class	Motor launch	1943	1945	1950 renamed Tarapunga I (P3566)
Q1188		Q1188	HDML class	Motor launch	1943	1945	1950 renamed Takapu I (P3556)
Q1189		Q1189	HDML class	Motor launch	1943	1945	
Q1190		Q1190	HDML class	Motor launch	1943	1967	1950 renamed Parore (P3562)
Q1191		Q1191	HDML class	Motor launch	1943	1966	1950 renamed Kahawai I (P3553)
Q1192		Q1192	HDML class	Motor launch	1943	1967	1950 renamed Maroro (P3554)
Q1193		Q1193	HDML class	Motor launch	1943	1945	1950 renamed Tamure (P3555)
Q1194		Q1194	HDML class	Motor launch	1943	1967	1950 renamed Ngapona I (P3561)
Q1348		Q1348	HDML class	Motor launch	1943	1967	1950 renamed Kuparu (P3563)
Q1349		Q1349	HDML class	Motor launch	1944	1964	1950 renamed Haku (P3565)
Q1350		Q1350	HDML class	Motor launch	1944	1967	1950 renamed Koura (P3564)
Q1351		Q1351	HDML class	Motor launch	1944	1945	
HMNZS Rata		T03	Converted merchant boat	Minesweeper	1941	1943	Broken up 1959
HMNZS Resolution		A14		Survey and research	1997	2012	Decommissioned and sold to EGS Group. Renamed RV Geo Resolution. Actively sailing as of 2025.
HMNZS Rimu		T18	Castle class	Minesweeper	1942	1945	Sunk as target in 1958
HMNZS Rotoiti		F425	Loch class	Frigate	1948	1967	Towed to Hong Kong for scrapping 1967
HMNZS Rotoiti		P3569	Lake class	Inshore patrol	1975	1991	Fate unknown
HMNZS Rotoiti		P3569	Lake class	Inshore patrol	2009	2019	Sold to the Irish Naval Service in 2023
HMNZS Royalist		C89	Dido class	Cruiser	1956	1966	Towed from Auckland to Osaka for scrapping 1967
HMNZS Sanda		T160	Isles class	Minesweeper	1941	1946	Scrapped 1970
HMNZS Santon		M1178	Ton class	Minesweeper	1965	1966	Sold to Argentina, renamed ARA Chubut, decommissioned by Argentina 1997
HMNZS Scarba		T175	Isles class	Minesweeper	1941	1946	Broken up 1959
HMNZS South Sea		T22	Converted trawler	Minesweeper	1941	1942	Sunk 19 December 1942
HMNZS Southland		F104	Leander class	Frigate	1983	1995	In November 1995 Southland was towed away for scrapping.
HMNZS Stawell		M348	Bathurst class	Corvette	1952	1959	Sold for scrap in 1968
HMNZS Tamaki				Naval base	1941	2000	Training base (not a ship but a land installation), actually 2 different training bases at different periods of time, now part of HMNZS Philomel
HMNZS Takapu			Moa class	Inshore survey	1980	2000	Sold into private ownership. Renamed Takapu 2. She was berthed in the Viaduct marina for the 25 years until 2025.
HMNZS Taranaki		F148	Rothesay class	Frigate	1961	1982	Scrapped in 1988
HMNZS Tarapunga			Moa class	Inshore survey	1980	2000	Sold for private use. Fate unknown.
HMNZS Tasman				Naval base	1944	1955	Naval base (not a ship but a land installation). Actually 2 different bases at different periods of time, Lyttelton 1944-1956 and Devonport 1975-?.
HMNZS Taupo		F423	Loch class	Frigate	1948	1962	She was scrapped in 1962.
HMNZS Taupo		P3570	Lake class	Inshore patrol	1975	1990	Sold off. Final fate unknown.
HMNZS Taupo		P3570	Lake class	Inshore patrol	2009	current	
HMNZS Te Kaha		F77	Anzac class	Frigate	1997	current	
HMNZS Te Mana		F111	Anzac class	Frigate	1999	current	
HMNZS Thomas Currell		T11	Converted trawler	Minesweeper	1941	1944	Beached (ran ashore at Port Hutt 1968) and deteriorating on the coast of Chatham Island
HMNZS Tui		T234	Bird class	Minesweeper	1941; 1952; 1956	1946; 1955; 1967	AS MS. Training ship. Research ship. Sold for scrapping in 1969 and scrapped. Replaced by HMNZS Tui in 1970.
HMNZS Tui		A2/A05	Robert D. Conrad class	Oceanographic research	1970	1997	Scuttled as a dive wreck in 1999
HMNZS Tutira		F420	Loch class	Frigate	1948	1951	Broken up in 1966.
HMNZS Viti		T373	Converted merchant boat	Minesweeper	1941	1945	Final fate unknown.
HMNZS Waiho		T34	Castle class	Minesweeper	1944	1946	Sold to Red Funnel Trawlers and renamed to "Matong". Sold for scrap in 1963.
HMNZS Waikato		F55	Leander class	Frigate	1966	1998	Sunk in 2000
HMNZS Waima		T33	Castle class	Minesweeper	1944	1946	Sold to Red Funnel Trawlers and renamed to "Moona". In 1963 she was sold to be scrapped.
HMNZS Waipu		T32	Castle class	Minesweeper	1943	1946	Served in Auckland. Sold to Red Funnel Trawlers and renamed to "Mulloka". In 1963 she was sold to be scrapped.
HMNZS Wakefield				Naval base	1948	current	Administrative base for Wellington (not a ship but a land-based installation). Was named HMNZS Philomel II until 1954.
HMNZS Wakakura		P3555	Moa class	Inshore patrol	1985	2007	Sold to private ownership. Actively sailing as of July 2022.
HMNZS Wakakura		T00	Castle class	Minesweeper	1941	1945	Served in the New Zealand Division, 1926–1941. Put up for sale for scrapping in 1950 and scrapped 1953.
HMNZS Wellington		F69	Leander class	Frigate	1982	2000	Sunk in Wellington in 2005
HMNZS Wellington		P55	Protector class	Offshore patrol	2007	current	

== See also ==
- Current Royal New Zealand Navy ships
- List of Royal New Zealand Navy bases — New Zealand Navy bases have the official designation HMNZS, and are regarded as land-based "ships"

== Sources ==
- Walters, Sydney David (1956) The Royal New Zealand Navy, Official History, Department of Internal Affairs, Wellington Online
- McDougall, R J (1989) New Zealand Naval Vessels. Government Printing Office. ISBN 978-0-477-01399-4
- Royal New Zealand Navy Official web site
