= Training ships of the Royal New Zealand Navy =

Commissioned training boats of the Royal New Zealand Navy from its formation on 1 October 1941 to the present:

Name	Type	Class	Dates	Notes
HMNZS Inverell	Corvette	Bathurst class	1952–1976	Training and fisheries patrols
HMNZS Kahu	Inshore patrol	Moa class	1978–2010	Training vessel, backup diving tender
HMNZS Kiwi	Minesweeper	Bird class	1948–1949; 1951–1956	Training ship Training ship
HMNZS Muritai	Minesweeper	Converted merchant boat	1945-1946	Training and cable-lifting ship
HMNZS Philomel	Naval base		1941–current	Devonport. Main RNZN Logistics and Training Base.
HMNZS Tui	Minesweeper	Bird class	1952–1955	Training ship

== See also ==
- Current Royal New Zealand Navy ships
- List of ships of the Royal New Zealand Navy
