= Corvettes of the Royal New Zealand Navy =

This is a list of commissioned corvettes of the Royal New Zealand Navy from its formation on 1 October 1941 to the present.

== Flower-class corvettes ==
Class	Dates	Career	Fate
HMNZS Arabis (K385)	1944–1948		scrapped 1951
HMNZS Arbutus (K403)	1944–1948		scrapped 1951

== Bathurst-class corvettes ==
Class	Dates	Career	Fate
HMNZS Echuca	1952–1967		Sold for scrap in 1967
HMNZS Inverell	1952–1976	Training and fisheries patrols	Sold for scrap in 1977
HMNZS Kiama	1952–1979		Paid off for disposal 1976
HMNZS Stawell	1952–1968		Sold for scrap in 1968

== See also ==
- Current Royal New Zealand Navy ships
- List of ships of the Royal New Zealand Navy
