= HMS Sparrow (1889) =

Royal Navy ship

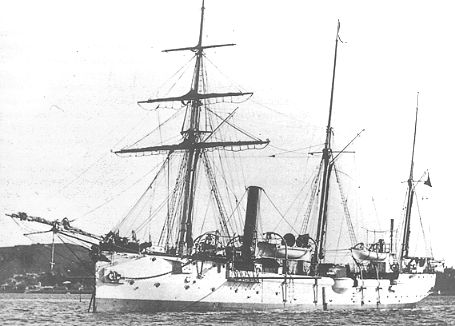
- HMS Sparrow

History

Royal NavyUnited Kingdom
- Name: HMS Sparrow
- Builder: Scotts Shipbuilding and Engineering Company, Greenock
- Cost: £39,000
- Yard number: 261
- Laid down: 1888
- Launched: 26 September 1889
- Commissioned: 13 May 1890
- Decommissioned: 1904

New Zealand GovernmentNew Zealand
- Name: NZS Amokura
- In service: October 1906
- Out of service: December 1921
- Fate: Sold as a coal hulk in February 1922

General characteristics
- Class & type: Redbreast-class gunboat
- Displacement: 805 tons
- Length: 165 ft 0 in (50.3 m) pp
- Beam: 31 ft 0 in (9.4 m)
- Draught: 11 ft 0 in (3.35 m) min, 13 ft 9 in (4.19 m) max
- Installed power: 1,200 ihp (890 kW)
- Propulsion: Triple expansion steam engine; 2 × boilers; Single screw
- Sail plan: Barquentine-rigged
- Speed: 13 kn (24 km/h)
- Range: 2,500 nmi (4,600 km) at 10 kn (19 km/h)
- Complement: 76
- Armament: As HMS Sparrow: 6 × BL 4-inch (101.6 mm) 25-pounder guns; 4 × machine guns; As NZS Amokura: None

HMS Sparrow was a Redbreast-class gunboat launched in 1889, the sixth Royal Navy ship to bear the name. She became the New Zealand training ship NZS Amokura in 1906 and was sold in 1922.

== Design ==
The Redbreast class were designed by Sir William Henry White, the Royal Navy Director of Naval Construction in 1888.

== Construction ==
Sparrow was launched on 26 September 1889 at Scotts Shipbuilding and Engineering Company, Greenock. Her triple-expansion reciprocating steam engine was built by the Greenock Foundry, and developed 1,200 indicated horsepower, sufficient to propel her at 13 kn (24 km/h) through her single screw. Her hull was of composite construction, that is, iron keel, frames, stem and stern posts with wooden planking. She was rigged as a barquentine.

== Royal Navy career ==
Sparrow was sent to the East Indies Station, where she served in the Persian Gulf and then in South and East Africa, participating in the suppression of the slave trade in the Congo area. In 1891 she took part in land engagements against local inhabitants in support of the Anglo-French Boundary Commission. A landing party from Sparrow captured and destroyed the strongholds of Tambi and Toniatuba in 1892, in reprisal for attacks on tribes under British protection.

Between 7 and 13 August 1893 she was engaged in the expedition against Fumo Amari (the Sultan of Wituland) in modern-day Kenya. The expedition resulted in the capture of Pumwani and Jongeni. The Ashantee Medal was awarded to those who were employed on her during this expedition, together with the clasp "Witu 1893".

On 27 August 1896 she played a part in the Anglo–Zanzibar War, whose duration of 40 minutes makes it the shortest war in history. Her first commission ended when she paid off at Sheerness on 19 January 1900, and was placed in the Dockyard Reserve.

She recommissioned for service on the Australia Station, and in May 1900 was based at Sydney, where regular visits to New Zealand formed part of her duties. Lieutenant Alexander Attwood Gordon was appointed in command in November 1900, and took her to Port Said in early January 1901, before he was succeeded in June 1901 by Lieutenant Vivian Henry Gerald Bernard.

Between 11 and 27 June 1901 she escorted the royal yacht Ophir around the New Zealand coast when the Duke and Duchess of Cornwall and York (later King George V and Queen Mary) visited the colony. She was laid up at Garden Island Naval Dockyard in 1904, and on 28 February 1905, she was taken over by the New Zealand Government.

== Transfer to the New Zealand Marine Department ==
Sparrow arrived at Wellington, New Zealand on 21 March 1905. She remained at anchor for a year while Parliament approved her use as a training ship. She was bought from the Royal Navy for £800 on 10 July 1906 and transferred to the New Zealand Marine Department. Having been stripped of her weapons, she was commissioned at Wellington as a government-funded training ship, NZS Amokura, in October 1906. (Amokura is the Maori name for the red-tailed tropicbird.)

Her first intake of sixty cadets arrived on 19 March 1907, aged between 12 and 14. About a third of her time was spent on training voyages, travelling as far south as the sub-Antarctic and as far north as the Kermadec Islands. She remained at Port Nicholson, Wellington for the remainder of the year.

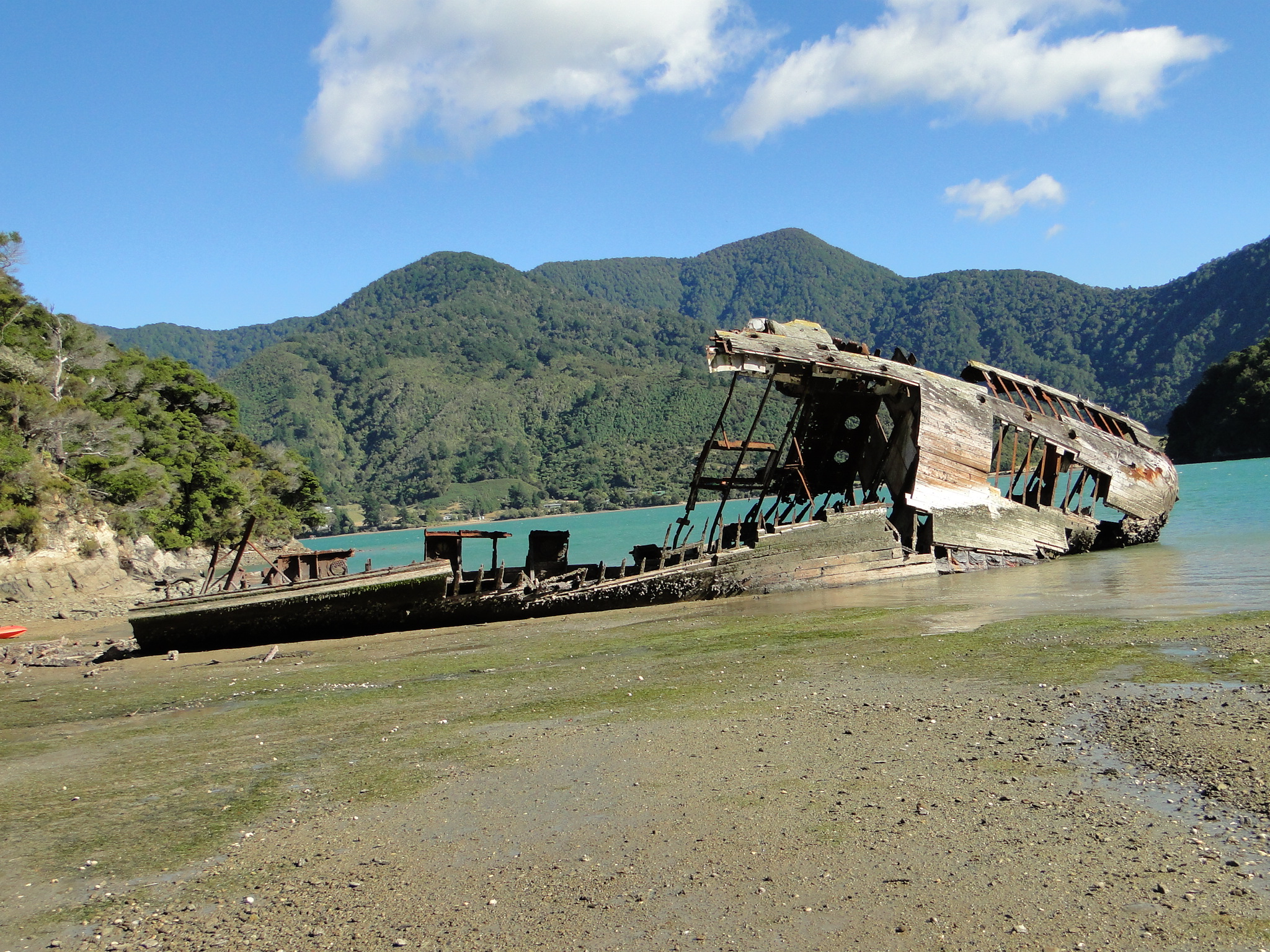
NZS Amokura, March 2010, Marlborough Sounds, New Zealand

== Fate ==
By 1919 she was in a poor state of repair, and the prohibitive cost of returning her to a seaworthy condition brought an end to her seagoing life. The last cadet was discharged on 16 December 1921, and she was formally paid off in late December. She was sold to Mr E A Jory in February 1922 and dismantled at Wellington before being sold to the Westport Coal Company for use as a coal hulk. In 1940 she was sold again to the Union Steam Ship Company of New Zealand for further use as a coal hulk at Port Nicholson, and in March 1953 was sold for the last time and towed to St Omer Bay in the Kenepuru Sound, where she was used as a store hulk and jetty. Although reported broken up in 1955, her remains lie on the beach in the southern end of the bay (41°11.12′S 173°58.33′E).
