= A184 =

A184 may refer to:

- A184 road (England), a road connecting Sunderland and Gateshead
- HMNZS Endeavour (A-184), 1962 New Zealand Navy Patapsco-class gasoline tanker
- A-184 torpedo, an Italian torpedo
