= List of Royal New Zealand Navy bases =

This is a list of commissioned naval bases of the Royal New Zealand Navy from its formation on 1 October 1941 to the present. The Royal New Zealand Navy follows the British tradition of commissioning land naval bases as though they were ships. The administrative structures that work for a ship work just as well for a land establishment. The commander of a ship can become the commander of a land establishment, and be entirely comfortable with the way the place is run. This simplifies the overall administration of the navy. For this reason, naval bases are sometimes referred to as stone frigates.

In earlier times or in wartime, naval bases actually were ships. HMS Philomel was an old cruiser which functioned as New Zealand's first naval base. HMNZS Kahu was a Fairmile B motor launch, and it functioned as an administrative base for the Fairmile flotillas during World War II.

It is also in this tradition for land establishments to be associated with one or more "name ships". However this association is largely ceremonial.

== List of bases ==
Name	Name ships	Dates	Location	Notes
HMNZS Cook	Harptree; HDML 1183	1943–44; 1944–46	Clyde Quay, Wellington; Shelly Bay, Wellington	
HMNZS Cook II	HMNZS Kahu	1943–44	Solomon Islands	Administrative base for Fairmile flotillas
HMNZS Irirangi	SDML P3554	1951–93	Waiouru	Formerly Waiouru W/T Station. Radio intercept station
HMNZS Ngapona		1950–current	Auckland	Naval Reserve training base Has a satellite unit at Tauranga
HMNZS Olphert		1928–current	Wellington	Naval Reserve training base
HMNZS Pegasus		1928–current	Christchurch	Naval Reserve training base
HMNZS Philomel	HMNZS Philomel	1923–41; 1941–47; 1947–current	Devonport	Was HMS Philomel Main RNZN Logistics and Training Base
HMNZS Philomel II		1948–53	Wellington	Renamed Wakefield
HMNZS Tamaki		1941–63; 1963–2000	Motuihi Island; Fort Cautley, Narrow Neck	Training base Training base Now part of HMNZS Philomel
HMNZS Tasman		1944–56; 1975–?	Lyttelton; Devonport	
HMNZS Toroa		?–current	Dunedin	Naval Reserve training base
HMNZS Wakefield		1954–current	Wellington	Command and administration staff for naval personnel resident outside the Greater Auckland area. Formerly Philomel II
HMNZS Waiouru		1943–51	Waiouru	W/T (Wireless Telegraph) Station. Renamed Irirangi

HMNZ Dockyard is managed by Babcock New Zealand Ltd on behalf of the Chief of Naval Staff through a commercial management agreement. This is not a commissioned ship; it is instead analogous to HMNB Devonport or HMNB Portsmouth.

== See also ==
- Current Royal New Zealand Navy ships
- List of ships of the Royal New Zealand Navy
