= Cruisers of the Royal New Zealand Navy =

Commissioned cruisers of the Royal New Zealand Navy from its formation on 1 October 1941 to the present:

Name	Type	Class	Dates	Notes
HMNZS Achilles (70)	Cruiser	Leander class	1941–1946	in the New Zealand Division 1936–1941
HMNZS Leander	Cruiser	Leander class	1941–1948	in the New Zealand Division 1937–1941
HMNZS Monowai (F59)	Armed merchant cruiser	n/a	1940–1943	Liner fitted with guns. Surplus in 1943 and converted to landing ship
HMNZS Gambia (C48)	Cruiser	Crown Colony class	1943–1946	Passed to RNZN as Leander and Achilles were out of action after being damaged in Pacific.
HMNZS Bellona (63)	Cruiser	Dido classBellona subgroup	1946–1956	
HMNZS Black Prince (81)	Cruiser	Dido classBellona subgroup	1946–1961	Second World War light cruiser loaned from Royal Navy. In reserve 1947–1953. In reserve from 1953. Used as accommodation and source of parts for 'Royalist
HMNZS Royalist (C89)	Cruiser	Dido classBellona subgroup	1956–1966	Second World War light cruiser purchased from Royal Navy after reconstruction

== Loss of HMS Neptune ==
HMS Neptune was a Leander-class light cruiser which served with the Royal Navy during World War II. Early in 1941 the New Zealand Government responded to an Admiralty request for sailors to man an additional cruiser. Neptune was selected and was expected to leave the United Kingdom for New Zealand in May. However, because of the loss of cruisers during the Crete campaign Neptune was instead attached to Admiral Cunningham's Force K, based on Malta. On 19 December 1941 she was sunk by mines. Only one crewman survived.

150 of those lost were New Zealanders, 80 of them had served in the Naval Reserve before the outbreak of war. The loss of Neptune was the greatest single tragedy New Zealand Naval Forces have experienced.

== See also ==
- Current Royal New Zealand Navy ships
- List of ships of the Royal New Zealand Navy
