= HMNZS Arbutus =

Modified Flower-class corvette

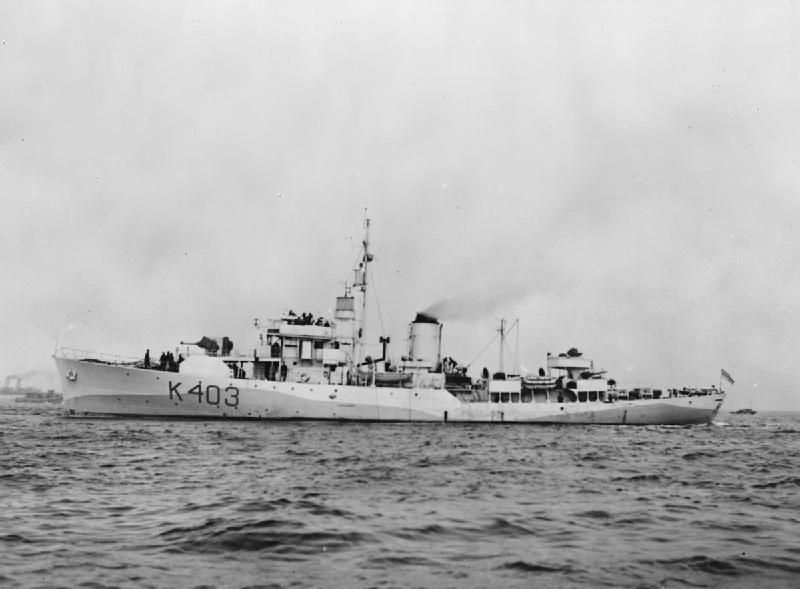
- HMNZS Arbutus in July 1944

History

New Zealand
- Name: Arbutus
- Builder: George Brown & Co of Greenock, Scotland
- Laid down: 3 May 1943
- Launched: 26 January 1944
- Completed: 5 July 1944
- Commissioned: 16 June 1944
- Decommissioned: 1948
- Identification: Pennant number: K403
- Fate: Broken up June 1951

General characteristics
- Class & type: Flower-class corvette
- Displacement: 980 tons standard; 1,350 tons full load
- Length: 63.5 m (208 ft) o/a
- Beam: 10.1 m (33 ft)
- Draught: 5.3 m (17 ft)
- Propulsion: 2 fire tube oilers, one 4-cycle triple-expansion steam engine 2,880 ihp (2,150 kW)
- Speed: 16 knots (30 km/h) at 2,750 hp (2,050 kW)
- Range: 3,500 nautical miles (6,500 km) at 12 knots (22 km/h)
- Complement: 85 (as built); 105 (as maintenance ship)
- Sensors & processing systems: ASDIC, radar (4×1-20mm)
- Armament: 1 × BL 4 in (102 mm) Mk IX gun; 8 × 20 mm Oerlikon anti-aircraft guns; ATW Hedgehog anti-submarine mortar; Depth charge projectors: 72 depth charges

HMNZS Arbutus (K403) was a modified Flower-class corvette of the Royal New Zealand Navy (RNZN). Built for the Royal Navy as HMS Arbutus, the corvette was transferred to the RNZN on completion in 1944, and operated in the British Pacific Fleet during the final year of World War II. In April 1947, Arbutus was one of the units involved in a mutiny over poor pay and working conditions. She was decommissioned in 1948 and broken up for scrap in 1951.

== Construction ==
The corvette was built for the Royal Navy by George Brown & Co of Greenock, Scotland. She was laid down on 3 May 1943, and launched on 26 January 1944. Before completion, she was transferred to the Royal New Zealand Navy, and commissioned on 16 June 1944, although not completed until 5 July.

== Operational history ==
=== World War II ===
Arbutus departed the United Kingdom for New Zealand on 1 August 1944, but ran aground off Viwa Island. She suffered damage to her rudder, propeller and a 25 foot length of her hull. HMNZS Aroha towed Arbutus to Auckland for repairs, which were not complete until April 1945. In May, Arbutus was offered for service in the British Pacific Fleet and sent to Sydney for fitting out as a radio and radar maintenance ship. She joined the fleet train in Japanese waters on 28 July and serviced at least forty ships of Task Force 37. Arbutus was then assigned to escorting supply ships and was present in Hong Kong for the Japanese Surrender.

=== Post-war ===
In early February, Arbutus was deployed on a two-month show the flag cruise around the Pacific Islands. The deployment had seen several incidents, the first of which occurred while the ship was docked in Tahiti; sailors who were meant to be guarding the ship became drunk, after which a crowd of Tahitians attempted to board the ship and remove equipment. On departure, the corvette sailed into a heavy storm, which lasted for several days. Waves breaking over the bow rendered the bridge unusable, and many aboard—including the ship's cat, for the first and only time in its life—were seasick. Water contamination of the fuel oil taken on in Tahiti damaged the propulsion machinery, further adding to the problems. When Arbutus finally limped into port at the end of March, the ship's company were informed that they would only remain at HMNZS Philomel long enough to take on aviation fuel and supplies to be delivered to the Cook Islands.

=== Mutiny ===
At the time of Arbutus' return to Philomel, there were problems affecting sailors across the RNZN. The main cause of unhappiness was a pay review due to be released in the next few days; the review was a year late, and sailors learned that they would still be underpaid in comparison to Army and Air Force equivalents, and that the government had backed down on its promise to backdate the pay to the original due date of the review. In addition, attempts to improve the working and living conditions aboard RNZN ships through lower-deck committees had proven to be ineffective.

On the morning of 1 April, 100 sailors at Philomel refused duty at morning parade; they were later joined by personnel from HMNZS Black Prince which was undergoing refits at the base. The ship's company of Arbutus had been confined to the ship in preparation for their imminent departure, but at 14:00, representatives of the mutineers walked up to the dock next to the corvette and began discussions with those aboard. All the sailors aboard Arbutus joined the mutiny, bringing the numbers up to 200. That afternoon, the mutineers marched off the base. Although the government agreed to make the new pay rates retrospective, the mutineers intended to remain off base until the rest of their demands were met. This did not happen; on 3 April, the sailors were ordered to return to work and accept punishment or be discharged. Of the 200, only 23 men returned to the base, they, along with 18 British loan personnel were used to man Arbutus and get her underway for the Cook Islands that afternoon. In their haste to separate the loyalists from further mutinous influences, the ship was not properly provisioned, and all aboard were forced to eat canned pilchards for the entire voyage.

== Fate ==
Arbutus was paid off in 1948, and returned to the Royal Navy. She was broken up for scrap in June 1951 at Dunston, Tyne and Wear.

== See also ==
- Corvettes of the Royal New Zealand Navy

== Citations ==
- Walters, Sydney David (1956) The Royal New Zealand Navy: Official History of New Zealand in the Second World War 1939-45, Department of Internal Affairs, Wellington Online
- Frame, Tom; Baker, Kevin (2000). Mutiny! Naval Insurrections in Australia and New Zealand. St. Leonards, NSW: Allen & Unwin. ISBN 1-86508-351-8. OCLC 46882022.
- McDougall, R J (1989) New Zealand Naval Vessels. pages 49–51. Government Printing Office. ISBN 978-0-477-01399-4
