= SS Muritai =

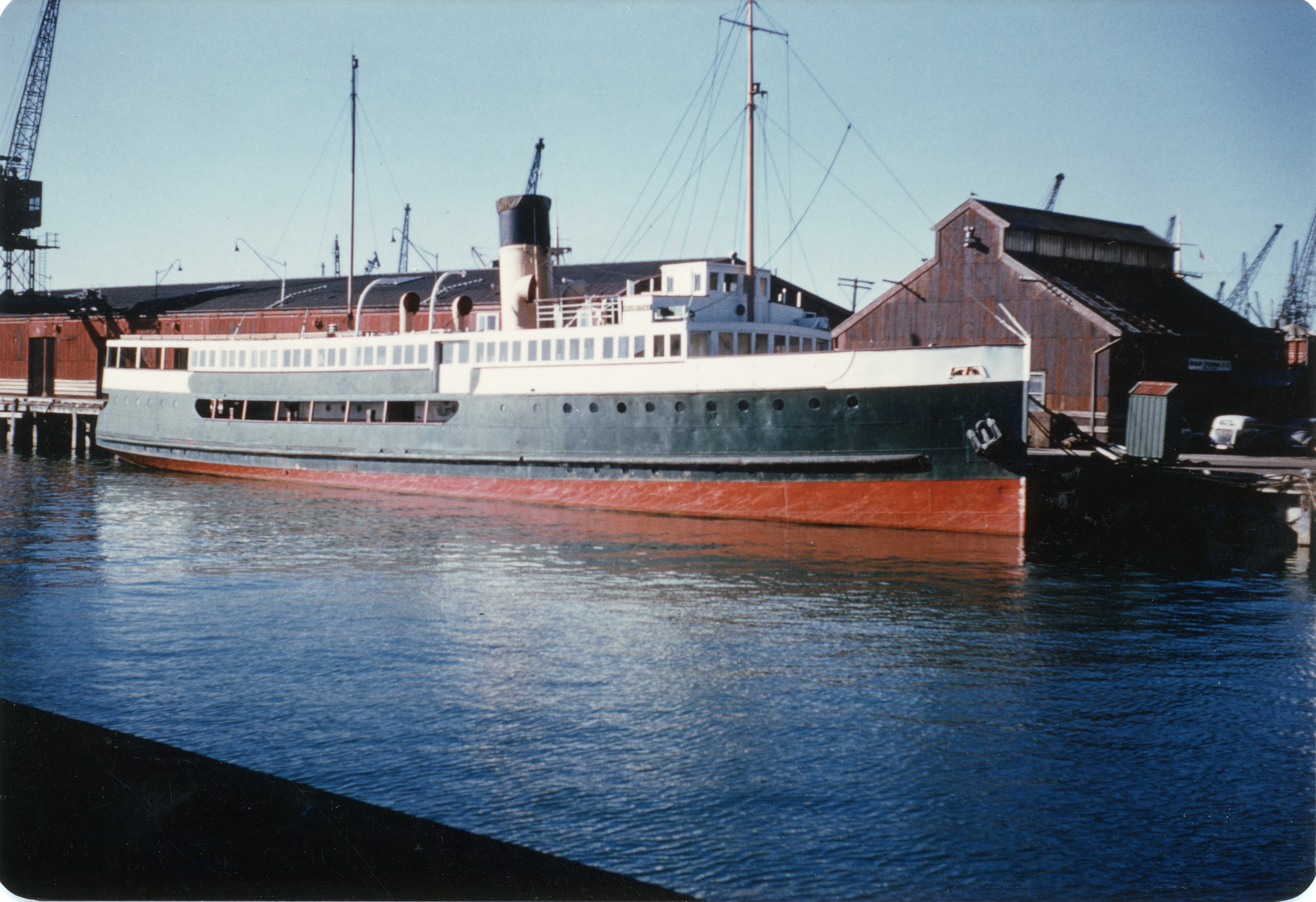
- Muritai laid up during the mid 1950s.

History

New Zealand
- Name: Muritai
- Owner: Eastbourne Borough Council (1923–1940); Royal New Zealand Navy (1940–1946); Devonport Steam Ferry Company (1946–1954); Waiheke Shipping Company (1954–1962)
- Ordered: 1922
- Builder: Coaster Construction Co. Ltd, Montrose
- Launched: 20 December 1922
- Decommissioned: 1945
- In service: 1946
- Out of service: 1963
- Identification: Pennant numbers: T05

General characteristics
- Tonnage: 462 GRT
- Length: 165.3 ft (50.4 m) bpp, 172 ft (52 m) oa
- Beam: 30.1 ft (9.2 m)
- Propulsion: Twin screws, 2 steam-reciprocating triple-expansion engines
- Speed: 13 knots (24 km/h; 15 mph)

SS Muritai was a ferry built in 1922, for use as a Wellington Harbour ferry. She was later used by the Royal New Zealand Navy as a minesweeper, and training ship. After World War II, she operated as an Auckland–Waiheke ferry before finally being hulked in 1962, and scrapped in 1971.

== Construction ==
Muritai was ordered by the Eastbourne Borough Council in 1922 as a new Days Bay ferry; the order was sent to the Coaster Construction Company, based in Montrose, Scotland. The ferry was designed to be 172 feet (52 m) overall in length, have a speed of 13 knots, and have a carrying capacity for 1,500 passengers. Muritai was launched on 20 December 1922, being christened by Mary Jane Hill Allen, the wife of Sir James Allen, the New Zealand high commissioner to the United Kingdom.

Muritai was completed in early February 1923, but trials were delayed until mid February due to poor weather. Once trials were held it was said they were very successful, and the vessel sailed from Montrose on 23 February 1923. She would shelter in Southampton on 25 February, owing to a strong westerly gale, continuing her voyage on 3 March. Muritai arrived in Wellington at 9:20 pm on 16 May 1923, with the harbourmaster berthing her at 10:30 pm, watched by a large crowd of people. After she was tied up, Muritai was opened to the public for inspection. She was then hauled up on the Evans Bay Patent Slip, having her hull repainted and cleaned, and her tailshafts withdrawn for examination. Trials were held on 2 June 1923, and were considered satisfactory, though she did not reach her desired speed, and so new propellers were ordered to correct the issue. Muritai was formally handed over to the Eastbourne Borough Council on 17 July 1923, entering service two days later on 19 July.

== Wellington Harbour ferry ==
On 21 August 1923, a little over a month after Muritai entered service, while backing out of the Wellington ferry wharf during a strong southerly breeze, a squall swung her stern into the SS Naringa, denting several of the latter's plates; an examination found that some rivets on Naringa had loosened, but Muritai avoided any major damages thanks to her fenders protecting her hull. On 25 September, the propellers that were orderded in July were installed on Muritai, and speed trials were held on 1 October, with Muritai reaching a speed of 13½ knots. The trials were satisfactory to the council and she once again entered service.

On the night of 12 February 1925, there was an attempt made to set Muritai adrift while her night watchman left the ship temporarily; once he returned he found three lines holding the ship's bow were severed, with her aft lines remaining intact.

On 17 July 1925, following a routine survey on the Evans Bay Patent Slip, Muritai was found to be leaking badly aft after coming off the cradle, and she was hastily grounded at Balaena Bay, with a diver summoned from the patent slip finding that a tailshaft clamp had been pulled out when the ship went underway, opening a six-inch (15 cm) hole through which the water poured in. The hole was plugged, and water was pumped out. The Duchess then towed Muritai into deep water, then back to the patent slipway, securing her to the patent slip's wharf.

On 4 December 1925, shortly after leaving the wharf at Days Bay during a heavy northerly gale, one of Muritai's rudder chains snapped, and the ferry drifted until anchors were dropped and held close by Ward Island. A nearby steamship went to Muritai's assistance, and after an hour, repairs enabled Muritai to continue on her trip.

Another steering gear failure occurred on 13 January 1932, when her steering gear was carried away, with a complete loss of steering control, and Muritai drifted while turning in circles until the tug Natone came to her assistance and brought her back to her berth. Later that year, on 2 May, while arriving at Wellington, Muritai collided with the auxiliary scow Echo; no damage was done to Muritai and there was very little damage done to Echo, and the latter continued on to Blenheim.

== World War II ==
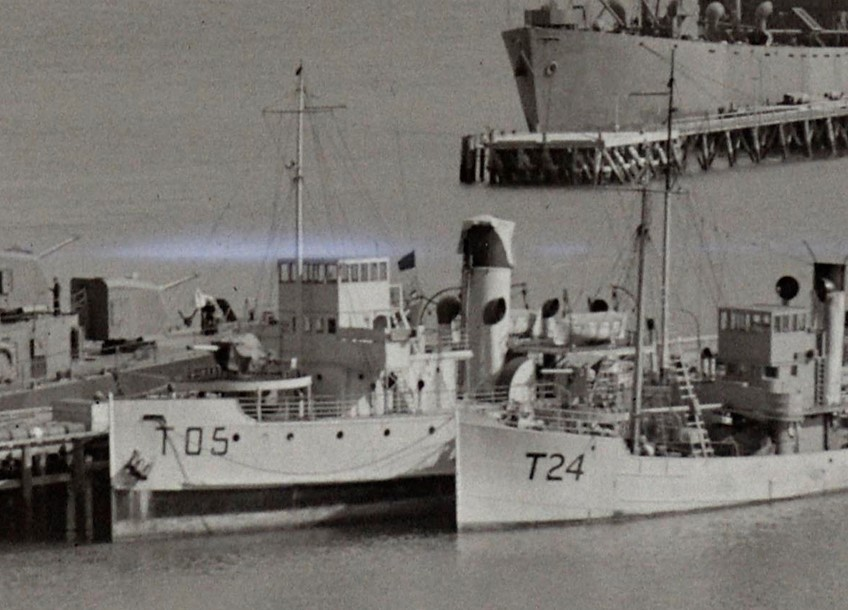
Muritai with Aroha

In August 1940, Muritai was taken over by the Royal New Zealand Navy to replace the inadequate trawler Nora Niven as a minesweeper. Muritai was fitted out as a minesweeper with two winches from the Port Bowen, which wrecked at Wanganui in 1939, After a galley and accommodation were added, Muritai was commissioned at Wellington on 18 September 1940. She would operate out of Wellington until December 1940, carrying out routine sweeping, and helped search for the raider Orion in November that year. She then operated out of Auckland in December 1940, joining the 25th Minesweeping Flotilla, and had a 4‑inch gun fitted. She returned to Wellington in mid 1941 and operated there until August that year, before going back to Auckland and having asdic fitted on her, being the first in New Zealand to have it installed. In January 1942, she wend back to Wellington to do escort work, including standing by the Rapaki in heavy weather while off Stephens Island on 7 January. Muritai then sailed to Suva, departing in early January, and arriving on 24 January 1942, along with the minesweeper Rata. She returned from Suva in April 1942 along with minesweepers Kaiwaka and Coastguard. Upon returning, she was refitted and returned to service in June 1942, taking up anti-submarine loop guard duties with James Cosgrove. In late 1942, it was proposed to convert Muritai into a loop minelayer, and an AS cable maintenance ship, paying off on 3 May 1943 to start the conversion. However, the Calliope Dock was too busy to start her conversion, and the conversion was abandoned in favour of repairing an American ship. Muritai then joined the 7th Trawler Group in August 1943. On 27 October 1943, she was struck by HMNZS Killegray, and was struck by her again three days later. Muritai was transferred on 1 June 1944 to HMNZS Tamaki for sea training of new entries, but she remained available for minesweeping with the 97th Auxiliary Minesweeping Division. Muritai ended this role in September 1945, and she started work as a base and accommodation ship for the scow Vesper on lifting cables and loops in the Hauraki Gulf during October 1945. Muritai was finally paid off on 22 May 1946.

== Post-war service as a Waiheke ferry ==
In July 1946, Muritai was sold to the Devonport Steam Ferry Company, for use as a ferry on the Auckland–Waiheke Island run, with the intention of renaming her to Waiheke, though this never happened. Unfortunately for the company, Muritai had high running costs, and she was sold to the Waiheke Shipping Company in October 1954, who ran her each summer season until October 1962, when she was put up for sale.

== Fate ==
Muritai was sold in December 1962 and hulked; in September 1963, her hulk was towed and sunk at the jetty on Karamuramau Island, as a breakwater for shingle loading. Her hulk remained there until late February 1971, when she was towed back to Auckland and broken up by Pacific Scrap Ltd.
