= HMNZS Arabis =

Modified Flower-class corvette

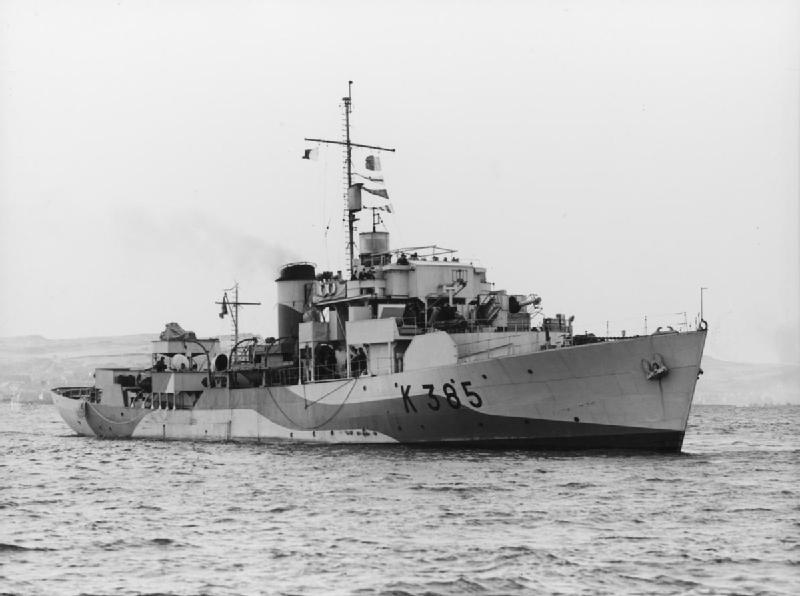

History

New Zealand
- Builder: George Brown & Co, Scotland
- Commissioned: 1944
- Decommissioned: 1948
- Identification: Pennant number: K385
- Fate: broken up August 1951

General characteristics
- Class & type: Flower-class corvette
- Displacement: 980 tons standard; 1,350 tons full load
- Length: 63.5 m (208 ft) o/a
- Beam: 10.1 m (33 ft)
- Draught: 5.3 m (17 ft)
- Propulsion: 2 fire tube oilers, one 4-cycle triple-expansion steam engine 2,880 ihp (2,130 kW)
- Speed: 16 knots (30 km/h) at 2,750 hp (2,050 kW)
- Range: 3,500 nautical miles (6,500 km) at 12 knots (22 km/h)
- Complement: 85
- Sensors & processing systems: ASDIC, radar
- Armament: 1 × BL 4 in (102 mm) Mk IX gun; 8 × 20 mm Oerlikon anti-aircraft guns; ATW Hedgehog anti-submarine mortar; Depth charge projectors: 72 depth charges

HMNZS Arabis (K385) was a modified Flower-class corvette of the Royal New Zealand Navy (RNZN). Built for the British Royal Navy as HMS Arabis, she was transferred to the RNZN on completion. She was commissioned in 1944 and decommissioned in 1948.

After a refit, Arabis sailed for the Solomons, arriving at Renard Sound on 14 December 1944 where her captain took over as senior officer, 25th Minesweeper Flotilla, from Matai. She returned to Auckland on 20 June 1945. Two voyages to Nouméa followed in July 1945 to escort with Tui the twelve RNZN Fairmiles back home to Auckland.

== Fate ==
Arabis was decommissioned in 1948, and broken up for scrap in 1951.

== See also ==
- Corvettes of the Royal New Zealand Navy
