= Royal New Zealand Naval Volunteer Reserve =

- Te Taua Moana o Aotearoa (Māori)
- Founded: 1 October 1941; 84 years ago
- Country: Dominion of New Zealand (1941–1947); New Zealand (1947–present)
- Type: Navy
- Role: Assisting the active fleet in Maritime security, Securing trade routes & the EEZ, Disaster relief, and Naval warfare etc.
- Size: 237 (as of 2007)
- Part of: New Zealand Defence Force
- Garrison/HQ: Devonport Naval Base
- Colors: Red; White
- Anniversaries: 1 October 1941 (RNZN founded)
- Engagements: World War II; Korean War; Malayan Emergency; Cross border attacks in Sabah; Indonesia–Malaysia confrontation; Iran–Iraq War; Gulf War; Solomon Islands; East Timor; Operation Enduring Freedom
- Website: https://www.nzdf.mil.nz/navy/

Commanders
- Governor-General and Commander-in-Chief: Dame Alcyion Cynthia Kiro
- Chief of Defence Force: Air Marshal Kevin Short
- Chief of Navy: Rear Admiral David Proctor

Insignia
- Naval ensign

- Naval jack

- King's Colour

The Royal New Zealand Naval Volunteer Reserve (RNZNVR) is the volunteer reserve force of the Royal New Zealand Navy (RNZN).

== History ==
=== Early history ===
The first Naval Volunteer units were formed in Auckland and Nelson in 1858. Over the rest of the 19th century Naval Volunteer units were formed in various ports such as Bluff, Wanganui, and Wairoa. These were reorganised into Naval Artillery Volunteers in 1883.

The Volunteers, or "Navals", peaked after the Russian-scare in the 1880s with a total of 20 units. Volunteers were trained in boats, taught gunnery, and manned some of the coastal batteries at the four main ports. Later they were also trained in mining submarines and maintaining minefields that were laid in Auckland and Wellington harbours.

The Naval Volunteers supplemented a small number of regular soldiers known as the Permanent Militia. The Permanent Militia included the New Zealand Torpedo Corps who were responsible for manning the four Defender-class torpedo boats and the Submarine Mining Corps.

In 1902 the Volunteers were further reorganised into the Garrison Artillery Volunteers. In a special report in 1919, Admiral of the Fleet Lord Jellicoe recommended that New Zealand acquire 18 minesweepers.

=== Royal Naval Volunteer Reserve ===
The next major reorganisation occurred in 1926 when the New Zealand Division of the Royal Navy was formed. A unit of the Royal Naval Volunteer Reserve was established in Auckland and further units were opened in Wellington, Christchurch and Dunedin two years later.

The Government finally responded to Jellicoe's report by purchasing one second-hand minesweeping trawler, HMS Wakakura. This was the sole training ship for the Naval Reserve until the beginning of World War II. Wakakura moved from port to port so each unit could have its share of sea training and live gunnery practice.

By 1939 the need to protect merchant ships from mines which might be laid round the coast was becoming increasingly apparent. There were, at that point, 78 officers and 610 ratings active in the New Zealand Division of the Royal Naval Volunteer Reserve.

=== War years ===
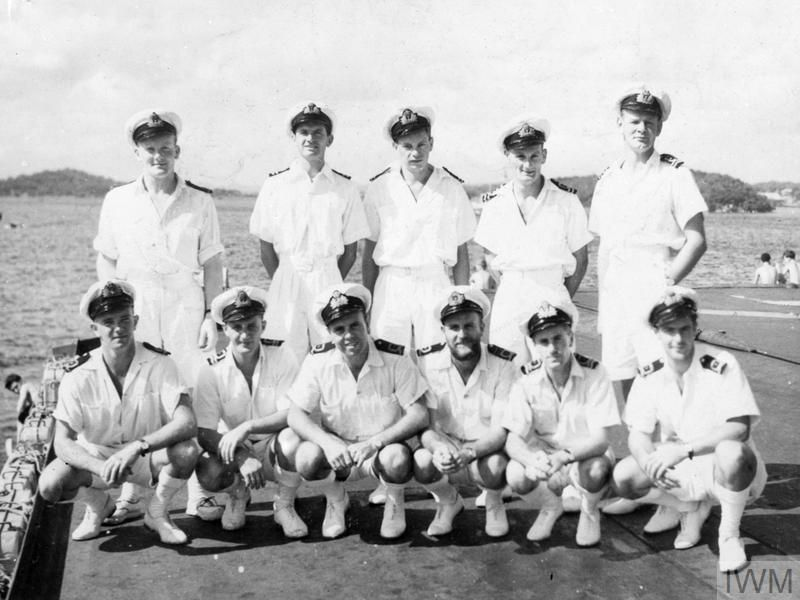
RNZNVR officers of HMS Illustrious during the Second World War

The declaration of War in 1939 saw the normal activity of the Naval Reserve suspended. Its personnel were called up for war service. Early in the war some Reserve personnel were drafted to duties as gunners on merchant ships or to serve on Royal Navy ships, or they embarked for further training in the United Kingdom.

On 1 October 1941 New Zealand Naval forces ceased to exist. King George VI consented to the formation of the Royal New Zealand Navy and the New Zealand navy was no longer a mere division of the Royal Navy. All ships and training bases were recommissioned into the new navy, and the prefix "HMS" to their names were replaced with "HMNZS".

Of the 1700 Naval Reservists who trained prior to the outbreak of war, 139 lost their lives, 80 in the sinking of HMS Neptune.

=== Becomes the RNZNVR ===
At the end of war plans to reconstitute the Naval Reserve were put into operation. Officers were selected from those who had been demobilised and recruiting began in September 1948 with the intention of reaching a strength of 70 officers and 600 ratings. It would now be called the Royal New Zealand Naval Volunteer Reserve.

In 1947 the Government transferred a Harbour Defence Motor Launch to each unit. Naval Reservists also trained in Royal New Zealand Navy cruisers, frigates and minesweepers but the motor launches were now the mainstay of seamanship training. Training in general was focused, as in the regular force, on training Seamen, Gunners, Communicators, Radar Plotters, Electricians, Marine Engineers, Medical Assistants and Clerks.

From 1978, as the ships of the regular force became more and more complex, Naval Reserve training focused on patrol craft seamanship and engineering, and on the protection of merchant shipping. Around 1984 the motor launches were upgraded to Moa class inshore patrol boats (IPVs).

The shift in focus stemmed from the understanding that military control of vital seaborne trade was imperative for New Zealand's survival. The basic principle of effectively managing and protecting seaborne trade remains a basic Naval Reserve task today.

== Current status ==
The current RNZNVR Mission is: "To contribute to the Navy mission by providing competent Reserve personnel fit for service". The Naval Volunteer Reserve are part-time people, the seagoing equivalent of Army Territorials. Reservists are typically people with regular jobs, although many are also tertiary students or full-time parents, who get paid for the spare time they spend as a member of the Naval Reserve. They formerly crewed the inshore patrol vessels and have opportunities to work with regular force either at sea, ashore or overseas on peacekeeping missions. As of 1 July 2007 there were 237 people in the Naval Reserve. As of 2026, the New Zealand Defence Force writes in their website: "The Naval Volunteer Reserve is a part-time force of around 500 people".

The RNZNVR is currently organised into four regional units. Each unit has its own training headquarters under the command of a senior Reserve officer, and number up to 60 Naval Reserve personnel. The units are also commissioned ships, in the tradition of Royal Navy stone frigates, and each bears the prefix "HMNZS" (His Majesty's New Zealand Ship).

Unit	Region	Notes
HMNZS Ngapona	Auckland	with a satellite unit at Tauranga
HMNZS Olphert	Wellington	
HMNZS Pegasus	Christchurch	
HMNZS Toroa	Dunedin	

Volunteers can join one of three branches of the RNZNVR

- Administration
- Sea Service (for service on inshore patrol vessels)
- Maritime Trade Organisation (formerly Naval Control of Shipping).

== Notable members ==
Criteria for inclusion: Has their own Wikipedia article which notes their membership in the Reserve

- Charles Blackie QSO VRD
- Gordon Bridson
- Phil Connolly
- Derek Freeman
- Denis Glover DSC
- Mark Hadlow
- Peter Phipps, Vice Admiral Sir KBE DSC& Bar VRD
- Tom Schnackenberg OBE OAM Sub-Lt Ngapona 1965–67 Holds Honorary Rank RNZN
- Richard Worth Captain OBE VRD KStJ Former National MP
- Arch Jelley CNZM OBE Athletic coach of Olympian Gold Medalist John Walker Russian Convoy
- Connell Thode MiD(2) Only RNZNVR officer to command a submarine during WW2. Involved in the Spirit of Adventure programme in Auckland.

== See also ==
- New Zealand Sea Cadet Corps
