= Logistics ships of the Royal New Zealand Navy =

Commissioned logistic and support vessels of the Royal New Zealand Navy from its formation on 1 October 1941 to the present:

Name	Type	Dates	Notes
HMNZS Aotearoa (A11)	Fleet tanker	2021–current	
HMNZS Canterbury (L421)	Logistics support ship	2007–current	Multi-role vessel
HMNZS Charles Upham	Logistics support ship	1995–1998	Mercandian 2-in-1 class roll-on/roll-off vessel
HMNZS Endeavour (1956)	Antarctic support ship	1956–1962	
HMNZS Endeavour (A11)	Fleet tanker	1988–2017	
HMNZS Endeavour (A184)	Antarctic support ship	1962–1971	Leased from the US
HS Maunganui	Hospital ship	1941–1946	Converted from a civilian vessel.

== See also ==
- Current Royal New Zealand Navy ships
- List of ships of the Royal New Zealand Navy
