= Diving tenders of the Royal New Zealand Navy =

Diving tenders of the Royal New Zealand Navy from its formation on 1 October 1941 to the present. There have been four diving tenders, all with the same name. The latest tender was commissioned in 2019 and it sunk in 2024.

Name	Dates	Notes
Manawanui i	1953–1978	
Manawanui ii	1979–1988	In 1988 was renamed Kahu and recommissioned as a training boat and backup diving tender.
Manawanui iii	1988–2018	
Manawanui iv	2019–2024	Also functioned as a hydrographic survey ship.

Manawanui is a Māori word meaning "to be brave or steadfast".

== See also ==
- RNZN Hyperbaric Unit
- Current Royal New Zealand Navy ships
- List of ships of the Royal New Zealand Navy

== Sources ==
- McDougall, R J (1989) New Zealand Naval Vessels. Page 136–141. Government Printing Office. ISBN 978-0-477-01399-4
- Royal New Zealand Navy Official web site
