= HMNZS Kahu =

HMNZS Kahu has been the name of the following ships of the Royal New Zealand Navy:

- HMNZS Kahu (ML400), a Fairmile B motor launch, 1943–1965
- HMNZS Kahu (A04), a Moa-class patrol boat used for training purposes, 1988–2009
