= HMNZS Manawanui =

HMNZS Manawanui can refer to

- HMNZS Manawanui (1948) – the first diving tender of the New Zealand navy from 1953 to 1978
- HMNZDT Manawanui (1978) – the second diving tender, renamed as HMNZS Kahu in 1988
- HMNZS Manawanui (A09) – diving tender commissioned in 1988, decommissioned in 2018
- HMNZS Manawanui (2019) – hydrographic and diving support vessel commissioned in 2019 and sunk in 2024
