= HMNZS Charles Upham =

1984 Royal New Zealand Navy ship

History

Civilian service
- Name: Mercandian Queen II (1984–1992, 1992–1994); Continental Queen II (1992); Sealift (1994–1995); Don Carlos (1998–2007); Don Carlos II (2007–2009); Nusantara Sejati (2009–present)
- Owner: Mercandia (1984–1994); Government of New Zealand (1994–1995); Contenemar SA (2001–2009); PT Pelayaran Putra Sejati (2009–present)
- Builder: Frederikshavns Vft, Frederikshavn
- Yard number: 407
- Launched: 16 December 1983
- Completed: 6 April 1984
- Identification: IMO number: 8131128
- Status: Active in 2024

History

New Zealand
- Name: HMNZS Charles Upham
- Namesake: Charles Upham
- Acquired: 16 December 1994
- Commissioned: 18 October 1995
- Decommissioned: July 2001
- Nickname(s): "Charles Chuckam"; "Chuck-Up"; "The Calliope South Windbreak"
- Fate: Sold back into civilian service

General characteristics
- Class & type: Mercardian 2-in-1 class roll-on/roll-off vessel
- Displacement: 7,995 tonnes (7,869 long tons; 8,813 short tons) light; 10,500 tonnes (10,300 long tons; 11,600 short tons) full load
- Length: 131.7 metres (432 ft)
- Beam: 21.1 metres (69 ft)
- Draught: 6.2 metres (20 ft)
- Ramps: 1 stern ramp, 1 starboard ramp
- Installed power: 4,890 horsepower (3,650 kW)
- Propulsion: 1 × MaK M 453AK diesel motor; 1 × controllable-pitch propeller; 1 × bow thruster
- Speed: 14 knots (26 km/h; 16 mph)
- Range: 7,000 nautical miles (13,000 km; 8,100 mi) at 15 knots (28 km/h; 17 mph)
- Capacity: Up to 7,000 tonnes (6,900 long tons; 7,700 short tons) of cargo (civilian service)
- Complement: 17 (civilian service); 8 officers, 24 sailors (military service)
- Sensors & processing systems: 2 × I-band navigational radars
- Electronic warfare & decoys: 2 × SRBOC Mark 36 launchers (military service)
- Armament: 4 × 12.7-millimetre (0.50 in) machine guns (military service)

HMNZS Charles Upham (A02) was a Mercandian 2-in-1 class roll-on/roll-off vessel operated by the Royal New Zealand Navy (RNZN) between 1994 and 2001. The vessel was built for the Danish shipping company Mercandia during the early 1980s, and operated under the names Mercandian Queen II and Continental Queen II. The New Zealand Defence Force had identified the need for a logistic support ship as early as the 1970s but it was not until the 1991 white paper that planning to acquire a ship commenced in earnest. Mercandian Queen II was for sale around that time, and although not as capable as the RNZN had initially specified, was purchased in 1994.

The ship arrived in New Zealand in 1995 under the name Sealift, and was commissioned later that year as HMNZS Charles Upham, after the only combat soldier to be awarded the Victoria Cross twice, Captain Charles Upham. After some modification, the ship made two voyages to test her capabilities and determine what further work was required to make her fully operational. Significant problems with stability and seakeeping were encountered during the second voyage, and the ship was removed from service on her return. The cost of fixing the stability problems and fitting Charles Upham out for troop and vehicle transport was prohibitive, and the work was postponed. In the meantime, the ship was chartered to Spanish company Contenemar SA in 1998 and used to transport citrus fruit around the Mediterranean.

By 2001, the New Zealand government had decided that Charles Upham was unusable and should be sold. The ship was sold to Contenemar (who operated her under the name Don Carlos, then Don Carlos II), then converted into a vehicle carrier and onsold in 2009 to Indonesian company PT Pelayaran Putra Sejati (operating as Nusantara Sejati). In the meantime, the RNZN sought to acquire a new logistic vessel, with HMNZS Canterbury entering service in 2007.

== Design and construction ==
The vessel was one of 137 cargo vessels built by Danish shipping company Mercandia between 1964 and 1996 for their worldwide shipping fleet. The ship is of the Mercandian 2-in-1 class design, with a displacement of 7,995 tonnes (7,869 long tons; 8,813 short tons) at light load, and 10,500 tonnes (10,300 long tons; 11,600 short tons) at full load. She is 131.7 metres (432 ft) long, with a beam of 21.1 metres (69 ft), and a draught of 6.2 metres (20 ft). The propulsion system consists of a MaK M 453AK diesel motor, which supplied 4,890 horsepower (3,650 kW) to a single controllable-pitch propeller. This was supplemented by a bow thruster. Maximum speed was 14 knots (26 km/h; 16 mph), and maximum range was 7,000 nautical miles (13,000 km; 8,100 mi) at 15 knots (28 km/h; 17 mph).

The ship had a two ramps for vehicle loading; one at the stern, the other on the starboard side. She was designed to carry up to 7,000 tonnes (6,900 long tons; 7,700 short tons) of cargo. The crew complement was 17 strong, and the ship was fitted with two I-band navigational radars.

The vessel was built by Frederikshavns Værft in Frederikshavn, Denmark. Laid down as yard number 407, she was launched on 16 December 1983, and completed on 6 April 1984. The vessel was assigned the IMO Number 8131128.

== Operational history ==
=== Early civilian service ===
The ship was built for and operated by Danish shipping company Mercandia, and was flagged as a Danish vessel. During her initial civilian career, the vessel operated under the name Mercandian Queen II, except for a period during 1992 when she was briefly named Continental Queen II.

=== RNZN acquisition ===
The RNZN began to identify the need for a logistic support ship in the 1970s. Such a ship would be used to support the defence and foreign policies of the New Zealand government, particularly in the South Pacific region by providing sealift for the New Zealand Army's Ready Reaction Force (RRF), with secondary roles including disaster relief, civil defence, Antarctic supply, and United Nations operations. The 1978 Defence Review noted the need for such a vessel, with attention drawn back to the acquisition of such a ship in the 1987 Defence White Paper. A 1988 study indicated that the minimum requirement was a vessel able to transport 200 soldiers and equipment, and unload them either through beach landings or wharf facilities. The need for a transport vessel was again identified in the 1991 Defence White Paper, with such a vessel essential to meet the tasks specified for the New Zealand Defence Force in that document. A review subsequent to the 1991 White Paper proposed a less-capable vessel than previously, with the ship able to perform wharf landings only. As well as the transportation of soldiers, the ship was envisaged for use during civil emergencies in South Pacific nations to deliver supplies of extract New Zealand citizens, and to keep transport routes to New Zealand's offshore islands, or across Cook Strait, if civilian services became restricted or unavailable. The review concluded that the acquisition of a mid-size roll-on/roll-off vessel for use as a military sealift ship should be prioritised; a Mercandian 1500-type vessel, capable of transporting 50% of the RRF's vehicles and equipment, was seen as the minimum standard, although a larger vessel like Union Rotorua, almost able to deploy the entire RRF, was preferred.

Union Rotorua was the first ship considered for acquisition, with inspection beginning in November 1991, but after the New Zealand Defence Force began to look at other vessels in mid-1992, Union Rotorua was dropped from contention. In researching New Zealand defence acquisitions, Peter Greener claims he can find no clear reason for Union Rotorua to be dropped, but identifies the size of the 205-metre (673 ft) ship, which would have been by far the largest vessel ever operated by the RNZN, and the gas-turbine propulsion system, which was due for overhaul, as factors. Shipbroking company Rugg and Co was contracted in July 1992 to identify civilian ships that met the RNZN's criteria and were available to purchase second-hand; the company returned a list of 33 ships of 20 classes, which the Defence Force culled to 21 ships of 9 classes, then again to 4 classes. In October 1992, around the same time as the second revision or Rugg and Co's list, shipyards in Spain, Korea, and Poland were asked about the cost of new-build vessels. By January 1993, a Mercandian 2-in-1 class vessel was identified as the preferred type; although there was a loss of capability compared to a purpose-built vessel, this was seen as an acceptable tradeoff as the RNZN would have great difficulty affording a new ship, particularly after acquiring the Anzac class frigates. An independent review by British company BMT Defence Services indicated that conversion of such a vessel for military service was feasible, but warned that the ramp size and vehicle deck height were smaller than the RNZN had specified, and that motion in heavy conditions, particularly with the later-planned modification to carry helicopters, was a concern. Approval was sought from Cabinet in April 1993 to purchase a ship, although the decision to buy a new-build or second-hand vessel was unresolved. The Australian government offered to lease or sell the Royal Australian Navy's heavy lift ship, HMAS Tobruk, to the New Zealanders in late 1993; although the offer was responded to favourably, it was rejected because of the lower cargo capacity and higher personnel requirement compared to the Mercandian design, despite Tobruk's capability for beach landings.

The decision to acquire a second-hand Mercandian 2-in-1 class ship was made in July 1994. Rugg and Co was asked to provide a list of such ships available; they advised that the only ship available was Mercandian Queen II, which had just come back onto the market after a previous sale fell through, and Cabinet approval was secured on 28 November 1994. The ship was purchased from Mercandia on 16 December 1994 for NZ$14.15 million or 55 million Danish Kronor. She was sailed to New Zealand with a cargo and as a New Zealand-flagged merchant vessel under the name Sealift to offset costs, arrived on 14 March 1995, and was commissioned into the RNZN as HMZNS Charles Upham (named after dual Victoria Cross winner Charles Upham) on 18 October 1995. Before entering operational service, she was fitted with naval communications equipment, along with four 12.7-millimetre (0.50 in) machine guns and two SRBOC Mark 36 launchers for self-defence, and increased accommodation facilities. In military service, the ship's company consisted of 8 officers and 24 sailors.

=== RNZN career ===
During 1996, Charles Upham made two operational voyages to test the ship's capabilities. The first was between Napier and Lyttelton, then on 24 June, the vessel sailed from Auckland to Fiji as part of Exercise Tropic Dust. En route to Fiji, the lightly laden Charles Upham showed a propensity to roll, and reached 37 degrees from centre during one heavy storm; the degree of roll caused the main fuel pump to fail and the ship experienced a broaching effect. The conditions led to the ship being nicknamed "Charles Chuckam" and "Chuck-Up", and the commanding officer was so concerned for the safety of the ship and his personnel that on return to New Zealand on 3 August, Charles Upham was withdrawn from service until modifications could be made to improve stability. Other alterations planned as part of this conversion included the installation of a flight deck and facilities for two mid-size helicopters, and an increase in soldier accommodation by 100, bringing the number of available berths for ship's personnel and passengers to 215. Investigation found that up to 3,500 tonnes (3,400 long tons; 3,900 short tons) of cargo or ballast (half the ship's designed load) was required to minimise excessive motion, and operation of a helicopter in even these conditions would be limited. Cargo unloading capability at undeveloped or damaged wharves was also found to be poor, with cranes unable to be fitted because they would further compromise stability, and container forklifts were too heavy for the ship's 17-tonne (17-long-ton; 19-short-ton)-per-axle deck weight limit.

The ship was berthed at Devonport Naval Base until the problems could be addressed; this was slow in coming, and by June 1997, Charles Upham was being referred to as "the Calliope South Windbreak". Delays included a reassessment of Defence finances and operational requirements prioritising spending on the Army, and government calls for an independent report into the ship's acquisition and suitability for conversion. The report found that the vessel had been acquired reasonably and was suitable for modification, although the new Alliance Party criticised this review as a whitewash. In October 1997, Cabinet agreed that conversion of the vessel would be considered in 2000, near the end of the three-year planning cycle. A month later, the Alliance Party published The Scandal of The Chales Upham the first of two booklets criticising the ship and her acquisition. By April 1998, pressures on the defence budget caused priority for funding the conversion to be reduced, and the RNZN made Charles Upham available for civilian charter until such funding became available again. In early 1998, the ballast tanks were refitted, and an STP was installed.

On 12 May 1998, Charles Upham sailed on a bareboat charter to Spanish company Contenemar SA, where she was used to transport oranges and lemons around the Mediterranean. The Alliance Party released their second booklet, The Biggest Lemon Ever to Leave Auckland, in July 1998, which claimed the sealift ship was "doing a passable imitation between a lemon and a white elephant". To counter the claims being made by the Alliance Party and sections of the media, the Audit Office compiled an internal report in September commenting on the allegations, along with other advice received by the government relating to the ship. To serve the public interest, Defence Minister Max Bradford authorised full disclosure of all information the Ministry of Defence and the RNZN could make public, resulting in the November 1998 publication of the document Official Information Pertaining to the Military Sealift Project HMNZS Charles Upham. In July 1999, the Cabinet gave approval in principle for the conversion to occur.

An election in November 1999 saw the transition from the Fourth National Government to the Fifth Labour Government, and a new review into Charles Upham was ordered. The Sealift Review was completed in November 2000, and found that although the ship had limitations, retaining and modifying the vessel was the most cost-effective option for maintaining a strategic sealift capability. Despite this, the Cabinet agreed in April 2001 to a proposal that called for the sale of Charles Upham once her Spanish charter ended, and address the reacquisition of sealift capability at the same time as the replacement for the frigate HMNZS Canterbury (F421). On 9 May, plans to sell the ship were announced. Charles Upham was decommissioned and sold outright to Contenemar in July for NZ$8.6 million. The RNZN then sought to acquire sealift capability through Project Protector, resulting in the acquisition of the multi-role vessel HMNZS Canterbury (L421) in 2007.

=== Post-military career ===
In Contenemar service, the ship initially operated under the name Don Carlos (a name that began use during the company's charter of the naval vessel), then was renamed Don Carlos II in 2007. In 2008, the vessel was converted for use as a vehicle carrier. She was sold in 2009 to Indonesian company PT Pelayaran Putra Sejati, and renamed Nusantara Sejati.

She was active in 2021, with no information since in the database of VesselFinder website.

As of June 2024 she was actively sailing.

== See also ==
- Logistic ships of the Royal New Zealand Navy
