= HMNZS Kahu (A04) =

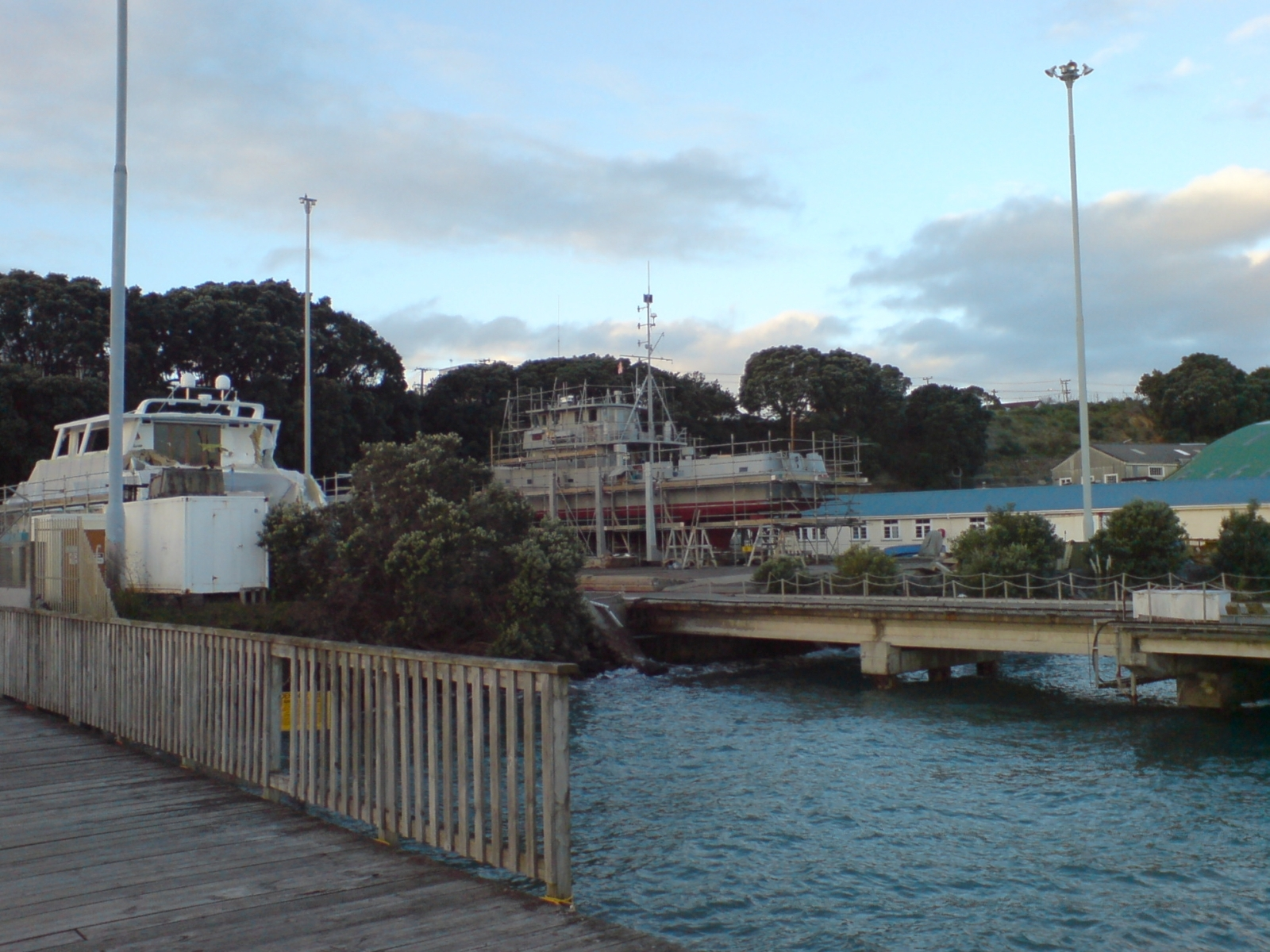
- Being maintained at the Devonport Naval Base in 2008.

History

New Zealand
- Name: Kahu
- Namesake: HMNZS Kahu (ML400)
- Builder: Whangarei Engineering and Construction Company
- Laid down: 8 December 1978
- Completed: May 1979
- Commissioned: 17 May 1988
- Decommissioned: 30 October 2009
- Home port: New Plymouth, New Zealand
- Identification: MMSI number: 512000164; Callsign: ZMG2015
- Fate: Sold for use as a pleasure craft, 2010

General characteristics
- Class & type: Moa-class inshore patrol vessel
- Displacement: 91.5 ton standard; 105 ton full load
- Length: 122 ft (37 m)
- Beam: 6.1 m (20 ft)
- Draught: 2.4 m (7 ft 10 in)
- Decks: 4
- Propulsion: Two Cummins diesels (710 hp (530 kW)) twin shafts
- Speed: 13 knots (24 km/h; 15 mph)
- Range: 3,000 nmi (5,600 km; 3,500 mi)
- Sensors & processing systems: Navigation Radar Racal Decca 916 I Band

HMNZS Kahu (A04) was a Moa-class inshore patrol vessel of the Royal New Zealand Navy. She was launched in 1979 as the lead boat of her class, modified to function as a diving tender. She was initially named HMNZS Manawanui (A09) (1979-1988), the second of, as of 2025, four diving tenders with this name to serve in the New Zealand Navy. As a diving tender she participated in the exploration and salvage work of the wreck MS Mikhail Lermontov in March 1986.

On 17 May 1988, she was renamed HMNZS Kahu (A04) and recommissioned as the basic seamanship and navigation training vessel attached to the Royal New Zealand Naval College. Kahu is the second boat with this name to serve in the New Zealand Navy. (The name comes from the Māori-language kāhu - the name for the native swamp harrier hawk.) The ship was replaced in her role as a diving tender by HMNZS Manawanui (A09).

She remained in service for seamanship, Officer of the Watch training and as a backup diving tender until her decommissioning on 30 October 2009. The ship was sold for use as a pleasure craft on 18 February 2010.

Kahu was distinguished from other boats of the Moa class by the gantry on her quarterdeck and lack of funnels.

== Post RNZN Career ==
After leaving the Royal New Zealand Navy she was sold to Peter White-Robinson and renamed Kahu. In 2011 she underwent a year long refit at Fitzroy Yachts in New Plymouth, converting her to a 'family ship'. In 2013 she was sold.

In 2021 the vessel was involved in a £160,000,000 drugs bust when she was intercepted by HMC Searcher 130 km off the coast of Plymouth. 1 British Citizen and 5 Nicaraguan citizens were arrested. 2000kgs of Cocaine was reported to be onboard.

== See also ==
- Patrol boats of the Royal New Zealand Navy
- Diving tenders of the Royal New Zealand Navy
