= Frigates of the Royal New Zealand Navy =

List of Royal New Zealand Navy Frigates

Commissioned frigates of the Royal New Zealand Navy from its formation on 1 October 1941 to the present:

== Class types ==
=== Loch-class frigates ===
Name	Dates	Career	Fate
HMNZS Hawea (F422)	1948–1965		
HMNZS Kaniere (F426)	1948–1967		
HMNZS Pukaki (F424)	1948–1966		
HMNZS Rotoiti (F625)	1948–1967		
HMNZS Taupo (F421)	1948–1962		
HMNZS Tutira (F517)	1948–1951		

=== Whitby-class (Type 12) frigates ===
Name	Dates	Career	Fate
HMNZS Blackpool (F77)	1966–1971	Former HMS Blackpool on loan from RN	Sold for scrapping in 1978.

=== Rothesay-class (Type 12M) frigates ===
Name	Dates	Career	Fate
HMNZS Otago (F111)	1960–1983	Purchased from RN before completion	Sold for scrapping in 1987.
HMNZS Taranaki (F148)	1960–1982		Sold for scrapping in 1983.

=== Leander-class (Type 12I) frigates ===
Name	Dates	Career	Fate
HMNZS Canterbury (F421)	1971–2005		Scuttled as dive wreck
HMNZS Southland (F104)	1983–1995	Former HMS Dido	Sold and broken up for scrap and parts
HMNZS Waikato (F55)	1965–1998		Scuttled as dive wreck
HMNZS Wellington (F69)	1982–2000	Former HMS Bacchante	Scuttled as dive wreck

=== Anzac-class frigates ===
Name	Dates	Career	Fate
HMNZS Te Kaha (F77)	1997–current		Active
HMNZS Te Mana (F111)	1999–current		Active

== See also ==
- Current Royal New Zealand Navy ships
