= HMNZS Endeavour (A11) =

1987 Royal New Zealand Navy fleet oiler

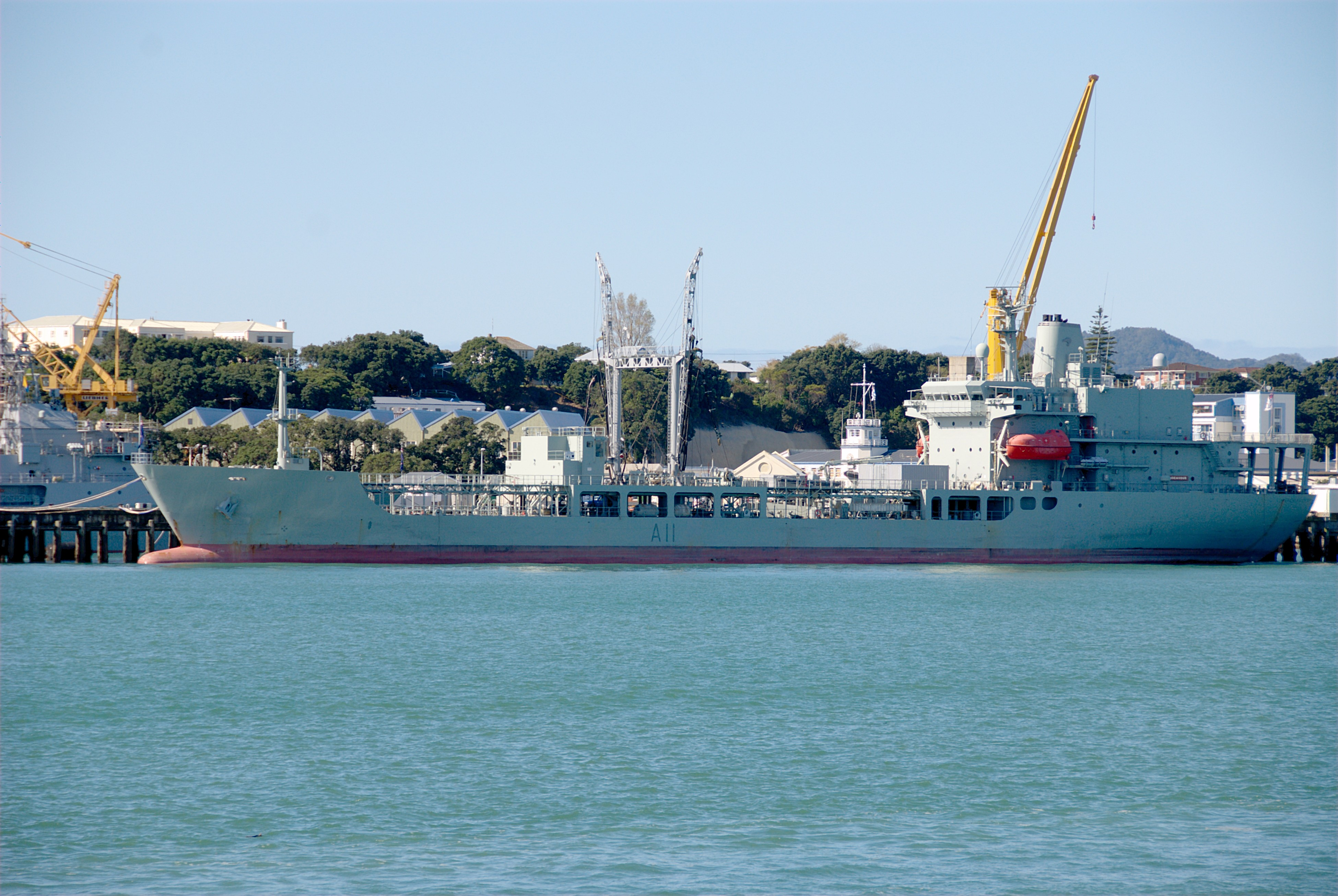
- HMNZS Endeavour berthed at Devonport Naval Base in 2007

History

New Zealand
- Name: HMNZS Endeavour
- Namesake: HM Bark Endeavour
- Commissioned: 8 April 1988
- Decommissioned: 15 December 2017
- Home port: Devonport Naval Base. Ceremonial homeport New Plymouth.
- Identification: IMO number: 8615801; MMSI number: 542405110; Callsign: ZMRZ
- Status: on 27 April 2018 beached in Alang for scrapping

General characteristics
- Displacement: 7,300 tonnes empty; 12,300 tonnes laden
- Length: 138 m (453 ft)
- Beam: 18.4 m (60 ft)
- Draught: 4.5 m (15 ft) empty; 7.6 m (25 ft) laden
- Propulsion: 1 × MAN Burmeister & Wain diesel (5,300 hp)
- Speed: 14 knots (26 km/h; 16 mph)
- Range: 10,000 nautical miles (19,000 km; 12,000 mi)
- Complement: 13 officers, 10 senior ratings, 27 junior ratings

HMNZS Endeavour (A11) was a fleet oiler for the Royal New Zealand Navy. She was named after James Cook's Bark Endeavour and the third ship in the RNZN to carry that name, though if continuity with the Royal Navy ships of the name HMS Endeavour is considered, she is the twelfth. The previous two ships of the RNZN were Antarctic research support vessels. Endeavour was built in South Korea to a commercial design and commissioned on 8 April 1988, and decommissioned on 15 December 2017.

== Operational history ==
Endeavour was the venue for peace talks on Bougainville in July/August 1990. On 23 February 2017, it was announced by NZDF that the New Zealand Operations Service Medal (NZOSM) had been awarded to personnel who were in Bougainville for the Operation BIGTALK peace talks. In December 1997 Endeavour deployed to Bougainville as part of Operation Belisi, the multinational peace-keeping operation following 10 years of civil war in Bougainville. She stayed on station until late January 1998, providing logistic support to ground and air forces ashore.

Endeavour was deployed to East Timor as part of the Australian-led INTERFET peacekeeping taskforce from 21 to 24 September 1999, and from 28 January to 23 February 2000.

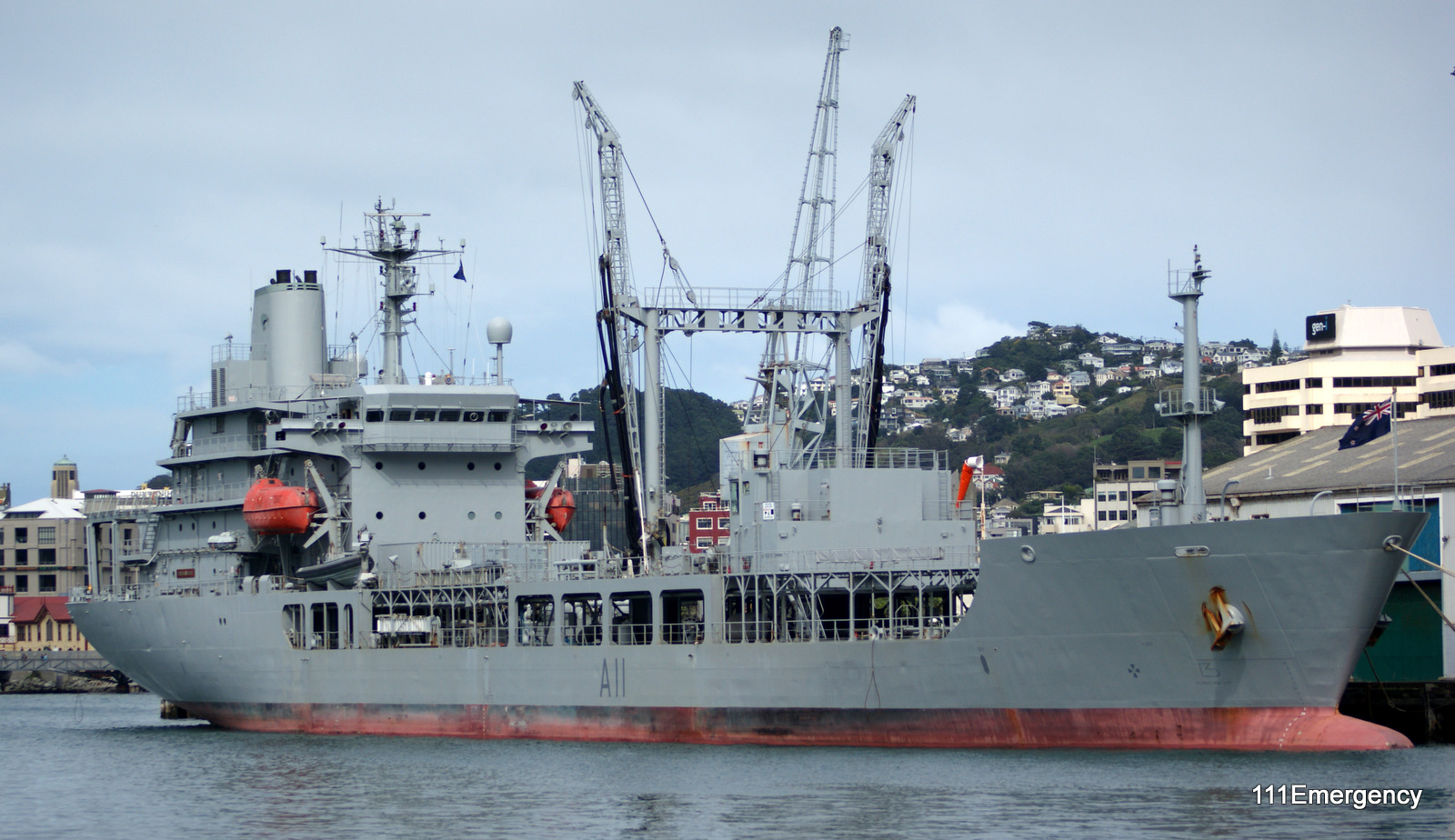
Endeavour during a 2010 visit to Wellington

In January 2010, Endeavour was awarded the Chatham Rosebowl, the award for the best-performing ship in the RNZN. As a result, for all of 2011 she flew the 'E' Pennant for efficiency.

In 2012 Endeavour attended Exercise RIMPAC. The ship also saw service during Exercise Talisman Sabre 2015, refuelling USNS Tippecanoe.

Endeavour was deployed at short notice on 20 September 2017 in an emergency effort to move diesel around New Zealand due to a ruptured fuel pipeline between Marsden Point and Auckland.

Endeavour was decommissioned on 15 December 2017. The ship left Devonport for the final time on 20 March 2018 and was sailed by a civilian crew to Alang in India where she was broken up and recycled by JRD Industries. Under the direct supervision of the NZ Defence Force, a remarkable 98.8% of the ship was either reused or recycled. Completion of the process was finished on 13 September 2018.

== Replacement ==
In 2007 it was discovered that Endeavour would not meet double-hulled tanker standards required by 2013. In 2009 she was given modifications to seal off the outer tanks effectively making her sides double-hulled. Reducing her total fuel capacity by 35%. This including increasing the crew numbers gave the Navy an extension until the end of 2017. In March 2015, a request for tender for a replacement vessel was released by the New Zealand Ministry of Defence.

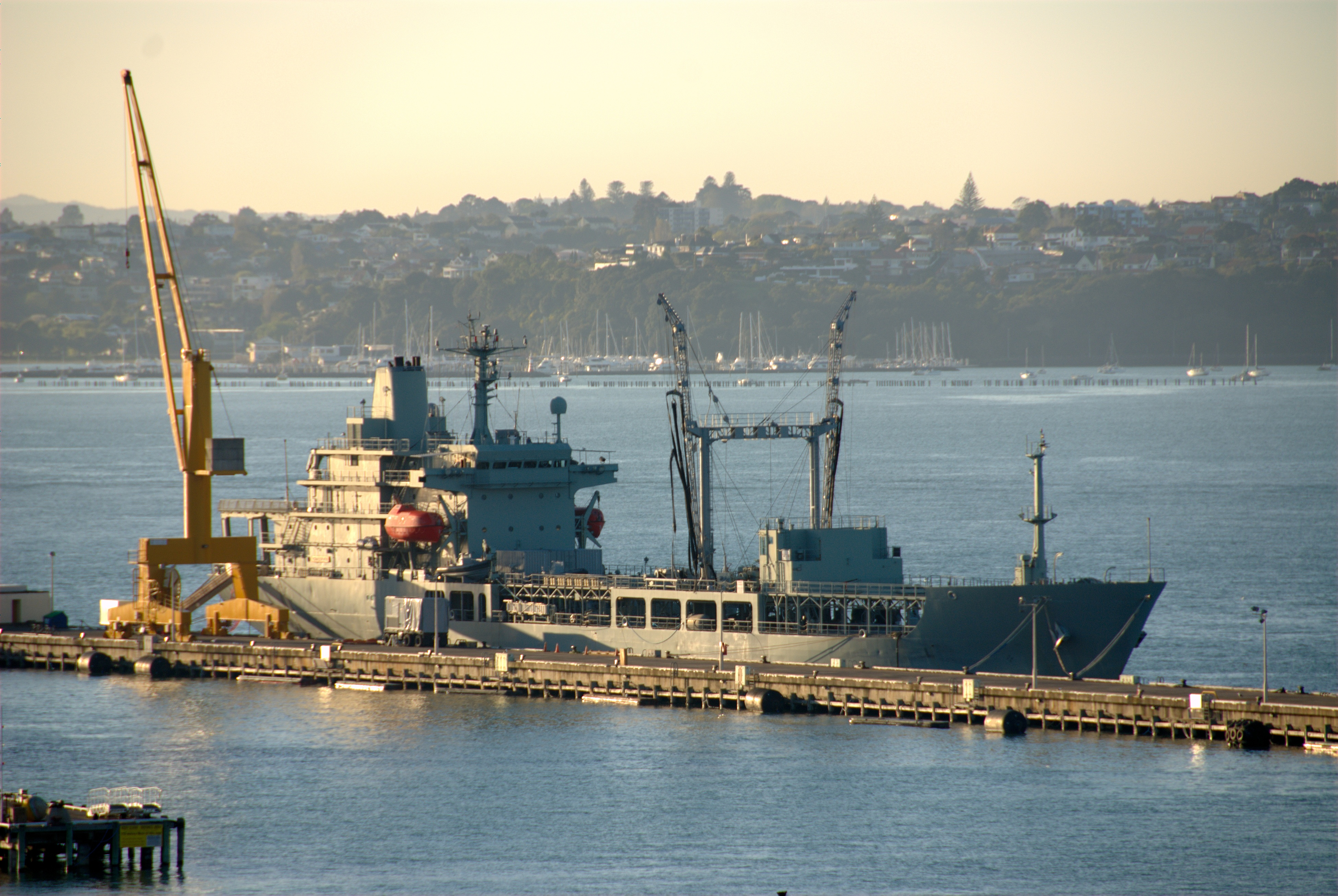
Endeavour berthed at Devonport Naval Base in 2007

Tender requirements for the replacement replenishment vessel included a propulsion system built around two diesel engines to provide a range of 6,400 nautical miles (11,900 km; 7,400 mi) at 16 knots (30 km/h; 18 mph), armament equivalent to two Mini Typhoon mounts and a Phalanx CIWS, facilities to operate a helicopter, and a container deck capacity of at least 12 TEU shipping containers. In September 2015, Daewoo Shipbuilding & Marine Engineering and Hyundai Heavy Industries were shortlisted for the final phase of the tender.

On 18 July 2016 the Minister of Defence announced that Hyundai Heavy Industries will construct Endeavour's replacement, at a cost of NZ$493,000,000, with an estimated in service date of 2020. The new vessel will have enhanced capabilities in Antarctica, the ability to carry and refuel helicopters, as well as replenish with both fuel and fresh water. It will feature a LEADGE bow as part of the "Enviroship" design. Rolls-Royce is supplying the propulsion that includes a Combined Diesel Electric and Diesel (CODLAD) propulsion plant based on twin Bergen main engines. These will each drive, via reduction gears, a controllable pitch propeller. Electrical power will be from four MTU generator sets.

On 10 April 2017 it was announced Endeavour's replacement would be named HMNZS Aotearoa.

== See also ==
- Logistics ships of the Royal New Zealand Navy
