= George Brown & Co =

George Brown & Co. Limited (George Brown & Co. (Marine) Limited from 1937) was a ship building and repair company which operated from the Garvel Park Shipyard, Greenock, Scotland. It was incorporated in 1901 by its eponymous founder, formerly general manager of Denny's Shipyard in Dumbarton. The first ship built by the company was the Princess Beara, built for the Bantry Bay Steamship Company and launched 24 June 1901, and the last was Wilton, a buoy tender for the Tees & Hartlepool Port Authority which was launched on 17 December 1982.

The company was liquidated in 1983 as a result of its failure to secure new orders and its assets auctioned on 24 February 1983.
