= USS Namakagon =

Patapsco-class gasoline tanker

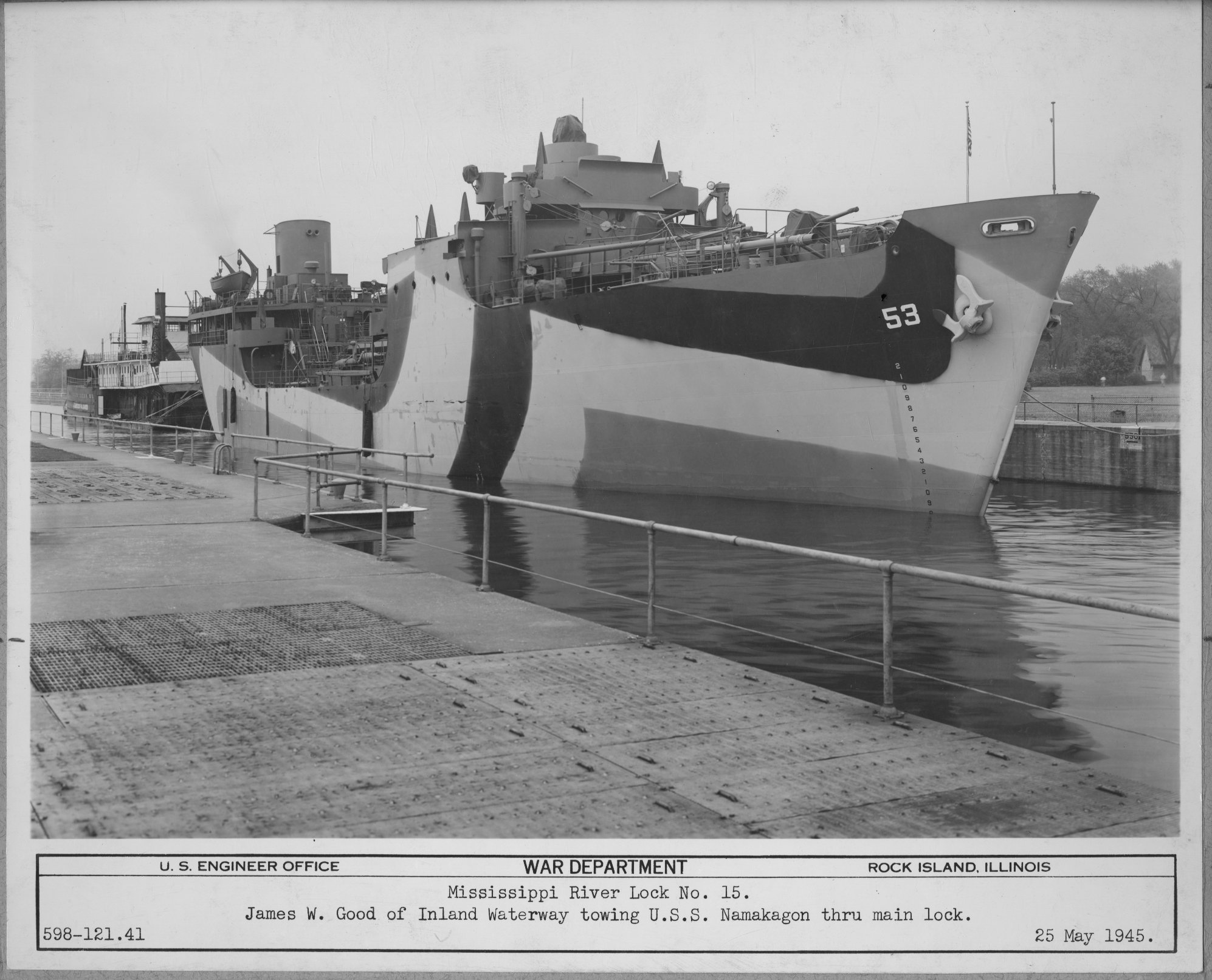

History

United States
- Name: USS Namakagon
- Namesake: Namakagon River in Wisconsin
- Ordered: as T1-MT-M1 tanker hull
- Builder: Cargill, Inc., Savage, Minnesota
- Laid down: 1 August 1944
- Launched: 4 November 1944
- Commissioned: 15 June 1945
- Decommissioned: 20 September 1957
- Identification: AOG-53
- Fate: transferred to New Zealand, 1962
- Acquired: returned from New Zealand, 1971
- Fate: transferred to the Republic of China, 1971
- Stricken: 15 April 1976

New Zealand
- Name: HMNZS Endeavour
- Acquired: 1962
- Commissioned: 1962
- Decommissioned: 1971
- Identification: A184
- Fate: returned to U.S. custody, 1971

Taiwan
- Name: ROCS Lung Chuan (AOG-515)
- Acquired: 1971
- Decommissioned: 1 April 2005, Kaohsiung
- Identification: AOG-515; AOG-507

General characteristics
- Class & type: Patapsco-class gasoline tanker
- Tonnage: 2,120 long tons deadweight (DWT)
- Displacement: 1,846 long tons (1,876 t) light; 4,130 long tons (4,196 t) full load
- Length: 310 ft 9 in (94.72 m)
- Beam: 48 ft 6 in (14.78 m)
- Draft: 15 ft 8 in (4.78 m)
- Propulsion: 4 × General Electric diesel engines, electric drive, twin shafts, 3,300 hp (2,461 kW)
- Speed: 14 knots (26 km/h; 16 mph)
- Complement: 131
- Armament: 4 × 3"/50 caliber guns; 12 × 20 mm AA guns

USS Namakagon (AOG-53) was a Patapsco-class gasoline tanker built for the United States Navy during World War II. In some sources, the ship's name is also spelled Namakogon. After her decommissioning from the U.S. Navy in 1957, the former Namakagon served as Antarctic supply vessel HMNZS Endeavour (A184) for the Royal New Zealand Navy (1962–1971), and as ROCS Lung Chuan for the Republic of China Navy. Lung Chuan ended active service when she was decommissioned from the Republic of China Navy in 2005.

== Service history ==
=== United States Navy career ===
Namakagon was laid down on 1 August 1944 by Cargill, Inc., Savage, Minnesota and was launched on 4 November 1944; sponsored by Mrs. Alfred J. Scobba. The ship was commissioned on 18 June 1945.

The gasoline tanker Namakagon completed her U.S. Gulf Coast shakedown and, having filled her tanks at Baytown, Texas, departed for the Pacific Ocean, 19 July 1945. She arrived at Pearl Harbor as hostilities in the Pacific ceased and on 20 August continued on to Midway Island. Based at Pearl Harbor, she carried fuel to various islands of the Pacific, including Johnston Island, Canton Island, Marcus Island, Truk, Guam, Saipan, Okinawa, Peleliu, and Kyūshū, for over 18 months, then returned to the West Coast of the United States.

In early June 1947, she completed overhaul at San Pedro, California, and on the 9th steamed north to her new homeport, Kodiak, Alaska. From there and from ports in Washington, she carried passengers and mixed cargo as she operated a gasoline provisioning shuttle to naval bases and stations on the coast and in the Aleutians. Detached from Kodiak in 1953, she returned to Pearl Harbor, whence she operated until June 1957. She then sailed to Mare Island, California, where she decommissioned on 20 September 1957, and entered the Pacific Reserve Fleet.

=== Royal New Zealand Navy career ===
On 27 June 1962, custody of Namakagon was transferred to the Commandant, 12th Naval District for activation, following which she was transferred, under the Military Aid Program, to the Royal New Zealand Navy, on 5 October 1962. Commissioned as HMNZS Endeavour (A184), an Antarctic supply ship, she delivered fuel to research bases on the seventh continent, bringing over 1 million gallons each year to McMurdo Sound alone, since 1963.

Endeavour was decommissioned and returned to U.S. custody in 1971.

=== Republic of China Navy career ===
The former Namakagon was leased to the Republic of China Navy in 1971 and renamed ROCS Lung Chuan (AOG-515). Her pennant number was later changed to AOG-507. Although Lung Chuan remained in the custody of the Republic of China Navy, the vessel was returned to the U.S. on paper in 1976, struck from the American Naval Vessel Register on 15 April, and sold back to the Republic of China. Lung Chuan was decommissioned on 1 April 2005 at Kaohsiung, Taiwan. Her final disposition is unknown.

== Military awards and honors ==
Namakagon's crew was eligible for the following medals:

- American Campaign Medal
- Asiatic–Pacific Campaign Medal
- World War II Victory Medal
- Navy Occupation Service Medal (with Asia Clasp)
- National Defense Service Medal

== See also ==
- Logistic ships of the Royal New Zealand Navy
