= HMAS Kiama =

Ship of the New Zealand Navy

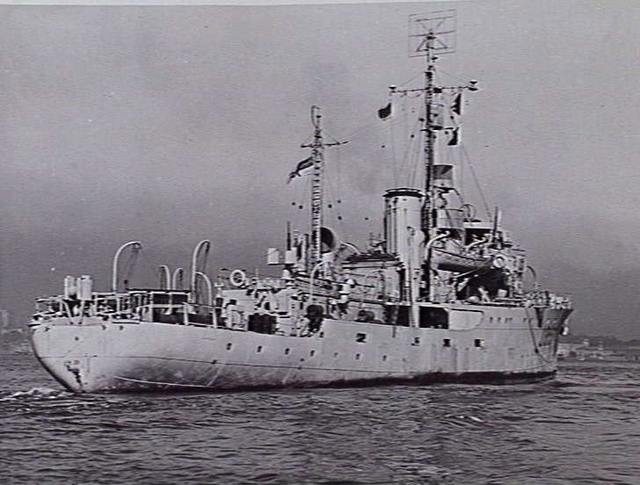
- HMAS Kiama in 1944

History

Australia
- Name: HMAS Kiama
- Namesake: Town of Kiama, New South Wales
- Builder: Evans Deakin & Co
- Laid down: 2 November 1942
- Launched: 3 July 1943
- Commissioned: 26 January 1944
- Decommissioned: 3 April 1946
- Identification: Pennant number: J353
- Honours and awards: Battle honours: Pacific 1944–45; New Guinea 1944
- Fate: Transferred to RNZN
- Badge

New Zealand
- Acquired: 5 March 1952
- Decommissioned: 19 August 1976
- Renamed: HMNZS Kiama
- Reclassified: Training ship
- Identification: Pennant number: M353
- Fate: Paid off for disposal

General characteristics
- Class & type: Bathurst-class corvette
- Displacement: As built: 650 tons standard; 1,025 tons (full war load); RNZN service: 790 tons
- Length: 186 ft (57 m)
- Beam: 31 ft (9.4 m)
- Draught: 8.5 ft (2.6 m)
- Installed power: 2,000 hp (1,500 kW)
- Propulsion: Triple-expansion steam engine; 2 shafts
- Speed: 15 knots (28 km/h; 17 mph)
- Complement: As built: 85; RNZN service: 65
- Armament: As built: 1 × 4 inch Mk XIX HA gun; RNZN service: 2 × Bofors 40 mm guns

HMAS Kiama, named for the coastal town of Kiama, New South Wales, was one of 60 Bathurst-class corvettes constructed during World War II, and one of 36 initially manned and commissioned solely by the Royal Australian Navy (RAN).

After World War II, the corvette was one of four sold to the Royal New Zealand Navy (RNZN). She served as HMNZS Kiama from 1952 until 1976, when the corvette was paid off and marked for disposal.

== Design and construction ==
In 1938, the Australian Commonwealth Naval Board (ACNB) identified the need for a general purpose 'local defence vessel' capable of both anti-submarine and mine-warfare duties, while easy to construct and operate. The vessel was initially envisaged as having a displacement of approximately 500 tons, a speed of at least 10 knots (19 km/h; 12 mph), and a range of 2,000 nautical miles (3,700 km; 2,300 mi) The opportunity to build a prototype in the place of a cancelled Bar-class boom defence vessel saw the proposed design increased to a 680-ton vessel, with a 15.5 knots (28.7 km/h; 17.8 mph) top speed, and a range of 2,850 nautical miles (5,280 km; 3,280 mi), armed with a 4-inch gun, equipped with asdic, and able to fitted with either depth charges or minesweeping equipment depending on the planned operations: although closer in size to a sloop than a local defence vessel, the resulting increased capabilities were accepted due to advantages over British-designed mine warfare and anti-submarine vessels. Construction of the prototype HMAS Kangaroo did not go ahead, but the plans were retained. The need for locally built 'all-rounder' vessels at the start of World War II saw the "Australian Minesweepers" (designated as such to hide their anti-submarine capability, but popularly referred to as "corvettes") approved in September 1939, with 60 constructed during the course of the war: 36 (including Kiama) ordered by the RAN, 20 ordered by the British Admiralty but manned and commissioned as RAN vessels, and 4 for the Royal Indian Navy.

Kiama was constructed by Evans Deakin & Co, at Brisbane, Queensland. She was laid down on 2 November 1942, and launched on 3 July 1943 by Mrs. G. Lawson, wife of the Minister for Transport. Kiama was commissioned into the RAN on 26 January 1944. The coastal community of Kiama, after which the vessel was named, donated recreational materiel for her crew including a radio set, books, and a 16 mm movie projector.

== Operational history ==
=== World War II ===
Kiama's first deployment was in March 1944 to Milne Bay in New Guinea. From her arrival until September 1944, the corvette's main duty was to escort convoys along the New Guinea coastline, although a reassignment for the duration of June saw Kiama perform anti-submarine patrols in the Solomon Sea. In September, Kiama was used to transport soldiers between New Guinea and New Britain. On conclusion, she resumed her convoy escort role until the end of 1944, when she departed for Sydney. During her eight months in New Guinea waters, Kiama travelled over 30,000 nautical miles (56,000 km), was at sea for more than 3,000 hours.

In September 1944 'C' Troop and a small detachment from 'B' Troop, from the 2/8th Commando Squadron were landed from HMAS Kiama on a reconnaissance operation at Jacquinot Bay on the island of New Britain, to collect intelligence in preparation for an assault by the 5th Division.

The corvette arrived in Sydney on 21 December 1944. On 25 December, the crew was recalled from leave to go to the assistance of the liberty ship SS Robert J. Walker, which had been torpedoed by German submarine U-862. Kiama, along with Quickmatch, Yandra, and USS PC597 were dispatched to the last known location of the ship and began to search the area for the liberty ship's crew and the attacking submarine; finding the 67 survivors of the attack at 05:45 on 26 December but failing to locate U-862. Kiama was assigned to anti-submarine patrols near Sydney for the final days of the year, before sailing to Adelaide for a month-long refit on 3 January 1945.

Post-refit, Kiama was assigned to Fremantle for two months of anti-submarine warfare exercises with the United States Navy, before returning to New Guinea on 7 May 1945. In May and June, the corvette performed several coastal bombardments in the Bougainville area. In July, Kiama transported Prince Henry, Duke of Gloucester from New Guinea to the Solomon Islands, then spent the rest of the month moving troops and military cargo between these two locations. From 5 to 24 August, the corvette was based in Brisbane, before returning to New Guinea waters. Kiama spent the rest of 1945 as a troop and supply transport, minesweeper, and general duties vessel. When the war ended, Kiama took part in the Japanese surrender at Rabaul. In November, Kiama was assigned to escort demilitarized Japanese cruiser Kashima as the cruiser embarked Japanese soldiers in New Guinea for repatriation.

Kiama returned to Sydney on 29 January 1946. In February she paid a six-day farewell visit to the town of Kiama, ahead of her decommission into the Reserve on 3 April. During her wartime service, the ship had been at sea for 6,369 hours, and had sailed a distance of 60,822 nautical miles (112,642 km). She earned two battle honours: "Pacific 1944–45" and "New Guinea 1944".

=== Transfer to RNZN ===
On 5 March 1952, Kiama and three other Bathurst-class corvettes (Echuca, Inverell, and Stawell) were transferred to the Royal New Zealand Navy. Kiama was commissioned into the RNZN, receiving the prefix HMNZS. Upon acquisition by New Zealand, the corvette was converted into a training ship. Kiama's 4-inch gun and aft minesweeping equipment were removed, and replaced with two 40 mm Bofors anti-aircraft guns. This is contradicted by a 1996 newspaper article which said it had been mothballed by the New Zealand Navy and converted to a training ship and for use on fisheries patrols in 1966.

In 1966, Kiama was re-commissioned under command of Lieutenant-Commander E Burrows in the 27th Fisheries Protection Squadron to join her sister ship HMNZS Inverell. Other duties included search-and-rescue operations and transportation of scientific teams to small island along New Zealand's coastline.

In May 1966 the Kiama was involved in the search for the Kaitawa which was lost with all hands near 90 mile beach. Apart from the initial search, the Kiama formed part of Operation Seabed, along with the Inverell and the frigate Taranaki.

The corvette revisited her namesake town in Australia in late 1966.

=== RNZN Commanders ===
- 1966 Lt Commander E Burrows
- 1967 Lt-commander M C Verran
- 1968 Lt-Commander L J Tempero
- 1970 Lt-Commander F D Arnott
- 1971 Lt-Commander D L Douglas
- 1973 Lt Commander N Cameron

== Fate ==
On 27 May 1968 the Chief of Naval Staff, Rear Admiral J O Ross, described the Kiama and Inverell as obsolete and no longer fit for purpose. The Kiama remained in service until 1975 when it was placed in reserve. The ship was paid off for disposal on 19 August 1976 and broken up in 1979.
