= Ocean Recovery =

New Zealand naval ship (1988–2018)

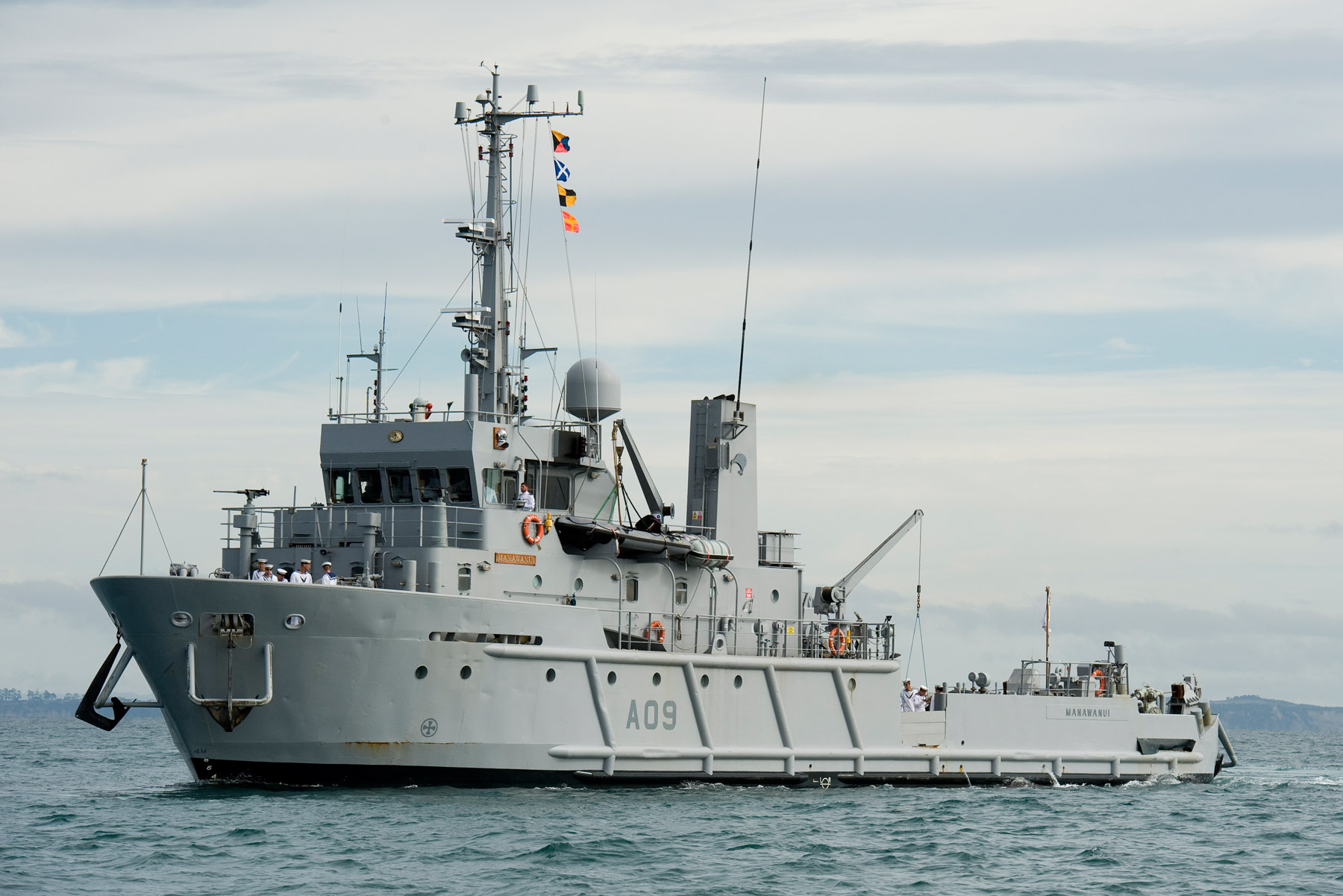
- HMNZS Manawanui in 2010

History

United Kingdom
- Name: MV Star Perseus
- Owner: Star Offshore Services PLC
- Ordered: 1 December 1977
- Builder: Cochrane Shipbuilders Limited, Selby
- Launched: 1979
- Out of service: 1987
- Identification: IMO number: 7803322

History

New Zealand
- Name: HMNZS Manawanui
- Commissioned: 5 April 1988
- Decommissioned: 23 February 2018
- Home port: Whitianga
- Identification: MMSI number: 512000300; Callsign: ZMLR

History

Cook Islands
- Name: MV Recovery
- Owner: Major Projects Foundation
- Acquired: 2 July 2018
- Identification: MMSI number: 518100621; Callsign: E5U3535

History

Panama
- Name: RV Ocean Recovery
- Owner: Major Projects Foundation
- In service: September 2019
- Identification: MMSI number: 352004363; Callsign: HOA3670
- Status: Laid up

General characteristics
- Displacement: 911 tonnes standard
- Length: 43 m (141 ft)
- Beam: 9.5 m (31 ft)
- Draught: 3.2 m (10 ft)
- Propulsion: Two 565 hp Caterpillar marine diesels with twin shafts.; Bow thrusters; Diesel with controllable-pitch propeller
- Speed: 11 knots (20 km/h)
- Range: 5,000 nmi (9,300 km; 5,800 mi)
- Complement: 24 officers and ratings
- Armament: 2x 12.7mm machine guns

Ocean Recovery, previously HMNZS Manawanui (A09) was commissioned in 1988 as a diving support vessel for the Royal New Zealand Navy. Originally she was built as a diving support vessel, the Star Perseus, for North Sea oil rig operations.

Manawanui is the third ship with this name to serve in the New Zealand Navy. Manawanui is a Māori word meaning "to be brave or steadfast".

Manawanui has a capability to hold station over a fixed position. She has a triple lock recompression chamber, a crane with 13 tonne lifting capacity, wet diving bell and a small engineering workshop. She also has limited deck cargo carrying capacity.

The divers of the New Zealand Navy who work onboard Manawanui are trained for deep diving with mixed gases, underwater demolition and unexploded ordnance disposal.

An ROV operated from the Manawanui returned photos of the wreck of the MV Princess Ashika, which sank near Ha'apai, Tonga on 5 August 2009.

The vessel was decommissioned at Devonport Naval Base on February 23, 2018.

In July 2018 the ship was sold to the Major Projects Group, an Australian demotions company, and has been renamed as the MV Ocean Recovery. The ship will be used by the Major Projects Foundation (which was founded by the company) as a research and education vessel, with a focus on investigating and preventing oil spills from sunken ships in the Pacific.

The new owners, Paul and Wilma Adams, plan to base the ship at Carrington, part of the Port of Newcastle, New South Wales, Australia. They plan for the ship to be the diving base for work in Chuuk Lagoon.

== See also ==
- Diving tenders of the Royal New Zealand Navy
