= SS Duchess =

New Zealand ferry

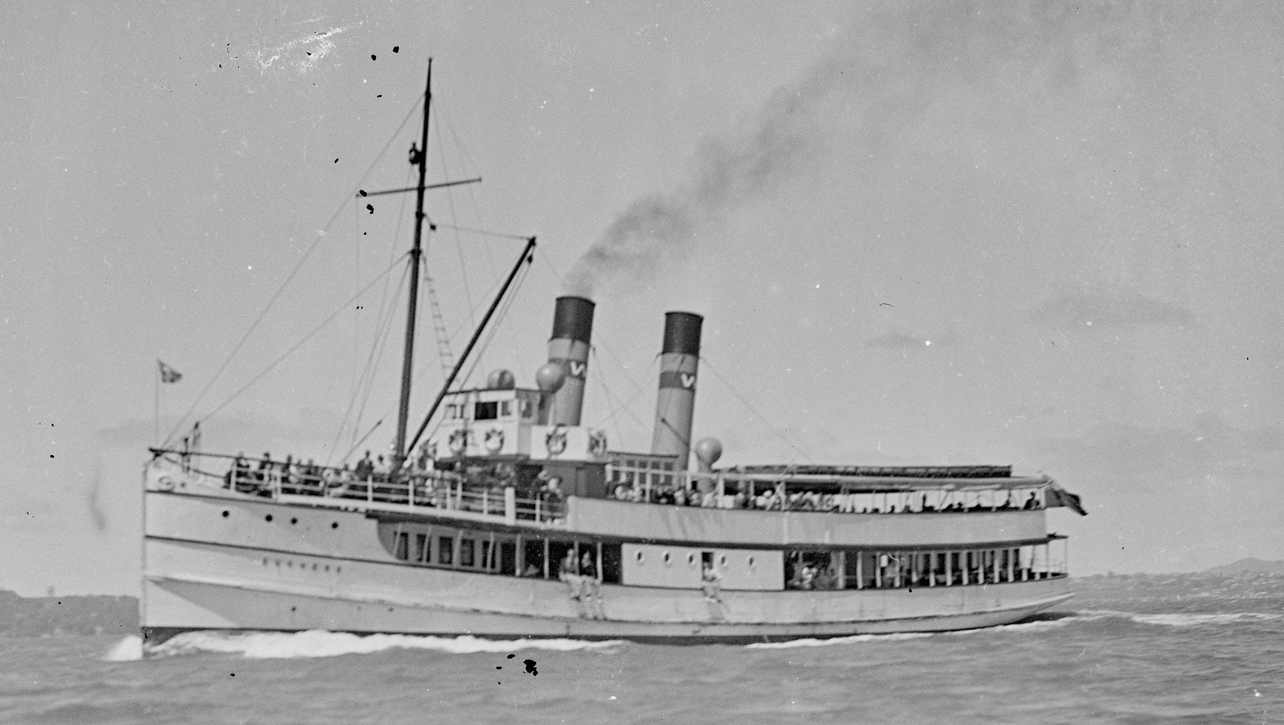
- SS Duchess on the Waitemata Harbour

History

New Zealand
- Name: Duchess
- Builder: Mackie & Thomson, Govan
- Yard number: 146
- Launched: 22 April, 1897
- Commissioned: 1940
- Decommissioned: 1946
- In service: Late 1897
- Out of service: 1940
- Renamed: Duchess II (1934) "Duchess" (1934)
- Identification: Pennant number: T07
- Fate: Hulked and abandoned 1947

General characteristics
- Length: 40.72 m (133.6 ft)
- Beam: 7.9 m (26 ft)
- Depth: 3.66 m (12.0 ft)
- Propulsion: Single screw, triple reciprocating engine

SS Duchess was a New Zealand ferry that originally operated as an Eastbourne-Wellington ferry, until being sold in 1930 for use as a Auckland-Kawau ferry. In her final years she was operated by the Royal New Zealand Navy.

== Construction ==
Duchess was built by Mackie & Thomson, based at Govan for J.H. Williams of Wellington, and was launched on 22 April 1897. After completion and a lengthy voyage from Govan, she arrived in New Zealand on October 1897.

== Service as a Wellington-Eastbourne ferry ==
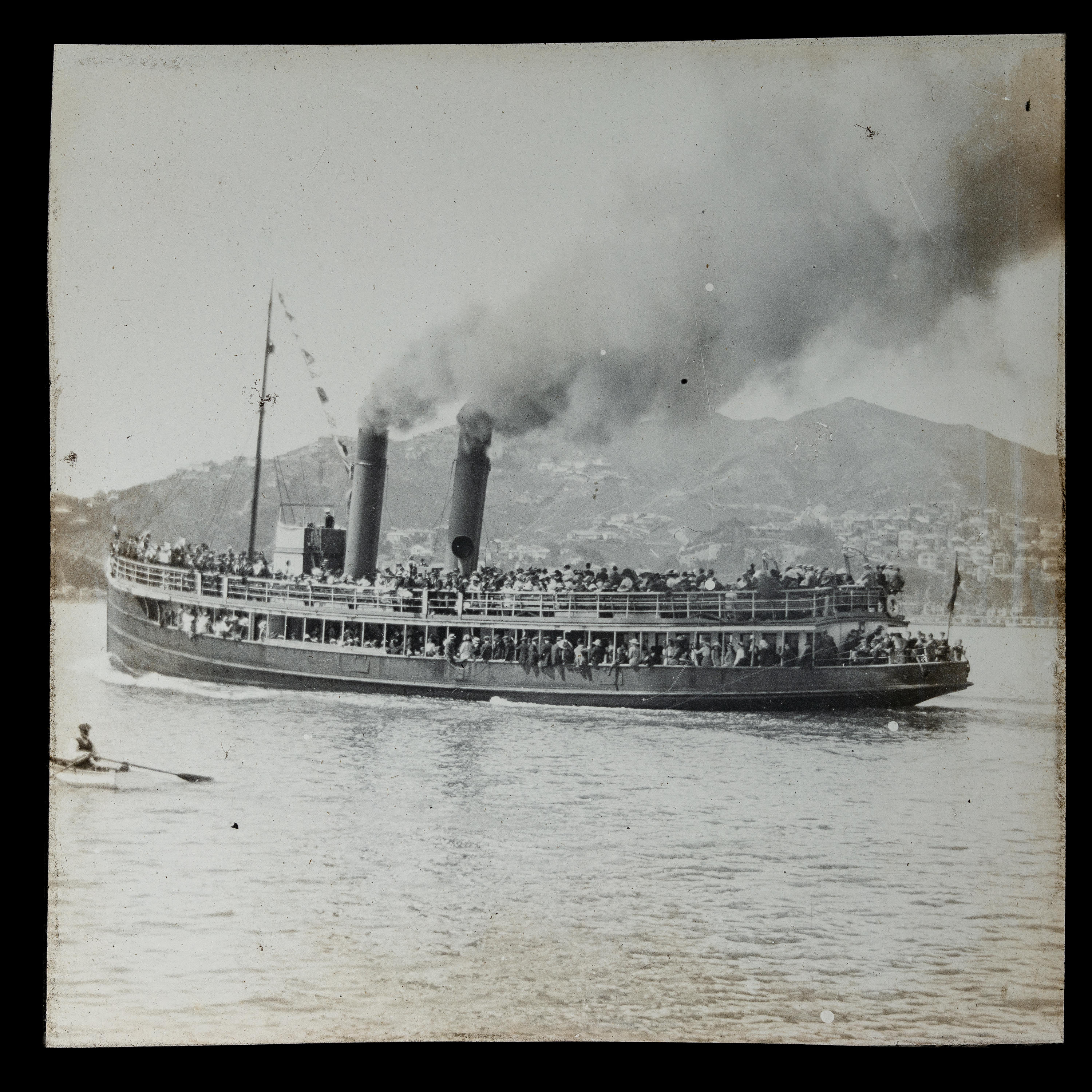
Duchess in service as a Wellington-Eastbourne ferry

Duchess entered service on 30 October 1897 and made her first trip to Eastbourne at 10 AM that morning. She was a running mate to Duco until she was withdrawn from service in 1909 and converted into a fishing vessel. On 17 January 1916, a serious incident occurred when Deckhand William Bryce attempted to carry a line thrown from the ship to the wharf. While trying to do this he slipped and was crushed between the wharf and Duchess. The man was taken to a hospital shortly after. A similar incident occurred nearly 10 years later on 13 July 1926 when Morris Lambert, a passenger, was crushed between Duchess and the wharf. The injuries he sustained resulted in his death before he could be taken to a hospital.

On 9 June 1927, a collision occurred between Duchess and the scow Kohi, with no serious damage to Duchess.

In 1929, Duchess taken out of service and laid up.

== Service in Auckland ==
In November 1930, Duchess was sold to J.A Macdonald of Auckland to provide summer excursions from Auckland to Kawau island, arriving in Auckland on 13 December 1930. Duchess was then sold in 1931 to Watkin & Wallis, who then created the Duchess Steamship Company, with Watkin & Wallis being a major shareholder, putting her on the Matiatia-Kawau Island service every summer.

== World War 2 ==
Duchess was sold on June 24 1940 to the Royal New Zealand Navy after the sinking of RMS Niagara, and was converted into a minesweeper, but she had many defects and was only suitable for sheltered waters. She was used as an Auckland port minesweeper in limited capacity until April 1941, when she was reduced to a Care and Maintenance vessel, and was moored alongside the hulk Ngapuhi. In November 1941, conversion into an Examination vessel started, and she was commissioned once again for this role on 17 March 1942, and she served in this role until 10 September 1944, when the service was withdrawn, with Duchess again being reduced to a Care and Maintenance vessel. She was recommissioned once again to relieve Onewa on the Tamaki liberty and stores run in February 1945. Duchess was finally paid off on August 28 1946, and put up for sale & laid up at Pine Island.

== Fate ==
Duchess was considered for use as an Auckland-Waiheke ferry by the Devonport Steam Ferry Co. but she was found to be worn out, and was sold to F. Appleton of Penrose in December 1946, and towed to the Western Viaduct in January 1947. Her hull was stripped, and on 11 June 1947, she was towed to Rangitoto island and beached at Boulder Bay.
