= HMAS Stawell =

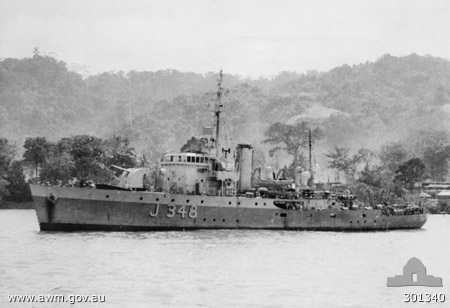
- HMAS Stawell during 1944

History

Australia
- Namesake: Town of Stawell, Victoria
- Builder: HMA Naval Dockyard at Williamstown, Victoria
- Laid down: 18 June 1942
- Launched: 3 April 1943
- Commissioned: 7 August 1943
- Decommissioned: 26 March 1946
- Motto: "Without Fear or Favour"
- Honours and awards: Battle honours: Pacific 1943–45; New Guinea 1943–44; Borneo 1945
- Fate: gifted to RNZN
- Badge

New Zealand
- Acquired: 5 March 1952
- Decommissioned: Late 1950s
- Fate: Sold for scrap in 1968

General characteristics during RAN service
- Class & type: Bathurst-class corvette
- Displacement: 650 tons standard; 1,025 tons full war load
- Length: 186 ft (57 m)
- Beam: 31 ft (9.4 m)
- Draught: 8.5 ft (2.6 m)
- Propulsion: triple expansion engine, 2 shafts, 2,000 hp (1,500 kW)
- Speed: 15 knots (28 km/h; 17 mph) at 1,750 hp
- Complement: 85
- Armament: 1 × 4 inch Mk XIX gun; 3 × Oerlikon 20 mm cannons; Machine guns; Depth charges chutes and throwers

HMAS Stawell (J348/M348) was a Bathurst-class corvette named after the town of Stawell, Victoria. Sixty Bathurst-class corvettes were constructed during World War II, and Stawell was one of 36 initially manned and commissioned solely by the Royal Australian Navy (RAN).

The corvette later served in the Royal New Zealand Navy (RNZN) as HMNZS Stawell.

== Design and construction ==
In 1938, the Australian Commonwealth Naval Board (ACNB) identified the need for a general purpose 'local defence vessel' capable of both anti-submarine and mine-warfare duties, while easy to construct and operate. The vessel was initially envisaged as having a displacement of approximately 500 tons, a speed of at least 10 knots (19 km/h; 12 mph), and a range of 2,000 nautical miles (3,700 km; 2,300 mi) The opportunity to build a prototype in the place of a cancelled Bar-class boom defence vessel saw the proposed design increased to a 680-ton vessel, with a 15.5 knots (28.7 km/h; 17.8 mph) top speed, and a range of 2,850 nautical miles (5,280 km; 3,280 mi), armed with a 4-inch (102 mm) gun, equipped with asdic, and able to fitted with either depth charges or minesweeping equipment depending on the planned operations: although closer in size to a sloop than a local defence vessel, the resulting increased capabilities were accepted due to advantages over British-designed mine warfare and anti-submarine vessels. Construction of the prototype HMAS Kangaroo did not go ahead, but the plans were retained. The need for locally built 'all-rounder' vessels at the start of World War II saw the "Australian Minesweepers" (designated as such to hide their anti-submarine capability, but popularly referred to as "corvettes") approved in September 1939, with 60 constructed during the course of the war: 36 (including Stawell) ordered by the RAN, 20 ordered by the British Admiralty but manned and commissioned as RAN vessels, and 4 for the Royal Indian Navy.

Stawell was laid down by HMA Naval Dockyard at Williamstown, Victoria on 18 June 1942. She was launched on 3 April 1943 by Mrs. J. J. Dedman, wife of the Minister for War Organisation, and commissioned into the RAN on 7 August 1943.

== Operational history ==
=== RAN ===
The majority of Stawell's career was spent in three areas. Initially, she served as a convoy escort along the east coast of Australia. Following this, Stawell participated in a variety of escort, minesweeping, and combat roles throughout New Guinea waters. On 3 August 1945 she sank an armed Daihatsu barge in the Moluccas area. In the final third of her career, the ship spent time in Hong Kong waters, performing minsweeping and anti-piracy duties. Stawell returned to Brisbane in November 1945.

The corvette received three battle honours for her wartime service: "Pacific 1943–45", "New Guinea 1943–44", and "Borneo 1945".

=== RNZN ===
Stawell was removed from RAN service on 26 March 1946. On 5 March 1952, Stawell and three other Bathurst-class corvettes (HMA Ships Echuca, Inverell, and Kiama) were transferred to the Royal New Zealand Navy.

She was commissioned into the RNZN during May 1952 and given the prefix HMNZS. Stawell operated primarily as a training vessel until 1959, when she was placed into reserve.

== Fate ==
Stawell was sold to Pacific Scrap Limited of Auckland, New Zealand, in July 1968, and was broken up for scrap.
