= HMAS Inverell =

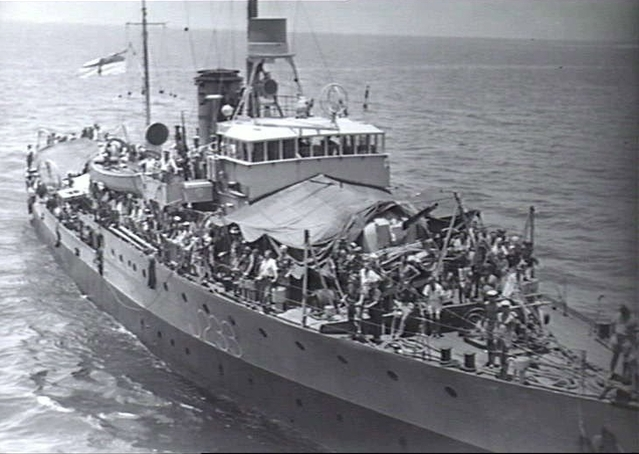
- HMAS Inverell transferring liberated prisoners of war to HMAS Maidstone off Makassar, Dutch East Indies in September 1945

History

Australia
- Namesake: Town of Inverell, New South Wales
- Builder: Mort's Dock & Engineering Co
- Laid down: 7 December 1941
- Launched: 2 May 1942
- Commissioned: 17 September 1942
- Decommissioned: 14 June 1946
- Identification: Pennant number: J233 or M233
- Fate: Transferred to RNZN
- Badge

New Zealand
- Acquired: 5 March 1952
- Commissioned: 10 April 1952
- Decommissioned: 1952
- Recommissioned: 15 August 1965
- Decommissioned: 19 August 1976
- Reclassified: Training and fisheries protection vessel
- Honours and awards: Battle honours: Darwin 1942; Pacific 1942–45
- Fate: Sold for scrap on 1 November 1977

General characteristics in RAN service
- Class & type: Bathurst-class corvette
- Displacement: 650 tons standard; 1,025 tons full load
- Length: 186 ft (57 m)
- Beam: 31 ft (9.4 m)
- Draught: 8.5 ft (2.6 m)
- Propulsion: triple expansion engine, 2 shafts, 2,000 ihp (1,500 kW)
- Speed: 15 knots (28 km/h; 17 mph) at 1,750 hp
- Complement: 85
- Armament: 1 × 4 inch Mk XIX gun; 3 × Oerlikon 20 mm cannons (later reduced to 2); 1 × 40 mm gun (installed later); Machine guns; Depth charges chutes and throwers

HMAS Inverell, named for the town of Inverell, New South Wales, was one of 60 Bathurst-class corvettes constructed during World War II, and one of 36 initially manned and commissioned solely by the Royal Australian Navy (RAN).

After World War II, the corvette was transferred to the Royal New Zealand Navy (RNZN), where she served from 1952 to 1976.

== Design and construction ==
In 1938, the Australian Commonwealth Naval Board (ACNB) identified the need for a general purpose 'local defence vessel' capable of both anti-submarine and mine-warfare duties, while easy to construct and operate. The vessel was initially envisaged as having a displacement of approximately 500 tons, a speed of at least 10 knots (19 km/h; 12 mph), and a range of 2,000 nautical miles (3,700 km; 2,300 mi) The opportunity to build a prototype in the place of a cancelled Bar-class boom defence vessel saw the proposed design increased to a 680-ton vessel, with a 15.5 knots (28.7 km/h; 17.8 mph) top speed, and a range of 2,850 nautical miles (5,280 km; 3,280 mi), armed with a 4-inch gun, equipped with asdic, and able to fitted with either depth charges or minesweeping equipment depending on the planned operations: although closer in size to a sloop than a local defence vessel, the resulting increased capabilities were accepted due to advantages over British-designed mine warfare and anti-submarine vessels. Construction of the prototype HMAS Kangaroo did not go ahead, but the plans were retained. The need for locally built 'all-rounder' vessels at the start of World War II saw the "Australian Minesweepers" (designated as such to hide their anti-submarine capability, but popularly referred to as "corvettes") approved in September 1939, with 60 constructed during the course of the war: 36 (including Inverell) ordered by the RAN, 20 ordered by the British Admiralty but manned and commissioned as RAN vessels, and 4 for the Royal Indian Navy.

Inverell was laid down by Mort's Dock & Engineering Co at Balmain, New South Wales on 7 December 1941. She was launched on 2 May 1942 by Mrs. T. S. Punch, Mayoress of Inverell, and commissioned into the RAN on 17 September 1942.

== Operational history ==
=== World War II ===
Inverell began service in November 1942 as a convoy escort along the eastern Australian coast. At the end of December, she was relocated to Darwin, and primarily performed escort runs between Darwin and Thursday Island. On 11 November 1943, Inverell arrived at Williamstown Naval Dockyard for a month-long refit. On conclusion, she returned to Darwin and resumed escort duties.

In early February 1943, Inverell was required to rescue the crew of a United States Army Air Forces Liberator bomber, which had crashed on Croker Island. Of the eight survivors, one died onboard while the corvette was returning to Darwin. On 22 September 1944, Inverell sailed to Fremantle.

While based in Fremantle, the corvette's main duties was to perform training exercises with United States Navy and Royal Navy submarines, with secondary duties including convoy escort and patrol. Inverell departed Fremantle for Darwin on 4 May 1945. Between 22 May and 11 July, the corvette was involve in minesweeping, before she, sister ship HMAS Stawell, and Services Reconnaissance Department vessel HMAS River Snake were assigned to Morotai. Inverell was required to tow River Snake for the first part of the voyage.

Based in Morotai, Inverell was primarily used as a patrol vessel until the end of World War II, when she became involved in the transfer of Dutch East Indies territories from Japanese to Allied control. From 21 September to 18 November, she was designated as the command ship for Port Directorate Macassar. On 29 November, she left Morotai, and spent the next month operating off the coast of Queensland before arriving in Brisbane on 25 December 1945 and preparing for decommissioning. Several delays meant that Inverell was not paid off into reserve until 14 June 1946. On 4 November 1946, Inverell was towed to Sydney by sister ship HMAS Echuca, arriving on 17 November.

The corvette received two battle honours for her wartime service: "Darwin 1942" and Pacific 1942–45".

=== RNZN service ===
On 5 March 1952, Inverell and three other Bathurst-class corvettes (HMA Ships Echuca, Kiama, and Stawell) were transferred to the Royal New Zealand Navy. Inverell was commissioned into the RNZN on 10 April 1952, but was decommissioned into reserve after a refit.

In 1965, the corvette was refitted as a training and fisheries patrol ship to replace the frigate HMNZS Rotoiti. The 4-inch gun was replaced by a second 40 mm Bofors gun, and minesweeping gear was removed. She was recommissioned on 15 August 1965, and served until 19 August 1976, when she was decommissioned.

On 1 November 1977, Inverell was sold to Pacific Scrap Limited of Auckland for scrapping.
