= List of active Royal New Zealand Navy ships =

This is a list of current commissioned Royal New Zealand Navy ships. As of 2026, the Navy operates eight commissioned ships. The affiliations are ceremonial only, with the Navy operationally stationed at the Devonport Naval Base, Auckland.

Class	Origin (builder)	Image	Type	Ship	No.	Comm.	Disp.	Homeport	Affiliation	Notes
Naval Combat Force (2)
Anzac class Sub-class of MEKO-200	Germany (Blohm+Voss design); Australia (Tenix Defence Williamstown shipyard)		General purpose frigate	HMNZS Te Kaha	F77	1997	3,660 tonnes	Devonport	Napier	Active as of 2026.
Anzac class Sub-class of MEKO-200	Germany (Blohm+Voss design); Australia (Tenix Defence Williamstown shipyard)		General purpose frigate	HMNZS Te Mana	F111	1999	3,660 tonnes	Devonport	Tauranga	Active as of 2026.
Naval Patrol Force (2)
Protector class	Australia (Tenix Defence Williamstown shipyard)		Offshore patrol vessel	HMNZS Otago	P148	2010	1,900 tonnes	Devonport	Dunedin	Temporary laid-up( 2022-2026).
Lake class	New Zealand (Tenix Defence Whangārei shipyard)		Inshore patrol vessel	HMNZS Taupo	P3570	2009	340 tonnes	Devonport	Whangārei	Active as of 2026.
Naval Logistics Support (2)
–	South Korea (Hyundai Heavy Industries)		Replenishment oiler	HMNZS Aotearoa	A11	2020	26,000 tonnes	New Plymouth	–	Active as of 2025.
–	Australia (design / fitting out: Tenix Defence Williamstown shipyard); Netherlands (constructed at the IHC Merwede Shipyards Williamstown shipyard)		Multi-role vessel	HMNZS Canterbury	L421	2007	9,000 tonnes	Devonport	Lyttelton	Active as of 2026.
Laid-up ships (2)
Protector class	Australia (Tenix Defence Williamstown shipyard)		Offshore patrol vessel	HMNZS Wellington	P55	2010	1,900 tonnes	Devonport	Dunedin	Laid up as of 2022.
Lake class	New Zealand (Tenix Defence Whangārei shipyard)		Inshore patrol vessel	HMNZS Hawea	P3571	2009	340 tonnes	Devonport	Greymouth / Westport	Laid up.

== See also ==
- List of ships of the Royal New Zealand Navy
