= HMNZS Waima =

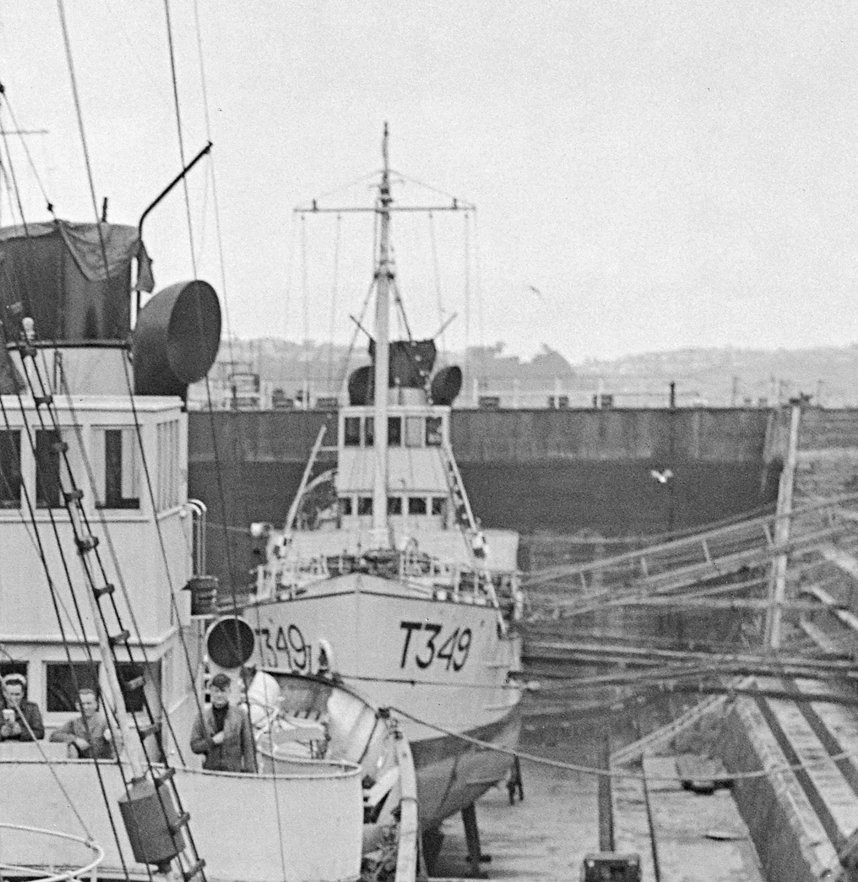
- HMNZS Waima

History

New Zealand
- Name: Waima
- Builder: Stevenson & Cook, Port Chalmers
- Launched: 3 April 1943
- Commissioned: 28 March 1944
- Decommissioned: 1945
- Identification: Pennant number: T33/T349
- Fate: Sold to Red Funnel Trawlers

Australia
- Name: Moona
- Owner: Red Funnel Trawlers
- Acquired: 1946
- In service: 1946
- Out of service: 1960
- Fate: Scrapped in 1964

General characteristics
- Class & type: Castle-class minesweeper
- Tonnage: 290 GRT
- Displacement: 625 tons
- Length: 135 ft (41 m)
- Beam: 23 ft (7.0 m)
- Depth: 13 feet (4.0 m)
- Propulsion: Single screw, triple reciprocating engine
- Speed: 10 knots (19 km/h; 12 mph)

HMNZS Waima was one of eight steel New Zealand-built Castle-class trawlers built and commissioned by the Royal New Zealand Navy during World War II.

== Background ==
The vessel was ordered after the New Zealand government, facing a requirement for more minesweepers to operate in home waters, chose the Castle-class design because it was simple enough to be built with the country's limited ship construction facilities at the time.

== Operational history ==
Waima was the eighth of the nine steel minesweepers constructed for the Royal New Zealand Navy (RNZN) and was commissioned on 28 March 1944. the others being Aroha, Awatere, Hautapu, Maimai, Pahau, Waiho, Waipu, and Waikato (never commissioned). She served with the 96th Auxiliary Minesweeping Group, located at Lyttelton. In September 1945, Waima along with the Waiho and Waipu were converted into danlayers, with operations ceasing October 1945 due to coal shortages, resuming in March 1946 with a guaranteed supply of coal for all 3 trawlers with them making up part of the 25th Auxiliary Minesweeping Division, which was formed to sweep the Waitematā Harbour for a final time.

== Post RNZN history ==
Waima would be sold to Red Funnel Trawlers, located in Sydney in May 1946, being towed to Australia by the Matai, arriving on 12 September 1946. She would be renamed to Moona, and began trawling in February 1947, being laid up in December 1958. She would temporarily re-enter service in February 1960 but would be laid up once again in July 1960. In 1963, she would be sold to Robin & Co. Ltd, located in Singapore to be scrapped. Moona, along with the Maldanna, left Sydney for Singapore on April 4 1963, under tow by the coaster Mourilyan, but 4 days later, both trawlers went adrift 60 miles NE off Newcastle. Both trawlers eventually were recovered with the help of the tug Cerberus, and towed to Newcastle to re-rig the tow.

The voyage to Singapore resumed on 11 April 1963, but 100 miles out of Newcastle, both trawlers once again broke adrift. Maldanna was recovered, but Moona was left adrift until she was recovered by the trawler Kestrel, being towed into the Clarence River on April 17 1963, and was anchored at Iluka, later being beached there.

In September 1964, Moona was purchased by Joe Ferrari of Sydney to be broken up at Rozelle Bay, arriving there after a 3 day voyage on November 12, 1964, and was completely dismantled by 1965.
