= HMNZS Hautapu =

Castle class minesweeper

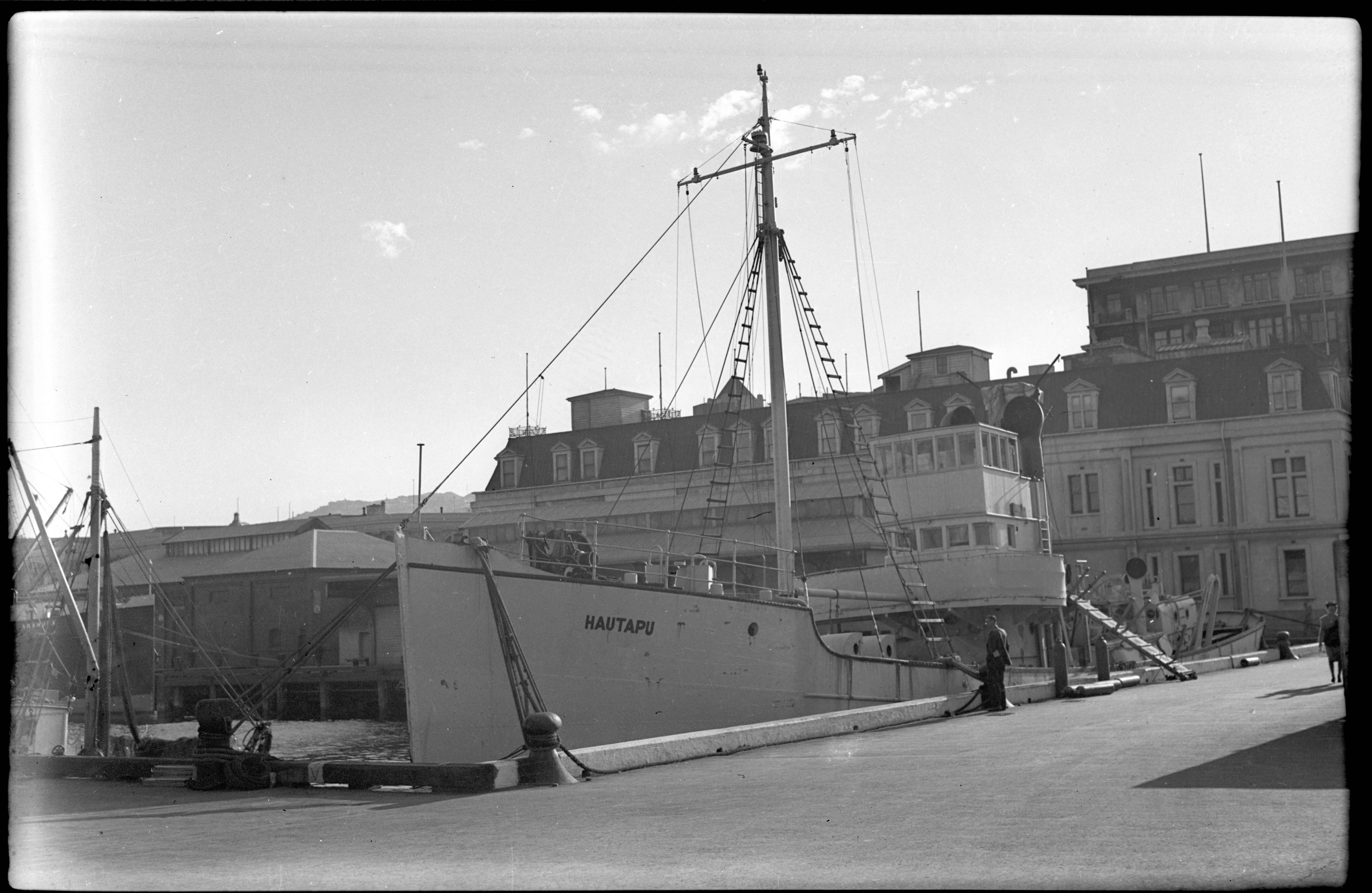
- HMNZS Hautapu

History

New Zealand
- Name: Hautapu
- Builder: Stevenson & Cook, Port Chalmers
- Launched: 20 November 1942
- Commissioned: 28 July 1943
- Decommissioned: 1947
- Identification: Pennant number: T26/T340
- Fate: Sunk at Shelly Bay in 1966

General characteristics
- Class & type: Castle-class minesweeper
- Displacement: 625 tons
- Length: 135 ft (41 m)
- Beam: 23 ft (7.0 m)
- Propulsion: Single screw, triple reciprocating engine
- Speed: 10 knots (19 km/h; 12 mph)

HMNZS Hautapu was one of eight steel New Zealand-built Castle-class trawlers built and commissioned by the Royal New Zealand Navy during World War II.

== Background ==
The vessel was ordered after the New Zealand government, facing a requirement for more minesweepers to operate in home waters, chose the Castle-class design because it was simple enough to be built with the country's limited ship construction facilities at the time.

== Operational history ==
Hautapu was the third of the nine steel minesweepers constructed for the Royal New Zealand Navy (RNZN) and was commissioned on 28 July 1943. the others being Aroha, Awatere, Maimai, Pahau, Waiho, Waima, Waipu, and Waikato (never commissioned). She served with the 96th Auxiliary Minesweeping Group, located at Lyttelton. In 1945 Hautapu was assigned to the Canterbury project to improve radar and meteorological observations but was not actively involved until 1946. In 1947, Hautapu was involved in the 1947 Royal New Zealand Navy mutinies, with a party of sailors giving a note to the captain stating that they were dissatisfied with the handling of lower-deck committees and that they would not work until their issues were resolved. Eleven sailors subsequently left the ship, but one later changed his mind and returned. Despite this, Hautapu still continued to Lyttelton, without the crew.

== Post RNZN service ==
Later in 1947, Hautapu was put up for sale and sold to New Zealand Fisheries Ltd. (which was located in Wellington) to serve as a fishing trawler. In 1963, Hautapu was laid up, due to high operating costs, and poor results with fishing, later being put back into service.

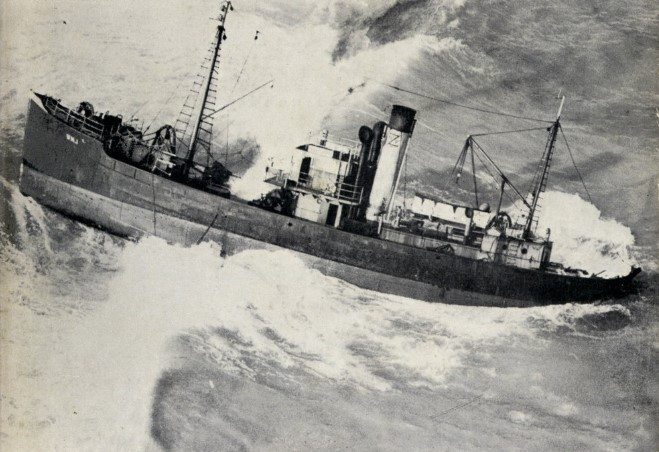
Hautapu shortly after she ran aground.

On 4 November 1963, Hautapu struck an unidentified object and was run aground off the Marlborough east coast, damaging the rudder, and was pulled towards the beach despite her being in full astern. All eight crew members onboard survived. Following this there were attempts to salvage the Hautapu, but none would succeed. Hautapu was eventually salvaged on 29 April 1964, and was towed to Wellington. Once salvaged it was found vandals had stripped the vessel of most of her gear. When Hautapu reached Wellington, she would be taken on to a slipway for inspection, to determine the fate of the ship. After the inspection she was declared a total loss as it was found the waves had damaged her structurally, with repair being considered futile. As they owned the trawler Taiaroa (formerly HMNZS Waikato) New Zealand fisheries decided to keep Hautapu for spare parts for Taiaroa. After two years Hautapu was offered to the Royal New Zealand Air Force (RNZAF) to be sunk, which they accepted. She was to be towed by HMNZS Inverell, and attacked by de Havilland Vampire and English Electric Canberra jets. Plans of sinking her were postponed after the MV Kaitawa sank with all hands lost, with the Inverell being sent to locate her wreck. However, on 2 June 1966, Hautapu sank at Shelly Bay after a stern charge was detonated, which was placed there in case the RNZAF could not sink the Hautapu. After the sinking, there was a legal dispute on who owned the wreck, with the RNZAF claiming that the New Zealand Fisheries Ltd still owned the wreck, and the New Zealand Fisheries Ltd claiming the RNZAF owned the wreck, resulting in a six-year legal battle. In July 1972, after another gathering of officials, the Secretary of Defence would assist in removing the wreck of Hautapu, while denying ownership of her. She was cut up in 1972–1973 by divers of the Royal New Zealand Navy, with the floating crane Hikitia raising the sections ashore to be scrapped.
