= HMNZS Waipu =

Castle-class trawler built for the RNZN

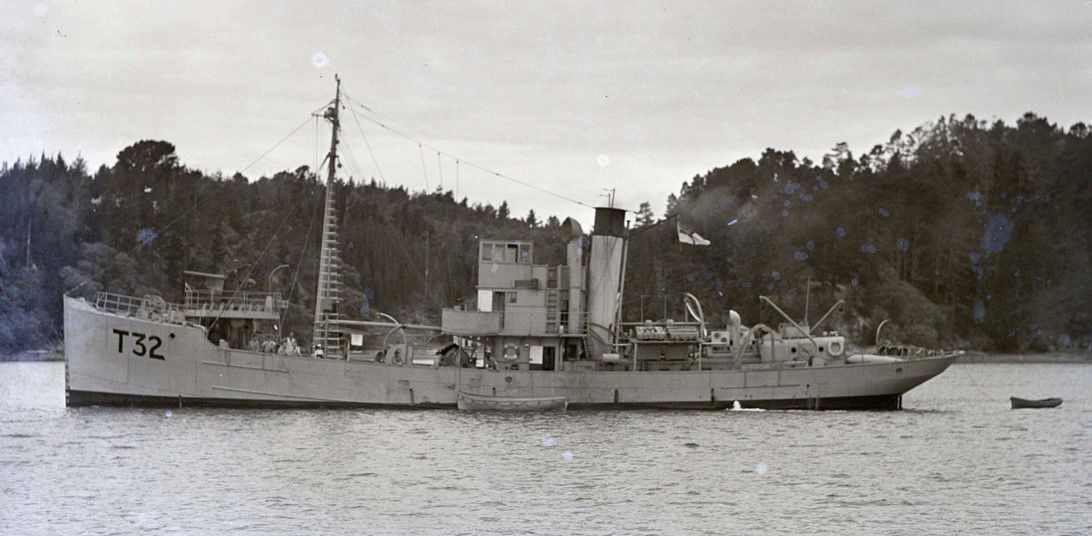
- HMNZS Waipu

History

New Zealand
- Name: Waipu
- Builder: Stevenson & Cook, Port Chalmers
- Launched: 1 August 1943
- Commissioned: 17 November 1943
- Decommissioned: 1946
- Identification: Pennant number: T32/T357
- Fate: Sold to Red Funnel Trawlers in 1954

Australia
- Name: Mulloka
- Owner: Red Funnel Trawlers
- Acquired: 1954
- In service: 1955
- Out of service: 1958
- Fate: Scrapped in 1963

General characteristics
- Class & type: Castle-class minesweeper
- Displacement: 625 tons
- Length: 135 ft (41 m)
- Beam: 23 ft (7.0 m)
- Propulsion: Single screw, triple reciprocating engine
- Speed: 10 knots (19 km/h; 12 mph)

HMNZS Waipu was one of eight steel New Zealand-built Castle-class ships built and commissioned by the Royal New Zealand Navy during World War II.

== Background ==
The vessel was ordered after the New Zealand government, facing a requirement for more minesweepers to operate in home waters, chose the Castle-class design because it was simple enough to be built with the country's limited ship construction facilities at the time.

== Operational history ==
Waipu was the sixth of the nine steel minesweepers constructed for the Royal New Zealand Navy and was commissioned on 17 November 1943. the others being Aroha, Awatere, Hautapu, Maimai, Pahau, Waiho, Waima, and Waikato (never commissioned). She served with the 97th Auxiliary Minesweeping Group, located at Auckland. In June 1944, she was involved with the salvage of the beached Panamanian freighter Kator. In December 1944, she pulled a United States Army oil barge off Ripiro Beach, 32 km (20 mi) north of Kaipara Heads. With the United States Army tug, Culverden, towing it to Auckland for repairs, arriving two days later. In 1945, she would be converted into a danlayer, with operations ceasing due to coal shortages. After the war, Waipu was sold to Sanford Ltd of Auckland, for use as a fishing trawler. In 1954, she was sold to Red Funnel Trawlers Pty Ltd. and began trawling from Sydney in 1955, being laid up in 1958. In 1963 she was sold to Robin & Co Ltd, located in Singapore for breaking up.
