= HMNZS Aroha =

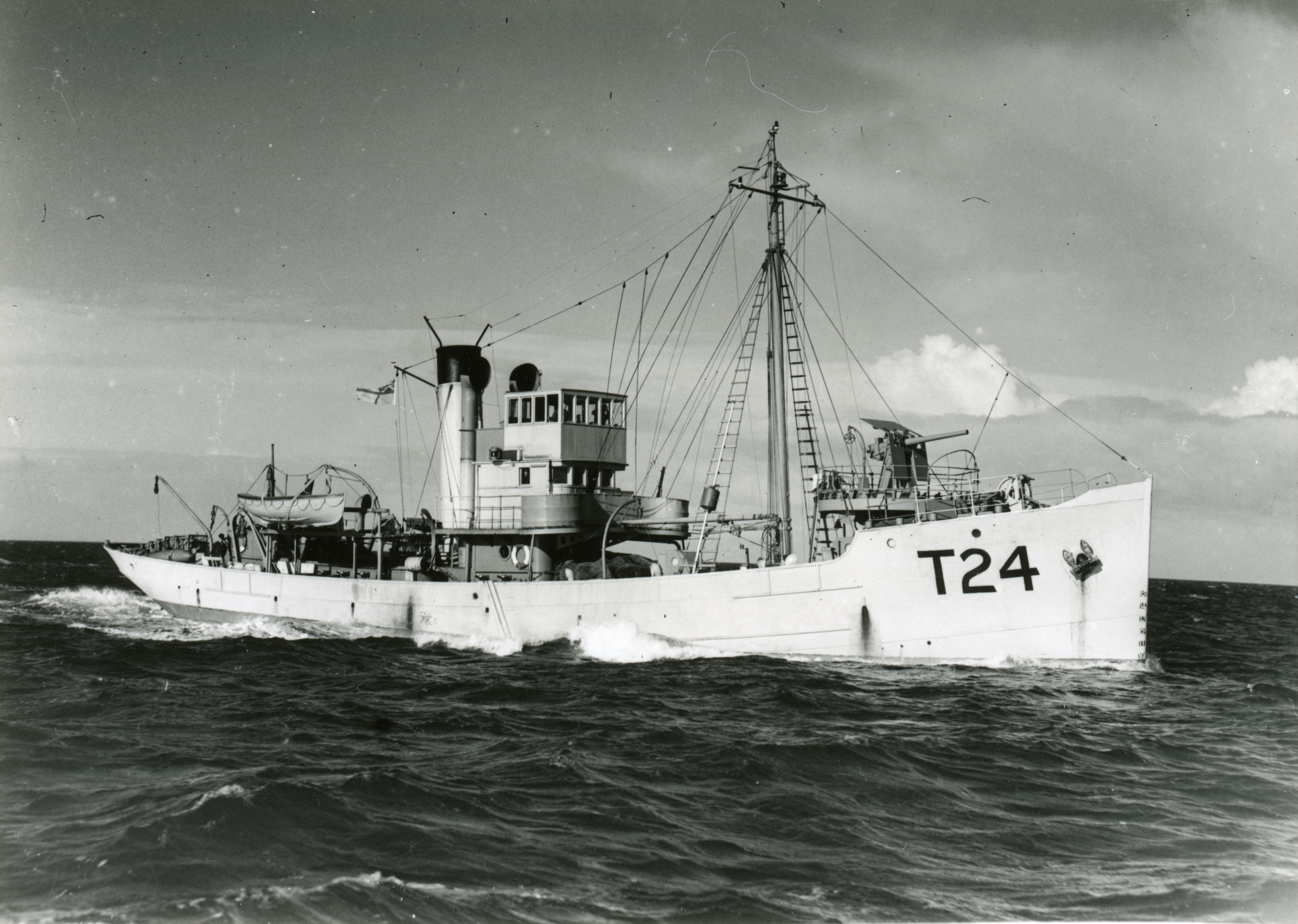
- HMNZS Aroha

History

New Zealand
- Name: Aroha
- Builder: Stevenson & Cook, Port Chalmers
- Laid down: 5 November 1941
- Launched: 9 September 1942
- Commissioned: 12 May 1943
- Decommissioned: 1945
- Identification: Pennant number: T24/T396
- Fate: Sold to Red Funnel Trawlers

Australia
- Name: Maldanna
- Owner: Red Funnel Trawlers
- Acquired: 1946
- In service: 1946
- Out of service: 1958
- Fate: Scrapped in 1963

General characteristics
- Class & type: Castle-class minesweeper
- Displacement: 625 tons
- Length: 135 ft (41 m)
- Beam: 23 ft (7.0 m)
- Propulsion: Single screw, triple reciprocating engine
- Speed: 10 knots (19 km/h; 12 mph)

HMNZS Aroha was one of eight steel New Zealand-built Castle-class ships built and commissioned by the Royal New Zealand Navy during World War II. It was the first steel Castle-class trawler launched for the Royal New Zealand Navy.

== Background ==
The vessel was ordered after the New Zealand government, facing a requirement for more minesweepers to operate in home waters, chose the Castle-class design because it was simple enough to be built with the country's limited ship construction facilities at the time.

== Operational history ==
Aroha was the first of nine steel minesweepers constructed for the Royal New Zealand Navy and was commissioned on 17 November 1943. the others being Awatere, Hautapu, Maimai, Pahau, Waiho, Waima, Waipu, and Waikato (never commissioned). It served with the 97th Auxiliary Minesweeping Group, located at Auckland. Aroha ran aground twice during her career, first on 28 August 1943 off North Head and then three days later near the entrance to Whangārei Harbour, damaging her rudder and stern post. Repairs took two months.

In October 1944, Aroha towed the badly damaged Flower-class corvette Arbutus from Fiji to Auckland after it suffered damage to its rudder, propeller, and hull. In 1945, Aroha was offered on loan to the British Pacific Fleet, along with Waipu, Arabis, Kiwi, and Tui. Only Aroha was required, and she sailed from Wellington to Sydney, serving there for six weeks. After the six weeks ended, it sailed to Auckland to be paid off.

In 1946, along with Waiho and Waima, Aroha was sold to Red Funnel Trawlers, and began fishing the same year. It was laid up in 1958 and sold for scrap in 1963.
