= HMNZS Waiho =

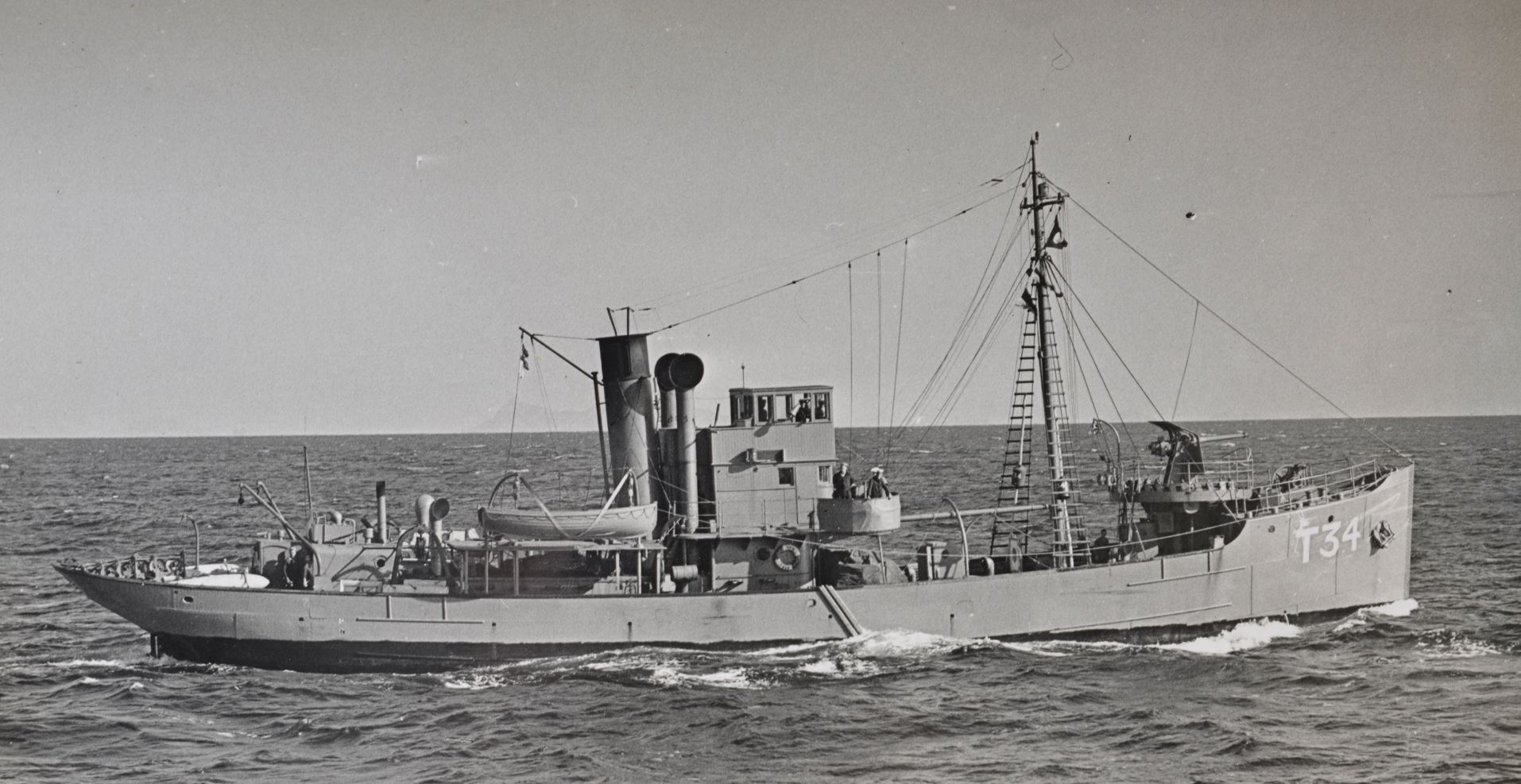
- HMNZS Waiho

History

New Zealand
- Name: Waiho
- Builder: Stevenson & Cook, Port Chalmers
- Launched: 19 February 1944
- Commissioned: 3 June 1944
- Decommissioned: 1946
- Identification: Pennant number: T34/T403
- Fate: Sold to Red Funnel Trawlers

Australia
- Name: Matong
- Owner: Red Funnel Trawlers
- Acquired: 1946
- In service: 1946
- Out of service: 1958
- Fate: Scrapped in 1963

General characteristics
- Class & type: Castle-class minesweeper
- Displacement: 625 tons
- Length: 135 ft (41 m)
- Beam: 23 ft (7.0 m)
- Propulsion: Single screw, triple reciprocating engine
- Speed: 10 knots (19 km/h; 12 mph)

HMNZS Waiho was one of eight steel New Zealand-built Castle-class ships built and commissioned by the Royal New Zealand Navy during World War II. She was the last Castle-class trawler built for any navy.

== Background ==
The vessel was ordered after the New Zealand government, facing a requirement for more minesweepers to operate in home waters, chose the Castle-class design because it was simple enough to be built with the country's limited ship construction facilities at the time.

== Operational history ==
Waiho was the last of the nine steel minesweepers constructed for the Royal New Zealand Navy and was commissioned on 3 June 1944. the others being Aroha, Awatere, Hautapu, Maimai, Pahau, Waima, Waipu, and Waikato (never commissioned). She served with the 97th Auxiliary Minesweeping Group, located at Auckland.

The day she was commissioned, she ran aground and was towed off after two hours, suffering a twisted rudder and popped rivets. In 1944, the Waiho was struck by the Tui. In 1945, she struck the Auckland ferry Makora, with damage to the ferry. In 1946, she was sold to Red Funnel Trawlers, and was towed to Australia by the Matai.

She began fishing in 1946, and was laid up in 1958. She was sold for scrap in 1963.
