= HMNZS Pahau =

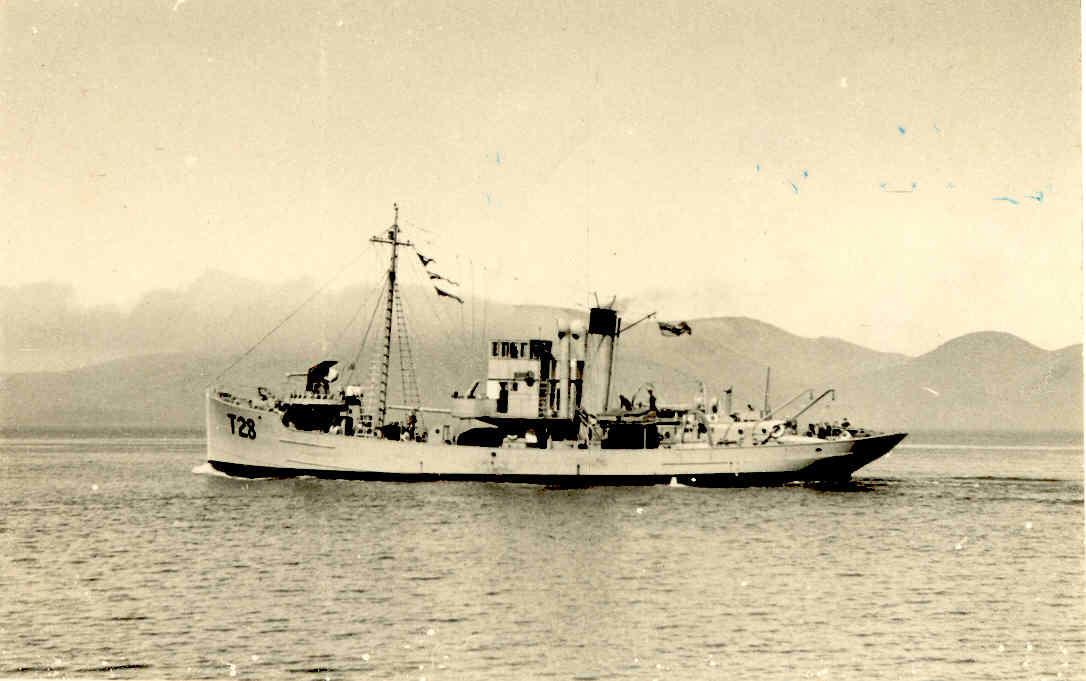
- HMNZS Pahau

History

New Zealand
- Name: Pahau
- Builder: Stevenson & Cook, Port Chalmers
- Launched: 3 April 1943
- Commissioned: 12 February 1944
- Decommissioned: 1945
- Identification: Pennant number: T28/T351
- Fate: Sold to Arthur. A. Murrell of Sydney

Australia
- Name: Pahau
- Owner: A. A. Murrell
- Acquired: 1946
- In service: 1946
- Out of service: October 1946
- Fate: Purchased by the Australian Commonwealth Government, allocated to the UNRRA.

Australia
- Name: Pahau
- Owner: United Nations Relief and Rehabilitation Administration
- In service: 1946
- Fate: Last seen fishing October 1949

General characteristics
- Class & type: Castle-class minesweeper
- Tonnage: 290 GRT
- Displacement: 625 tons
- Length: 135 ft (41 m)
- Beam: 23 ft (7.0 m)
- Depth: 13 feet (4.0 m)
- Propulsion: Single screw, triple reciprocating engine
- Speed: 10 knots (19 km/h; 12 mph)

HMNZS Pahau was one of eight steel New Zealand-built Castle-class trawlers built and commissioned by the Royal New Zealand Navy during World War II.

== Background ==
The vessel was ordered after the New Zealand government, facing a requirement for more minesweepers to operate in home waters, chose the Castle-class design because it was simple enough to be built with the country's limited ship construction facilities at the time.

== Operational history ==
Pahau was the fifth of the nine steel minesweepers constructed for the Royal New Zealand Navy and was commissioned on 12 February 1944. the others being Aroha, Awatere Hautapu, Maimai, Waiho, Waima, Waipu, and Waikato (never commissioned). She served with the 95th Auxiliary Minesweeping Group, located at Wellington. In March 1946, Pahau would be sold to Arthur. A. Murrel of Sydney along with Awatere. On 22 May, 1946, while being towed to Australia by the Matai, Pahau would break free from the Matai, becoming adrift. She would be located a few days later and would arrive at Sydney on 28 May 1946. In October 1946, Pahau was brought by the Australian Commonwealth Government and was allocated to the UNRRA to rebuild the decimated Chinese fishing industry. She was last seen with the Awatere and Tawhai fishing at Formosa (now Taiwan).
