= HMNZS Awatere =

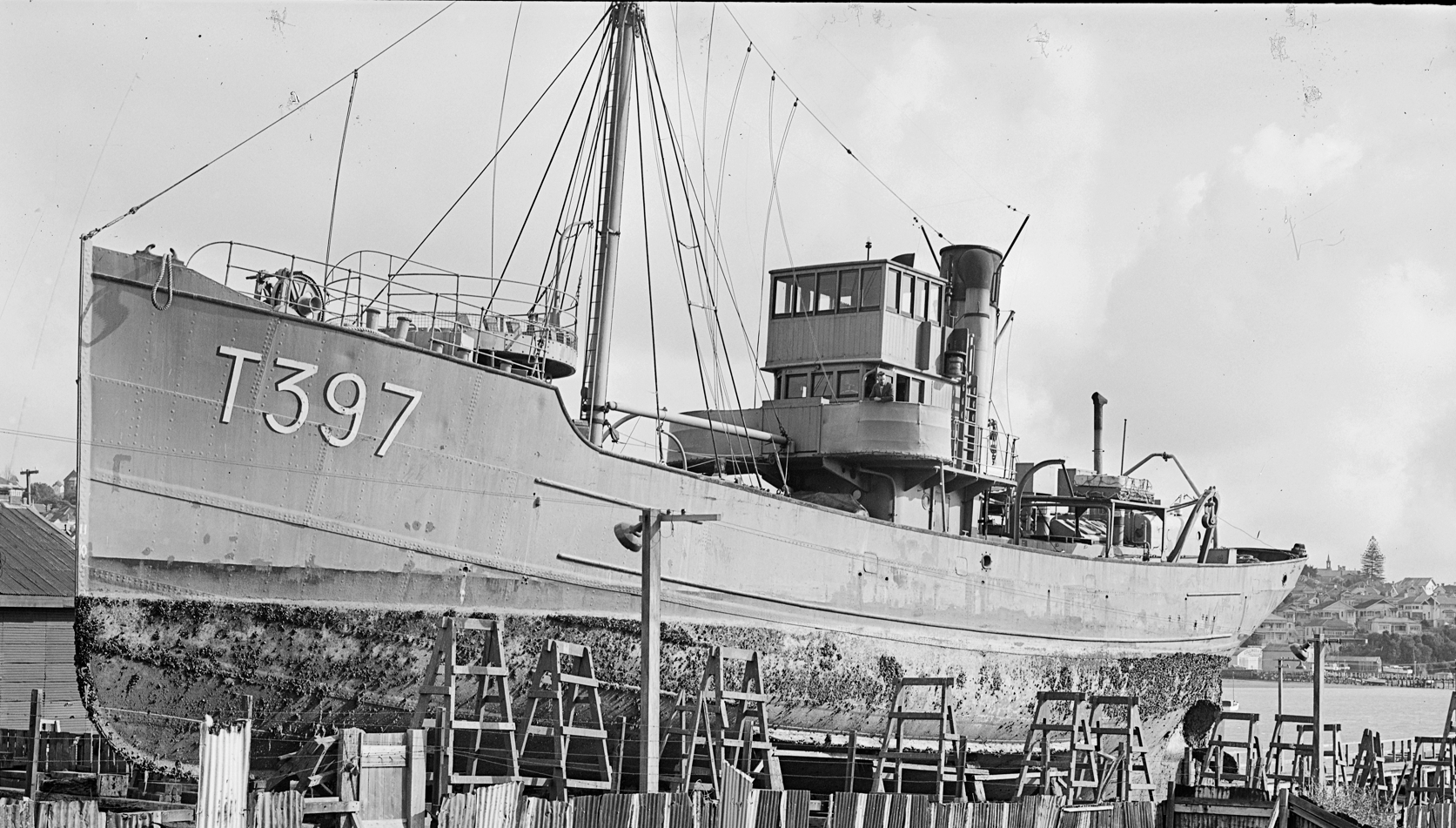
- HMNZS Awatere on a slipway.

History

New Zealand
- Name: Awatere
- Builder: Patent Slip, Wellington
- Laid down: 14 March 1942
- Launched: 26 September 1942
- Commissioned: 26 June 1943
- Decommissioned: 1945
- Identification: Pennant number: T25/T397
- Fate: Sold to Arthur. A. Murrell of Sydney

Australia
- Name: Awatere
- Owner: Arthur. A. Murrell
- Acquired: 1946
- In service: 1946
- Out of service: October 1946
- Fate: Purchased by the Australian Commonwealth Government, allocated to the UNRRA.

Australia
- Name: Awatere
- Owner: United Nations Relief and Rehabilitation Administration
- In service: 1946
- Fate: Last seen fishing October 1949

General characteristics
- Class & type: Castle-class minesweeper
- Displacement: 625 tons
- Length: 135 ft (41 m)
- Beam: 23 ft (7.0 m)
- Propulsion: Single screw, triple reciprocating engine
- Speed: 10 knots (19 km/h; 12 mph)
- Boats & landing craft carried: 1
- Complement: 12 (after conversion to a fishing trawler)

HMNZS Awatere was one of eight steel New Zealand-built Castle-class ships built and commissioned by the Royal New Zealand Navy during World War II.

== Background ==
The vessel was ordered after the New Zealand government, facing a requirement for more minesweepers to operate in home waters, chose the Castle-class design because it was simple enough to be built with the country's limited ship construction facilities at the time.

== Operational history ==
Awatere was the second of the nine steel minesweepers constructed for the Royal New Zealand Navy and was commissioned on 28 July 1943. the others being Aroha, Hautapu, Maimai, Pahau, Waiho, Waima, Waipu, and Waikato (never commissioned). She served with the 95th Auxiliary Minesweeping Group, located at Wellington. On 27 July 1945, Awatere would ram the Maimai stern-to-stern at Shelly Bay, with minor damage. In March 1946, Awatere would be sold to Arthur. A. Murrel of Sydney along with Pahau. In October 1946, Awatere was brought by the Australian Commonwealth Government and was allocated to the UNRRA to rebuild the decimated Chinese fishing industry. She was last seen with the Pahau and Tawhai fishing at Formosa (now Taiwan).
