= HMNZS Waikato =

HMNZS Waikato has been the name of two ships of the Royal New Zealand Navy:

- HMNZS Waikato (1943), never commissioned, sold and renamed Taiaroa in 1946
- HMNZS Waikato (F55), commissioned 1966 and decommissioned 1998
