= Minesweepers of the Royal New Zealand Navy =

Commissioned minesweepers and danlayers of the Royal New Zealand Navy (RNZN) from its formation on 1 October 1941 to the present. The RNZN was created two years into World War II. For coherence this article covers the war years from the start, and thus includes also the New Zealand minesweepers operating from the beginning of the war.

== World War II minesweepers ==
During World War II the RNZN operated 39 minesweepers and danlayers. This included 20 naval trawlers (13 Castle class, three Bird class and four Isles class), five converted trawlers, 10 converted merchant boats, and four danlayers.

=== Naval trawlers ===
Naval trawlers were trawlers purpose built to Admiralty specification to operate as minesweepers and/or anti-submarine boats.

==== Castle class ====
Thirteen Castle-class naval trawlers were commissioned. Apart from James Cosgrove and Wakakura, all were built in New Zealand by government directive, circa 1942. They were 135 feet (41.1 m) long, displaced 540 tons standard or 612 tons loaded, and were designed for a complement of 27. The three-cylinder engine of 480 indicated horsepower (358 kW) from A&G Price of Thames gave a speed of 10 knots (19 km/h). The coal-fired boiler was of the Scotch marine type. The boiler size governed the size of ship that could be manufactured, and as boiler plate of the required size was not available, two completed boilers and some partly completed boilers were supplied from Britain.

Image	Name	Pnd	Admiralty number	Builder	Launched	Commissioned	Decommissioned	Career	Fate
	HMNZS Aroha	T24	T396	Stevenson & Cook, Port Chalmers	9 September 1942	12 May 1943	1945	Served at Auckland	Sold to Red Funnel trawlers, renamed to Maldanna. Scrapped 1963 at Singapore.
	HMNZS Awatere	T25	T397	Patent Slip, Wellington	26 September 1942	26 June 1943	1945	Served at Wellington	Sold to A. A. Murrell of Sydney, Then purchased by the UNRRA in 1946.
	HMNZS Hautapu	T26	T340	Stevenson & Cook, Port Chalmers	20 November 1942	28 July 1943	1947	Served at Lyttelton	Sunk at Shelly Bay in 1966
	HMNZS Hinau	T17	T399	Senior Foundry Co., Auckland	28 August 1941	23 July 1942	1945	Served at Auckland	Hulk ran aground for use as a breakwater and shingle bin between 1955 and 1958
	HMNZS James Cosgrove	T10		Ailsa Shipbuilding Co.	5 March 1918	10 October 1939	1944	Served at Auckland	Sunk in 1952
	HMNZS Maimai	T27	T338	Stevenson & Cook, Port Chalmers	25 February 1943	15 September 1943	1945	Served at Wellington	Scrapped in 1966
	HMNZS Manuka	T19	T401	Mason Bros, Auckland	23 September 1941	30 March 1942	1945	Served at Auckland	Sunk in 1952
	HMNZS Pahau	T28	T351	Stevenson & Cook, Port Chalmers	3 April 1943	12 February 1944	1945	Served at Wellington	Sold to A. A. Murrell of Sydney then purchased by the UNRRA in 1946.
	HMNZS Rimu	T18	T402	Seager Bros Shipbuilders Ltd	9 September 1941	15 July 1942	1945	Served at Auckland	Hulk sunk by the RNZAF 1958
	HMNZS Tawhai	T20	T348	Seager Bros Shipbuilders Ltd	20 July 1943				Never commissioned. Sold to the UNRRA in 1946.
	HMNZS Waiho	T34	T403	Stevenson & Cook, Port Chalmers	19 February 1944	3 June 1944	1946	Served at Auckland	Sold to Red Funnel trawlers, renamed to Matong Scrapped 1964 in Australia.
	HMNZS Waikato	T30	T343	Mason Bros, Auckland	16 October 1943				Never commissioned. Sold and renamed to Taiaroa, sunk by the RNZAF in 1989
	HMNZS Waima	T33	T349	Stevenson & Cook, Port Chalmers	December 11, 1943	28 March 1944	1946	Served at Lyttelton	Sold to Red Funnel trawlers renamed to Moona. Scrapped 1964 in Australia.
	HMNZS Waipu	T32	T357	Stevenson & Cook, Port Chalmers	1 August 1943	17 November 1943	1946	Served at Auckland	Sold to Sanford Ltd in 1946 1955 renamed Mulloka for Red Funnel Trawlers. Scrapped 1964 in Australia.
	HMNZS Wakakura	T00		Port Arthur Shipbuilding, Port Arthur	September 1917	1926	1947	1926–1941 was HMS Wakakura in the New Zealand Division of the Royal Navy. Used as danlayer from July 1944.	Scrapped in 1953

===== Cancelled =====
Name	Pnd	Builder	Cancelled	Notes
HMNZS Konini		Stevenson & Cook, Port Chalmers	April 1943	Originally ordered as a composite minesweeper, then steel. Previous chosen names were Miro and Ngaio.
HMNZS Waiau	T31	Mason Bros, Auckland	October 1943	Previous chosen names were Konini and Kapuka.
HMNZS Wai-iti		Stevenson & Cook, Port Chalmers	1 October 1943	
HMNZS Waikaka		Stevenson & Cook, Port Chalmers	October 1943	Fabrications of the hull had started.

==== Bird class ====
The Bird-class naval trawlers were 168 feet (51.2 m) long, displaced 923 tons full load, and could manage 13 knots (24 km/h). They had a complement of 33–35 and were armed with one 4-inch (102 mm) gun, two Hotchkiss guns in single mounts, twin Lewis guns and 40 depth charges. They were equipped with asdic.

Image	Name	Pnd	Commissioned	Decommissioned	Career	Notes
	HMNZS Kiwi (T102)	T102	1941; 1948; 1951	1946; 1949; 1956	AS MS; Training ship Training ship	On 29 January 1943, along with Moa, she rammed and wrecked the Japanese submarine I-1
	HMNZS Moa (T233)	T233	1941	1943	AS MS	On 29 January 1943, along with Kiwi, she rammed and wrecked the Japanese submarine I-1. Moa was sunk by enemy aircraft on 7 April 1943 near Tulagi Harbour in the Solomon Islands. Five crew men were lost.
	HMNZS Tui (T234)	T234	1941; 1952; 1956	1946; 1955; 1967	AS MS; Training ship Research ship	On 19 August 1943 Tui and some US Kingfisher floatplanes jointly sank the Japanese submarine I-17. Sold for scrap in December 1969 and scrapped.

==== Isles class ====
The Isles-class naval trawlers were 164 feet (50.0 m) long, displaced 740 tons full load, and could manage 12 knots (22 km/h). They had a complement of 40 and were armed with one 12-pounder gun, three 20mm Oerlikons in single mounts and depth charges.

Image	Name	Pnd	Commissioned	Decommissioned	Career	Fate
	HMNZS Inchkeith	T155	1941	1946		Sold to G A Sparrey August 1958. Broken up at the Lighter basin in Freemans bay, 1959
	HMNZS Killegray	T174	1941	1946		Sold to G A Sparrey August 1958. Broken up at the Lighter basin in Freemans bay, 1959
	HMNZS Sanda	T160	1941	1946		Sold to G A Sparrey August 1958. Broken up at the Lighter basin in Freemans bay, 1959 and hulk was used as a shingle bin near Waikauri Bay, Takatu along with Humphrey. Hulk towed back to Auckland 1970 and scrapped.
	HMNZS Scarba	T175	1941	1946		Sold to G A Sparrey August 1958. Broken up at the Lighter basin in Freemans bay, 1959

==== Strath class ====
Image	Name	Pnd	Launched	Commissioned	Decommissioned	Career	Fate
	HMNZS Humphrey	T06		1941	1944		Hulked for use as a shingle bin near Waikauri Bay, Takatu. Hulk towed back to Auckland in April 1970 and scrapped.
	HMNZS Thomas Currell	T11	1919	1941	1944	Served at Auckland	Deliberately ran aground at Port Hutt, Chatham island in 1968

=== Other types ===
==== Converted trawlers ====
These vessels were usually armed with a quick-firing 4-inch (102mm) or 3-inch (76mm) gun on a raised bow platform, some machine guns, and depth charges. Vessels used for minesweeping were also fitted with minesweeping and mine handling equipment.

Image	Name	Pnd	Launched	Commissioned	Decommissioned	Career	Fate
	HMNZS Futurist	T09		1941	1944	Functioned as a boom gate vessel 1944	Sunk 19 March 1947 near the Flaxbourne River mouth
	HMNZS South Sea	T08		1941	1942	Served at Wellington	Previously HMT Ferriby of the Royal Navy, launched as a civilian trawler in 1913. Sunk 19 December 1942 in collision with inter-island ferry Wahine in Wellington Harbour

==== Converted merchant boats ====
These ships were usually armed with a quick-firing 4-inch gun, machine guns and autocannon. Vessels used for minesweeping were also equipped with the appropriate equipment.

Image	Name	Pnd	Admiralty number	Commissioned	Decommissioned	Career	Fate	Notes
	HMNZS Breeze	T02	T371	1942	1944		Sold to Manila, Philippines 1964. Name changed to Balabac 1966	
	HMNZS Duchess	T07		1940	1945	examination vessel 1942–45 liberty launch 1945	Hulk ran aground at Wreck Bay, Rangitoto Island (the last ship to be run aground at Rangitoto Island) in June 1947.	Former Wellington and, later, Waiheke ferry. Built 1897; iron deck framing remained at Rangitoto Island in 2014.
	HMNZS Gale	T04	T370	1941	1944		Broken up 1970	
	HMNZS Hawera	T16	T398	1941	1945	Functioned as supply ship in 1945.	Sank at the Western Viaduct 1952. Refloated and beached in St Mary's bay but was removed 1956–57	
	HMNZS Kapuni	T15	T400	1941	1945	Functioned as patrol boat 1940 and supply ship 1944–45.	Broken up 1971	
	HMNZS Matai	T01	T372	1941	1946	Functioned as transport ship 1945–1946.	Broken up 1965	
	HMNZS Muritai	T05		1941	1946	Functioned as training and cable-lifting ship 1945–1946.	Scuttled off an island in Hauraki Gulf on 7 September 1963. Refloated and broken up at Auckland in 1971.	
	HMS Puriri	T02		1941	1941		14 May 1941 struck a German mine 9 miles (14 km) NE of the Whangarei heads and sunk with the loss of 5 crew members.	Puriri was sunk just before the creation of the RNZN.
	HMNZS Rata	T03		1941	1943		Broken up at Hong Kong 1959	
	HMNZS Viti		T373	1941	1945	Operated at Fiji, and would visit New Zealand annually.		

==== Danlayers ====
Image	Name	Pnd	Type	Commissioned	Decommissioned	Career	Fate
	HMNZS Coastguard	T12	Converted trawler	1941	1960	Functioned as a stores ship 1945–1960	Rebuilt (2020) to become the office for Heartland Timbers (a small private company in New Zealand). Name changed to Kaikohe post RNZN ownership.
	HMNZS Kaiwaka	T14	Converted merchant ship	1941	1945		Scuttled early 2000s
	HMNZS Nora Niven	T23	Converted trawler	1941	1944		Scuttled off Taiaroa Heads 1947
	HMNZS Phyllis	T22	Converted trawler	1943	1944		Ran aground 1954

=== COMSOPAC ===
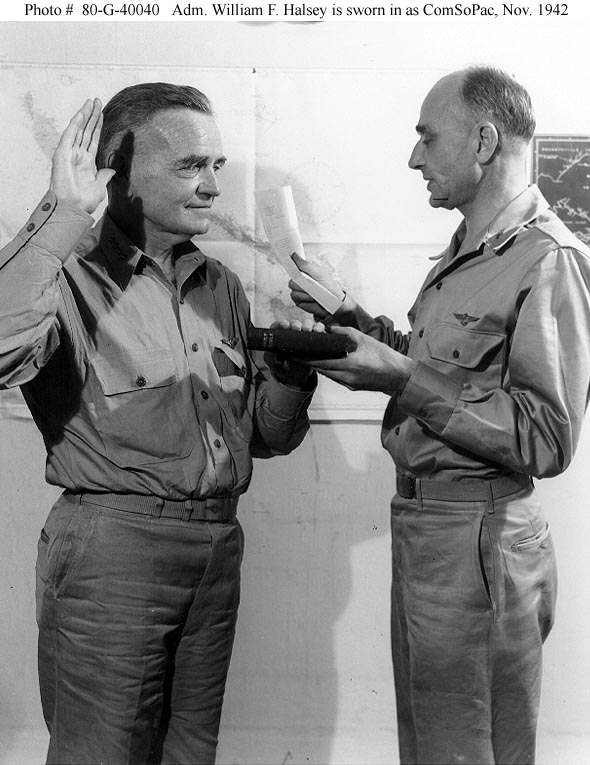
William Halsey sworn in as ComSoPac in November 1942

COMSOPAC is an acronym for Commander South Pacific. During World War II, one of the major United States theatre commands was the command of the South Pacific Area. This command was usually referred to as COMSOPAC (COMmander SOuth PACific)

It was formed in April 1942 as a subordinate command of Pacific Ocean Areas, commanded by Robert L. Ghormley through October 1942, William Halsey, Jr. to June 1944, John H. Newton to March 1945, and William L. Calhoun to the end of the war.

In June 1942 New Zealand passed the operational control of most of its South Pacific naval forces to COMSOPAC. This continued until COMSOPAC released control in June 1945.

The headquarters for COMSOPAC were initially located in Auckland, New Zealand. In July 1942 they were transferred to Nouméa, New Caledonia.

=== The 25th Minesweeping Flotilla ===
In the early months of World War II the New Zealand minesweepers had no formal grouping as a flotilla. Then Niagara was sunk in June 1940. On 18 July 1940 the Naval Board designated the First Group for coastal minesweeping, and allocated Port minesweepers to the main ports. They were:

First Group

- Futurist, Humphrey, James Cosgrove, South Sea, Thomas Currell, Wakakura
- Danlayer: Coastguard

Port Minesweepers

- Dutchess, Muritai, Nora Niven

On 14 November 1940, a few weeks after the founding of the Royal New Zealand Navy, they were reorganised as the First Minesweeping Flotilla (NZ)

First Group

- Group leader: Matai
- Muritai, Rata, Gale, Puriri
- Danlayer: Coastguard

Port Minesweepers

- First Minesweeping Group: Wakakura, Humphrey, Duchess – Auckland
- Second Minesweeping Group: South Sea, Futurist – Wellington
- Third Minesweeping Group: James Cosgrove, Thomas Currell – Lyttelton

Then on 23 December 1940 the Port minesweepers were separated, and the remaining minesweepers were organised into the 25th Minesweeping Flotilla. This name aligned with the flotilla names used by the Royal Navy. The makeup of this flotilla changed during the course of the war, as new minesweepers were commissioned, others sunk or withdrawn for repairs or refitting, and requirements changed.

Here is a snapshot of the 25th Minesweeping Flotilla on 27 March 1943:

7th Trawler Group – Auckland

- Four Isles class: Inchkeith, Killegray, Sanda, Scarba

30th Trawler Group

- Kiwi, Tui
- The Loop Guard:
- Danlayers:Nora Niven, Phillis

194th Auxiliary Minesweeping Group – Auckland

- LL magnetic minesweepers: Hinau, Manuka, Rimu, Hawera, Kapuni

94th Auxiliary Minesweeping Group – Auckland

- Matai, Breeze, Gale

95th Auxiliary Minesweeping Group – Wellington

- Futurist, Rata
- Danlayers: Kaiwaka, Coastguard

96th Auxiliary Minesweeping Group

- James Cosgrove, Thomas Currell

The Port minesweepers were organised into their own flotillas. Eleven new Castle-class minesweepers joined the Port flotillas on completion, 1943–1944.

== Post war ==
=== Ton class ===
The RNZN operated two Ton-class minesweepers on anti-infiltration patrols in Malaysian coastal waters during 1966 and 1967. They are the only commissioned RNZN ships never to have visited NZ.

Name	Dates	Career	Fate
HMNZS Santon (M1178)	1965–1966		1967 sold to Argentina and renamed ARA Chubat (M3)
HMNZS Hickleton (M1131)	1965–1966		1967 sold to Argentina and renamed ARA Neuquen (M1)

These Admiralty designed coastal minesweepers were built with composite hulls of wood on aluminium frames and a minimum of magnetic material in the hull. They were intended to meet the threat of seabed mines laid in shallow coastal waters. Their shallow draft gave them some protection against pressure and contact mines, and allowed them to navigate in shallow inshore waters. They were 153 feet (47 m) long, displaced 360 tons standard, could manage 15 knots (28 km/h), and had a complement of 32. They were named after British villages which ended with "ton".

Early in 1965 Indonesia was employing a policy of confrontation against Malaysia. New Zealand agreed to assist Malaysia by deploying two Royal Navy minesweepers then in reserve at Singapore. These were commissioned into the RNZN on 10 April 1965 and joined the Royal Navy's 11th Minesweeping Squadron (also Ton class), taking part in anti-infiltration patrols in Malaysian waters.

In their first year they carried out 200 patrols, with 20 incidents involving intruding Indonesians, often taking as prisoners those aboard intercepting small craft. By the time the Indonesian confrontation policy ended in August 1966 Hickleton and Santon had jointly steamed 130,000 miles (210,000 km).

== See also ==
- Anti-submarine warfare
- Coastal Forces of the Royal New Zealand Navy
- RNZN Fairmiles in the Solomons
