= SS Ben Dearg =

20th-century British trawler

Coordinates: 35.01044196°S 118.05166556°E

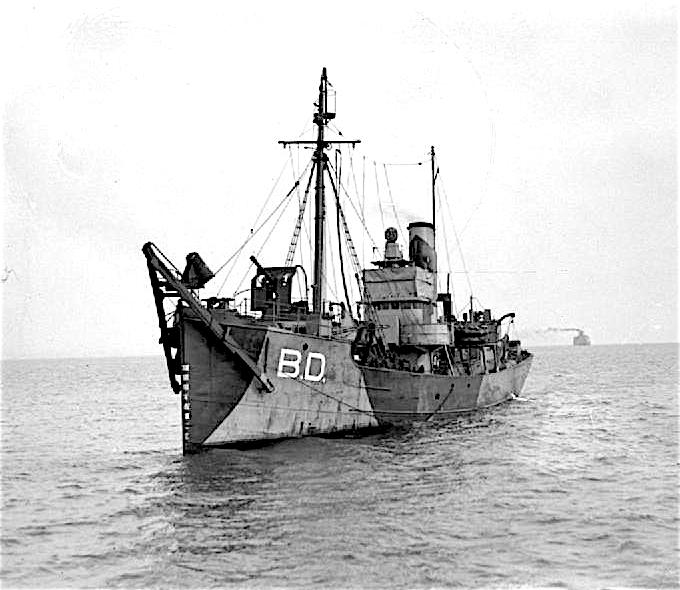
- HMT Ben Dearg during World War II

History

United Kingdom & Australia
- Name: Ben Dearg
- Owner: Anglo-Australian Fishing Company
- Builder: Cook, Wellington and Gemmell Ltd
- Laid down: Beverley
- Launched: 18 July 1919
- Stricken: Scuttled 1956
- Fate: Scuttled

General characteristics
- Class & type: Castle-class trawler
- Tonnage: 280 tons
- Length: 38.3 metres (126 ft)
- Beam: 7.2 m (24 ft)
- Draught: 3.9 m (13 ft)
- Propulsion: triple expansion steam engine

SS Ben Dearg was ordered by The Admiralty as the Castle-class trawler Thomas Alexander, she was launched 18 July, 1919 well after WWI ended. In January 1920 she was allocated to the National Fishery Scheme for setting up the "Minesweeper's Cooperative Trawling Society, Ltd." of London. She was completed as a fishing trawler 4 June, 1920. In August, 1921 she was sold to "Remy & Huret", Boulogne and renamed Etoile Polaire II, Sold to Fred Parkes of Blackpool and renamed Daily Express in February, 1930. She was sold again in December, 1933 and renamed Turcoman. After being sold again she was renamed Ben Dearg in October, 1936 and was requisitioned as a minesweeper in World War II in 1939 by the British Admiralty. She was returned to her owner in 1946.

1 July, 1949 she was sold to Anglo-Australian Fisheries Limited, Perth Australia. She departed Fleetwood 16 July with a 15 man English crew who all volunteered to settle in Australia. She arrived in Freemantle, Western Australia, on 16 September, 1949.

The single-screw steamer was coal burning, with a single-ended boiler that generated 180 lb per square inch of pressure of steam. Both Ben Dearg and the sister vessel Commiles were considered to be obsolete and unsuitable for fishing in the Great Australian Bight by 1951, and were looking for fishing grounds closer to Albany which they could trawl safely.

An attempt was made to sell the vessel by Anglo-Australian Fisheries Limited in February 1954.

Following the liquidation of Anglo-Australian Fisheries Limited, the trawler was sold to Krasnostein and Company, a company based in Perth, in June 1954. It was advertised later in the year for £8000.

The single-screw steamer was scuttled on 14 April 1956 off Ben Dearg Beach near Swarbricks Beach, between Herald Point and Islet Point along the coast to the east of Albany in the Great Southern region of Western Australia, very close to the coal hulk Margaret.

The ship's propeller is on display outside the Western Australian Museum, Albany.

== See also ==
- List of shipwrecks of Australia § Western Australia
