= HMS Sir Galahad =

Minesweeper of the Royal Navy

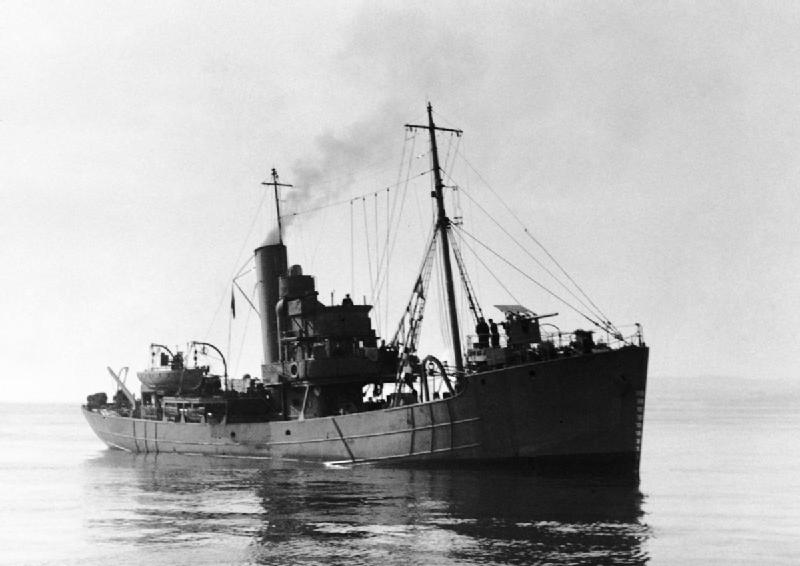
- Sir Galahad in April 1942

History

United Kingdom
- Name: HMS Sir Galahad
- Laid down: 13 June 1941
- Launched: 18 December 1941
- Commissioned: 28 February 1942
- Decommissioned: February 1946
- Stricken: April 1946
- Fate: Transferred to civilian ownership
- Name: Star of Freedom
- Owner: Walker Steam Trawling & Fishing Co Ltd
- Acquired: April 1947
- Fate: sold March 1956
- Name: Robert Limbrick
- Owner: Milford Fisheries Ltd
- Acquired: March 1956
- Fate: Ran aground on Quinish Point off Mull, 5 February 1957

General characteristics (Royal Navy service)
- Class & type: Round Table-class minesweeper, later danlayer
- Displacement: 440 long tons (447 t)
- Length: 125 ft (38.1 m)
- Beam: 23 ft 6 in (7.2 m)
- Draught: 13 ft 9 in (4.2 m)
- Complement: 35
- Armament: 1 × 12 pounder 76 mm (3.0 in) anti-aircraft gun; 1 × 20 mm anti-aircraft gun; 2 × machine guns

HMS Sir Galahad was a trawler built for the British Royal Navy in 1941. Post war it was sold into civilian service and was wrecked in 1957 after running aground off the Isle of Mull.

== Construction and war service ==
The vessel was built by Hall, Russell & Company of Aberdeen to a 1936 design of the same company. Although the design was for a trawler the ship was commissioned as a minesweeper (Pennant number T226). Launched in December 1941 she was the second member of the Round Table class. In March 1943 the Sir Galahad was one of the first ships to respond when the aircraft carrier HMS Dasher sank in the River Clyde. In 1944, having been converted to a danlayer, Sir Galahad was attached to the 14th Minesweeping Flotilla, part of Force U. The 14th Minesweeping Flotilla took part in Operation Neptune, the maritime part of the Normandy Landings.

== Post war ==
Decommissioned in February 1946, the ship was sold in April of the same year to the Walker Steam Trawling & Fishing Co Ltd of Aberdeen and renamed Star of Freedom, her merchant marine registration number being A283. Walker's sold the vessel onto Milford Fisheries Ltd of Milford Haven who renamed the ship again as the Robert Limbrick.

=== Loss ===
Wreck of Robert Limbrick off Quinish Point, Mull

Less than a year after purchase by Milford Fisheries Ltd, the Robert Limbrick was lost at sea with the loss of all 12 of her crew. She had sailed from Milford on 2 February 1957 under skipper William Burgoyne to fish for hake off Scotland. On 5 February reports were received by Oban radio that the ship was aground off Quinish Point, Mull (56°38′00″N 6°13′42″W) and that the crew had abandoned ship. Despite a search by other vessels in the area and the lifeboat from Mallaig, no survivors were found and only two bodies were recovered at the time. The bodies of the rest of the crew were washed ashore over the next weeks.

The ship's total loss was reported by the Salvage Association's surveyor on 7 February 1957 who reported:

Trawler Robert Limbrick, ashore Quinish Point, Mull: Survey shows vessel lying on port side, which not visible but damage to this side suspected extensive. Starboard side so far as visible severely damaged from forecastle to stem. Shell plating fractured from bulwark to keel and badly holed in way of fish hold also abreast of bridge. Deck fractured abreast of fish hold, stern frame broken, rudder missing, suspect propeller and tailshaft badly damaged. Engine-room and hull flooded and lifeboat badly stove in. Forward portion of vessel flexing with action of sea where fractured, not possible to board. Consider salvage impracticable. Further SW gales will accelerate vessel breaking up.

A memorial service was held for the crew at St Katherine's church, Milford Haven on 27 February 1957.
