= HMT Alvis =

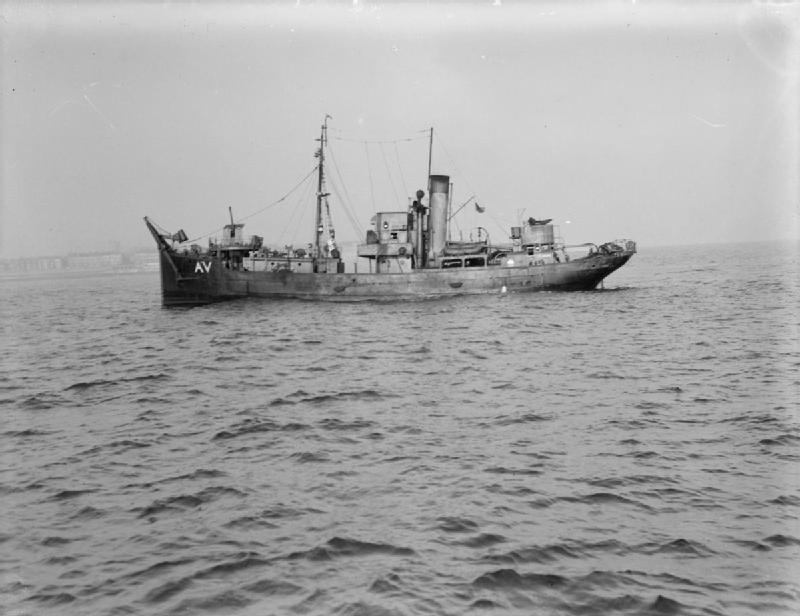
- Alvis underway

History
- Name: Peter Hall, Transport Union, Alvis (H52)
- Owner: Admiralty, London; Société Anonyme Armement Ostendais, Ostend; Saint Andrew’s Steam Fishing Co Ltd, Hull
- Builder: Ailsa Shipbuilding Company, Ayr
- Yard number: 344
- Launched: 6 November 1918
- Identification: ON (UK) 143948
- Fate: Requisitioned, 1940
- Name: HM Trawler Alvis
- Acquired: 30 Apr 1940
- Identification: Pennant number 4118
- Fate: Released from Service, Mar 1945
- Name: Alvis (H52, then FD46)
- Owner: Ocean Steam Trawling Co Ltd, Hull; Milford Fisheries Ltd, Milford; Boston Deep Sea Fisheries, Hull; Argosy Trawling Co Ltd, Fleetwood
- Acquired: Mar 1945
- Fate: Scrapped, 1954

General characteristics
- Type: Naval trawler
- Tonnage: 279 grt
- Length: 125 ft (38 m) o/a
- Beam: 23.5 ft (7.2 m)
- Draught: 12.8 ft (3.9 m)
- Propulsion: 480ihp T.3-cyl by Fawcett Preston & Co Ltd, Liverpool
- Armament: 1 x 12 pounder 76 mm (3.0 in) gun

HM Trawler Alvis was a British trawler that was taken up from trade and used by the Royal Navy during the Second World War. She was returned to the fishing industry at the end of hostilities in 1945.

== Pre-war career ==
On 6 November 1918, it was launched at the Ailsa Shipbuilding Company at Ayr, for the Admiralty as Peter Hall and registered by The Admiralty in the Registry of British Ships at London in 1919. On 24 August 1920 it was registered as a fishing vessel at London. In November 1924 it was to Société Anonyme Armement Ostendais, Ostend and on 29 November registered at Ostend as Transport Union. On 27 December 1935 Transport Union rescued crew of fourteen from the Dutch trawler Cornelia Maria (SCH135) which was sinking. In 1939 it was sold to Saint Andrew's Steam Fishing Co Ltd, Hull and registered on 1 May at Hull as Alvis (H52). Fishing from Fleetwood.

== Early World War II ==
On the 18 September 1939, just after the start of the war, Alvis was fishing in the vicinity of St Kilda in the Outer Hebrides. At about 1.20pm a shot was heard and a large spout of water erupted close to the Alvis. The skipper and crew then spotted a German submarine. The skipper, Albert Thomason, was signalled from the U-boat and instructed to abandon his vessel. The small lifeboat was launched and the crew left the Alvis. The lifeboat pulled alongside the submarine, the U-35, and the commander, Werner Lott, asked for the captain of the Alvis. Thomason went aboard the submarine and, on the conning tower, Lott extended his hand in welcome. He then said, " I am sorry but I will have to sink your ship" and asked Skipper Thomason if there were anymore crew aboard the Alvis. The crew and Lott, all speaking very good English, handed cigarettes to the Alvis crew, and then ordered them back to their vessel. Lott sent a working party over to Alvis under the command of a Lieutenant. On their arrival, they threw the wireless overboard and then chopped away the fishing gear and smashed the dynamo in the engine room. The Lieutenant asked Thomason if he could take a lifebelt as a souvenir, which he did. However, Lott gave Thomason a bottle of gin in return with his compliments.

No provisions or the fish caught were taken from the Alvis by the Germans. The reason the U-boat commander did not sink the Alvis was that, in his opinion, the 13-man crew would never make it back to shore in their lifeboat. The Alvis returned unharmed to her homeport of Fleetwood, but that same day the U-Boat commander found three other Fleetwood vessels. They were the Arlita, the Lord Minto, and the Nancy Hague. After removing the crews from the Arlita and Lord Minto onto the Nancy Hague, the U-35 sank the two empty ships. The three crews returned to Fleetwood aboard the Nancy Hague. Alvis was subsequently requisitioned in 1940 by the Admiralty. Werner Lott was taken prisoner of war aboard HMS Kingston, with all of his crew, after he scuttled his U-boat on 29 November 1939.

=== U-35's account ===
The fishing trawler Alvis was the first British ship the German submarine U-35 encountered in the North Atlantic. She allowed Alvis to pass unharmed on 18 September 1939, after realising that the thirteen man crew could never have reached land in the available lifeboat. In return, the British captain warned U-35 that the Royal Navy aircraft carrier Ark Royal was in the general area.

U-35's war diary recorded:

- Name and size of the vessel: "St. Alvis", 271 Br T
- Name of owner: unknown
- Port of registry: Hull
- Port of departure : Fleetwood
- Destination port: Fleetwood
- Flag visible: none

"The steamer is of enemy origin. He should be destroyed, because confiscation is not possible. His operation area was far away from the coast and because of that he could not be considered a "coastal fishery vessel". The fish catching equipment and the radio were thrown overboard. The crew of 13 which had already embarked into the rescue boat was advised to get back onto the ship, because the freeboard of it was already very narrow and was not considered seaworthy. The steamer was dismissed. There were no attempts to escape or other resistance."

== Naval Service ==
Alvis was requisitioned for war service as an anti-submarine trawler on 30 April 1940. She was given the pennant number 4118 and the Admiralty paid a hire rate of £84 per month. Alvis was given one QF 12-pdr 12 cwt gun as her main armament and assigned to the Royal Naval Patrol Service.

Alvis was fitted out as a minesweeper in May 1941, and from January 1942 she was based at Hartlepool with M/S Group 148. She took part in the minesweeping operations that were vital to the success and safety of the Allied landings in Normandy in 1944:

'To the minesweepers and their attendant consorts was to fall the responsibility of leading the assault forces to the Normandy beaches. Contingent upon their effectiveness and timely efficiency in clearing the German mine barrier protecting the area, there lay the potential to cross that finely dividing line between success, or otherwise...'

'... the War Cabinet fully appreciates that, but for the courage, skill and devotion of HM Minesweeping forces, the success of the recent amphibious operations, and especially of the landings in Normandy, could not have been achieved...'

— Winston Churchill (quoted by Barnett Correlli)

== Fate ==
Alvis was returned to civilian service just before the end of the war in Europe in March 1945. She was then owned by a number of companies including: Ocean Steam Trawling Co Ltd, Milford Fisheries Ltd, Boston Deep Sea Fisheries Ltd, and Argosy Trawling Co Ltd of Fleetwood. Alvis was eventually scrapped at Barrow-in-Furness in 1954.
