= Danlayer =

Ship for marking areas swept for mines

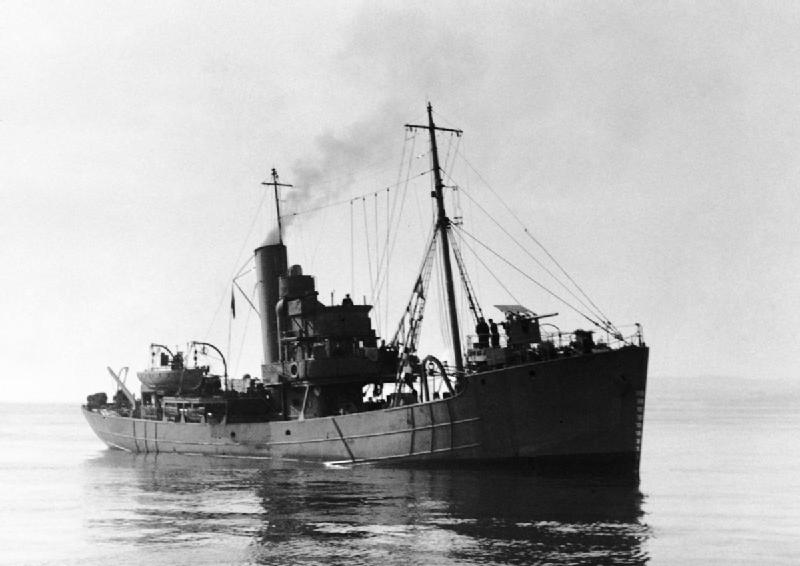
HMS Sir Galahad, a Round Table-class trawler displacing 440 long tons, was converted to a danlayer in 1944 and used to support the Normandy landings

A danlayer was a type of vessel assigned to minesweeping flotillas during and immediately after World War II. They were usually small trawlers, fitted for the purpose of laying dans. A dan is a marker buoy which consists of a long pole moored to the seabed and fitted to float vertically, usually with a coded flag at the top.

Dan laying was an important part of minesweeping, and boats were fitted specifically for this purpose. The task of a danlayer was to follow the minesweepers as they worked an area, and lay the dans which defined the area swept and made it obvious where the clear channels were. This would also help the minesweepers cover areas accurately without gaps and unnecessary overlaps. A danlayer worked with a minesweeper flotilla when large areas of sea were to be swept.

== List of danlayers ==
=== Germany ===
Since Germany had been an exponent of mine warfare since the 1920s, it was natural that the Kriegsmarine used a number of danlayers during World War II. Danlayers of the Kriegsmarine included the following vessels:

- The 800-ton, 176-foot B 206 - This vessel was ceded to France in 1946 and outfitted as the surveying vessel Ingénieur Hydrographe Nicolas
- The 120-ton, 82-foot B 253, B 254, B 261, B 262, B 264, B 273 and B 275 - These were ceded to France in 1946 and renamed Rachgoun, Treberon, Tourteau, Cassidaigne, Les Madeleines, Habibas and Crabe, respectively. Tourteau and Crabe became surveying tenders, while the others were employed as small harbor transports for naval personnel.
- The 600-ton, 180-foot B 281 (formerly the patrol trawler V 204, originally named Zieten) - This vessel was ceded to France in 1946 and renamed Astrolabe as a surveying tender.
- The 500-ton, 137-foot B 282 and B 284 (formerly the whalers Treff. 6 and Traff. 2), respectively) - Both were ceded to France in 1946 and renamed Estafette and Sentinelle as surveying tenders.

=== United Kingdom ===
Danlayers employed by the Royal Navy during the extensive mine clearance operations following World War II included the following Isles-class trawlers.

- Hellisay (T391)
- Hermetray (T392)
- Imersay (J422)
- Orsay (J450)
- Ronay (J429)
- Sandray (J424)
- Scaravay (J425)
- Sheppey (T292)
- Shillay (J426)
- Sursay (J427)
- Tahay (J452)
- Tocogay (J451)
- Trodday (J431)
- Vaceasay (J432)
- Vallay (J434)
- Wiay (J441)

Two Round Table-class trawlers, Sir Lanceleot (T228) and Sir Galahad (T226) were converted from minesweepers to danlayers prior to the Normandy landings.

In 1944, prior to the Allied invasion of Normandy, the Admiralty-type Motor Mine Sweepers Nos. 141, 142, 238, 239, 240, and 241 were converted to danlayers and renamed HMS Burin, HMS Cottel, HMS Fichot, HMS Jude, HMS Quirpon, HMS St. Barbe. All were twin-screw, wooden, 105-foot, coastal-minesweeping sloops that were financed by Steers Ltd. of St. John's, Newfoundland and built by Henry Stone in his shipyard at Monroe, Trinity Bay, Newfoundland, Canada between 1941 and 1943.

=== New Zealand ===
Danlayers employed by the Royal New Zealand Navy during World War II

- HMNZS Coastguard (T12)
- HMNZS Ikatere
- HMNZS Kaiwaka (T14)
- HMNZS Nora Niven (T23)
- HMNZS Phyllis T22
- HMNZS Waiho (T34)
- HMNZS Waima (T33)
- HMNZS Waipu (T32)
