= HMNZS Matai =

History

New Zealand
- Name: HMNZS Matai (T01)
- Launched: 11 June 1930
- Commissioned: 1 April 1941
- Decommissioned: 25 April 1945

General characteristics
- Tonnage: 1,050 GRT, 383 NRT
- Length: 66.8 m (219 ft)
- Beam: 10.7 m (35 ft)
- Propulsion: triple expansion steam reciprocating, 1,050 ihp, twin shaft, oil
- Speed: 10 to 13 knots (19 to 24 km/h; 12 to 15 mph)
- Complement: 81
- Sensors & processing systems: asdic
- Armament: 1 × 4-inch gun, 2 × 20 mm Oerlikons, 2 machine guns, 40 depth charges,

HMNZS Matai (T01) was a Marine Department lighthouse tender which was requisitioned by the Royal New Zealand Navy (RNZN) and converted into a minesweeper.

== Operational history ==
Matai was the government's lighthouse tender servicing the marine lights around New Zealand and offshore islands, and had been used for cable laying in the 1930s. She was named after the native mataī tree.

She was requisitioned on 3 March 1941 and handed over to a dockyard for conversion.

After commissioning on 1 April 1941, Matai took over as the flotilla leader of the 25th Minesweeping Flotilla from Muritai and the flotilla began clearing a German minefield in the Hauraki Gulf.

The ship functioned as transport ship 1945–1946. She was broken up 1965.

== See also ==
- Minesweepers of the Royal New Zealand Navy
