= HMNZS Maimai =

Castle-class minesweeper of the New Zealand Navy

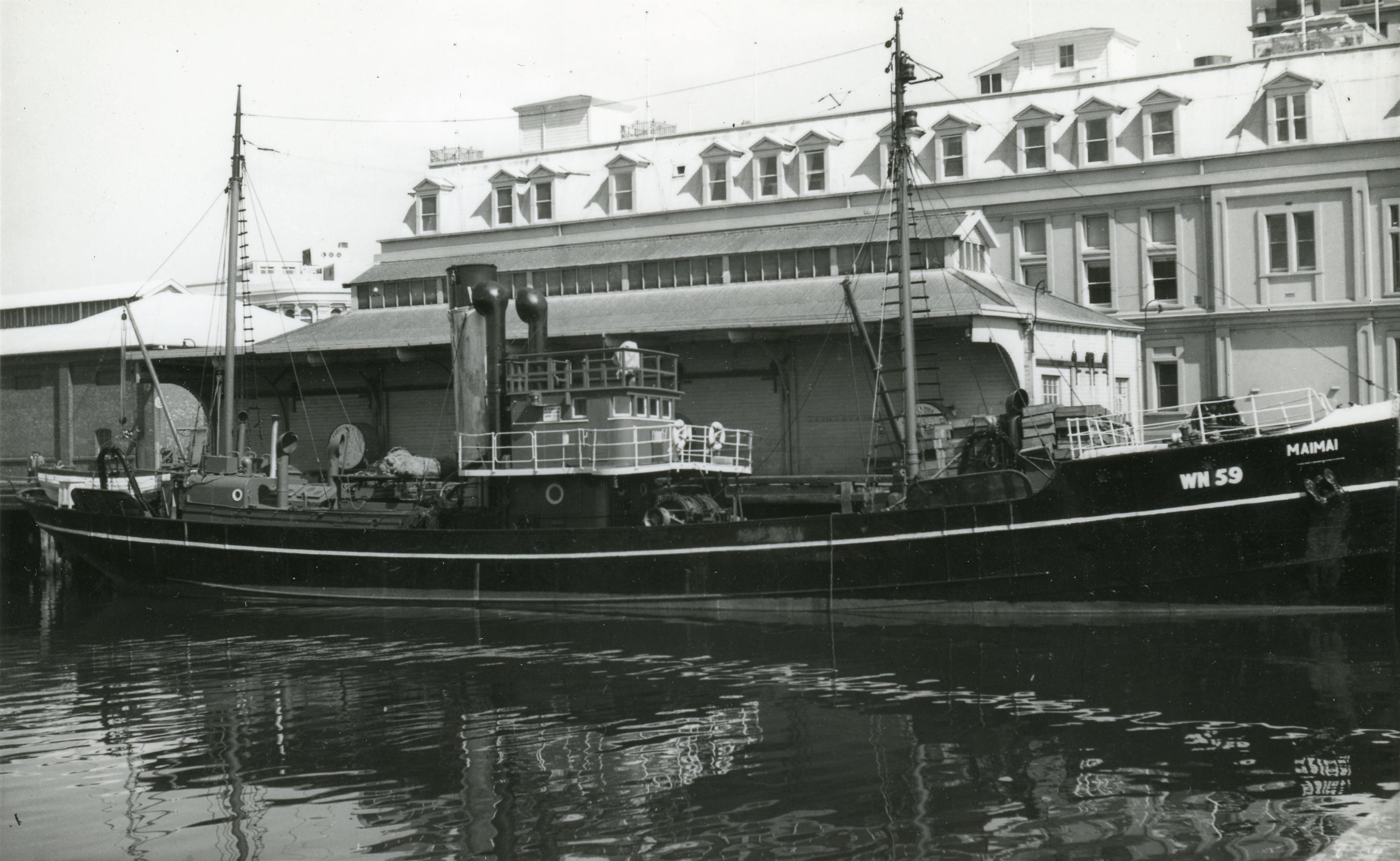
- ST Maimai at Queens Wharf

History

New Zealand
- Name: Maimai
- Builder: Stevenson & Cook, Port Chalmers
- Launched: 18 February 1943
- Commissioned: 15 September 1943
- Decommissioned: 1945
- In service: 1946
- Out of service: 1966
- Identification: WN59 Pennant number: T338 during WW2
- Fate: Scrapped in 1966

General characteristics
- Class & type: Castle-class minesweeper
- Displacement: 625 tons
- Length: 135 ft (41 m)
- Beam: 23 ft (7.0 m)
- Propulsion: Single screw, triple reciprocating engine
- Speed: 10 knots (19 km/h; 12 mph)

HMNZS Maimai was one of eight steel New Zealand-built Castle-class trawlers built and commissioned by the Royal New Zealand Navy during World War II.

== Background ==
The vessel was ordered after the New Zealand government, facing a requirement for more minesweepers to operate in home waters, chose the Castle-class design because it was simple enough to be built with the country's limited ship construction facilities at the time.

== Royal New Zealand Navy Service ==
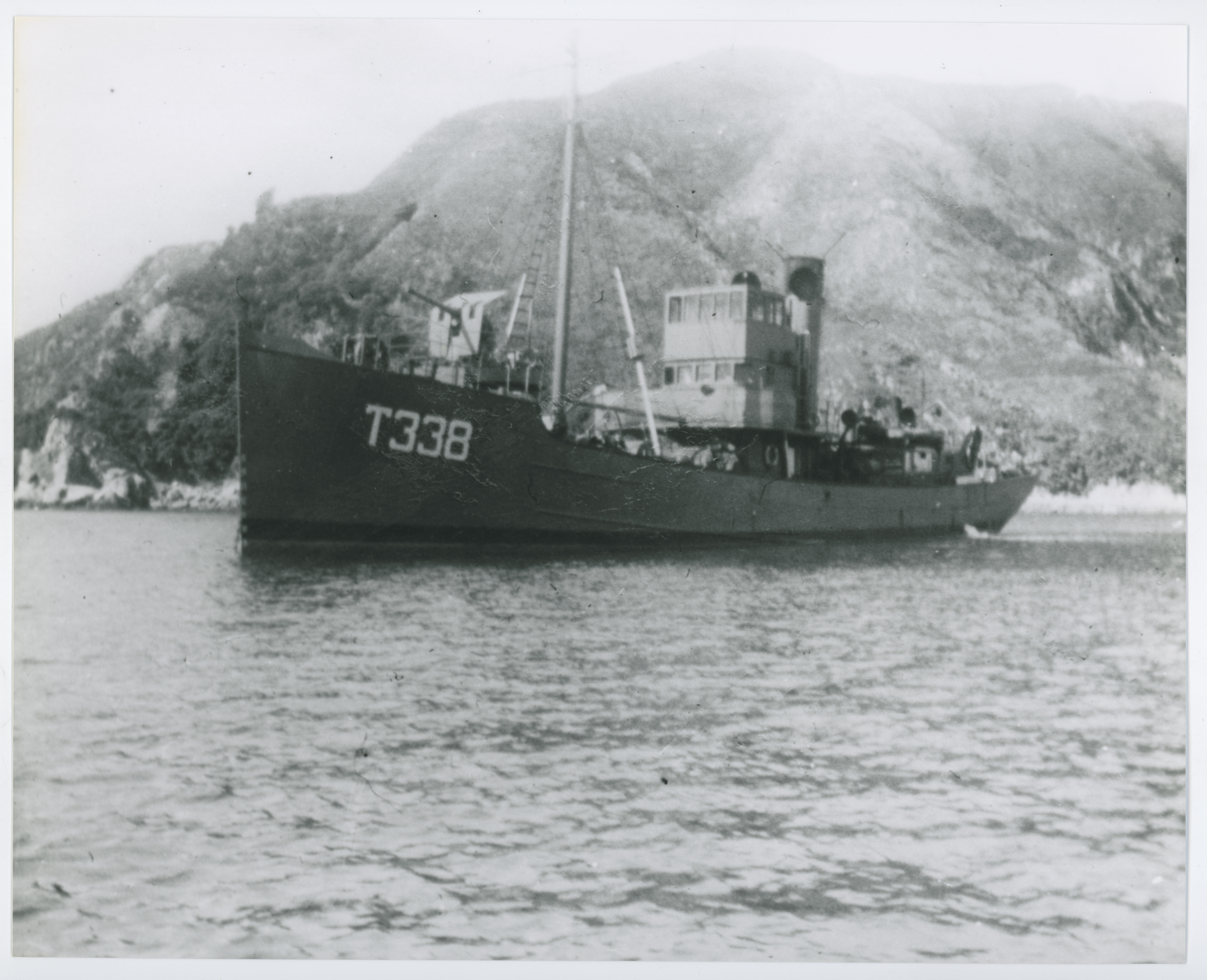
Maimai anchored somewhere in the Wellington Region, 1944

Maimai was the fourth of the nine steel minesweepers constructed for the Royal New Zealand Navy and was commissioned on 15 September 1943 serving with the 95th Auxiliary Minesweeping Group, located at Wellington. In March 1944, Maimai accidentally fired her port depth charge thrower while berthed at Picton. The unexploded depth charge was recovered four weeks later. On 27 July 1945, she was rammed by Awatere stern-to-stern at Shelly Bay, with minor damage. In December 1945 she accompanied the aircraft carrier HMS Indefatigable on exercises in New Zealand waters. Once World War II ended, Maimai was disarmed but would remain in service for ammunition dumping, and destoring the outlying stations around the Cook Strait and Marlborough Sounds. She would return to Wellington on December 10th, 1945 for paying off. But was used for the final time for cable and loop lifting work in Wellington Harbour. She was finally destored and handed to the Marine Department on the 18th of June 1946.

== As a Fishing Trawler ==
Maimai would be sold to John Anderson, in the name of the Maimai Trawling Company Ltd. and was to operate as a side trawler, entering service in September 1946. ,

In the early hours of March 19 1947, Maimai and the trawler Phyllis sighted distress rockets coming from long point, coming from the steam trawler Futurist, which had run aground at 3:50 AM, the 2 ships came to the aid of Futurist, but had to stand off until the sun rose. Maimai would sail up to Cape Campbell lighthouse to pick up rescue equipment, but was notified over radio by the crew of the Phyllis that the Futurist's crew had landed safely on shore after battling strong waves. The court of inquiry commended the skippers of Maimai and Phyllis for their prompt action in aiding the Futurist's crew, and the skipper of Maimai, John "Jock" Cardno, believed the actions were safe and no one would have thought the futurist would have drifted towards shore as it had when she ran aground.

In 1947 she caught nearly 100,000 lb (45,000 kg) of fish, being considered a record for four days of fishing at the time. On 28 July 1950, waste oil in Maimai's bilges caught fire, but was quickly extinguished by the Wellington Fire Brigade. As the years went by, catches got smaller and smaller, with conditions onboard of Maimai deteriorating. And with smaller and efficient fishing vessels being built, it became harder for Maimai to get a crew, with Maimai still sailing without a full crew. Maimai was purchased by Pacific Scrap LTD about November 1966, and she was taken to the patent slip and broken up over the course of 6 weeks.
