= Castle-class trawler =

1916 class of British naval trawlers

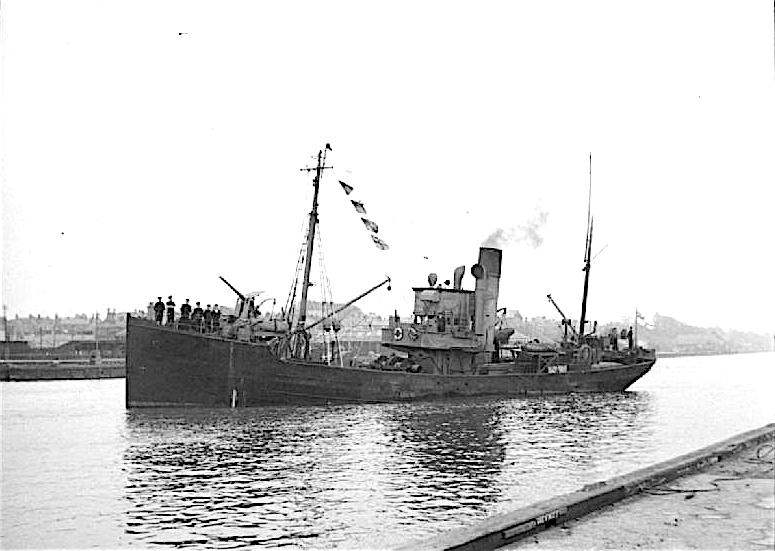
- HMT Edward Gallagher as HMT Cardiff Castle during World War II

Class overview
- Name: Castle class
- Operators: Royal Navy; Royal Canadian Navy; Royal New Zealand Navy; Kriegsmarine; United States Navy
- Completed: about 280

General characteristics (standard ships)
- Type: Minesweeper/naval trawler
- Tonnage: 285 GRT
- Displacement: 360 tons standard; 547 tons fully loaded
- Length: 134 ft (41 m) LOA; 125.5 ft (38.3 m)
- Beam: 23.5 ft (7.2 m)
- Draught: 12.7 ft (3.9 m)
- Propulsion: 1 vertical triple expansion reciprocating engine, 1 boiler, 1 shaft, 480 ihp (360 kW)
- Speed: 10.5 knots (19.4 km/h; 12.1 mph)
- Complement: 15, up to 18 with wireless
- Armament: Most armed with 76 mm (3 in) 12-pounder gun; George Harris, Thomas Bartlett, John Bomkworth 57 mm 6-pounder gun; Giovonni Guinti QF 4 in (102 mm) naval gun

The Castle-class minesweeper was a highly seaworthy naval trawler adapted for patrol, anti-submarine warfare and minesweeping duties and built to Admiralty specifications. Altogether 197 were built in the United Kingdom between 1916 and 1919, with others built in Canada, India and later New Zealand. Many saw service in the Second World War.

== First World War ==
The Castle class originated with the commercial trawler Raglan Castle of 1915, taken up for Royal Navy service. The design was adapted by Smith's Dock Company Ltd to Admiralty requirements for building in quantity.

During World War I, 145 were built in the United Kingdom for the Admiralty. The names of the vessels were derived from the official crew rosters of ships at the Battle of Trafalgar. Non-standard ships included in the class varied between 236 GRT and 276 GRT, with dimensions varying between 35.8 and 38.3 m (117 and 126 ft) length and 6.71 and 7.17 m (22.0 and 23.5 ft) beam. The first standard vessel, Nathaniel Cole, was delivered in May 1917. After the war 52 further ships on order were completed as fishing vessels and many of the minesweepers were converted for commercial use. 20 ships were also cancelled, but many were completed by the shipbuilders for commercial owners.

The Admiralty also ordered 60 Castle-class trawlers from Canadian shipyards, the TR series, which were loaned to the Royal Canadian Navy for seaward defence of the east coast of Canada. Some entered service with the United States Navy. Nine ships were also built in India with teak planking on steel frames.

== Second World War ==
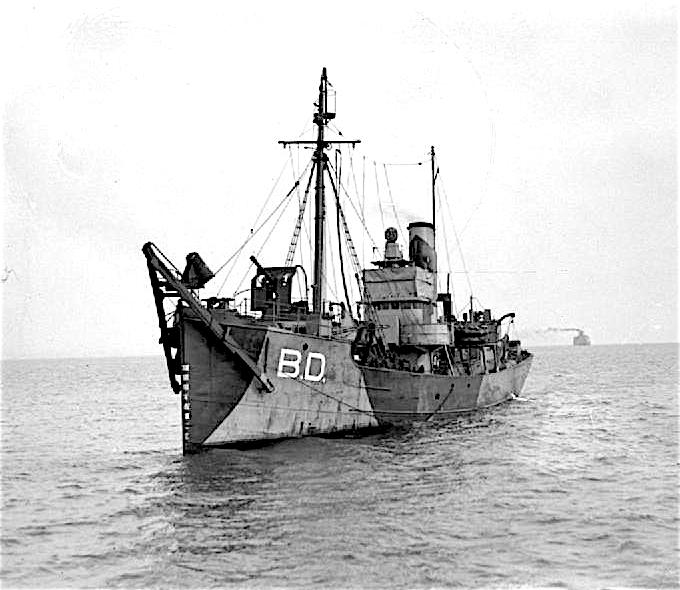
HMT Thomas Alexander as HMT Ben Dearg during World War II

Many Castle-class trawlers were among the civilian trawlers requisitioned by the Royal Navy for use in World War II. The majority were employed as minesweepers, with others serving as auxiliary patrol vessels, boom defense vessels, danlayers, Essos (fuel carriers), torpedo recovery vessels and water carriers. Many had multiple roles over the course of the war. After the end of the war, most of those that had survived were either sold or returned to their owners.

=== German captured ===
Early in World War II, ten Canadian-built trawlers that had been sold into commercial service after World War I with a number of European countries were captured by the Germans when they overran France, Belgium and Norway and put in Kriegsmarine service.

=== New Zealand additions ===
In 1940, the New Zealand Government, facing a requirement for minesweepers to operate in home waters, directed the building of 13 Castle-class naval trawlers in New Zealand to add to the two vessels, James Cosgrove and Wakakura, they had previously purchased. The Castle-class design was chosen over more modern alternatives because it was simple enough to be built with the country's limited ship construction facilities.

== Ships in class ==
=== Non-standard ===
Ship	Builder	Launched	Completed	Fate	Second World War	Second World War Loss
Daniel Harrington (FY3505)	Smiths Dock	8 February 1917	April 1917	Sold 1920	Lucienne Jeanne (FY1769)	Mined 24 October 1941 in the Thames estuary
Daniel Henley (FY3503)	Smiths Dock	24 January 1917	March 1917	Sold 4 May 1920	Kilgerran Castle	2 December 1940 bombed south of Cobh at 51.21N, 08.35W.
Festing Grindall (FY3501)	Smiths Dock	9 January 1917	March 1917	Sold 11 May 1920, wrecked 4 October 1928.		
George Aunger (FY3611)	Cook, Welton & Gemmell	20 September 1917	January 1918	Sold 1922. Wrecked 1930 May Isl., Firth of Forth		
Hugh Black (FY3602)	Cook, Welton & Gemmell	10 May 1917	August 1917	Sold 1923. Wrecked 1950 off Iceland	Ogano (FY803)	
James Berry (FY3603)	Cook, Welton & Gemmell	10 May 1917	August 1917	Sold 1922. Scrapped 1953 at Granton	Montamo (4.171)	
James Hunniford (FY3504)	Smiths Dock	24 January 1917	March 1917	Sold 1920	Ethel Taylor	Mined 22 November 1940 off the Tyne
James Johnson (FY3506)	Smiths Dock	8 February 1917	April 1917	Sold 1922		1941 mined and sunk 4 nmi (7.4 km; 4.6 mi) from Spurn Point
John Anderson (FY3610)	Cook, Welton & Gemmell	20 September 1917	December 1917	Sold 1922. Scrapped 1957 at Barrow	Charles Doran (FY597)	
John Brennan (FY3609)	Cook, Welton & Gemmell	4 September 1917	January 1918	Sold 1922. Foundered 1956 off Faeroe Islands	Osako (FY580)	
John Brice (FY3608)	Cook, Welton & Gemmell	22 August 1917	January 1918	Sold 1924. Scrapped 1952 at Grays	Beaulne Verneuil	
John Brooker (FY3605)	Cook, Welton & Gemmell	9 June 1917	December 1917	Sold 1921. Scrapped 1962	Loch Park (FY1835)	
John Burlingham (FY3600)	Cook, Welton & Gemmell	21 April 1917	July 1917	Sold 1920. Scrapped 1961 at Krimpen	Rehearo (FY1794)	
John Gillman (FY3502)	Smiths Dock	9 January 1917	March 1917	Sold 1920. Scrapped 1955		
Richard Bagley (FY3604)	Cook, Welton & Gemmell	9 June 1917	September 1917	Sold 1921. Scrapped 1954	Malacolite (FY796)	
Robert Betson (FY3601)	Cook, Welton & Gemmell	21 April 1917	July 1917	Sold 1920	Remillo	Mined 27 February 1941 in the Humber
Thomas Blackthorn (FY3606)	Cook, Welton & Gemmell	7 July 1917	December 1917	Loaned to United States Navy 1919, sold 1922, wrecked 1923 Buckton Cliff, Filey		
Thomas Buckley (FY3607)	Cook, Welton & Gemmell	7 July 1917	December 1917	Loaned to United States Navy 1919, sold 1922. Scrapped 1960 at Charlestown	Ceylonite (FY1853)	

=== Standard ===
Ship	Builder	Launched	Completed	Fate	Second World War	WWII Loss
Alexander Palmer (FY3517)	Smiths Dock	21 May 1917	June 1917	Sold 1922 to Spain. Shelled and sunk at Málaga by Almirante Cervera (Spanish Navy) 9 October 1936.		
Alexander Scott (FY3530)	Smiths Dock	3 August 1917	September 1917	Sold 4 May 1920. Scrapped 1956 at Milford Haven	Alexander Scott (FY515)	
Andrew Anderson (FY4405)	Cook, Welton & Gemmell	15 August 1919	April 1920	Completed as fishing vessel, sold 13 February 1922, wrecked 1949 near Castillo de San Sebastian		
Andrew Apsley (FY4298)	Cook, Welton & Gemmell	2 June 1919	December 1919	Completed as fishing vessel, sold 13 October 1919	Milford Earl	Bombed 8 December 1941 off east coast of Scotland
Andrew Sack (FY3523)	Smiths Dock	5 July 1917	August 1917	Sold 1924. Not in LR 1959.	North Ness (4.100)	
Arthur Cavanagh (FY3677)	Bow McLachlan	8 May 1918	28 May 1918	Sold 1925. Scrapped 1962	Arthur Cavenagh (FY566)	
Arthur Lessimore (FY3510)	Smiths Dock	9 March 1917	May 1917	Sold 1924	Irvana (FY663)	Bombed 16 January 1942 off Great Yarmouth
Benjamin Cooke (FY3667)	Bow McLachlan	October 2017	1 November 1917	Sold 1922. Scrapped 1953 at Barrow-in-Furness	Namur	
Benjamin Stevenson (FY3522)	Smiths Dock	19 June 1917	July 1917	Sunk 18 August 1917 by gunfire 40 mi (64 km) east of Fetlar, Shetlands		
Charles Antram (FY4401)	Cook, Welton & Gemmell	18 June 1919	February 1920	Completed as fishing vessel, sold 1922, scrapped 1959 at Troon.	Flanders (FY600)	
Charles Boyes (FY3593)	Cook, Welton & Gemmell	1 October 1917	June 1918	Sold 1921	Charles Boyes (FY3677)	Mined 25 May 1940 in the North Sea
Charles Chappell (FY3662)	Bow McLachlan	19 June 1917	July 1917	Sold 1922 to Greek owners as S.Nicola, later Nikolaos L. Captured by German Navy April 1941	11.V.2 – German	Wrecked 24 September 1941 at Myrina, Lemnos Island.
Charles Donelly (FY3679)	Bow McLachlan	28 June 1918	12 July 1918	Sold 4 May 1920. Scrapped 1953 in Glasgow.	Pelagos (4.103)	
Charles Legg (FY4213)	J P Rennoldson	19 November 1918	20 January 1919	Sold 1923. Scrapped 1959	Milford Countess (FY564)	
Daniel Clowden (FY4446)	George Brown	13 November 1919	13 November 1919	Completed as fishing vessel, sold 8 August 1919. Scrapped 1952.	Daniel Clowden (FY531)	
Daniel Dick (FY4488)	J P Rennoldson	17 May 1920	25 August 1920	Completed as fishing vessel, sold 1921. Scrapped 1955.	Clyth Ness (FY1596)	
Daniel Leary (FY4221)	C Rennoldson	30 July 1919	9 July 1920	Completed as fishing vessel, sold 1923, wrecked 1934 and scrapped.		
David Dillon (FY4484)	J P Rennoldson	May 2019	28 July 1919	Completed as fishing vessel, sold 28 July 1919, scrapped 1958	Edward Walmsley (FY624)	
David Ogilvie (FY3514)	Smiths Dock	7 May 1917	June 1917	Sold 1919. Not in LR 1951.	David Ogilvie (FY720)	
Denis Casey (FY3711)	Ailsa	13 December 1917	19/03/1918	Sold July 1920. Wrecked 1926 in Galway Bay.		
Dominick Addison (FY4296)	Cook, Welton & Gemmell	2 April 1919	November 1919	Completed as fishing vessel, sold 1919. Scrapped 1960 at Boom.	Gadfly (FY517)	
Dominick Dubine (FY3726)	J P Rennoldson	14 March 1918	15 May 1918	Sold 4 May 1920. Scrapped 1952 at Dieppe.	Fructidor (AD52) – French	
Domque Gentile (FY3793)	Ailsa	5 August 1918	October 1918	Sold 1921, believed scrapped 1978	Santiago Rusiñol – Spanish	
Edward Cattelly (FY4459)	Ailsa	17 March 1919	May 1919	Completed as fishing vessel, sold 1919	Loch Naver	Lost 6 May 1940 in collision off Hartlepool
Edward Collingwood (FY3675)	Bow McLachlan	9 April 1918	26 April 1918	Sold 1922. Scrapped 1953.	T.R. Ferrens (FY532)	
Edward Gallagher (FY4216)	C Rennoldson	14 February 1919	August 1919	Completed as fishing vessel Ebor Downs, sold 1919, scrapped 1958 at Dublin	Cardiff Castle (FY512)	
Egilias Akerman (FY4294)	Cook, Welton & Gemmell	18 March 1919	November 1919	Completed as fishing vessel, sold 1919	Computator (FY635)	Sunk 21 January 1945 in collision with HMS Vanoc off Normandy
Emmanuel Camelaire (FY3717)	Ailsa	25 April 1918	May 1918	Sold 1921, Scrapped 1957 at Milford Haven.	Brabant (FY586)	
Francis Conlin (FY4458)	Ailsa	21 January 1919	March 1919	Completed as fishing vessel Inverythan, sold 1919, scrapped 1978 in Greece	Miranda – Greek	
Frederick Bush (FY3594)	Cook, Welton & Gemmell	14 March 1918	June 1918	Sold 1922, foundered east of Ireland on 1 November 1928.		
George Adgell (FY4402)	Cook, Welton & Gemmell	18 June 1919	January 1920	Completed as fishing vessel, sold 1920, scrapped 1953 at Preston.	George Adgell (FY1926)	
George Aiken (FY4291)	Cook, Welton & Gemmell	19 December 1918	August 1920	Completed as fishing vessel, sold 1919, scrapped 1971 in Spain	Santa Urbana – Spanish	
George Clarke (FY3714)	J P Rennoldson	2 October 1917	December 1917	Loaned to United States Navy 1919, sold 1923, scrapped 1960 at Charlestown.	Lady Stanley (4.233)	
George Cochran (FY3721)	Cook, Welton & Gemmell	28 June 1918	December 1918	Loaned to United States Navy 1919, sold 1920, went missing at sea 1929		
George Corten (FY3697)	Cox & Co	1918	6 February 1919	Sold 1921	Northcoates (FY548)	Sank 2 December 1944 during a storm while under tow off Littlehampton
George Cousins (FY4461)	Ailsa	13 June 1919	August 1919	Completed as fishing vessel, sold 1919, scrapped 1956.	George Cousins (FY627)	
George Darby (FY3681)	Bow McLachlan	24 September 1918	21 October 1918	Sold 1923, sold for breaking up 1967 – also reported as wrecked 1968.	Guimera – Spanish	
George Greaves (FY3790)	George Brown	1919	12 May 1919	Completed as fishing vessel, sold 1919	Raglan Castle (FY631)	
George Greenfield (FY3787)	George Brown	11 September 1918	15 October 1918	Sold 1921. Lost off Sisargas Islands, Spain 1947.	Pacifico – Spanish	
George Harris (FY3854)	Hepple & Co	20 September 1918	12 December 1918	Sold 11 May 1920. Scrapped 1955 at Bombay.	Laxmii (Royal Indian Navy)	
Giovanni Guinti (FY3792)	Ailsa	31 May 1918	July 1918	Sold 1920. Wrecked 1937 off Iceland.		
Griffith Griffith (FY3780)	Cook, Welton & Gemmell	27 August 1918	March 1919	Sold 11 May 1920, foundered near Badagara, India in 1925.		
Henry Chevallier (FY3673)	Bow McLachlan	13 March 1918	3 April 1918	Sold 1922. Scrapped at Bo'ness 1958.	Ligny (FY1765)	
Henry Cory (FY3698)	Cox & Co	1919	28 May 1919	Completed as fishing vessel, sold 1919, scrapped 1959.	Caliban (FY803)	
Isaac Arthan (FY4297)	Cook, Welton & Gemmell	1 May 1919	January 1920	Completed as fishing vessel, sold 1921, scrapped 1959 at Boom.	Loch Buie (FY688)	
Isaac Heath (FY3829)	J P Rennoldson	9 July 1918	21 August 1918	Sold 1920, scrapped 1958.	Teroma (FY527)	
James Burgess (FY3653)	C Rennoldson	31 August 1917	October 1917	Sold 1920. Scrapped 1956 at Briton Ferry.	Beaumaris Castle (FY993)	
James Cepell (FY3718)	George Brown	29 March 1918	May 1918	Sold 1925, wrecked 1952 near Ouessant.	Antioche II (AD285) – French	
James Chapman (FY3694)	George Brown	8 September 1917	November 1917	Sold 1923, Wrecked 1966 at Salvora Island	Oceano Atlantico – Spanish	
James Christopher (FY3715)	J P Rennoldson	14 January 1918	27 March 1918	Sold 1923	Marsona (FY714)	Mined 4 August 1940 off Cromarty
James Connor (FY3700)	Harkness	19 July 1917	October 1917	Sold 1922 to Spain. Shelled and sunk at Málaga by Almirante Cervera (Spanish Navy) 9 October 1936.		
James Cosgrove (FY3716)	Ailsa	5 March 1918	April 1918	Sold 1919. Scuttled 1952.	James Cosgrove (RNZN)	
James Dinton (FY3678)	Bow McLachlan	10 May 1918	29 May 1918	Sold 1922. Scrapped 1959.	Milford Duke (Z125)	
James Gill (FY4217)	C Rennoldson	17 February 1919	November 1919	Completed as fishing vessel, sold 1919, scrapped 1954 at Dublin.	Milford Duchess (FY613)	
James Green (FY3537)	Smiths Dock	3 October 1917	November 1917	Sold 1922. Scrapped 1947 at London.	Laverock	
James Laveney (FY4215)	Chambers	1919	30 October 1919	Completed as fishing vessel, sold 1925. Scrapped 1952.	La Blanche II (AD186) – French	
James Lay (FY4222)	Fletcher & Fearnall	1918	4 November 1918	Sold 1920. Scrapped 1960.	James Lay (FY667)	
James Peake (FY3540)	Smiths Dock	17 October 1917	November 1917	Sold 1923, wrecked 1935 at Speeton.		
James Pond (FY3515)	Smiths Dock	21 May 1917	June 1917	Sunk 15 February 1918 by German destroyers in the Dover Straits		
James Robertson (FY3159)	Smiths Dock	6 June 1917	July 1917	Sold 1922. Scrapped 1960 at Barrow.	Capstone (FY1555)	
James Seckar (FY3526)	Smiths Dock	20 July 1917	August 1917	Foundered 25 September 1917 in the Atlantic, last seen at 46°30′N 12°00′W		
James Sibbald (FY3525)	Smiths Dock	20 July 1917	August 1917	Sold 1919. Scrapped 1957 at Milford Haven.	Our Bairns (FY1566)	
John Aikenhead (FY4292)	Cook, Welton & Gemmell	19 December 1918	November 1919	Completed as fishing vessel, sold 1919	Polly Johnson	Bombed 29 May 1940 off Dunkirk
John Ashley (FY4293)	Cook, Welton & Gemmell	18 March 1919	November 1919	Completed as fishing vessel, sold 1919, scrapped at Gateshead 1952.		
John Baptish (FY3596)	Cook, Welton & Gemmell	29 April 1918	July 1918	Sold 1921	John Baptish	mined Coningbeg Lightvessel 9 September 1940
John Bateman (FY3599)	Cook, Welton & Gemmell	29 April 1918	August 1918	Sold 1922. Scrapped 1964 in Spain.	Pesquerias Cantabricas No.1 – Spanish	
John Bomkworth (FY3597)	Cook, Welton & Gemmell	29 May 1918	July 1918	Sold 1922 to Spain. Wrecked 24 December 1930.		
John Bullock (FY3651)	C Rennoldson	9 July 1917	September 1917	Sold 1921. Wrecked 1947 Fladda Island.	Flying Admiral	
John Campbell (FY3695)	George Brown	1 November 1917	December 1917	Sold 1923. Wrecked 1925 on Tory Island.		
John Casewell (FY3713)	Ailsa	3 October 1917	November 1917	Sold 4 May 1920. Wrecked 1921 Castletownbere, Cork.		
John Cattling (FY3676)	Bow McLachlan	12 April 1918	29 April 1918	Sold 4 May 1920. Scrapped 1957 at Hamburg.	John Cattling (FY536)	
John Chivers (FY3671)	Bow McLachlan	17 December 1917	December 1917	Sold 1922 to Spain, scrapped 1971.		
John Church (FY3668)	Bow McLachlan	16 October 1917	November 1917	Sold 1920. Deleted 1962.	Txit-Ona - Spanish	
John Clavell (FY4480)	Hepple & Co	14 August 1919	18 October 1920	Completed as fishing vessel, sold 1921, 1977	Denis	
John Collins (FY3712)	Ailsa	19 November 1917	December 1917	Loaned to United States Navy 1919, sold 1920, scrapped 1963 in Suez.		
John Cooper (FY3699)	Harkness	5 July 1917	September 1917	Sold 1922	Permartin Secondo	Sank in collision 3 January 1944
John Davis (FY3682)	Bow McLachlan	25 September 1918	22 October 1918	Sold 1922. Wrecked Skirza Head 1939.		
John Dormond (FY4485)	J P Rennoldson	August 1919	15 October 1919	Completed as fishing vessel, sold 1922, foundered off Scotland 1927.		
John Gauntlet (FY3779)	C Rennoldson	12 August 1918	March 1919	Sold 11 May 1920, wrecked Malindi, India 1922.		
John Geoghan (FY3794)	Cook, Welton & Gemmell	9 October 1918	November 1918	Sold 1921, scrapped Milford Haven 1957.	Congre (AD92) – French	
John Graham (FY3778)	Ailsa	27 July 1918	January 1919	Loaned to USN 1919, sold 1921, scrapped 1955 at Troon.	Eastcoates (FY1771)	
John Gregory (FY3789)	George Brown	14 February 1919	2 May 1919	Completed as fishing vessel, sold 1919, scrapped 1954.	Nadine (AD57) – French	
John Gulipster (FY3782)	Cook, Welton & Gemmell	24 September 1918	April 1919	Completed as fishing vessel, sold 1919, scrapped 1956 at Ghent.	Comitatus (FY633)	
John Kidd (FY3508)	Smith's Dock Co	20 February 1917	May 1917	Sold 11 May 1920, deleted from LR 1950.	Rotherslade (FY1822)	
John Lewis (FY4219)	C Rennoldson	1919	30 March 1920	Completed as fishing vessel, sold 1921, scrapped 1955.	Harry Melling (FY538)	
John Lyons (FY3511)	Smiths Dock	23 March 1917	May 1917	Sold 1922. Not in LR 1951.	Les Illattes – French	
John Pollard (FY3516)	Smiths Dock	21 May 1917	June 1917	Sold 4 May 1920, scrapped 1956 at Briton Ferry.	Grosmont Castle	
John Thorling (FY3527)	Smiths Dock	20 July 1917	September 1917	Sold 1925, scrapped 1959 at Rotterdam.	Concertator (FY637)	
Joseph Barratt (FY3586)	Cook, Welton & Gemmell	2 November 1917	March 1918	Sold 1920	Tilbury Ness	Bombed 1 November 1940 in the Thames estuary
Joseph Button (FY3584)	Cook, Welton & Gemmell	17 December 1917	April 1918	Sold 1920	Joseph Button	Mined 22 Oct 1940 off Aldeburgh
Joseph Connell (FY3696)	George Brown	20 December 1917	February 1918	Sold 1922, wrecked 1931 east of Cape Clear Lighthouse.		
Joseph Giddice (FY3786)	George Brown	24 October 1918	12 December 1918	Sold 1922, scrapped 1952 at Monmouthshire.		
Joseph Gordon (FY3785)	George Brown	29 June 1918	August 1918	Sold 1922. Scrapped 1952.	Grouin Du Cou (AD276)- French	
Joseph Hodgkins (FY3855)	Hepple & Co	18 December 1918	20 June 1919	Completed as fishing vessel, sold 1919, sank 1921 off Isle of Man.		
Joshua Arabin (FY4299)	Cook, Welton & Gemmell	1 May 1919	October 1919	Completed as fishing vessel, sold 1920, scrapped at Milford Haven 1957.	De La Pole (FY558)	
Matthew Cassady (FY4457)	Ailsa	18 December 1918	February 1919,	Completed as fishing vessel Inverdon, sold 1919, wrecked 6 December 1926 at Sandoe.		
Matthew Flynn (FY3745)	Hepple & Co	17 October 1917	23 February 1918	Sold 1921, sunk as target in Australia 1953.	Commiles (FY636)	
Michael Ging (FY3784)	George Brown	11 May 1918	June 1918	Sold 1922, wrecked at Arringa 1927.		
Michael Griffith (FY3781)	Cook, Welton & Gemmell	5 September 1918	April 1919	Sold 1921, wrecked 7nm S Barra Head 1953.	Michael Griffith (FY567)	
Michael Maloney (FY3513)	Smiths Dock	7 May 1917	June 1917	Stranded 19 February 1920 at Egersundl, Norway		
Morgan Jones (FY3845)	Fletcher & Fearnall	10 March 1918	March 1918	Sold 1920, scrapped 1957 at Troon.	Morgan Jones (4.114)	
Nathaniel Cole (FY3507)	Smiths Dock	20 February 1917	May 1917	Foundered 6 February 1918 off Buncrana, Lough Swilly		
Neil Smith (FY3524)	Smiths Dock	5 July 1917	August 1917	Sold 1921, scrapped 1956 at Dublin.	Neil Smith (FY529)	
Oliver Pickin (FY3518)	Smiths Dock	21 May 1917	July 1917	Sold 1922, scrapped 1956.	Damito (FY521)	
Patrick Bowe (FY3591)	Cook, Welton & Gemmell	17 January 1918	May 1918	Sold 1922 to Spain. Wrecked Arosa Bay 1 September 1931.		
Patrick Cullen (FY4460)	Ailsa	31 March 1919	June 1919	Completed as fishing vessel, sold 1919, wrecked 1928 at St Kilda.		
Patrick Donovan (FY4487)	J P Rennoldson	20 February 1920	20 June 1920	Completed as fishing vessel, sold 1922, wrecked 1934 off Grimsby.		
Peter Blumberry (FY3583)	Cook, Welton & Gemmell	18 October 1917	February 1918	Sold 1921, lost in explosion off Dingle 1933.		
Peter Carey (FY4445)	George Brown	25 June 1919	October 1919	Completed as fishing vessel, sold 1919, scrapped 1959.	Peter Carey (FY537)	
Peter Hall (FY3795)	Ailsa	6 November 1918	December 1918	Sold 1922, scrapped 1954 at Barrow-in-Furness.	Alvis (FY4118)	
Peter Killen (FY4207)	Duthie Torry	1919	31 March 1919	Completed as fishing vessel, sold 1919, scrapped 1957 at Charlestown.	Sir John Lister (FY622)	
Peter Lovett (FY3509)	Smiths Dock	9 March 1917	May 1917	Sold 1922		Sank off Tod Head 19 May 1940
Philip Godby (FY3783)	Cook, Welton & Gemmell	24 September 1918	May 1919	Completed as fishing vessel, sold 1919	Togimo	Sunk 11 February 1940 by gunfire from U-47 west of Cornwall
Phineas Beard (FY3588)	Cook, Welton & Gemmell	17 November 1917	March 1918	Sold 1920	Phineas Beard	Bombed 8 December 1941 off Lunan Bay
Richard Bacon (FY3587)	Cook, Welton & Gemmell	2 November 1917	March 1918	Sold 1922, scrapped 1954 at Milford Haven.	Commodator (FY634)	
Richard Crofts (FY3720)	Cook, Welton & Gemmell	13 June 1918	December 1918	Sold 1921. Wrecked 20 Feb 1953 at Cornaig Beg.	Richard Crofts (FY530)	
Richard Cundy (FY4462)	Ailsa	12 August 1919	October 1919	Completed as fishing vessel, sold 1920	River Clyde	Mined 5 August 1940 off Aldeburgh
Richard Roberts (FY3520)	Smiths Dock	6 June 1917	July 1917	Sold 11 May 1920, wrecked near Touriñan 29 July 1922.		
Robert Bowen (FY3595)	Cook, Welton & Gemmell	14 March 1918	July 1918	Sold 1920	Robert Bowen	Bombed 9 February 1940 off Aberdeen
Robert Cloughton (FY3672)	Bow McLachlan	18 December 1917	December 1917	Boom defence vessel Coronet 1933, Scrapped 1953 at Northam.		
Robert Davidson (FY3725)	C Rennoldson	30 November 1917	January 1918	Sold 1921	Inasi - Spanish	
Samuel Dawson (FY4486)	J P Rennoldson	24 November 1919	5 February 1920	Completed as fishing vessel, sold 1922	Sotirios - Greek	Sunk April 1941 by German aircraft in North Evoicos.
Samuel Drake (FY3683)	Bow McLachlan	5 November 1918	26 November 1918	Sold 1924. Scrapped 1946 at Paull.	Southcoates (4.140)	
Samuel Green (FY3791)	George Brown	30 April 1919	July 1919	Completed as fishing vessel, sold 1919 and converted to yacht; used as floating restaurant Cruz at Leith. Was "abandoned" from 2007 to 2018, restored into a 1920s style luxury hotel and renamed to Ocean Mist, permanently docked at 14 The Shore, Leith.	Ocean Rover	
Samuel Spencer (FY3533)	Smiths Dock	17 September 1917	October 1917	Sold 1921, Not in 1950 LR.	Pen-Men - French	
Siam Duffy (FY3684)	Bow McLachlan	6 November 1918	27 November 1918	Loaned to United States Navy 1919, sold 1922	Fontenoy	Bombed 19 November 1940 off Lowestoft
Thomas Adney (FY4295)	Cook, Welton & Gemmell	2 April 1919	November 1919	Completed as fishing vessel, sold 1919, went missing at sea 3 September 1920		
Thomas Alexander (FY4404)	Cook, Welton & Gemmell	18 July 1919	June 1920	Completed as fishing vessel, sold 1920, scuttled 1956 off Albany, Washington.	Ben Dearg (FY690)	
Thomas Allen (FY4403)	Cook, Welton & Gemmell	18 July 1919	March 1920	Completed as fishing vessel, sold 1922, scrapped 1963 at Hamburg.	Milford Prince (FY614)	
Thomas Altoft (FY4300)	Cook, Welton & Gemmell	2 June 1919	January 1920	Completed as fishing vessel, sold 1920, wrecked Glas Island, Scalpay 8 November 1947.	Thomas Altoft (FY552)	
Thomas Bartlett (FY3598)	Cook, Welton & Gemmell	29 May 1918	August 1918	Sold 11 May 1920	Thomas Bartlett (FY553)	Mined 28 May 1940 off Calais
Thomas Booth (FY3592)	Cook, Welton & Gemmell	14 February 1918	June 1918	Sold 1920. Scrapped 1955 at Milford Haven.		
Thomas Boudige (FY4406)	Cook, Welton & Gemmell	15 August 1919	August 1920	Completed as fishing vessel, sold 1921, scrapped 1956 at Dublin.	Darnett Ness (FY542)	
Thomas Chambers (FY3670)	Bow McLachlan	1 December 1917	December 1917	Sold 1922. Scrapped 1959 at Bruges.	Lorraine (4.170)	
Thomas Connolly (FY3589)	Cook, Welton & Gemmell	29 November 1917	April 1918	Sold 1920	Thomas Connolly (Z141)	Mined 17 December 1940 off Sheerness
Thomas Crofton (FY3661)	Bow McLachlan	18 June 1917	July 1917	Sold 4 May 1920. Scrapped 1946.	Gwmaho (Z135)	
Thomas Daniels (FY3680)	Bow McLachlan	10 July 1918	12 August 1918	Sold 1922. Wrecked 1 March 1927 Cairns of Coll.		
Thomas Dowding (FY3724)	C Rennoldson	16 November 1917	December 1917	Sold 1923. Scrapped 1953.	Ben Bheulah (FY1681)	
Thomas Goble (FY3539)	Smiths Dock	17 October 1917	November 1917	Sold 1922. Scrapped 1959.	Cotsmuir (FY550)	
Thomas Green (FY4218)	C Rennoldson	28 May 1919	January 1920	Completed as fishing vessel, sold 1920	Caerphilly Castle	Sunk by enemy aircraft 27 January 1941 off western Ireland.
Thomas Hankins (FY3828)	J P Rennoldson	10 May 1918	19/06/1918	Sold 11 May 1920.		Sunk 20 November 1939 by U-33 14 mi (23 km) northwest of Tory Island
Thomas Laundry (FY4212)	J P Rennoldson	21 October 1918	27 November 1918	Loaned to United States Navy 1919, sold 11 May 1920	B.R.Lothe - Norwegian	Stranded 3 March 1944 off Mørekysten, Norway.
Thomas Lawrie (FY4214)	Chambers	1919	1 October 1919	Completed as fishing vessel, sold 1925	Les Barges II - French	Sunk 21 November 1939 by U-41 west of France.
Thomas Leeds (FY4210)	Duthie Torry	June 1919	12 September 1919	Completed as fishing vessel, sold 1919, wrecked 20 October 1955 near Ten Mile Beacon, Lagos.	Thomas Leeds (FY520)	
Thomas Robins (FY3531)	Smiths Dock	3 September 1917	September 1917	Sold 4 May 1920, wrecked 19 November 1938 Westray Sound, Orkney Island.		
Thomas Twiney (FY3528)	Smiths Dock	20 July 1917	September 1917	Sold 1922, wrecked August 1935 on Powder House Rock, Culzean Bay.		
Timothy Crawley (FY3710)	Ailsa	4 October 1917	November 1917	Sold 11 May 1920. Scrapped 1956 at Bo'ness.	Loch Long	
Valentine Bower (FY3654)	C Rennoldson	1 October 1917	November 1917	Sold 1923. Scrapped 1960.	Milford King (FY1573)	
Walter Burke (FY3532)	Smiths Dock	3 September 1917	September 1917	Sold 1922. Scrapped 1976.	Toralla - Spanish	
William Beatty (FY3534)	Smiths Dock	17 September 1917	October 1917	Sold 4 May 1920		sunk 14 November 1939 by U-41 north of Flannan Island.
William Beeton (FY3652)	C Rennoldson	20 July 1917	September 1917	To Maltese Government 1921	Apuania - Italian	
William Bell (FY3590)	Cook, Welton & Gemmell	17 January 1918	May 1918	Sold 1920. Scrapped 1946 at Troon.	William Bell (FY1727)	
William Brady (FY3585)	Cook, Welton & Gemmell	17 December 1917	May 1918	Sold 1920. Scrapped 1960 at Gateshead.	William Brady (4.112)	
William Browis (FY3582)	Cook, Welton & Gemmell	18 October 1917	January 1918	Sold 1922. Scrapped 1960 at St Davids.	Milford Queen (FY615)	
William Bunce (FY3538)	Smiths Dock	3 October 1917	November 1917	Sold 1920. Scrapped 1956.	William Bunce	
William Caldwell (FY3719)	Cook, Welton & Gemmell	12 June 1918	November 1918	Loaned to USN 1919, sold 11 May 1920. Scrapped 1957 at Granton.	William Caldwell (Z142)	
William Cale (FY3666)	Bow McLachlan	19 September 1917	October 1917	Sold 1922. Scrapped 1955 at Troon.	William Cale (FY535)	
William Carberry (FY4479)	Hepple & Co	28 June 1919	13 December 1919	Completed as fishing vessel, sold 1919. Wrecked 1935 off River Muros.		
William Carr (FY3674)	Bow McLachlan	15 March 1918	4 April 1918	Sold 1921	Nazareth (FY1815)	
William Carrick (FY3665)	Bow McLachlan	18 September 1917	October 1917	To Indian Government 1920		
William Chaseman (FY3529)	Smiths Dock	3 August 1917	September 1917	Sold 4 May 1920. Scrapped 1947.	Radnor Castle (FY511)	
William Coburne (FY3664)	Bow McLachlan	24 July 1917	August 1917	Sold 1920. Foundered 1928 off Slyne Head.		
William Cowling (FY3663)	Bow McLachlan	23 July 1917	August 1917	Sold 1922	Notre Dame De Laghet (FL 08) - German Navy	War loss September 1943.
William Cummins (FY3669)	Bow McLachlan	17 November 1917	November 1917	Sold 1925. Scrapped 1957.	Niblick	
William Darnold (FY3722)	Cook, Welton & Gemmell	11 July 1918	December 1918	Loaned to United States Navy 1919, sold 11 May 1920, wrecked 4 October 1924 off Birsay, Orkney Islands		
William Downes (FY3723)	C Rennoldson	5 November 1917	December 1917	Sold 1921.		Foundered 16 September 1941 off Rosslare.
William Drake (FY4483)	J P Rennoldson	1919	19 May 1919	Completed as fishing vessel Ebor Court, sold 1919, wrecked 1 November 1929 on Port Eynon Point.		
William Flemming (FY3746)	Hepple & Co	12 February 1918	18 May 1918	Sold 4 May 1920	Tranio (FY3526)	Bombed 26 June 1941 while under tow off Smith's Knoll
William Griffths (FY3788)	George Brown	19 November 1918	21 February 1919	Completed as fishing vessel, sold 1919, stranded 13 August 1923 in Galway Bay.		
William Hannam (FY4206)	Duthie Torry	November 1918	20 February 1919	Sold 1920, sank 1957 off Kiberg, Norway.	William Hannam (Z129)	
William Humphries (FY4205)	Duthie Torry	October 1918	24 December 1918	Sold 1921		Sunk 21 November 1939 by U-33 75 mi (121 km) northwest from Rathlin Island.
William Knight (FY4208)	Duthie Torry	April 1919	19 June 1919	Completed as fishing vessel, sold 1919	Cobbers	Bombed 3 March 1941 in the North Sea
William Lambkin (FY4209)	Duthie Torry	May 1919	16 July 1919	Completed as fishing vessel, sold 1919, scrapped 1972.	Tiburon - Spain	
William Leek (FY4211)	J P Rennoldson	August 1918	10 October 1918	Sold 11 May 1920. Scrapped 1956.	Hildina (FY541)	
William Loft (FY4220)	C Rennoldson	30 August 1919	May 1920	Completed as fishing vessel, sold 1923, scrapped 1954.	Tamora (FY643)	
William Mannell (FY3512)	Smiths Dock	23 March 1917	June 1917	Sold 11 May 1920, lost 1949 off Portaleen.	William Mannel (FY1665)	
William Spencer (FY3521)	Smiths Dock	19 June 1917	July 1917	Sold 1924. Scrapped 1960 at Fife.	Astros (Z130)	
William Symons (FY3535)	Smiths Dock	1 October 1917	October 1917	Sold 1922. Scrapped 1959 at Hemiksem.	Lephreto (FY519)	
William Wilmot (FY3536)	Smiths Dock	1 October 1917	November 1917	Sunk September 1920 in collision with SS Meissonier in the Irish Sea		

=== Cancelled ===
Ship	Builder	Fate	Second World War	WWII Loss
Alexander Colville (FY4455)	George Brown			
Alexander Dunbar (FY4493)	Hepple & Co			
Collin Craig (FY4451)	George Brown			
Ephraim Bright (FY4407)	Cook, Welton & Gemmell	Completed as fishing vessel. BU 1955.	Mai	
James Baird (FY4411)	Cook, Welton & Gemmell	Completed as fishing vessel. BU 1959.	Ijuin (FY612)	
James Boyle (FY4414)	Cook, Welton & Gemmell			
James Coile (FY4454)	George Brown			
John Benson (FY4409)	Cook, Welton & Gemmell	Completed as fishing vessel. BU 1955.	Kari Solmundarson	
John Chatway (FY4447)	George Brown			
John Coombe (FY4453)	George Brown			
John Creighton (FY4449)	George Brown			
Joseph Crowell (FY4448)	George Brown			
Joseph Doe (FY4494)	Hepple & Co			
Matthew Berryman (FY4412)	Cook, Welton & Gemmell	Completed as fishing vessel. BU 1962.	Righto (FY604)	
Richard Bane (FY4410)	Cook, Welton & Gemmell	Completed as fishing vessel. BU 1956.	Rudilais (FY528)	
Walter Cane (FY4456)	George Brown			
William Bennett (FY4408)	Cook, Welton & Gemmell	Completed as fishing vessel. BU 1952.	Njordur	
William Burte (FY4413)	Cook, Welton & Gemmell	Completed as fishing vessel. BU 1962.	Reboundo (FY602)	
William Cable (FY4450)	George Brown			
William Coran (FY4452)	George Brown			

=== Canadian-built ===
See TR series minesweeping trawler.

=== Indian-built ===
Ship	Builder	Launched	Completed	Fate
Bombay	Bombay Dockyard	21 September 1919	1919	Completed as unarmed minesweeper or fishing vessel
Calcutta	Burn & Co	1919	1919	Completed as unarmed minesweeper or fishing vessel
Colombo	Burn & Co	1919	1919	Completed as unarmed minesweeper or fishing vessel
Jubbulpore	Bombay Dockyard			Cancelled 1919
Kennery	Bombay Dockyard	1919	1919	Completed as unarmed minesweeper or fishing vessel
Kidderpore	Bombay Dockyard	1919	1919	Completed as unarmed minesweeper or fishing vessel
Madras	Burn & Co	1919	1920	Completed as unarmed minesweeper or fishing vessel
Salsette	Bombay Dockyard	1919	1919	Completed as unarmed minesweeper or fishing vessel
Sealdah	Bombay Dockyard	1919	1919	Completed as unarmed minesweeper or fishing vessel

=== New Zealand-built ===
See Castle class trawlers of the Royal New Zealand Navy.
