= SS Taiaroa (1943) =

New Zealand Navy ship

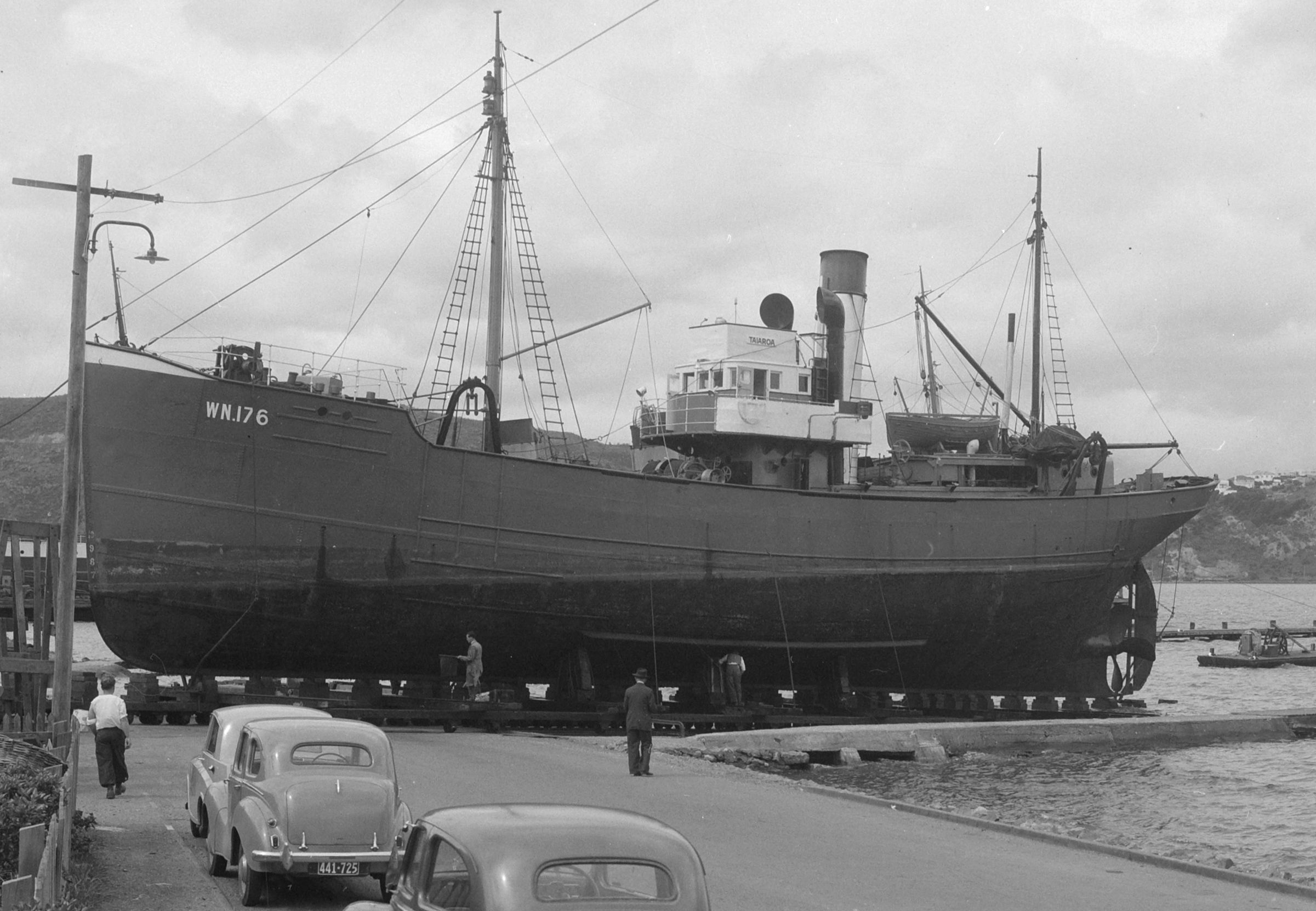
- SS Taiaroa

History

New Zealand
- Name: Waikato
- Builder: Mason Bros. Engineering Co. Ltd Auckland
- Launched: 16 October 1943
- In service: 1947
- Out of service: 1972
- Renamed: Taiaroa (1946)
- Identification: IMO number: 5348926 Pennant numbers: DN62, WN176, NR49
- Fate: Sunk by the RNZAF in 1989

General characteristics
- Class & type: Castle-class minesweeper
- Displacement: 625 tons
- Length: 135 ft (41 m)
- Beam: 23 ft (7.0 m)
- Propulsion: Single screw, triple reciprocating engine
- Speed: 10 knots (19 km/h; 12 mph)

SS Taiaroa was a New Zealand-built Castle-class ship built for the Royal New Zealand Navy during World War II with the intention for use as a minesweeper, later being converted into a fishing trawler.

== Background ==
The vessel was ordered after the New Zealand government, facing a requirement for more minesweepers to operate in home waters, chose the Castle-class design because it was simple enough to be built with the country's limited ship construction facilities at the time.

== History ==
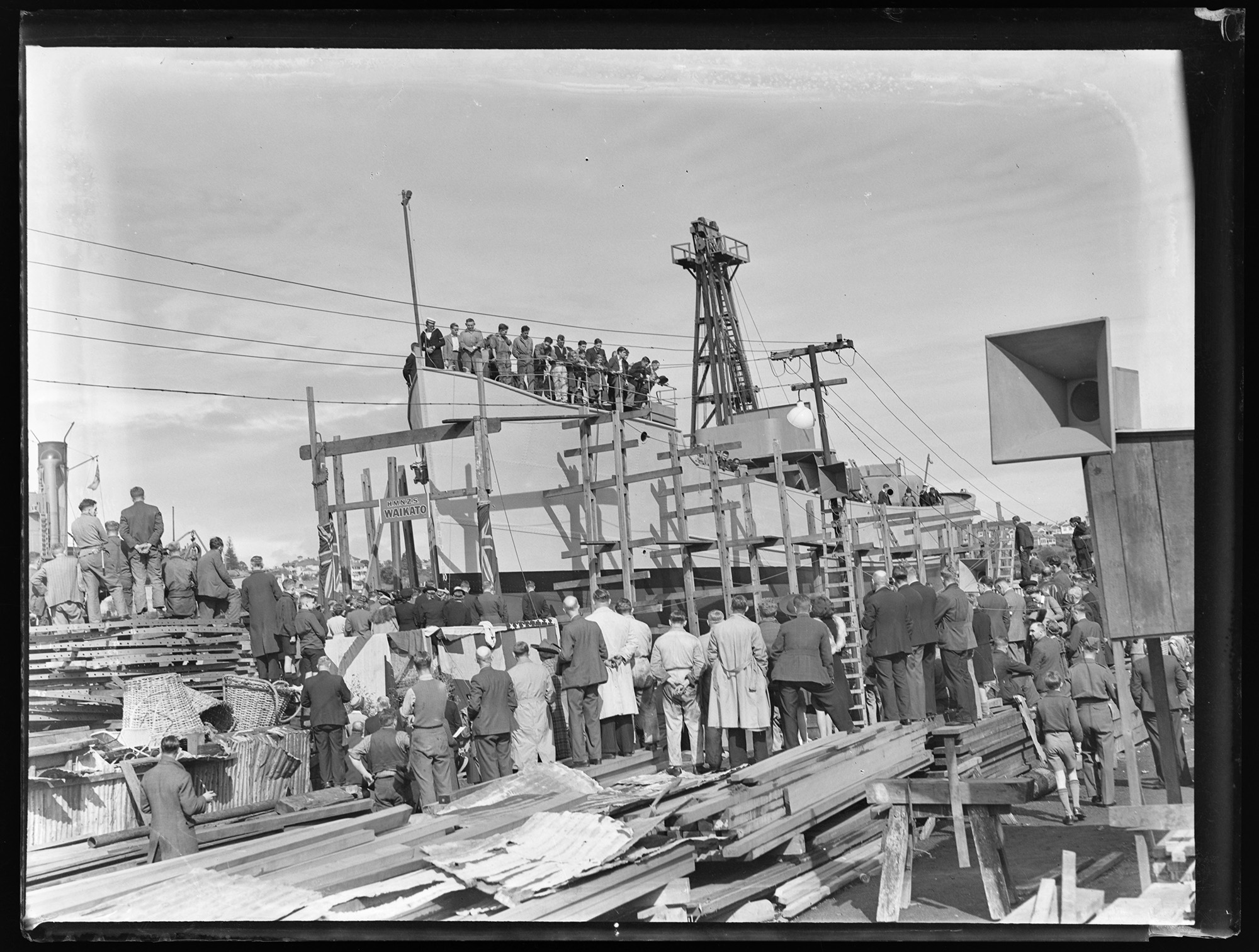
Waikato on launch day

Originally launched as HMNZS Waikato in 1943, she was planned to have been commissioned in 1944, and was to serve in the 97th Auxiliary minesweeping group. But construction would be stopped when she was 95% complete and was declared war surplus.

In 1946, she was sold to the National Mortgage and Agency Company, being renamed to Taiaroa, and was converted into a fishing trawler, and would operate at Dunedin. She would be sold to New Zealand Fisheries LTD in 1952. Later that year on 28 July 1952, a man was found dead on the deck of Taiaroa, having fallen head first. a member of the crew, Charles Munday told the police that he was walking with the man on the wharf, and while he was climbing down to the trawler, the man fell head first onto Taiaroa. Charles would report this to the fireman of Taiaroa, but because he did not see the man because of the darkness, the fireman presumed he was under the influence of liquor, told him to get off the ship. Charles would then report the accident to the police, and when the police arrived, they found the man dead. In September 1974, she was laid up in Wellington, where for almost a decade, she would be badly vandalised. In April 1982, she was sold by the Wellington Harbour Board to recover costs, and was to be used for the movie Savage Islands, and would sail to Tauranga under her own power to be converted. In one of the final scenes of the movie, she was to be blown up, which was only meant to damage deck structures, unfortunately she caught fire, also setting fire to a wildlife reserve on Motoura island. After a lengthy court case, Taiaroa was stripped, and given to the Royal New Zealand Air Force to be sunk.
