= Coastal Forces of the Royal Australian Navy =

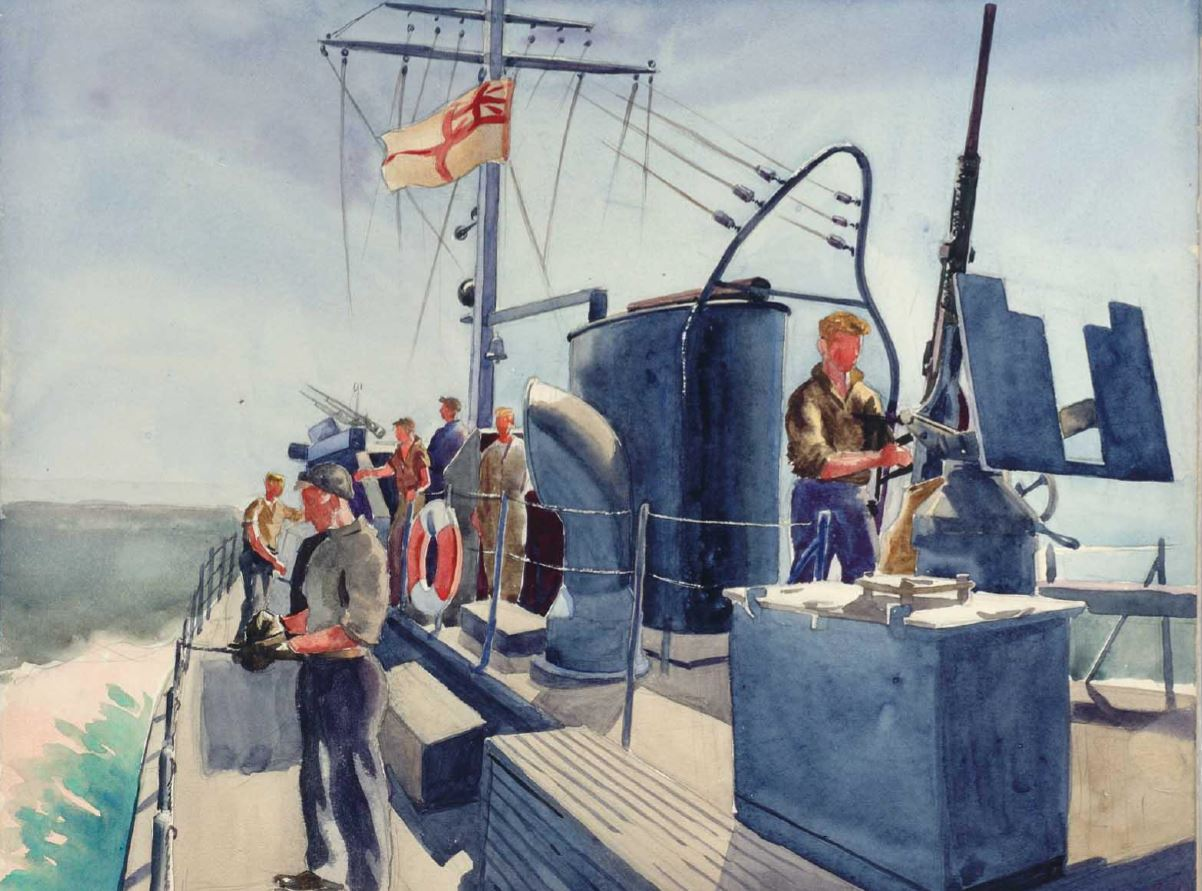
A painting by official war artist Able Seaman Rex Julius depicting the upper deck of a Fairmile launch in 1944

Coastal Forces was a division of the Royal Navy established during World War II. It consisted of small coastal defence craft such as motor launches, submarine chasers, air-sea rescue launches, motor gun boats and motor torpedo boats. It did not include minesweepers, trawlers or landing craft. This article is about the equivalent boats used by the Royal Australian Navy (RAN).

== Units and craft ==
It included the following types of coastal defence craft:

Type	Built	Lost	Notes
Harbour defence motor launch Fairmile B motor launch	31; 35	2	

31 harbour defence motor launches (HDMLs) and 35 Fairmile B motor launches entered service from October 1942. They were employed on routine patrols, convoy escorts, running special forces in and out of Japanese-held areas, boom defence patrols in harbours at home and abroad, courier operations, survey work, and raiding Japanese-held coasts.

== RAN HDMLs ==
Ship	Builder	Commissioned	Career	Fate
HDML 1074	L. Robinson, UK	7 August 1940 (UK)		Sold on 24 January 1948
HDML 1125	Berthon Boats, UK	28 April 1942 (UK)		Ex-RN trans to RAN 1943. Trans to Royal Indian Navy 1944
HDML 1129	Thornycrofts, UK	7 November 1942 (UK)		Sold in December 1947
HDML 1161	Sittinghouse, UK	9 January 1943 (UK)		Sold on 10 December 1947
HDML 1321	Purdon, Aust	11 November 1943	Z Special Unit during WW2	Named Rushcutter in 1950s. Sold in August 1971. Sank in Darwin Harbour, 19 October 2016.
HDML 1322	Purdon, Aust	17 January 1944		Wrecked at North Head, Sydney, 5 August 1952
HDML 1323	MacFarlane, Aust	21 June 1944		Royal Navy 1950. Transferred to Philippines in 1958.
HDML 1324	MacFarlane, Aust	12 June 1944		Named Huon/Nepean in 1957? Laid up and dismantled, 1982
HDML 1325	E. Jack, Aust	4 November 1943		Named Leeuwin in 1950s. Active 1988
HDML 1326	E. Jack, Aust	19 January 1944		Royal Navy 1950. Transferred to Philippines in 1958.
HDML 1327	Purdon, Aust	29 May 1944		Sold 1958
HDML 1328	MacFarlane, Aust	16 Jan 1945		Royal Navy 1950. Transferred to Philippines in 1958.
HDML 1329	E. Jack, Aust	14 June 1944		Royal Navy 1950. Transferred to Philippines in 1958.
HDML 1338	C.P. Leek, USA	31 May 1944		Paid off 1946. Returned to USN under lend-lease?
HDML 1339	C.P. Leek, USA	15 June 1944		Paid off 1946. Returned to USN under lend-lease?
HDML 1340	L.S. Thorson, USA	12 May 1944		Sold 1948
HDML 1341	L.S. Thorson, USA	1 December 1944		Paid off 1946. Returned to USN under lend-lease?
HDML 1342	L.S. Thorson, USA	24 July 1944		Paid off 1946. Returned to USN under lend-lease?
HDML 1343	L.S. Thorson, USA	3 October 1944		Paid off 1946. Returned to USN under lend-lease?
HDML 1344	Truscott, USA?		Not commissioned	Placed in reserve on 26 October 1945
HDML 1345	Truscott, USA?		Not commissioned	Placed in reserve on 26 October 1945
HDML 1346	Truscott, USA	6 January 1945		Paid off 1945. Returned to USN under lend-lease?
HDML 1347	Truscott, USA	1 January 1945		Paid off 1946. Returned to USN under lend-lease?
HDML 1352	Freeport, USA	12 May 1944		Sold 1948
HDML 1353	Freeport, USA	18 October 1944		Paid off 1946. Returned to USN under lend-lease?
HDML 1354	Freeport, USA	11 December 1944		Paid off 1946. Returned to USN under lend-lease?
HDML 1355	Freeport, USA	11 December 1944		Paid off 1946. Returned to USN under lend-lease?
HDML 1356	Elscot, USA	20 December 1944		Paid off 1946. Returned to USN under lend-lease?
HDML 1357	Elscot, USA	4 November 1944		Paid off 1946. Returned to USN under lend-lease?
HDML 1358	Elscot, USA	21 October 1944		Paid off 1946. Returned to USN under lend-lease?
HDML 1359	Elscot, USA	22 September 1944		Paid off 1946. Returned to USN under lend-lease?

== RAN Fairmiles ==
A Fairmile school was established at HMAS Rushcutter on 1 June 1942. The first Australian Fairmile, ML 813, entered service at the end of that year. Originally designed in the UK for coastal anti-submarine and convoy duties, the RAN Fairmiles performed these and a variety of other functions. Their tasks included convoy escort, servicing and supporting advancing troops, landing and recovering commandos and coastwatchers, rescuing civilians from enemy occupied territories, and invasion escort.

Ship	Builder	Commissioned	Career	Fate
ML 424	Green Point, NSW	28 January 1943		Listed for disposal in March 1947 and sold in August, 1947. This was purchased by Roylen Cruises, Mackay, Queensland. The name came from the last three letters of the founder's son Fitzroy and his daughter Helen. In the mid-1970s it was sold and renamed Reef Princess. It met its fate off Townsville on Wheelers Reef in 1981. This story was covered in a newspaper article entitled "Death of a Princess".
ML 425	Green Point, NSW	6 Feb 1943		Sold August, 1947
ML 426	Green Point, NSW	5 Mar 1943		Sold July, 1947
ML 427	Green Point, NSW	15 Mar 1943		Sold August, 1947
ML 428	Green Point, NSW	31 Mar 1943		Sold August, 1947
ML 429	Green Point, NSW	15 Apr 1943		Sold August, 1947
ML 430	Green Point, NSW	6 May 1943		Lost in a "friendly fire" incident with ML819 in New Guinea waters, 13 August 1944, when the two vessels were hunting a Japanese submarine.
ML 431	Green Point, NSW	14 May 1943		Sold August, 1947
ML 801	Green Point, NSW	29 May 1943		Sold September, 1947
ML 802	Green Point, NSW	15 Jun 1943		Sold December, 1947
ML 803	Green Point, NSW	3 Jul 1943		Sold December, 1947
ML 804	Green Point, NSW	15 Jul 1943		Sold August, 1947
ML 805	Green Point, NSW	3 Aug 1943		Sold January, 1948
ML 806	Green Point, NSW	8 Sep 1943		Sold December, 1947
ML 807	Green Point, NSW	13 Sep 1943		Sold November, 1947
ML 808	Green Point, NSW	23 Sep 1943		Sold December, 1947
ML 809	Green Point, NSW	8 Oct 1943		Sold August, 1947. This vessel was acquired by Northern Plywood at Cairns and later acquired (1952) by McLean's Roylen Cruises and renamed Roylen Star. It was commanded by Fitzroy McLean with engineer John Lacey for much of its Roylen service. It was sold in 1979 and sank near Palm Island in about 1979.
ML 810	Green Point, NSW	25 Oct 1943		This vessel was named Ajax and fitted out as a luxury cruiser with all internal fittings fitted out in mahogany. It was refitted with two Hall Scott petrol engines and was believed to be able to reach speeds in excess of 20 knots. When it was acquired by Roylen Cruises it was renamed Petaj, the first 3 letters of the son of Fitzroy McLean and the last two letters of the Ajax, as it was believed to be bad luck to completely change a vessels name. The petrol engines were removed as they were prone to fire and it was refitted with two cat diesel engines, giving it a speed of approximately 16 knots. This vessel was used for more up market guests and was also used (between the 15 to 18 July 1966) for HRH Prince Charles to cruise the Barrier Reef. This trip was commanded by Captain Fitzroy McLean. Petaj was badly damaged in Cyclone Kerry in the late 1970s, but was later repaired. In the mid-1990s Petaj was used in the Solomon Islands for a Fishing / local buying vessel. It was surrounded by controversy and later sank near Munda in the Solomon Islands. It is believed that it was later refloated by a dive operation from Gizo which took it to a side of Gizo and resunk it as a dive site, near Plum Pudding Island where President John F Kennedy's PT 109 was cut in half in an area known as "The Slot"
ML 811	Green Point, NSW	5 Nov 1943		Sold August, 1947
ML 812	Green Point, NSW	4 Dec 1943		Sold November, 1947
ML 813	Halvorsen, NSW	16 Nov 1943		Sold August, 1947
ML 814	Halvorsen, NSW	1 Jan 1943		Sold August, 1947
ML 815	N. Wright, Qld	11 Jan 1943		Sold November, 1947
ML 816	N. Wright, Qld	2 Jun 1943		Sold August, 1949
ML 817	Halvorsen, NSW	16 Feb 1943		Sold November, 1947
ML 818	Halvorsen, NSW	29 Mar 1943		Sold August, 1947
ML 819	Halvorsen, NSW	10 Mat 1943		Sold August, 1947
ML 820	Halvorsen, NSW	21 Jun 1943		Sold August, 1947
ML 821	Halvorsen, NSW	27 Jul 1943		Sold August, 1947
ML 822	Halvorsen, NSW	30 Aug 1943		Sold January, 1943
ML 823	Halvorsen, NSW	30 Sep 1943		Sold October, 1947. This was operated by Loch Nicholson from Lindeman Island under the name of Esmeralda, but later was purchased by the Evetts family and renamed the Elizabeth E which operated similar cruises to that of Roylen Cruises. The Evetts were so impressed with the design that they later had another vessel built in a very similar design to that of the original Fairmile.
ML 824	Halvorsen, NSW	18 Nov 1943		Sold November, 1947
ML 825	Halvorsen, NSW	1 Feb 1944		Sold January 1948
ML 826	N. Wright, Qld	1 Jan 1944		Sold November, 1947
ML 827	N. Wright, Qld	19 Apr 1944		Grounded at Jacquinot Bay, New Britain on 17 November 1944, sank while under tow by Cambrian Salvor off New Britain on 20 November 1944.
ML 828	N. Wright, Qld	Order cancelled		

== Surviving craft ==
One Fairmile survives as Challenger 1, based in Melbourne for charter. It went to Fremantle in 1962, then to Gold Coast in 1977. It was upgraded there with a more-upmarket fitout. The previous east-coast survivor was an ex Roylen Cruises fairmile, Roylen Sandra which sank in a creek at Ingham in 2010. The fate of second last to stay afloat was ex HML 815 which became Roylen Pataj (named after the son and grandson of the operators of Roylen Cruises, Peter with the last letters of AJAX as it was known) this sank Rendova Island in the Solomon Islands and was later raised and sunk again near Kennedy Island near Gizo as dive site by the local scuba diving company. Petaj was fitted out as a luxury cruiser and was also used to ferry HRH Prince Charles around the Barrier Reef in 1965 before being acquired by Roylen Cruises.

== See also ==
- Coastal Forces of the Royal Navy
- Coastal Forces of the Royal Canadian Navy
- Coastal Forces of the Royal New Zealand Navy
- Coastal Forces of World War II
