= List of ships and craft of Task Force O =

Task Force O was the naval component responsible for landing troops at Omaha Beach during the Normandy Landings, June 6, 1944. Bombarding Force C, also part of Task Force O was the group responsible for supporting gunfire to the landings. Unless otherwise noted, all ships belonged to the United States Navy or United States Coast Guard.

== Assault Group O1 ==
- APA/LSI(L) Unit
  - APA 26 USS Samuel Chase
    - LCVP x26
  - APA 45 USS Henrico
    - LCVP x26
  - SS Empire Anvil – British LSI(L)
    - LCA x18
- LST Unit
  - LST 309
  - LST 314
  - LST 357
  - LST 373
  - LST 374
  - LST 376
- Landing Craft
  - LCI(L) x5
  - LCM x18
  - LCT x53
- Others
  - LCC 10
  - LCC 20

== Assault Group O2 ==
- APA/LSI(L) Unit
  - APA 28 USS Charles Carroll
    - LCVP x26
  - APA 30 USS Thomas Jefferson
    - LCVP x26
  - SS Empire Javelin – Royal Navy LSI(L), carrying 1st Battalion 116th Infantry regiment
    - LCA x18 (551st Flotilla)
- LST Unit
  - LST 310
  - LST 315
  - LST 316
  - LST 317
  - LST 332
  - LST 372
- Landing Craft
  - LCI(L) x17
  - LCM x18
  - LCT x54
- Others
  - LCC 30
  - LCC 40
  - LCC 50

== Assault Group O3 ==
- AP Unit
  - AP 67 USS Dorothea L. Dix
    - LCVP x26
  - AP 76 USS Anne Arundel
    - LCVP x26
  - AP 77 USS Thurston
    - LCVP x26
- LST Unit
  - LST 6
  - LST 51
  - LST 75
  - LST 133
  - LST 134
  - LST 157
  - LST 285
  - LST 286
  - LST 347
  - LST 350
  - LST 375
  - LST 502
- Landing Craft
  - LCI(L) x11
  - LCT x39
- Others
  - HMS Oceanway – Royal Navy dock landing ship

== Assault Group O4 ==
- LSI(S) Unit – Royal Navy
  - SS Prince Baudoin LSI(S)
    - LCA x8 (507th Assault Flotilla)
  - SS Prince Charles LSI(S)
    - LCA x8
  - SS Prince Leopold, a LSI(S)
    - LCA x8
- LSI(H) Unit – Royal Navy
  - SS Amsterdam
    - LCA x8
  - SS Ben My Cree, a LSI(H), HQ 514th Assault Flotilla
    - LCA x8
  - SS Princess Maud, a LSI(H)
    - LCA x8

== Support Group ==
- Landing Craft Flak (LCF) x7 -
- Landing Craft Gun (Large) x5
- LCP(L) Smoke x28
- LCT (Armoured) (Note: An LCT with added protection. These were British vessels on loan to US) x8
- LCT (High Explosive) x10
- LCT (Rocket) x9

== Patrol craft ==
- PC 552
- PC 553
- PC 564
- PC 565
- PC 568
- PC 576
- PC 617
- PC 618

== Anti-submarine trawlers ==
- HMS Bressay – Royal Navy
- HMS Coll – Royal Navy
- HMS Sky – Royal Navy

== Minesweeper Group ==
- Sweep Unit 1 (4th Minesweeper Flotilla) – Royal Navy
  - HMS Albury
  - HMS Elgin
  - HMS Kellett
  - HMS Lydd
  - HMS Pangbourne
  - HMS Ross
  - HMS Saltash
  - HMS Selkirk
  - HMS Sutton
- Sweep Unit 2 (31st Minesweeper Flotilla) – Royal Canadian Navy
  - HMCS Blairmore
  - HMCS Caraquet
  - HMCS Cowichan
  - HMCS Fort William
  - HMCS Malpeque
  - HMCS Milltown
  - HMCS Minas
  - HMCS Mulgrave
  - HMCS Wasaga
- Sweep Unit 3 (167th Minesweeper Flotilla) – Royal Navy (BYMS-class minesweepers)
  - BYMS 2050
  - BYMS 2061
  - BYMS 2069
  - BYMS 2154
  - BYMS 2155
  - BYMS 2156
  - BYMS 2182
  - BYMS 2210
  - BYMS 2255
  - BYMS 2256
- Sweep Unit 4 (104th Minesweeper Flotilla) – Royal Navy
  - MMS 31
  - MMS 37
  - MMS 74
  - MMS 75
  - MMS 84
  - MMS 86
  - MMS 260
  - MMS 279
  - MMS 280
  - MMS 305
- Attached Motor Launches and Harbour Defence Motor Launches– Royal Navy
  - ML 118
  - ML 153
  - ML 163
  - ML 187
  - ML 189
  - ML 194
  - ML 214
  - ML 230
  - ML 448
  - ML 907
  - HDML 1383
  - HDML 1387

== Abbreviations ==
- AP/APA – Attack Transport
- BYMS – British Yard Mine Sweeper
- HDML – Harbour Defence Motor Launch
- LCA – Landing Craft Assault, carried about 36 troops
- LCC – Landing Craft Control
- LCI(L) – Landing Craft Infantry (Large)
- LCF – Landing Craft Flak, a landing craft fitted with anti-aircraft guns
- LCM – Landing Craft Mechanized
- LCT – Landing Craft Tank
- LCT (Armored) – Landing Craft Tank (Armored) (see Landing craft tank#Conversions and modifications)
- LCT (High Explosive) – Landing Craft Tank (High Explosive) – landing craft carrying self-propelled guns (see Landing craft tank#Conversions and modifications)
- LCVP – Landing Craft, Vehicle, Personnel
- LSD – Landing Ship Dock
- LSI(H) – Landing Ship Infantry (Hand-Hoist), the davits were manually operated winches
- LSI(L) – Landing Ship Infantry (Large),
- LSI(S) – Landing Ship Infantry (Small)
- LST – Landing Ship Tank
- MMS – Motor Minesweeper
