= Coastal Forces of the Royal New Zealand Navy =

Division of the Royal New Zealand Navy

Coastal Forces was a division of the Royal Navy established during World War II. It consisted of small coastal defence craft such as motor launches, submarine chasers, air-sea rescue launches, motor gun boats and motor torpedo boats. It did not include minesweepers, naval trawlers or landing craft. This article is about the equivalent boats used in the Royal New Zealand Navy (RNZN).

From 1921 until 1941 the New Zealand Navy was a Division of the Royal Navy. The RNZN was not created until 1 October 1941. Within six months of its creation the RNZN commissioned twelve Class B Fairmiles and sixteen Harbour Defence Motor Launches (HDMLs)

== RNZN Fairmiles ==
On 4 April 1941 the British War Cabinet approved a proposal for a striking force of anti-submarine motor-boats, six at Auckland, four at Wellington, and two at Lyttelton. Drawings and specifications of the Fairmile anti-submarine motorboat developed by Fairmile Marine were sent from England and it was agreed that these craft could be built in New Zealand providing the engines, ordnance and some prefabricated components came from England.

The Class B Fairmiles were 112 feet (34 m) long, displaced 85 tons and had a complement of 16. Twin 12-cylinder petrol engines generated 630 hp (470 kW) on each of two shafts for a speed of 20 knots (37 km/h). They were armed with a 2-pdr (40 mm) gun, a 20 mm Oerlikon cannon, twin 0.303 in Vickers GO machine guns, and 12 depth charges, and were fitted with an ASDIC sonar.

The orders were distributed among four Auckland firms. The estimated cost of each vessel was £35,000, making a total of £420,000 for the twelve. Delays occurred in the delivery of prefabricated components, the difficulty in getting supplies of first-class kauri timber and a serious shortage of skilled labour.

The newly formed RNZN commissioned the 12 Class B Fairmiles on 20 December 1943 and assigned pendant numbers Q 400 through to Q 411. The boats were not initially named, and were identified only through their pendant numbers.

Pendant	Reassigned (later)	Builder	Delivered	Career	Fate
Q 400		Bailey, Auckland	18 November 1942	Suffered engine room fire and explosion.	
Q 401		Bailey, Auckland	1 April 1943		
Q 402		Bailey, Auckland	November 1943		Renamed MV Ngaroma and used as a Waiheke ferry until 1992, when she went to Sri Lanka.
Q 403		Associated Boat Builders, Auckland	21 October 1942		The hull This special alloy CW engine remained in 2007, but had been removed by 2011 Lies on Paritata Peninsula in Whaingaroa Harbour. A local historian wrote, "This vessel was used in Tauranga for fishing trips until Gallaghers brought it to Raglan in the 1960s to extract its motor for the area’s first commercial trawler. The hull was purchased by Mr. Kirk who seems to have let it decay in his creek".
Q 404		Associated Boat Builders, Auckland	1 February 1943		
Q 405		Associated Boat Builders, Auckland	May 1943		Renamed as Marlyn on being decommissioned after WWII and run as ferry service to and from Lyttelton and Wellington (based in Wellington) until the Wahine Storm 1968 when it was damaged beyond economical repair.
Q 406		Associated Boat Builders, Auckland	July 1943		Was privately owned by Owen Woodbridge and named "Motunui" and then used as accommodation at Waitomo.
Q 407		Shipbuilders Limited, Auckland	8 March 1943		
Q 408		Shipbuilders Limited, Auckland	8 August 1943		
Q 409	HMNZS Maori (P3570)	Shipbuilders Limited, Auckland	August 1943	Re-purchased in 1953 and recommissioned as HMNZS Maori (P3570).	Sold in 1963 to become the Auckland-Waiheke ferry Iris Moana. Wrecked 1995
Q 410		Voss Limited, Auckland	January 1943		Renamed Sayandra in 1963.
Q 411	HMNZS Kahu II (P3571)	Voss Limited, Auckland	20 December 1943	Recommissioned from 1947 to 1965 as HMNZS Kahu I (P3571).	Was for sale in 1986, though without propeller shafts. Scrapped in 2023.

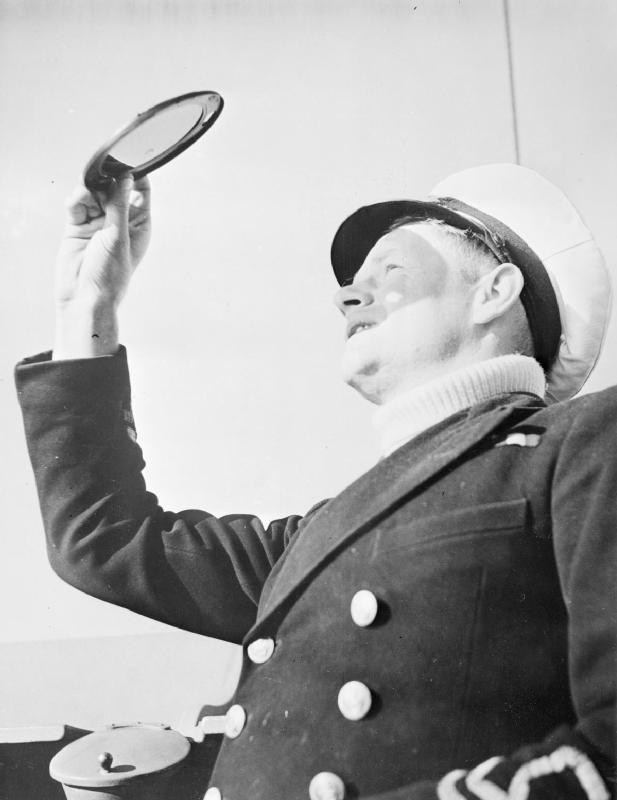
The commander of a New Zealand Fairmile looking through a small coloured disc which allowed him to look into the sky for enemy planes without damaging his eyes

The first Fairmile constructed, ML403 (Q 403), was launched on 29 September 1942 and commissioned on 21 October 1942. Thereafter the completed boats were delivered at short intervals. All the boats were completed and were then recommissioned into the newly formed RNZN on 20 December 1943.

=== RNZN Fairmiles in the Solomons ===
On 14 January 1944, Vice-Admiral William Halsey, Jr., Commander, South Pacific Area (part of the larger Pacific Ocean Areas), informed the New Zealand Naval Board that the "current employment of Japanese submarines and estimates of their future employment indicate immunity from the submarine menace in New Zealand waters". He proposed that the New Zealand Fairmile motor launches should be employed in the Solomon Islands, relieving American destroyers and patrol vessels for duty elsewhere.

The twelve Fairmiles were refitted for service in tropical waters and formed into the 80th and 81st Motor Launch Flotillas. The 80th Flotilla consisted of MLs 401 to 406 and the 81st Flotilla of MLs 407 to 411. The flotillas were based at Renard Sound in the Russell Islands. The base was named Kahu and for administrative purposes ML400 (Q 400) was commissioned on 1 April 1944 as HMNZS Kahu. During the seventeen months of their service in the Solomons, from March 1944 until June 1945, the twelve Fairmiles logged 380,000 miles (610,000 km) on anti-submarine screen patrols and on escorting ships. They had no encounters with Japanese forces.

=== RNZN Fairmiles post war ===
All the Fairmiles returned to Auckland in July 1945. In 1946-47 all but ML411 (Q 411) were sold to private buyers who used them for passenger and/or cargo service or as pleasure craft. ML411 was sold in 1965. ML409 (Q 409) was repurchased by the navy in 1953 and resold in 1963 to become the Auckland-Waiheke ferry Iris Moana. Two other former Fairmiles were renamed the Ngaroma and the Colville and used as the main ferries between Auckland and Great Barrier Island. They were skippered by Len Sowerby and his son Lester.

== RNZN Harbour Defence Launches ==
Sixteen Harbour Defence Motor Launches (HDMLs) purchased in the United States were commissioned between March 1943 and March 1944. The launches were 72 feet (22 m) long, displaced 54 tons, and had a complement of 10. Twin Diesels generated 270 hp (200 kW) on each of two shafts for a speed of 12 knots (22 km/h). They were armed with one 20mm Oerlikon, three Vickers GO machine guns and six depth charges.

Pendant	Reassigned (1950)	Commissioned	Career	Fate
Q1183	Mako (P3551)	1943-1976	Laid up 1945. Fishery protection 1946-72. Survey 1972-76, Wellington. Sold 1976.	Left RNZN 1976. Berthed at Pakuranga as launch Mako . Been refitted and in Australia (possibly Adelaide).2011 Now based in Brisbane, owner Dale Raby.
Q1184	Paea (P3552)	1943-1955	Laid up 1945. Fishery protection 1946-72. Survey 1972-76 Auckland. Reserves 1975-77. Sold 12/84.	In Picton 2005 being restored to wartime configuration by private owner. Purchased by Keith and Heather in 2008 and brought to Auckland. Now moored at Kauri Point in Auckland and used regularly for pleasure.
Q1185	Manga (P3567)	1943-1960	Laid up 1945. Trans'd to NZ Army as Bombardier. Returned from Army 1959. Fishery protection 1960-74. Transferred to RNZNVR 1974. Converted for Survey mid-late 1970s. Sold 1982.	Left RNZN 1980. Said to be at Kaipara for rebuilding. Owner bought boat ashore and bulldozed.
Q1186		1943-1945	Laid up 1945. Dismantled by RNZN and sold 1946.	Left RNZN 1948. Rebuilt as Wings Afloat. Went to Sydney 1970. Possibly then to Fiji.
Q1187	Tarapunga I (P3566)	1943-1955	Laid up 1945. Lent to Auckland Coast Guard 1947-50, Reserves 1951-80, Survey 1979-83, Wellington. Sold 3/84.	Left RNZN 1983. Reverted to name Tarapunga. Possibly moored Tamaki River. Now in Picton (2008) owned by Steve and Kim who live aboard at Picton Wharf (along with their cat). Destroyed in fire, March 2014
Q1188	Takapu I (P3556)	1943-1955	Laid up 1945. Reserves 1951-80. Survey 1981, Dunedin. Renamed Kahawai (II) in 1981. Sold 3/84.	Left RNZN 1983. Reverted to name Takapu. Chartered out of Whakatane until 2004. Possibly Pelorus Sound 2005.
Q1189		1943-1945	Laid up 1945. Sold 1946.	Left RNZN 1946. Became Sea Scout vessel Alert in Dunedin . Known to be in Milford Sound 1980 on deer recovery. Now located at a marine yard in Kopu, Thames
Q1190	Parore (P3562)	1943-1967	Laid up 1945. Reserves 1951-74. Fishery protection 1974-77. Survey, Wellington. Sold 1977.	Left RNZN 1976. At Evans Bay Wellington as launch Parore. Sold late 2008 from Nelson and moored at Shakespeare Bay, Picton. Declared a wreck after a saltwater pipe burst. Broken up September 2024
Q1191	Kahawai I (P3553)	1943-1966	Laid up 1945. Fishery protection 1974-77. Survey 1972, Auckland & Dunedin. Sold 1976.	Left RNZN 1976. Said to be ashore at Kopu in 1984 for refitting
Q1192	Maroro (P3554)	1943-1967	Laid up 1945. Reserves 1951-80. Fishery protection 1964-72. Sold 1972. Wrecked in Fiji, 27/8/82.	Left RNZN 1972. Went to Fiji as Viti 1972. Wrecked near Lautoka 1982
Q1193	Tamure (P3555)	1943-1945	Laid up 1945. Originally served with Fiji Naval Reserves to 1957 as HMS VITI. Renamed Ngapona (II) in 1958. Survey 1959-68, Auckland. Sold 3/73.	Served in Fiji (RFNVR) 1955-59; Ngapona 1959- Left RNZN 1973 Sold for charter work. Sank at Tutukaka 1982. Salvaged. Rebuilt as launch Tamure 1987. Possibly at Te Atutu. Now located at a marine yard in Kopu, Thames being restored.
Q1194	Ngapona I (P3561)	1943-1967	Laid up 1945. Survey 1948-57. Sold 1957. Wrecked near Coromandel after grounding 11/57.	Grounded Coromandel 1957, broken up 1958
Q1348	Kuparu (P3563)	1943-1967	Laid up 1945. Fishery protection & Survey 1972-84, Christchurch (Lyttelton). Sold 1984.	Fairly heavily rebuilt after collision with Admiralty Steps in mid 80's. Ended service 1989. Mothballed for museum but not used and sold by RNZN in 2002. Was rescued from her previous sorry state, extensively renovated and rebuilt and returned to sea as ML Kuparu. On 24 May 2026, in the Tasman Sea, 70 nautical miles off Ninety Mile Beach, suffered mechanical and electrical failure and began leaking. The crew of three were rescued by helicopter but, as of 28 May, the abandoned ship had not been located.
Q1349	Haku (P3565)	1944-1964	Laid up 1945. Fishery protection 1964-72. Survey 1973, Canterbury. Sold 1982.	Left RNZN on charter 1947. Became Black Watch, used for charity excursions. Reclaimed by RNZN 1952. Tamaki Tram duties. Left RNZN again 1980. Fitted with mast and ketch rig and became Black Watch again. In Auckland 2004. Sank at moorings 2018 and broken up.
Q1350	Koura (P3564)	1944-1967	Laid up 1945. Fishery protection & Survey 1973-84, Otago & Auckland, Museum ship 1984 at Paeroa.	Left RNZN 1984. Now located in Kopu, Thames
Q1351		1944-1945	Laid up 1945. Sold 1946.	Left RNZN 1946. Became Mt Maunganui Ferry Aotearoa 1951. Became Pakatoa Is Ferry Pakatoa 1965. Beached above Whenuapai 1985.

They operated as the 124th and 125th Motor Launch Flotillas, based on Auckland and Wellington respectively. They maintained anti-submarine patrols inside indicator loops. Though they were not tested by enemy action, the anti-submarine fixed defences at Wellington and Auckland attained a high degree of efficiency.

After the war, twelve were retained, three were sold and one was transferred to the Army. The remaining boats were refitted and re-engined with Foden diesels. These were subsequently used as fishery protection, survey and reserve training boats. All remaining boats were named and given new pendant numbers in 1950.

== See also ==
- Axis naval activity in New Zealand waters
- Minesweepers of the Royal New Zealand Navy
- Coastal fortifications of New Zealand
- Coastal Forces of the Royal Navy
- Coastal Forces of the Royal Canadian Navy
- Coastal Forces of the Royal Australian Navy
- Coastal Forces of World War II
