= MTB 102 =

1937 motor torpedo boat

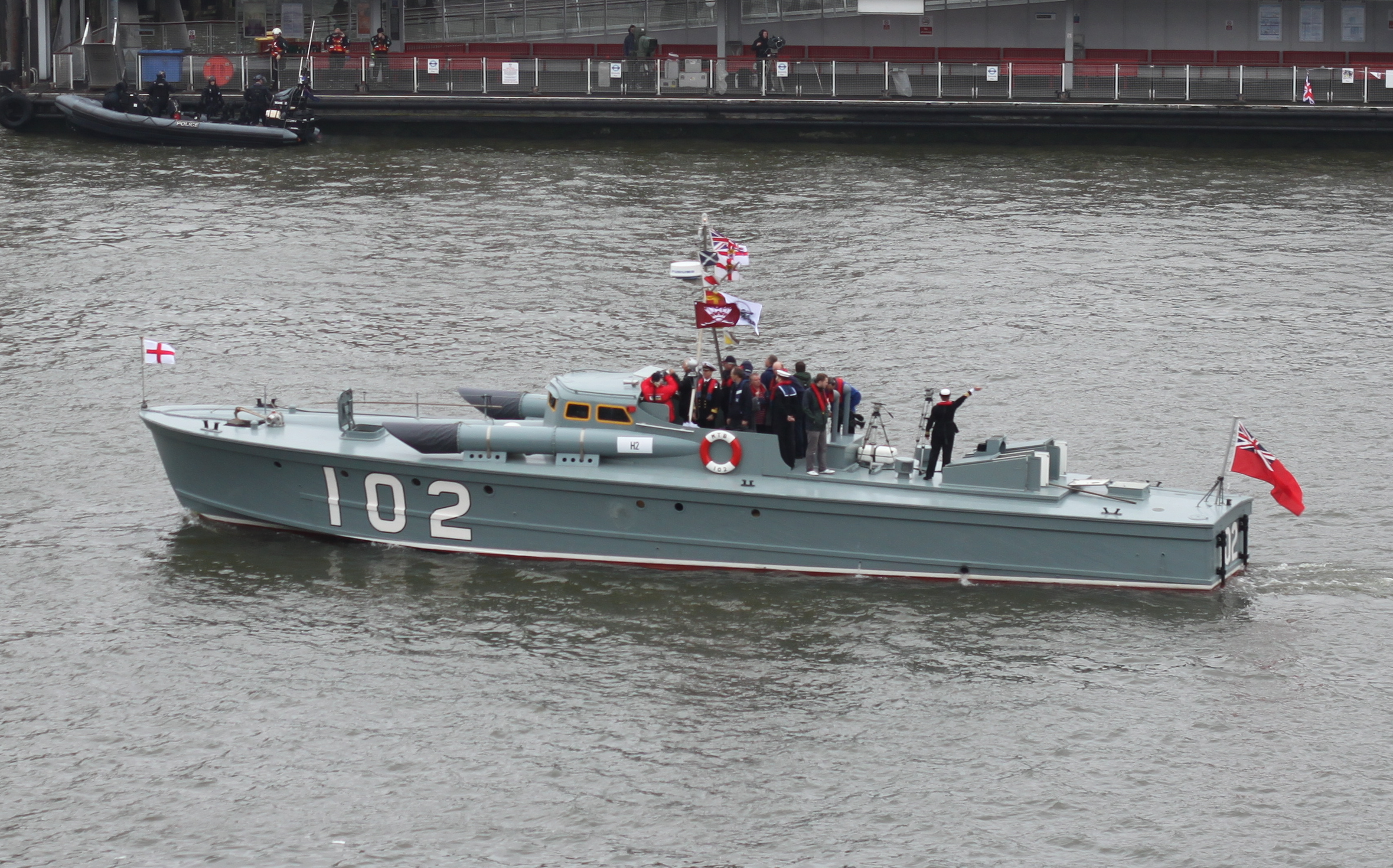
- MTB 102 taking part in the Thames Diamond Jubilee Pageant for Queen Elizabeth II's diamond jubilee

History

United Kingdom
- Builder: Vosper Ltd, Portsmouth
- Laid down: 1936
- Launched: 1937
- Identification: MMSI number: 235106809; Callsign: MFRQ
- Status: Heritage vessel

General characteristics
- Type: Motor Torpedo Boat
- Displacement: 33-ton
- Length: 68 ft (21 m)
- Beam: 14 ft 9 in (4.50 m)
- Draught: 3 ft 9 in (1.14 m)
- Propulsion: 3 1,150hp Isotta Fraschini IF 183 57-litre petrol W18 engines: 3,450 hp (2.57 MW)
- Speed: 48 knots (89 km/h) unloaded, 43 knots (80 km/h) loaded and armed
- Complement: 2 officers, 10 men
- Armament: 2 × 21 inch (530 mm) torpedo tubes

MTB 102 is one of the few surviving motor torpedo boats that served with the Coastal Forces of the Royal Navy in the Second World War. She was built as a prototype but was purchased and taken into service by the Admiralty.

She was the smallest vessel to ever serve as a flagship for the Royal Navy.

== Construction ==
Designed by Commander Peter Du Cane, the managing director of Vosper Ltd, in 1936. She was launched and completed at Portsmouth in 1937, bought by the Admiralty, and taken into service with the Royal Navy as MTB 102, the 100 series denoting a prototype vessel. She had an all-wood hull, described as "double diagonal Honduras mahogany on Canadian rock elm".

Besides the torpedo tubes she was built with, depth charges, machine guns, and the Swiss Oerlikon 20 mm anti-aircraft cannon were all tested on her.

MTB 102 was the fastest wartime British naval vessel in service at 48 knots.

== Wartime service ==
From 1939 to 1940, she was stationed in the English Channel. During Operation Dynamo (the evacuation from Dunkirk, May–June 1940), she crossed the channel eight times. She acted as flagship for Rear Admiral Wake-Walker when his flagship, destroyer HMS Keith, was disabled.

In 1943, she was transferred to the Army's 615 Water Transport Company, RASC, and renamed Vimy.

In 1944, she carried Winston Churchill and General Dwight D. Eisenhower to review the fleet for Operation Overlord, the invasion of Normandy.

== Postwar service ==
MTB 102 was sold off in 1945 and converted to a private motor cruiser on the North Sea.

In 1949, she was bought by Mr John Vander Ould and spent the next 15 years around the south coast being used as a private motor cruiser. Under the ownership of Mr Ould, she took part in the Coronation Naval Review off Portsmouth.

In April 1966, in an unseaworthy condition and partially converted into a houseboat, Derek Brown bought her from Robinson's boatyard Oulton Broad. Brown single-handedly completed extensive work and eventually relaunched MTB 102.

In 1973, she was acquired by the 1st Blofield and Brundall Sea Scouts of Norfolk, whose care she remained until 1995, when ownership passed to the MTB102 Trust. The vessel came with the purchase of the plot of land used as the group's water base at Brundall Marina on Hobros Dyke.

In 1976, she was refurbished by a film company for use in the film The Eagle Has Landed and in the Dutch film Soldier of Orange the following year.

In 1977, she appeared in Queen Elizabeth II's Silver Jubilee pageant on the River Thames.

In 1983 and 1990, extensive structural repair was carried out on the hull and decks, totalling around £70,000.

Since 1979, she has appeared several times at Navy Days and is now listed as part of the National Historic Fleet.

The MTB 102 Trust was established in 1996 to fund the operation and maintenance of MTB 102; it is a registered charity under English law.

Several changes in engines have occurred over her life. The original Italian Isotta Fraschini engines became difficult to maintain during the early part of the war as Italy allied with Germany. However, they lasted until replaced after the war when MTB 102 was converted to civilian use. In 1985, Perkins Ltd donated two turbocharged diesel engines, and in 1996 and 2002, Cummins Marine provided new engines.

102 appeared as herself in the 2017 war film Dunkirk.

== See also ==
- HMS Medusa (A353)
