= Madden and Lewis Company =

Shipyard in Sausalito, California, United States

Coordinates: 37.859545°N 122.483895°W

Madden, Lewis or Madden and Lewis Company or Madden and Lewis Corp. was a wooden shipbuilding company in Sausalito, California. To support the World War 2 demand for ships Madden, Lewis shipyard switched over to military construction and built: US Navy tugboats and Harbour Defence Motor Launch. The company was founded by James Herbert Madden Sr., who was also active in the Sausalito Yacht Club. James Herbert Madden Sr. and Gertrude Murphy Madden raised five children in Sausalito. Madden and Lewis Company also owned the Sausalito side of the Golden Gate Ferry Company that ran before the completion of the Golden Gate Bridge, the ferry was run by the Northwestern Pacific Railroad now the site of the Sausalito Ferry Terminal. After the war the yard returned to pleasure craft building and repair. On March 19, 1960 a large fire broke out at the boatyard. The boatyard was in Richardson Bay at 200 Johnson street, Sausalito, near the current Sausalito Yacht Harbor.

== US Navy Tugboats ==
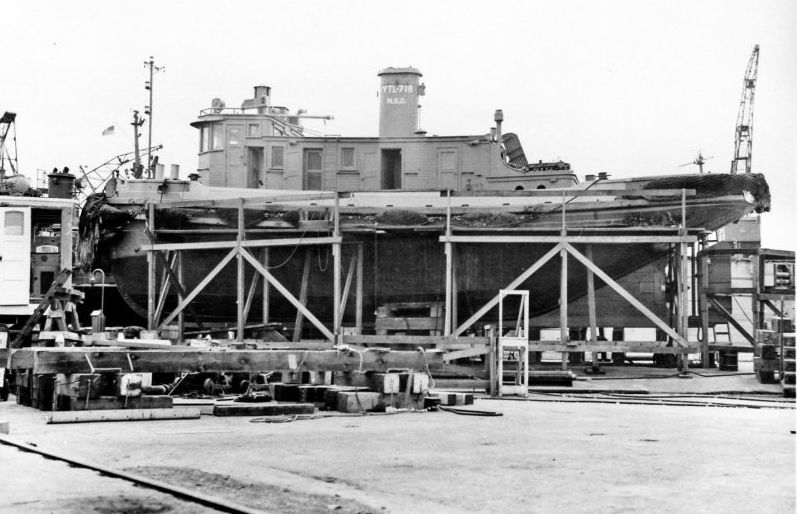
US Navy YTL, 70 ton, Harbor Tugs, Little

US Navy YTL, 60-foot, 70 ton, Harbor Tugs, Little, YLT had a displacement 70 tons lite, 80 tons full, a length of 66 feet, a beam of 18 feet, a draft of 4 feet 11 inches, a crew of 4, no armament, and diesel engine with a single propeller with 300shp. A Type V ship.

Name	Notes
YTL 316	Sold in 1947
YTL 317	Sold foreign in 1946
YTL 318	Sold foreign in 1947
YTL 319	Sold foreign in 1947
YTL 320	Sold foreign in 1947

== Harbour Defence Motor Launch ==
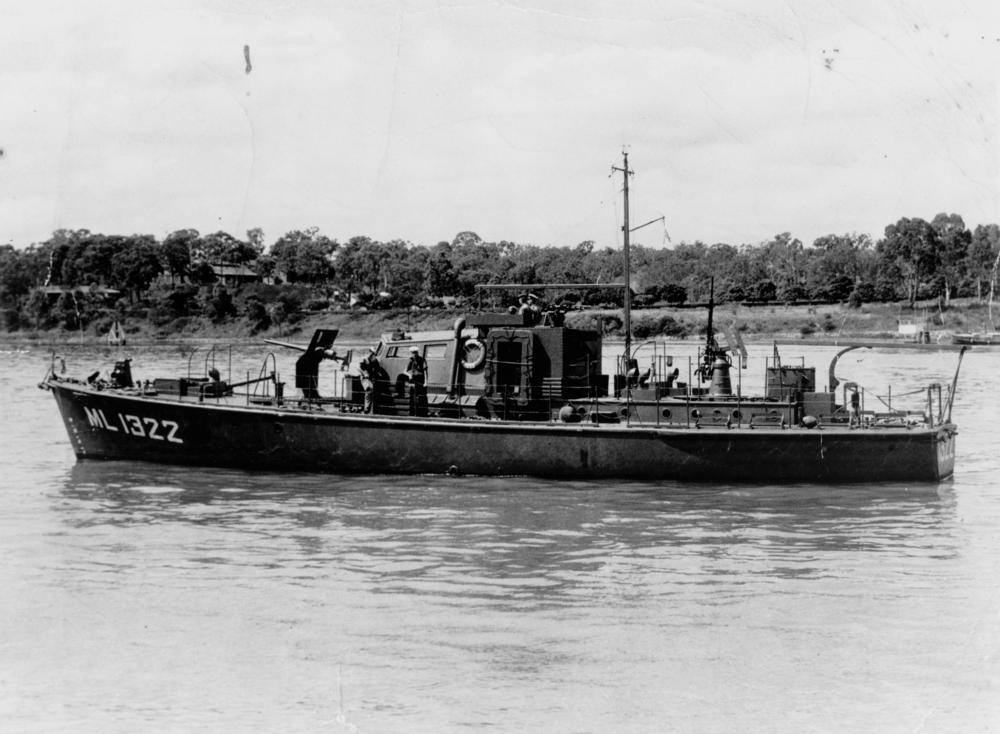
HDML, Harbour Defence Motor Launch with Royal Australian Navy in Brisbane in 1944

Madden and Lewis built Harbour Defence Motor Launch (HDML) were built for the US Navy, but all four went to the Royal New Zealand Navy (RNZN) for anti-submarine patrols. HDML had a length of 76 feet, a beam of 16 feet a draft: 5 feet and a displacement of 54-tons. HDML had two engines. They had a crew of 10 men, armed with one 3 or 4 pounder gun and four .303 AA guns. Had a top speed of 11 knots.

Nane	Delivered	Note
Q 1183	6-Mar-43	To RNZN, later Cook (SDML), Maori (P 3551), to FPS as HMNZS Mako, sold in 1976
Q 1184	9-Mar-43	To RNZN, later Philomel (SDML), as P-3552, to FPS as Paea, sold in 1985
Q 1185	6-Apr-43	To RNZN, to RNZA 1946 as Bombardier, to RNZN 1959 as Manga, (P 3567), sold in 1981, later Olphert, Haimona, abandoned
Q 1186	22-Apr-43	To RNZN, sold 1947, later Olphert 1956, Parore 1967,

== See also ==
- California during World War II
- Maritime history of California
- Myron Spaulding
- Wooden boats of World War 2
- Sausalito Shipbuilding
- Marinship
