= HMNZS Kahu (P3571) =

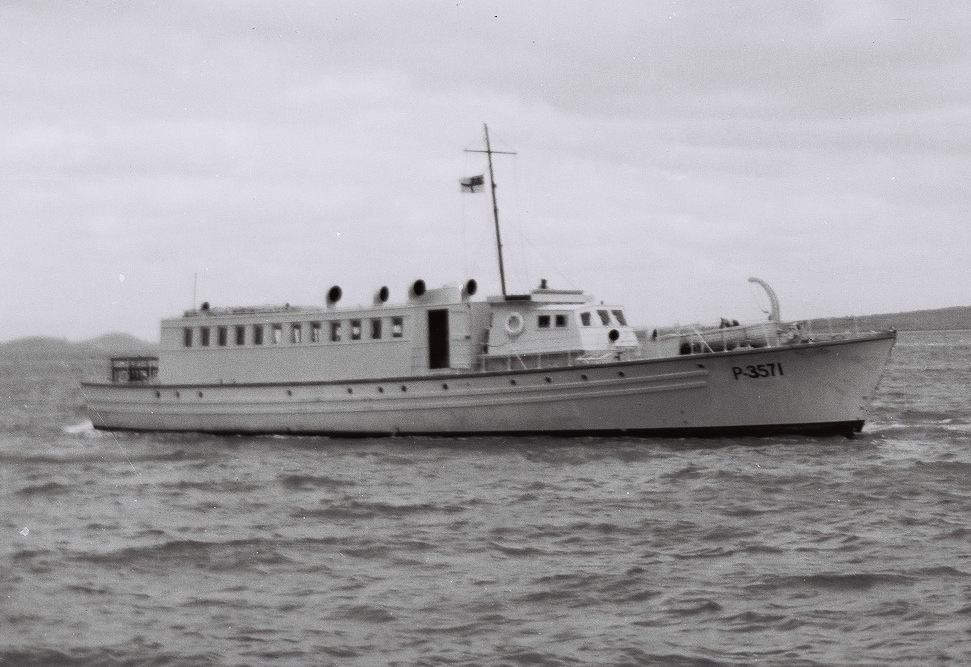
- (Post war)

History

New Zealand
- Laid down: 1942
- Commissioned: 1947
- Decommissioned: 1965
- Fate: Scrapped in 2023

General characteristics
- Class & type: Fairmile B class motor launch
- Displacement: 85 tons
- Length: 112 ft (34 m)
- Beam: 18 ft 3 in (5.56 m)
- Draught: 4 ft 9 in (1.45 m)
- Propulsion: Twin petrol engines totaling 1200 bhp
- Speed: 20 knots (37 km/h; 23 mph)
- Range: 1,500 mi (1,300 nmi; 2,400 km) at 12 knots (22 km/h; 14 mph)
- Complement: 16
- Sensors & processing systems: asdic, the forerunner of sonar
- Armament: 1 × 3-lb Mk I gun 1 × twin 0.303-in Machineguns 12 depth charges
- Armour: Wheelhouse plated

HMNZS Kahu (P3571) was a Fairmile B motor launch of the Royal New Zealand Navy.

Originally commissioned on 20 December 1943, with the pendant number Q 411, she was part of the 80th Motor Launch Flotilla. Early in 1944, she went to the Solomon Islands where she served under the operational control of COMSOPAC.

She was recommissioned from 1947 to 1965 as HMNZS Kahu I (P3571)

== See also ==
- HMNZS Maori (P3570)
- New Zealand Coastal Forces of World War II
