= Keeten-class minesweeper =

Royal Navy harbour defence motor launches

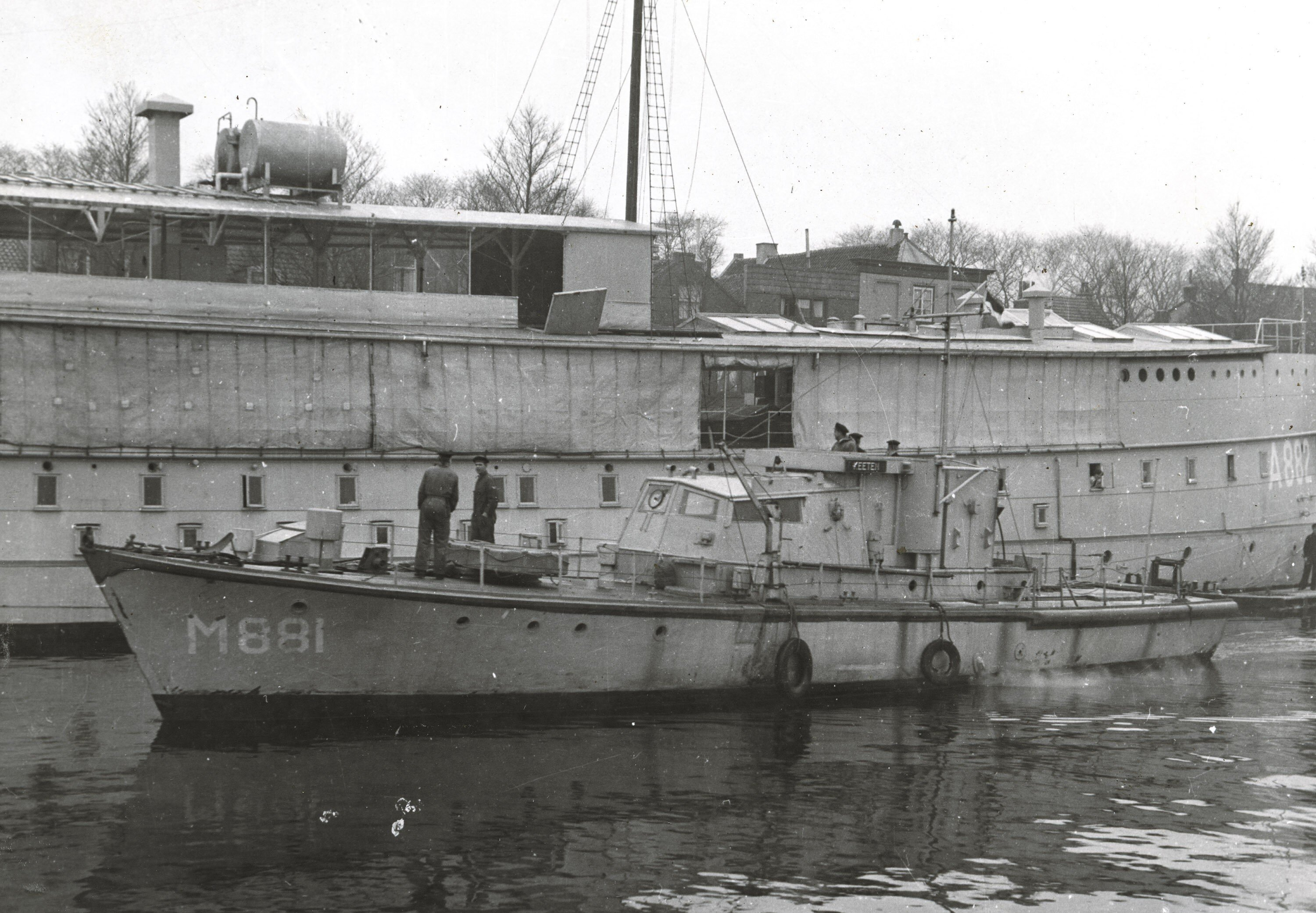
- Keeten

Class overview
- Name: Keeten class
- Builders: Frederick Nichol, Durban, South Africa; Berthon Boat, Lymington, United Kingdom
- Operators: Royal Netherlands Navy
- Built: 1942–1942
- In service: 1946–1964
- Planned: 3

General characteristics
- Type: Minesweeper
- Displacement: 46 t (45 long tons) full load
- Length: 21.95 m (72 ft 0 in)
- Beam: 4.87 m (16 ft 0 in)
- Draught: 1.54 m (5 ft 1 in)
- Installed power: 152 bhp (113 kW) each engine
- Propulsion: Twin handed Gardner 8L3 marine diesel engines; 2 propellers
- Speed: 11 knots (20 km/h; 13 mph)
- Range: 2,000 mi (1,700 nmi; 3,200 km) at 10 knots (19 km/h; 12 mph)(1,650 gallons)
- Crew: 12

The Keeten class was a ship class of three minesweepers that served in the Royal Netherlands Navy (RNN) between 1946 and 1964. They were former Royal Navy harbour defence motor launches sold to the RNN in 1946.

== History ==
The ships were used as patrol boats in the Dutch East Indies and in this role were equipped with a single 20 mm gun and a single machine gun. They were known as RP104, RP105 and RP106.

In 1949 the ships were reclassified as shallow-water minesweepers, with their hull numbers changing to MV31, MV32 and MV33 respectfully.

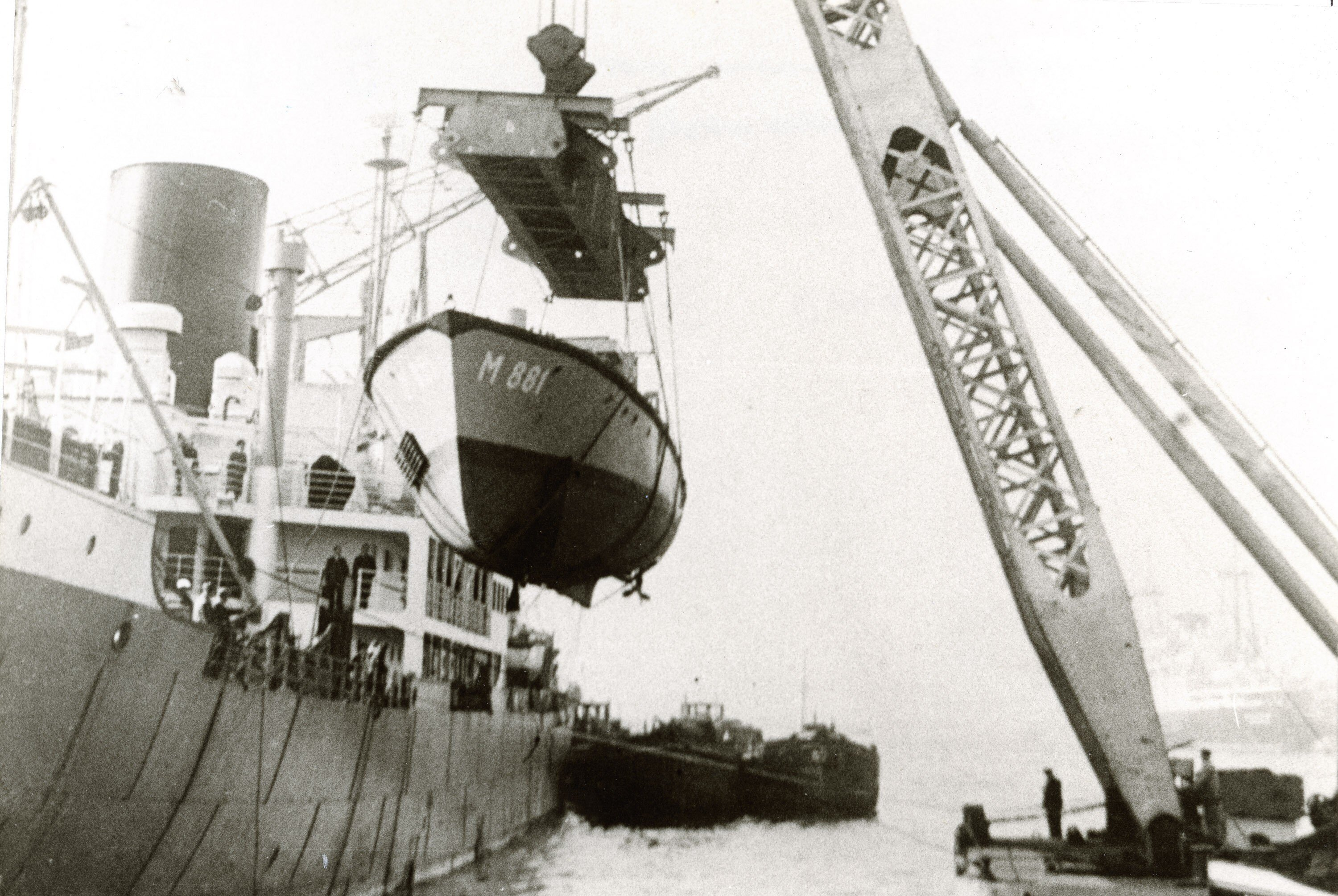
Keeten being unloaded in the Port of Rotterdam after transport

The three ships were decommissioned on 15 August 1951 and put on transport to The Netherlands on 2 September 1951. In February 1953 they were recommissioned as HNLMS Keeten (M881), HNLMS Mastgat (M882) and HNLMS Zijpe (M883).

In January 1956 they left service as minesweepers and entered a refit period to become diving support vessels. When the entered service as diving support vessels, there hull numbers changed once more to Y8128, Y8129 and Y8130 respectively.

Mastgat and Zijpe were both decommissioned in 1962. Keeten was the last to be decommissioned in 1964.

== Ships in class ==
Hull number	Name	Builder	Comm./Recomm.	Decommissioned	Fate	Notes	Source
RP104 / MV31 M881 / Y8128	Jakhals (Note: Jakhals was the unofficial name until 1953.)	Frederick Nichol, Durban, 1942	20 April 1946	15 August 1951		Ex-HMS HDML 1337	
RP104 / MV31 M881 / Y8128	Keeten (Note: Keeten was the official name from 1953 onwards.)	Frederick Nichol, Durban, 1942	February 1953	1964		Ex-HMS HDML 1337	
RP105 / MV32 M882 / Y8129	Panter (Note: Panter was the unofficial name until 1953.)	Frederick Nichol, Durban	10 July 1946	15 August 1951	Sold to Wijsmuller bv.	Ex-HMS HDML 1400	
RP105 / MV32 M882 / Y8129	Mastgat (Note: Mastgat was the official name from 1953 onwards.)	Frederick Nichol, Durban	February 1953	20 December 1962	Sold to Wijsmuller bv.	Ex-HMS HDML 1400	
RP106 / MV33 M883 / Y8130	Hermelijn (Note: Hermelijn was the unofficial name until 1953.)	The Berthon Boat Company, Lymington	10 July 1946	15 August 1951	Sold to Hoekman bv.	Ex-HMS HDML 1483	
RP106 / MV33 M883 / Y8130	Zijpe (Note: Zijpe was the official name from 1953 onwards.)	The Berthon Boat Company, Lymington	February 1953	October 1962	Sold to Hoekman bv.	Ex-HMS HDML 1483	
