= HMAS Rushcutter (naval base) =

Former Royal Australian Navy base

- Rushcutters Bay and Darling Point, Sydney, New South Wales in Australia
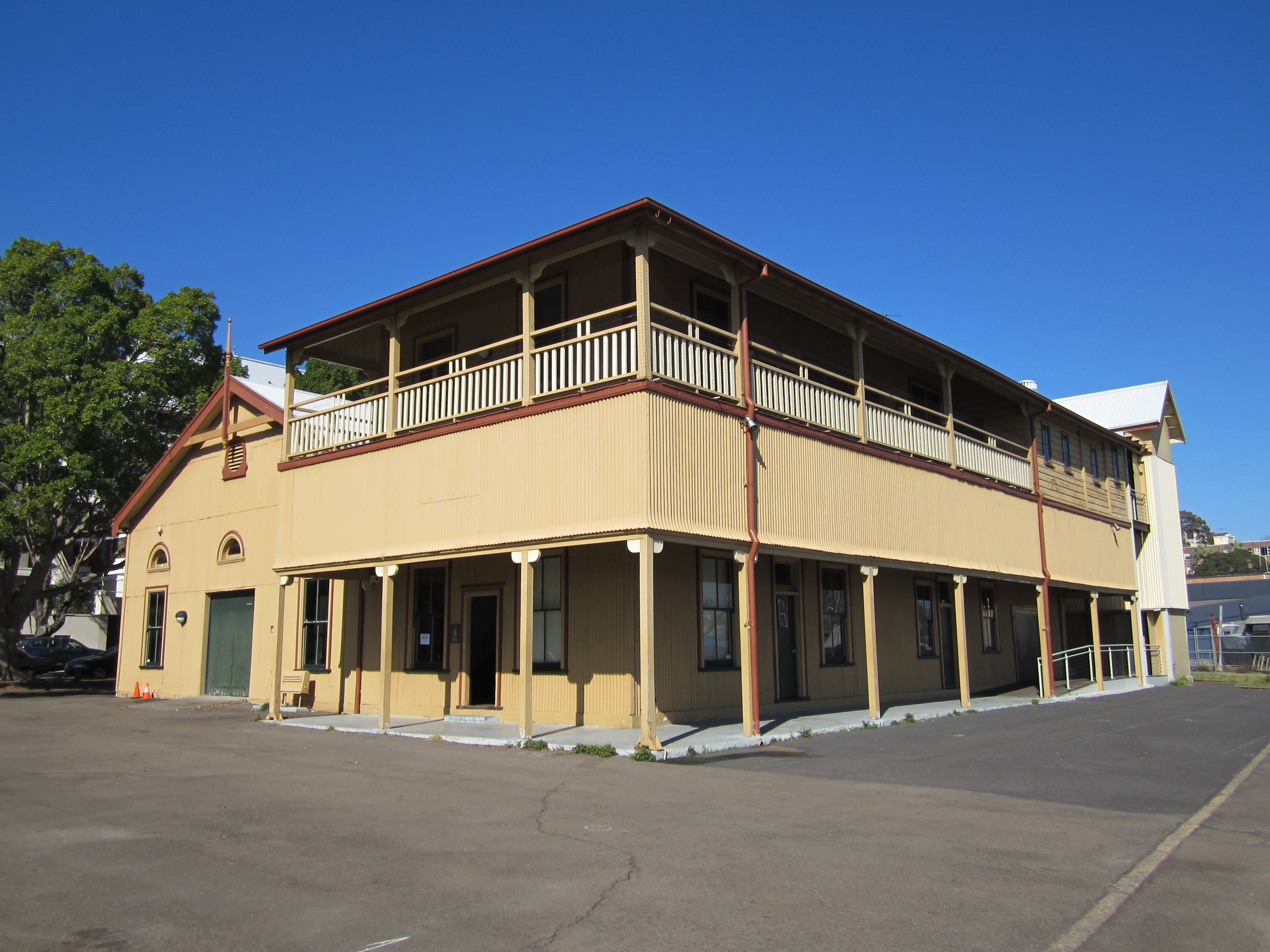
- The drill hall at HMAS Rushcutter. This building has been used by community groups since it was handed over by the Government of Australia.

Site information
- Type: Naval base
- Owner: Department of Defence
- Operator: Royal Australian Navy (1901 – 1979)

Location
- Location in New South Wales
- Coordinates: 33°52′22″S 151°14′06″E

Site history
- In use: 1 August 1940 – 1979
- Fate: Decommissioned in 1979; Site transferred to Government of New South Wales for ongoing ownership and recreational use

HMAS Rushcutter is a former Royal Australian Navy (RAN) base that served as a depot, radar and anti-submarine training school located at Rushcutters Bay and Darling Point, in Sydney's eastern suburbs in New South Wales, Australia.

== History ==
Originally the New South Wales headquarters of the Naval Brigade and naval artillery from 1901, the site was used as an administrative depot due to the demolition of Fort Macquarie as facilities for the compulsory peacetime training from 1911-1929. The site remained as the Naval Reserve Depot and the Anti Submarine School was opened there in 1939 and used by the RAN and newly formed Anti-Submarine Branch of the Naval Reserve.

On 1 August 1940, the depot was commissioned as HMAS Rushcutter. During World War II the site housed the Anti-Submarine School, the Radar and Gunnery Instruction School and served as a base for the mosquito fleet: Harbour Defence Motor Launches, the Fairmiles and the Naval Auxiliary Patrol Boats. The training of RAN Radar Operators transferred from HMAS Rushcutter to HMAS Watson in 1943. The technical functions of Radar operation remained at HMAS Rushcutter. At the end of World War II, the site became a training facility for the RAN Experimental Labs and Research Labs.

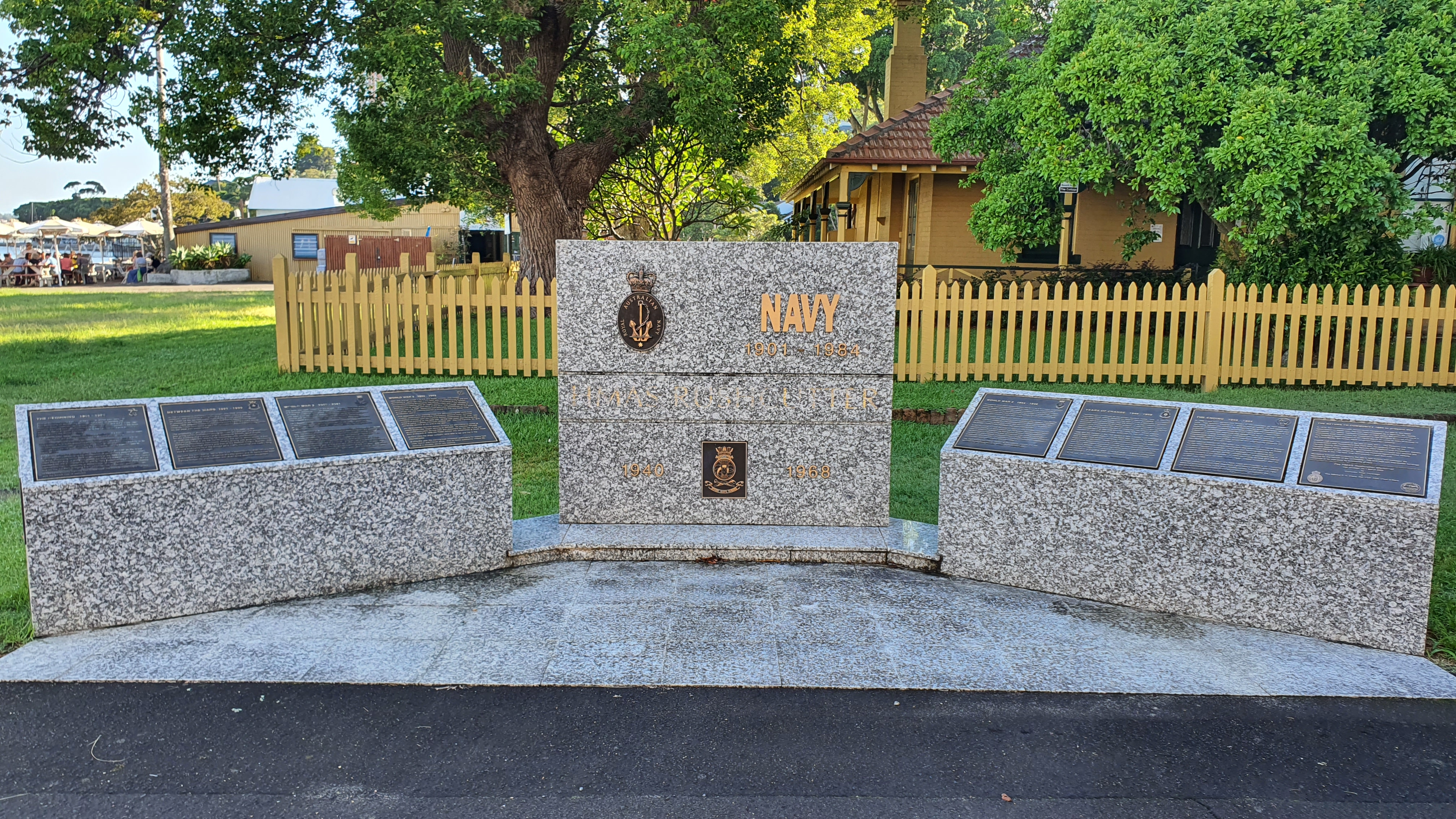
HMAS Rushcutter 1901-1984 Memorial

== Current use ==
In 1979 the Government of Australia transferred the site to the Government of New South Wales ownership for public recreational use.

== See also ==
- Coastal Forces of the Royal Australian Navy
- List of former Royal Australian Navy bases
