= Operation Copper =

Allied World War II special operation in Borneo

Coordinates: 3°25′0″S 143°34′59″E

- Part of World War II
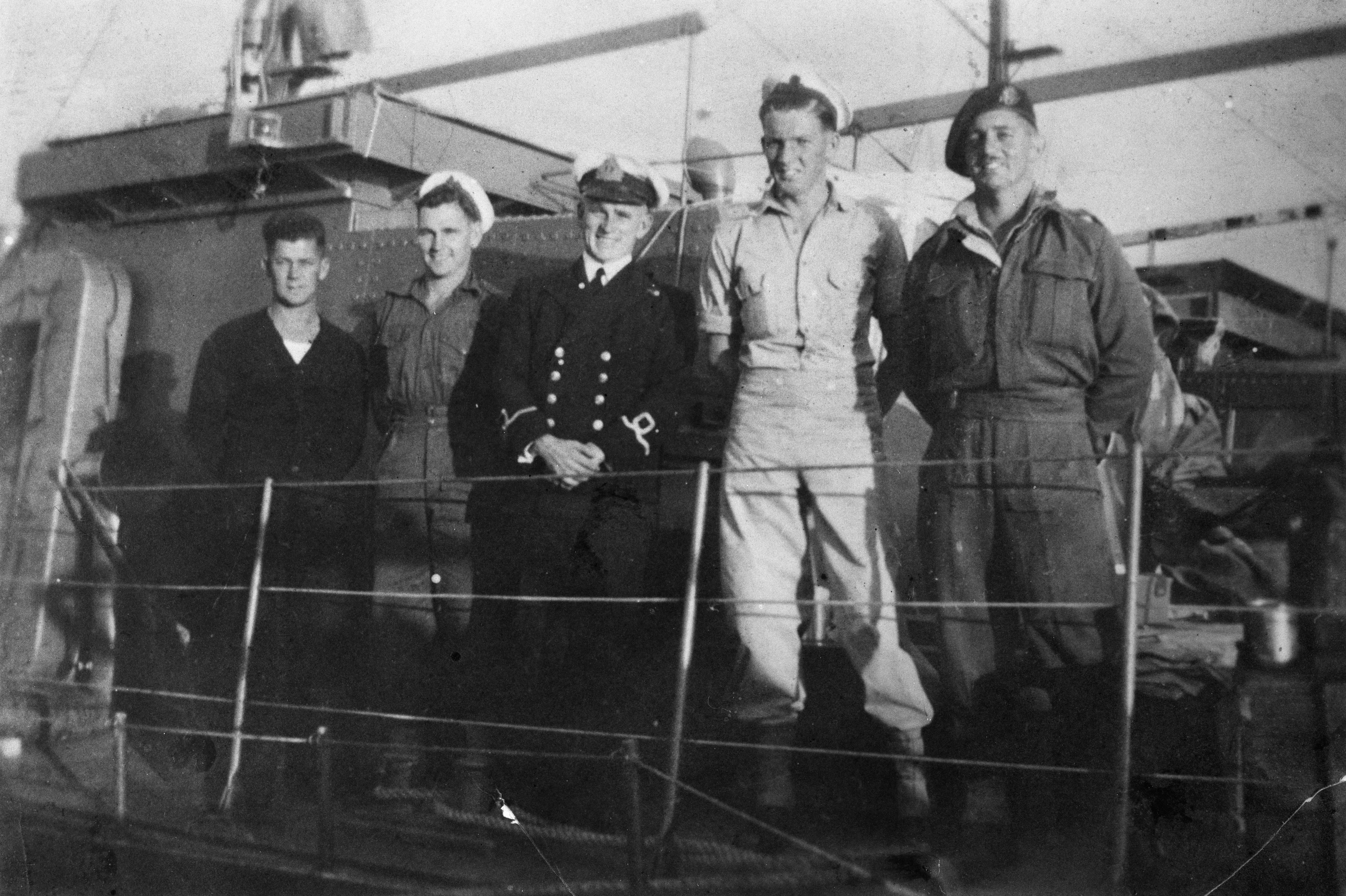
- Four of the crew members of Motor Launch (ML) 1321 and NX73110 Sapper (Spr) Edgar Thomas 'Mick' Dennis, Z Special Unit, the only survivor of the ill-fated raid on Muschu Island (off the coast of New Guinea), at Brisbane dockyard; May 1945 (on right)
Date	11 April 1945
Location	Muschu Island, Territory of New Guinea
Result	Japanese victory

Belligerents
Z Special Unit	Imperial Japanese Army; Imperial Japanese Navy

Commanders and leaders
	Captain Kiyoshisa Noto

Strength
8	Roughly 1,000

Casualties and losses
7	

Operation Copper was carried out by the Allied commando unit Z Special Unit, during World War II. The objective of the mission was to investigate the Japanese defences on Muschu Island, capture a Japanese officer for interrogation and discover the location of two naval guns on the island that covered the approaches to Wewak Harbour. Eight commandos were landed as part of the operation; only one survived.

== Background ==
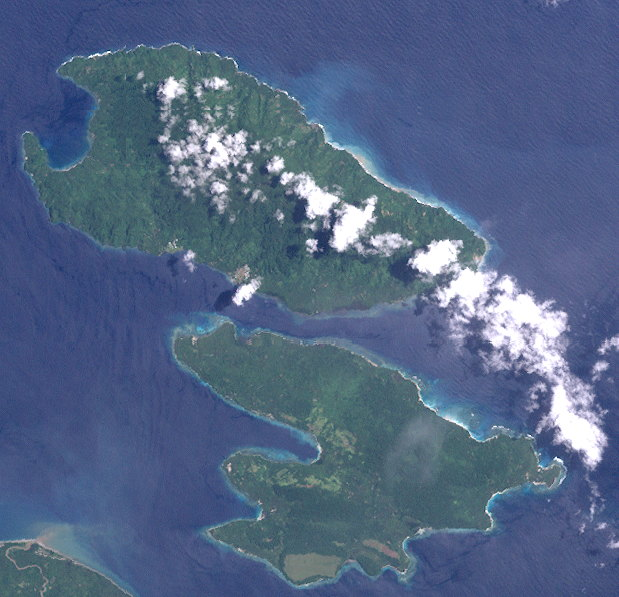
Satellite image of Kairiru & Muschu Islands

Operation Copper was one of the last Z Special operations in New Guinea. The unit's mission was to paddle ashore and reconnoitre the island to determine the status of Japanese defences and validate reports that two 140 mm long-range naval guns were still in position. Intelligence suggested that these weapons were back in service and could prove dangerous during the forthcoming invasion of Wewak, as they had sufficient range to fire into the proposed landing areas and, while they would not stop the Australian invasion, they could cause significant casualties.

== Operation ==
On the night of 11 April 1945, eight men were dropped off near Muschu Island with four Hoehn military folboats (collapsible canoes) by HMAS HDML 1321 patrol boat. The eight commandos were Special Lieutenant Alan Robert Gubbay, Lieutenant Thomas Joseph Barnes, Sergeant Malcolm Francis Max Weber, Lance Corporal Spencer Henry Walklate, Signaller Michael Scott Hagger, Signaller John Richard Chandler, Private Ronald Edward Eagleton, Sapper Edgar Thomas 'Mick' Dennis.

Caught by unexpected currents, the four folboats were pushed south of their landing area and came ashore amid a surf break. All boats were swamped and some items of equipment were lost, but they got ashore and harboured up until morning. At daybreak they commenced their reconnaissance of the island, soon encountering Japanese who, unbeknownst to them, had found equipment that was washed ashore further along the island. Thus alerted, the island became a hunting ground, with almost 1,000 Japanese searching for the patrol. Attempts to communicate by radio with the HDML patrol boat failed, as their radios had been swamped and the batteries ruined.

== Aftermath ==
Of the eight men, only one survived. Sapper Mick Dennis, an experienced commando who had previously fought the Japanese in New Guinea in several significant engagements, escaped after fighting his way through Japanese patrols. He swam the channel to Wewak (a distance of over 3 km) while being pursued by the Japanese and made his way through enemy territory to eventually meet up with an Australian patrol on 20 April. The information he returned with proved vital to keeping the guns out of action and in preventing the Japanese from using the island as a launching point for attacks against the Australian forces during the Wewak landings a month later.

== Recovery of remains ==
In 2010 and 2013, expeditions to Muschu Island were conducted by MIA Australia (Missing In Action), leading to the discovery of the remains of four of the Z Special Commandos lost on the Muschu raid. On 12 June 2014, the remains of former St George first grade rugby league player, Lance Corporal Spencer Henry Walklate, and Private Ronald Eagleton, were laid to rest with full military honours at the Bomana War Cemetery just outside Port Moresby. The other five men from Operation Copper are buried at the Lae War Cemetery.

== Film ==
A film based on Don Dennis' book 'The Guns of Muschu' was announced to be in development on April 24th 2024, with a screenplay written by Tom Broadhurst and Jack Brislee to be directed by Matthew Holmes.
