= Sausalito Shipbuilding =

Shipyard in Sausalito, California, United States

Coordinates: 37°51′47.6″N 122°29′35.8″W

- Industry: Shipbuilding
- Founded: 1942
- Founder: D. F. Baker
- Defunct: 1945
- Fate: Dissolved
- Headquarters: Sausalito, California, U.S.
- Products: US Army Steel Barges
- Owner: Workers - Co-Operative

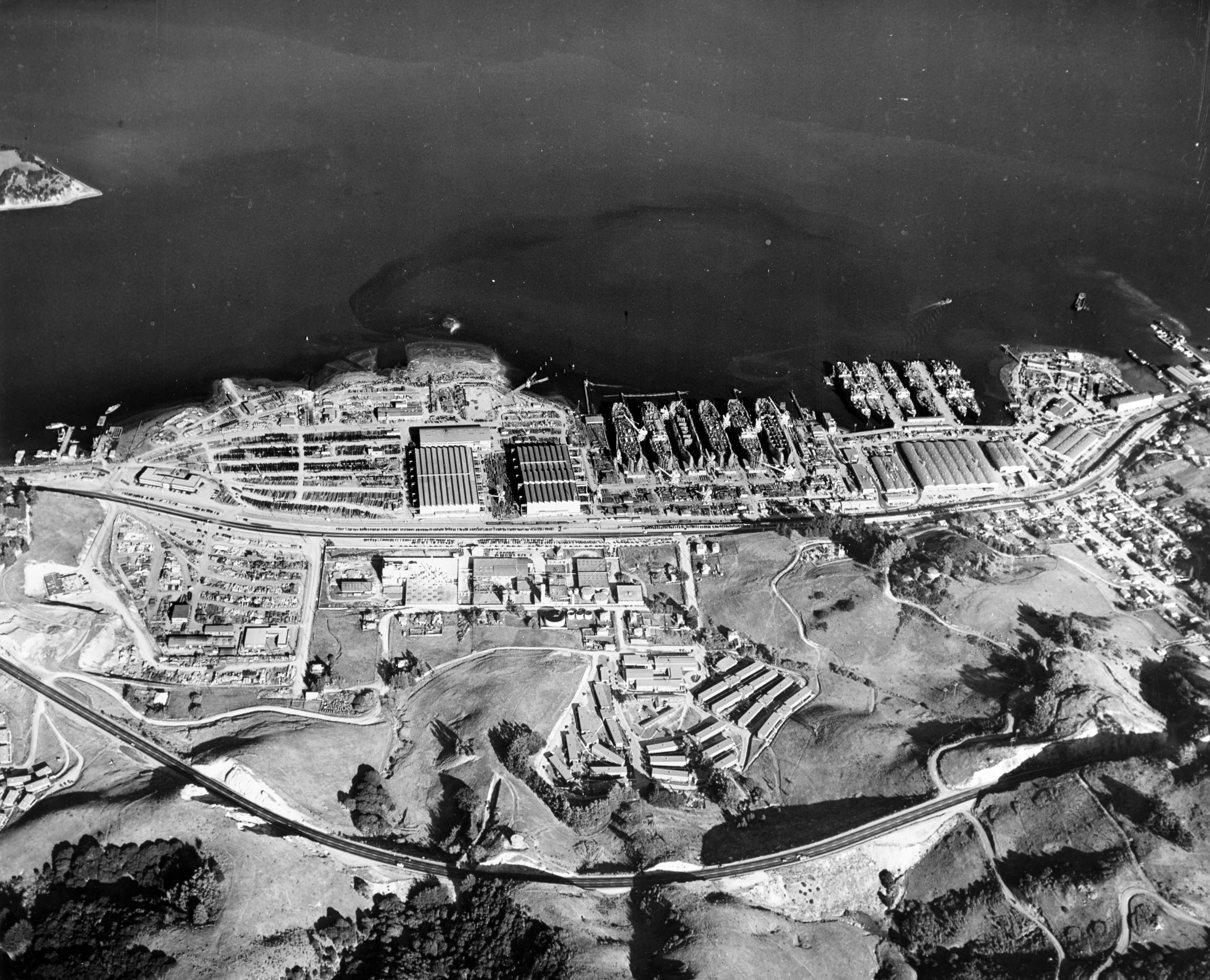
Sausalito Shipbuilding is the dock to the far right of the photo, center is Marinship in 1943

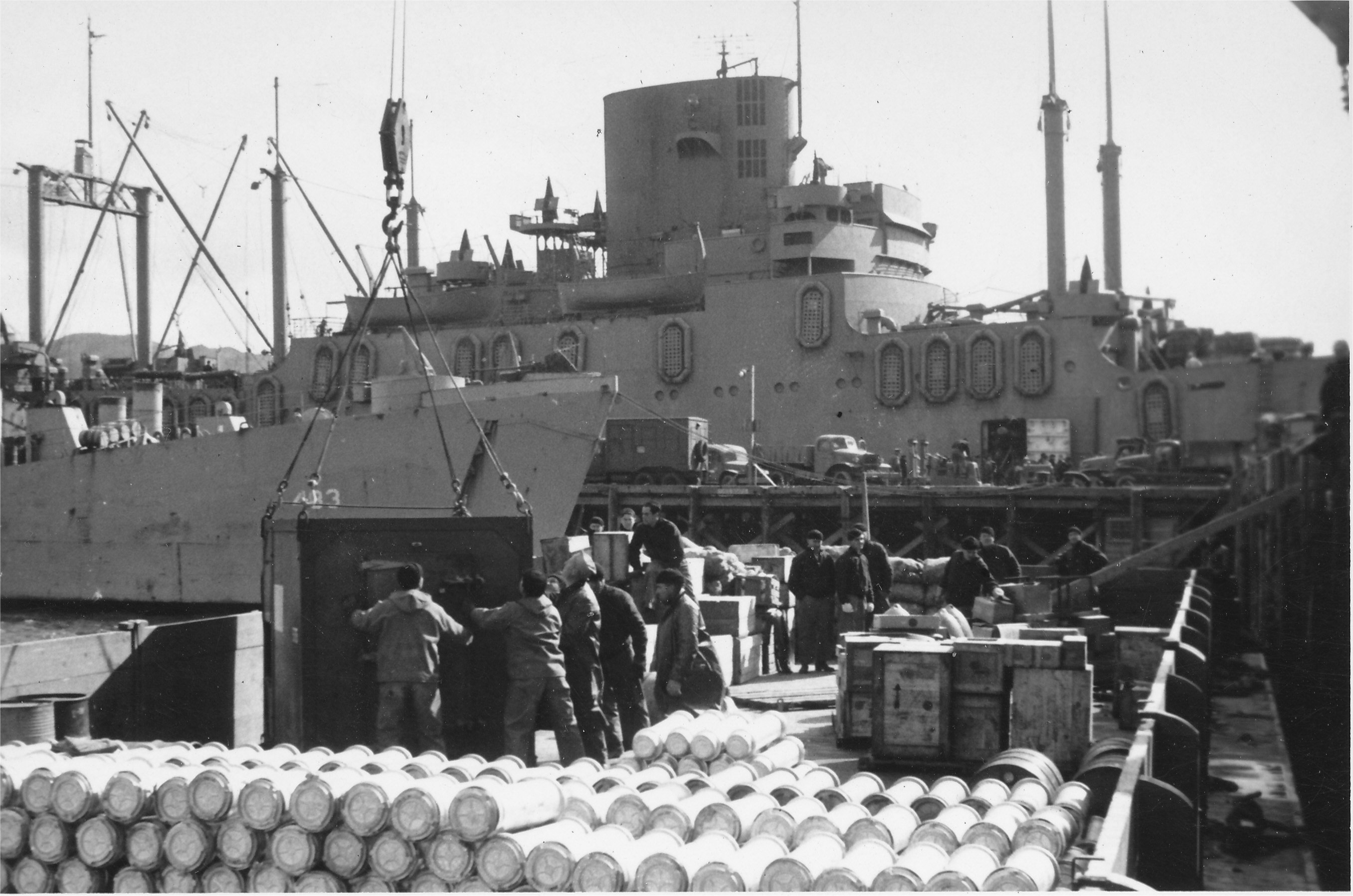
USS LST-483 loads a steel barge in 1943 at Tanaga Island

Sausalito Shipbuilding in Sausalito, California, started in 1942 as the Oakland shipbuilding Corporation. The founders had hoped to start a new shipyard in Oakland, California, but a better site opened up next to the new Marinship shipyard in Sausalito, which built Liberty ships. The site was near the former Northwestern Pacific Railroad repair yard situated at Richardson's Bay in Marin County. With World War II underway, there was a demand for more vessels, Oakland and much of the San Francisco Bay was also already built up. The shoreline in Marin County had open space to build new shipyards. At the site, the new company built 4 shipways. It had no official name while it was being built but was referred to as the "Marin Shipbuilding Division of W.A. Bechtel Company" and that lengthy title was shortened to Marin-Ship or what known today as "Marinship" with a street in Sausalito named Marinship Way. Sausalito Shipbuilding received a US Army contract to build barges. Sausalito Shipbuilding was operated as a Co-operative, each worker having a share in the company. The president was D. F. Baker, who had worked at Mare Island Naval Shipyard, Brooklyn Navy Yard and Bremerton Navy Yard. The vice president was R. E. Oberer. Tresurer was Ernent Collins. Office manager was E. G. Harris. The other key partner was Robert Rich and Stanley G. Morris. Stanley G. Morris sold his share to Rich in August 1945. The site was north end of Sausalito, California and just three miles (5 km) north of the Golden Gate Bridge. Ernent Collins was a yacht builder for years before joining the partnership. Robert Rich became the president of Sausalito Shipbuilding, later selling his share in the company and joining a dredging company that worked with Sausalito Shipbuilding. Robert Rich sold his shares to Gus Wandtke and Ernest Collins. In 1945 with the end of World War 2, like many shipyards, Sausalito Shipbuilding closed. There was a surplus of ships after the war. The site later became Sausalito houseboat community.

For the war Sausalito Shipbuilding built US Army steel Barges:

- BC-157 to BC-168, the 12 Barges were a Design # 229 and are 110 feet in length. All 12 were delivered in 1942.
- BC-803 to BC-809, the 7 Barges were a Design # 267 and are 130 feet in length. All 12 were delivered in 1943.
- BG-1193 to BG-1198 the 6 Gasoline Tank Barges were a Design # 231 and are 120 feet in length. All 6 were delivered in 1943.
- BC-2115 to BC-2128, the 15 Barges were a Design # 267 and are 130 feet in length. All 15 were delivered in 1944 and 1945.

== See also ==
- California during World War II
- Maritime history of California
- Madden and Lewis Company
