= HMAS HDML 1324 =

Australian naval vessel

History

Australia
- Builder: A.McFarlane and Sons, Birkenhead
- Commissioned: 12 June 1944

General characteristics
- Class & type: Harbour Defence Motor Launch
- Displacement: 58 tons
- Armament: 2 x 20mm 2 x machine guns 8 depth charges

HMAS HDML 1324, also known as Nepean, was a 58-ton Harbour Defence Motor Launch of the Royal Australian Navy (RAN). Built by A.McFarlane and Sons, Birkenhead, South Australia and commissioned into the RAN on 12 June 1944. She was at the Timor surrender of the Japanese occupying forces in 1945. She was later reclassified as a Seaward Defence Boat. Parts from HDML 1324 were used to refit SDB 1325.
