= HMNZS Mako =

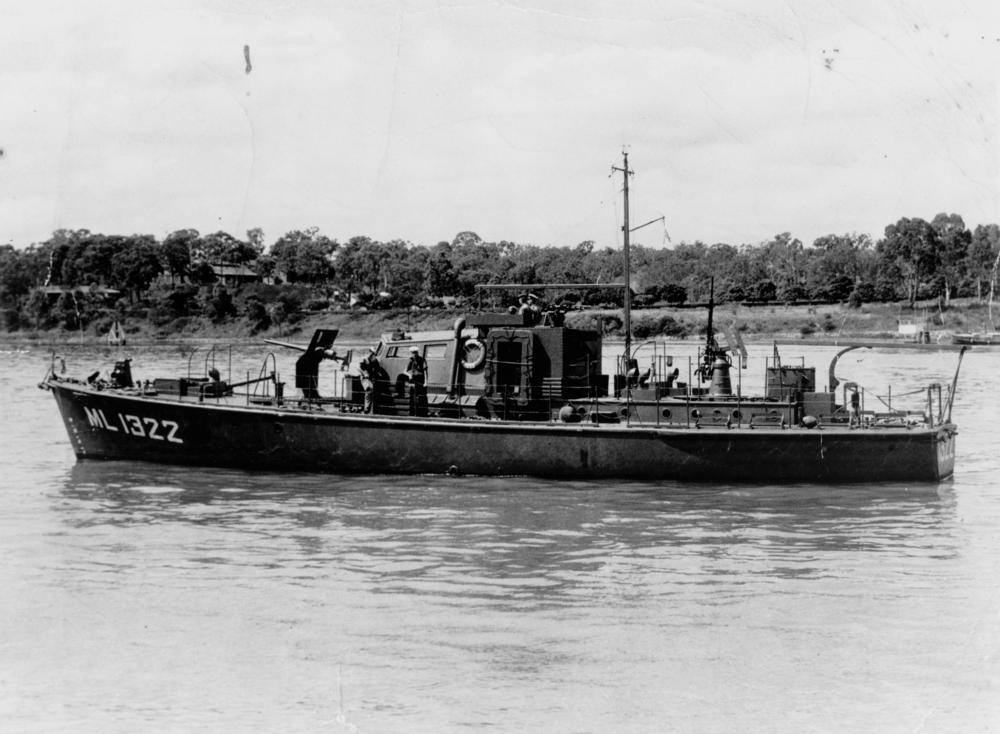
- A Harbour Defence Motor Launch

History

New Zealand
- Name: Mako
- Builder: Madden and Lewis Company, Sausalito, California.
- Launched: 11 November 1942
- Commissioned: 9 March 1943
- Decommissioned: 1975
- Status: Now located in Australia, and is privately owned

General characteristics
- Class & type: Harbour Defence Motor Launch
- Displacement: 45 tonnes, 54 tonnes full load
- Length: 22 m (72 ft 2 in); 21.3 m (69 ft 11 in) at waterline
- Beam: 4.8 m (15 ft 9 in)
- Draught: 1.6 m (5 ft 3 in)
- Propulsion: 2 × shaft Grey 6 cylinder or 2 × Hercules 6 cylinder, From 1958: 2 × Foden 12 engines, 220 bhp (160 kW) each
- Speed: 10–12 knots (19–22 km/h; 12–14 mph)
- Complement: 10 officers and ratings
- Armament: 2 × 50 cal. machineguns; 1 × 20 mm Oerlikon; 2 × twin mounted Vickers machine guns; 8 × depth charges, ASDIC
- Notes: Unarmed at peacetime

HMNZS Mako is a former Harbour Defence Motor Launch (HDML) of the Royal New Zealand Navy. Commissioned in March 1943, the ship saw service in home waters during World War II. She was built by Madden and Lewis Company in Sausalito, California.

== Construction ==
In January 1942 the British Admiralty agreed to allocate HDMLs to the Royal New Zealand Navy, with 24 ordered in February 1942. However, only 22 were supplied, 12 by the United States under Lend-Lease and 10 from Britain. The number of ships supplied from British shipyards was reduced canceled after one of the HDMLs was lost when the ship carrying it was sunk by a U-boat. The vessels were finished between November 1942 and February 1943. Such was the speed at getting these vessels into service that sea and ASDIC trials were completed before armament was fitted. The HDMLs were then transported to New Zealand on various freighters. They were to replace the NAPS vessels and were deployed to Auckland and Wellington for anti-submarine duty.

== Operational history ==
HMNZS Mako entered service on 9 March 1943 as Q1183. Q1183 arrived in New Zealand on 18 January 1943 aboard SS Frank Joseph. She was based in Auckland with the 124th Motor Launch Flotilla from April 1943 before being transferred to the 125th Flotilla for service in Dunedin. In June 1945, Q1183 arrived in Auckland scheduled for paying off and disarming, and was laid up at Pine Island; the government initially intended to dispose of the ship as surplus to requirements but Q1183 was kept in operational reserve and returned to service. In November 1945, Q1183 was selected to support the Marine Department's Fisheries Division patrols, and on 15 July 1946 Q1183 was recommissioned and for the next 28 years conducted patrols around Auckland and wider New Zealand waters. In 1948 the ship was renamed HMNZS Cook, then renamed HMNZS Maori in 1949. The RNZN also followed the Royal Navy and reclassified these ships from Harbour Defence Motor Launches to Seaward Defence Motor Launches.

In March 1950, HMNZS Maori was renumbered from Q1183 to P3551. From 21 August 1950 until 26 January 1951 HMNZS Maori was temporarily decommissioned and assigned to the "Tamaki Run", transporting men and supplies for the training base HMNZS Tamaki on Motuihe Island. Once she completed this service she resumed her fisheries patrols. In July 1955, P3551 received her final name, HMNZS Mako, the Maori word for shark. One of her significant voyages she completed in her service was a six-week tour in 1956 alongside one of her sister ships HMNZS Paea around small North Island ports. This was the first time a naval vessel had visited these ports in over 100 years. HMNZS Mako also participated in various other activities including being guard boats for royal tours and visiting warships, search and rescue and ferrying wildlife to rodent-free islands. One of her voyages she went as far south as Fiordland.

== Decommissioning and fate ==
In 1972, HMNZS Mako was transferred to the RNZNVR, before being decommissioned in 1975.
