= HMNZS Maori (P3570) =

History

New Zealand
- Laid down: 1942
- Commissioned: 1953
- Decommissioned: 1963
- Identification: IMO number: 6809745

General characteristics
- Class & type: Fairmile B class motor launch
- Displacement: 85 tons
- Length: 112 ft (34 m)
- Beam: 18 ft 3 in (5.56 m)
- Draught: 4 ft 9 in (1.45 m)
- Propulsion: Twin petrol engines totaling 1,200 bhp
- Speed: 20 knots (37 km/h; 23 mph)
- Range: 1,500 mi (1,300 nmi; 2,400 km) at 12 knots (22 km/h; 14 mph)
- Complement: 16
- Sensors & processing systems: ASDIC
- Armament: 1 × 3-lb Mk I gun 1 × twin 0.303-in Machineguns 12 depth charges
- Armour: Wheelhouse plated

HMNZS Maori (P3570) was a Fairmile B Motor Launch of the Royal New Zealand Navy

Originally commissioned on 20 December 1943 with pennant number Q 409, she was part of the 80th Motor Launch Flotilla. Early in 1944 she went to the Solomon Islands where she served under the operational control of COMSOPAC. After the end of the war she was sold.

In 1953 she was repurchased and recommissioned as HMNZS Maori (P3570).

In 1963 she was sold again and became the Auckland-Waiheke ferry Iris Moana.

== See also ==
- HMNZS Kahu (P3571)
- New Zealand Coastal Forces of World War II
