= HMAS HDML 1321 =

Australian harbour defence motor launch

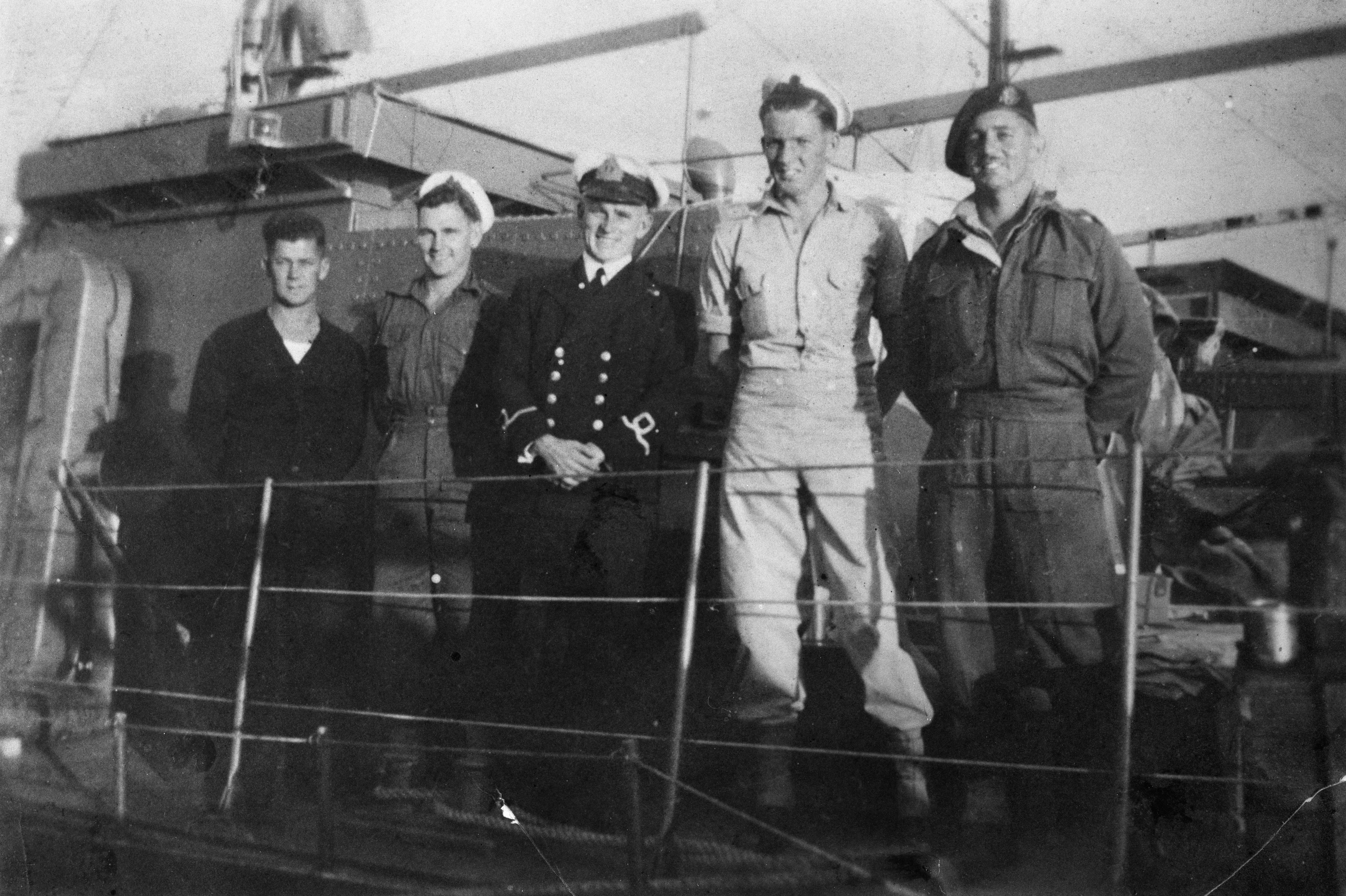
- Four of the crew members of Motor Launch (ML) 1321 and NX73110 Sapper (Spr) Edgar Thomas 'Mick' Dennis, Z Special Unit, the only survivor of the ill-fated raid on Muschu Island (off the coast of New Guinea), at Brisbane dockyard; May 1945

History

Australia
- Builder: Purdon & Featherstone, Battery Point, Tasmania
- Commissioned: 11 November 1943
- Out of service: 1970
- Renamed: HMAS Rushcutter, 1953
- Fate: Sold into civilian service in August 1971, converted to pleasure craft, operational as at May 2016.

General characteristics
- Class & type: Harbour Defence Motor Launch
- Displacement: 58 tons
- Armament: 37mm Vickers autocannon Oerlikon 20 mm cannon 2 x .50 calibre machine guns Bren light machine gun Up to 8 depth charges

HMAS HDML 1321, also known as Rushcutter, was a 58-ton Harbour Defence Motor Launch (HMDL) of the Royal Australian Navy (RAN). Built by Purdon & Featherstone, Battery Point, Hobart, Tasmania and commissioned into the RAN on 11 November 1943, being the first Australian-built HDML to be commissioned and the last HDML in RAN service. She was assigned to Z Special Unit and delivered commandos for the 1945 ill-fated raid on Muschu Island. She was later reclassified as a Seaward Defence Boat and put into reserve after the war. She was recommissioned as HMAS Rushcutter (ML 1321) in 1953 and used as an unarmed training vessel for the Royal Australian Naval Reserve and Australian Navy Cadets until 1970. Paid off in August 1971, she was converted to pleasure craft MV Rushcutter and is now based in Darwin.

Rushcutter was moved from its mooring in Cossack Creek to the Small Boat Anchorage between Stokes Hill Wharf and the East Arm Wharf in 2016 while it was being offered for sale. It sank there on 19 October 2016. The hull, without any significant deck or hull structures, was raised and landed in July 2018; the wreck was bought by the conservation group from the owner, Ms Geddes, for a nominal AU$2. In mid July 2018, it was refloated by using buoyancy assistance and pumps, then removed from the water for further preservation.
