= Australian tugboat Cambrian Salvor =

History

Australia
- Name: Cambrian Salvor
- Builder: Basalt Rock Company, Napa
- Laid down: 21 February 1942
- Launched: 7 September 42
- Completed: 20 May 1943
- Fate: Sold in 1958

History
- Name: Cambrian Salvor (1958–1962); Caribische Zee (1962–1963); Collinsea (1963–1971); Francois C (1971–1981); Ras Deira (1981)
- Owner: Island Tug and Barge, Vancouver (1958–1962)
- Fate: Scrapped in 1981.

General characteristics
- Type: Rescue and Salvage tug boat
- Tonnage: 1,334 gross tons

The Cambrian Salvor was a salvage and rescue tug that served during World War II with the Royal Australian Navy, however was never commissioned. She was sold in 1958 to Island Tug & Barge Ltd, Vancouver, before being sold in 1962 and renamed Caribische Zee, successively sold and or renamed Collinsea in 1963, Francois C in 1971 and Ras Deira in 1981.

== Fate ==
She was scrapped in 1981.
