= USS LST-285 =

1943 LST-1-class tank landing ship

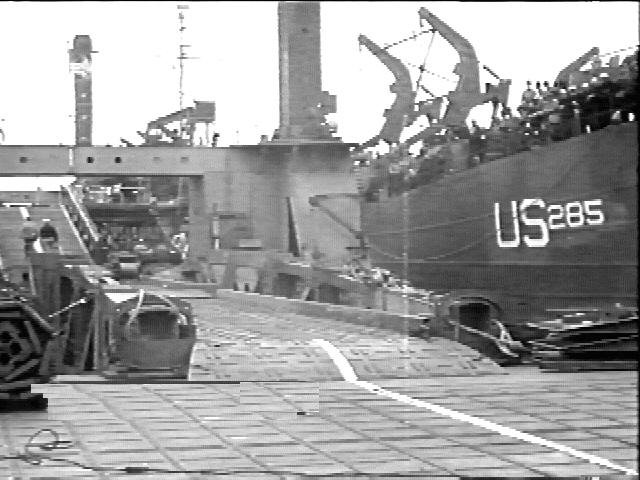
- LST-285 moored at the artificial harbor at Normandy in June 1944

History

United States
- Name: USS LST-285
- Builder: American Bridge Company, Ambridge, Pennsylvania
- Laid down: 16 August 1943
- Launched: 24 October 1943
- Sponsored by: Mrs. R. A. Shaw
- Commissioned: 13 December 1943
- Decommissioned: 27 June 1947
- Stricken: 1 August 1947
- Honours and awards: 2 battle stars for World War II service
- Fate: Sold for scrapping 26 March 1948

General characteristics
- Class & type: LST-1-class tank landing ship
- Displacement: 1,780 long tons (1,809 t) light; 3,880 long tons (3,942 t) full
- Length: 328 ft (100 m)
- Beam: 50 ft (15 m)
- Draft: Unloaded: Bow: 2 ft 4 in (0.71 m); Stern: 7 ft 6 in (2.29 m); Loaded : Bow: 8 ft 2 in (2.49 m); Stern: 14 ft 1 in (4.29 m)
- Propulsion: 2 General Motors 12-567 diesel engines, two shafts, twin rudders
- Speed: 12 knots (22 km/h; 14 mph)
- Boats & landing craft carried: Two to six LCVPs
- Troops: approx. 140 officers and enlisted
- Complement: 8-10 officers, 100-115 enlisted
- Armament: 5 × 40 mm gun mounts; 6 × 20 mm gun mounts; 2 × .50 cal (12.7 mm) machine guns; 4 × .30 cal (7.62 mm) machine guns

USS LST-285 was a United States Navy LST-1-class tank landing ship in commission from 1943 to 1947. She saw action in Europe during World War II.

== Construction and commissioning ==
LST-285 was laid down on 16 August 1943 by the American Bridge Company at Ambridge, Pennsylvania. She was launched on 24 October 1943, sponsored by Mrs. R. A. Shaw, and commissioned on 13 December 1943.

== World War II European Theater operations ==
During World War II, LST-285 was assigned to the European Theater of Operations. She participated in the Operation Overlord, the invasion of Normandy in June 1944, and in Operation Dragoon, the invasion of southern France in August and September 1944.

== Decommissioning and disposal ==
Upon her return to the United States, LST-285 was decommissioned on 27 June 1947 and stricken from the Navy List on 1 August 1947. On 26 March 1948, she was sold to the Kaiser Company, Inc., of Seattle, Washington, for scrapping.

== Awards ==
LST-285 earned two battle stars for World War II service.

== See also ==
- List of United States Navy LSTs
