= HMS Medusa (A353) =

Harbour defence motor launch of the Royal Navy

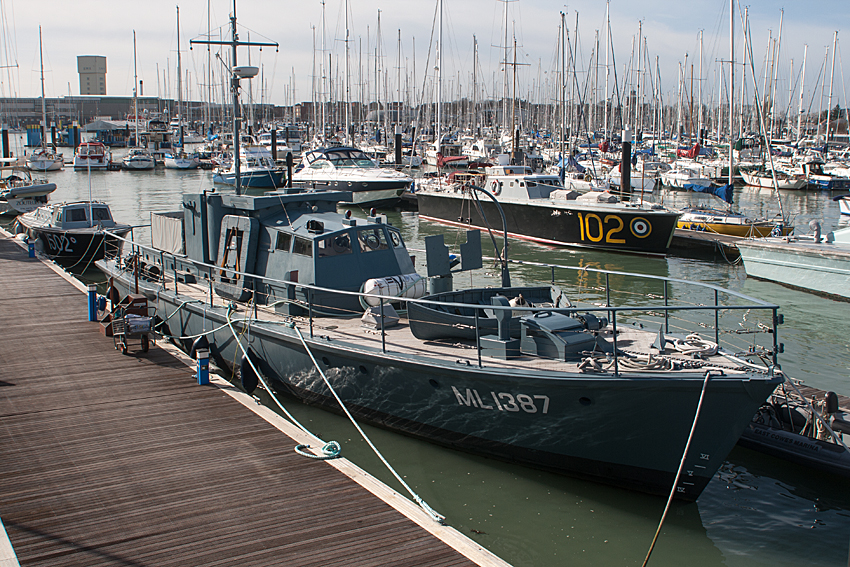
- HMS Medusa at Haslar Marina

History

United Kingdom
- Name: Medusa
- Builder: Newman, R A & Sons Ltd, Poole
- Laid down: 27 July 1943
- Launched: 20 October 1943
- Commissioned: 29 December 1943
- Out of service: 1965
- Fate: Sold in 1968
- Status: Museum ship

General characteristics
- Class & type: Harbour defence motor launch
- Displacement: 56.00 tons
- Length: 72.06 ft (21.96 m)
- Beam: 16.66 ft (5.08 m)
- Propulsion: 2 x Gardner 8L3 marine engines
- Speed: 12.5 knots (23.2 km/h; 14.4 mph)
- Range: 2,000 mi (1,700 nmi; 3,200 km) at 10 knots (19 km/h; 12 mph)(1,650 gallons)
- Complement: 2 officers, 2 petty officers and 8 ratings
- Armament: 1 x 2 pounder gun 1 x 20mm Oerlikon 2 x Vickers K machine guns

HMS Medusa (A353) (formerly HDML 1387) is a harbour defence motor launch of the Royal Navy that saw service in World War II, constructed by Newman, R A & Sons Ltd, Poole in 1943.

== Service history ==
HDML 1387 took part in exercise Fabius 1 in May 1944, which consisted of practise amphibious landings at Slapton Sands, Devon. She later served at D-Day as a Navigation Leader, marking German minefields to be cleared by minesweepers, and then staying at the entrance of the cleared channel to direct parts of the invasion force. In 1945, she patrolled near Scheveningen, Netherlands and accepted the surrender of German forces at Ijmuiden.

== Postwar ==
After World War II, she received a refit and was converted into a Fast Despatch Boat, being renamed FDB 76. In 1946, she became a training ship at Cardiff University Naval Division. In 1947, she was transferred to Severn Division RNVR Unit, and she was again transferred in 1949 to London Division RNVR. After her move to London Division RNVR, she was renamed SDML 3516. She was converted into a hydrographic survey vessel in 1961, receiving the name HMS Medusa (A353).

Medusa was paid off on 30 November 1965 at Devonport, sustaining damage from a fire that started on the final day of her service in the Royal Navy. She was sold in 1968, and became privately owned. A restoration in 1972 included repairs to the ship's hull and superstructure, and she visited Omaha Beach and Juno Beach in 1994 to commemorate the 50th anniversary of D-Day. In 2003, a charity called The Medusa Trust was created to preserve the ship. She was also listed on the National Register of Historic Ships in 2003. Medusa has been present at events such as the Fleet Review marking the 200th anniversary of the Battle of Trafalgar in 2005, and the Diamond Jubilee Pageant in 2012.

Medusa is based at Haslar Marina, Gosport.

== See also ==
- MTB 102
