= Kulmerland (ship) =

German cargo liner and Second World War naval supply ship

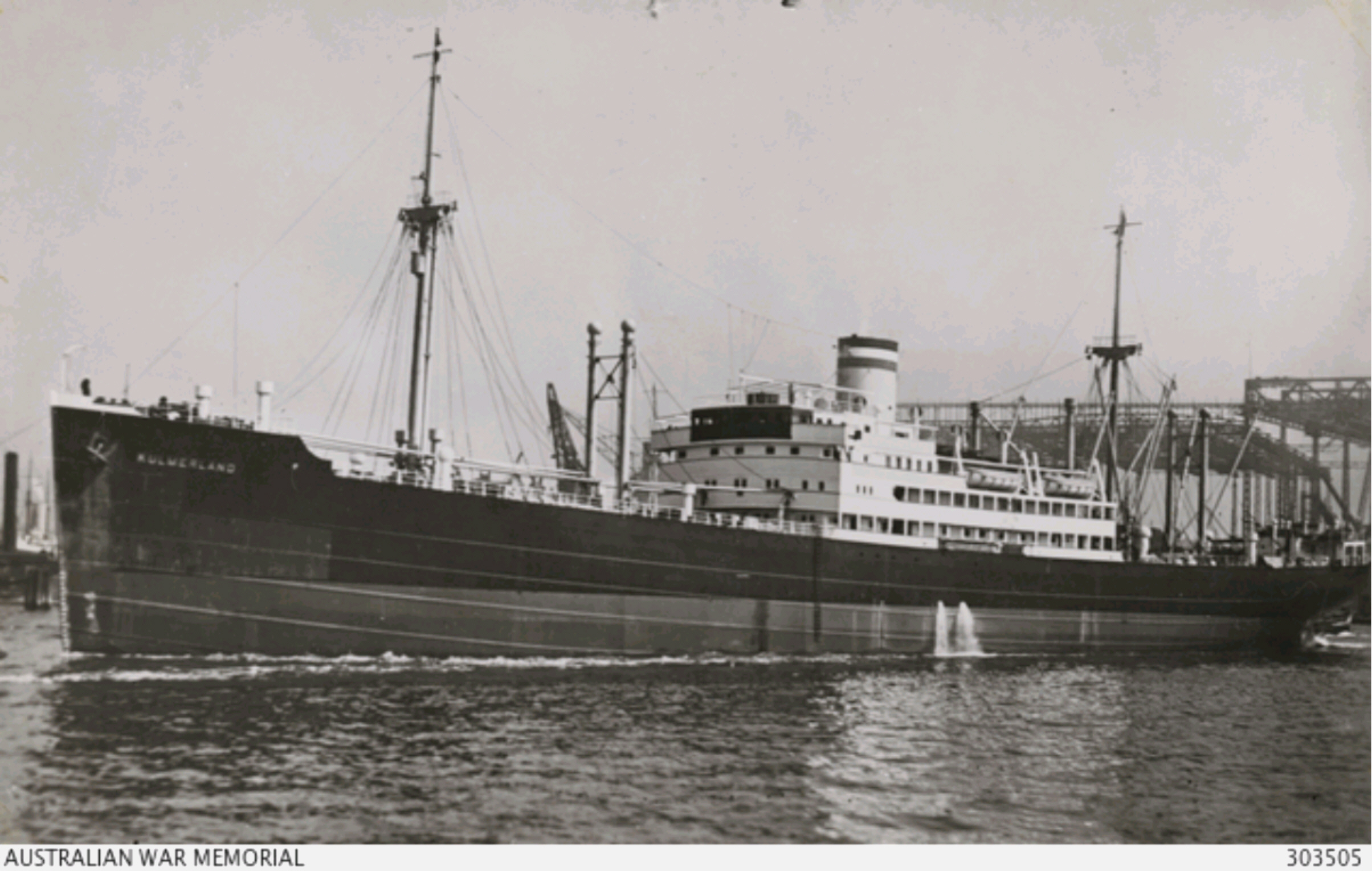
- Kulmerland in Hamburg

History

Germany
- Name: Kulmerland
- Namesake: Kulmerland, now Chełmno Land
- Owner: Hamburg America Line
- Port of registry: Hamburg
- Builder: Deutsche Werft, Hamburg
- Yard number: 109
- Launched: 1 August 1928
- Completed: 16 March 1929
- Identification: 1929: code letters RHDS; 1934: call sign DICW
- Fate: scuttled 1944; scrapped 1950

General characteristics
- Type: cargo liner
- Tonnage: 7,363 GRT, 4,367 NRT
- Length: 463.6 ft (141.3 m)
- Beam: 60.1 ft (18.3 m)
- Depth: 28.0 ft (8.5 m)
- Decks: 2
- Installed power: 1,585 NHP
- Propulsion: 1 × two-stroke diesel engine; 1 × screw
- Speed: 13 knots (24 km/h)
- Sensors & processing systems: submarine signalling; wireless direction finding; by 1937: echo sounding device

Kulmerland was a Hamburg America Line (HAPAG) cargo liner that was launched in 1928. She worked HAPAG's route between Hamburg and the Far East until 1939. In the Second World War she was a supply ship for German auxiliary cruisers in the Pacific and Indian Oceans. In 1942 she became a successful blockade runner to German-occupied Europe. An Allied air raid on German-occupied France in 1943 put her out of action. German forces sank her as a blockship in 1944. She was raised in 1945 after the Liberation of France, and scrapped in 1950.

This was the first of two HAPAG ships named after Kulmerland in West Prussia, which is now Chełmno Land in Poland. The second Kulmerland was a motor ship that was completed in 1961, and sold and renamed in 1971.

== Building and identification ==
In 1928 and 1929 HAPAG took delivery of a class of five cargo liners from three German shipyards. Their dimensions were similar to those of Seattle and Oakland, but the layout of their hatches and derricks was slightly different, and they lacked refrigeration equipment. Deutsche Werft in Hamburg built Leverkusen, Duisburg, and Kulmerland. Flensburger Schiffbau-Gesellschaft built Burgenland, and Schichau-Werke in Danzig (now Gdańsk) built Sauerland. Burgenland and Sauerland had slightly shallower hulls, but the five ships were sisters in a single class.

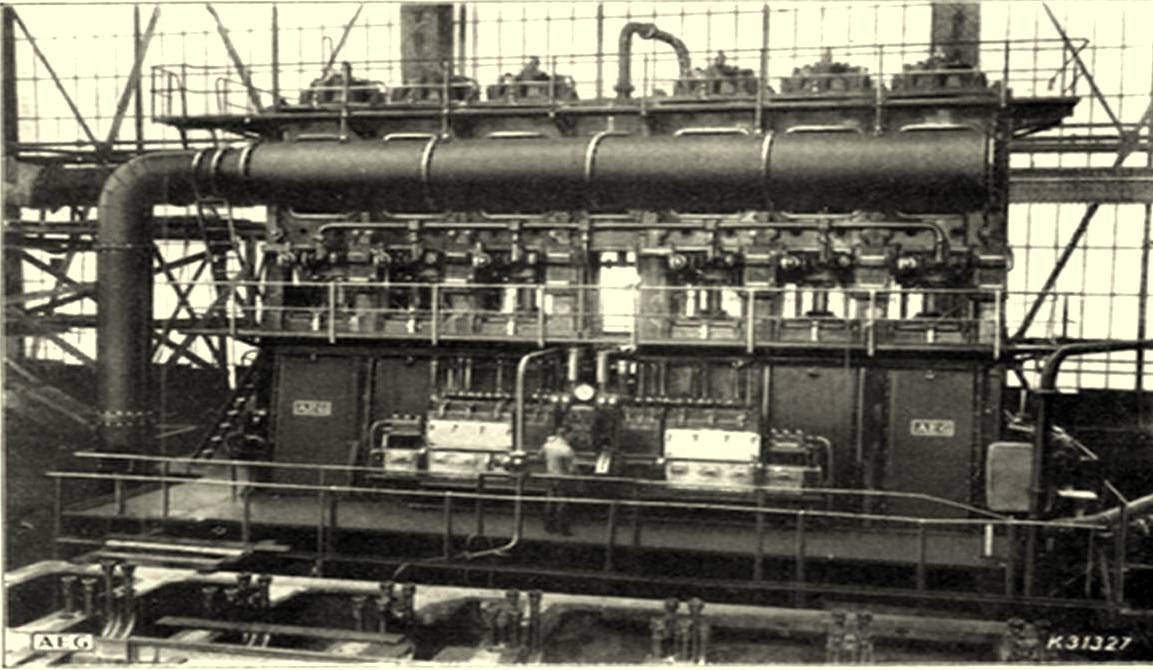
An AEG six-cylinder two-stroke diesel engine

Deutsche Werft launched Kulmerland on 1 August 1928 and completed her on 16 March 1929. Her registered length was 463.6 ft (141.3 m), her beam was 60.1 ft (18.3 m), and her depth was 28.0 ft (8.5 m). Her tonnages were 7,363 GRT and 4,367 NRT. Kulmerland had a single screw, driven by an AEG six-cylinder two-stroke diesel engine. It was rated at 1,585 NHP and gave her a speed of 13 knots (24 km/h).

HAPAG registered Kulmerland in Hamburg. Her code letters were RHDS. By 1934 her wireless telegraph call sign was DICW, and this had superseded her code letters. Kulmerland's navigation equipment included submarine signalling and wireless direction finding. By 1937 it also included an echo sounding device.

== Selonija rescue ==
On 19 April 1932 the Latvian cargo ship Selonija caught fire and sank in the North Atlantic off the west coast of Galicia at position 41°56′N 9°31′W. Kulmerland rescued all her crew.

== Fernost-Verband supply ship ==
Kulmerland was in Japan when the invasion of Poland began the Second World War. On 4 October 1940 she left Kobe disguised as the Japanese ship Tokyo Maru, carrying fuel oil and other supplies to replenish the auxiliary cruisers Komet and Orion. At sea she met Komet, which was disgiused as the Japanese ship Manyo Maru, and had just reached the Pacific via the Northeast Passage and the Bering Strait. The pair met Orion and her supply ship Regensburg at Lamotrek atoll in the Caroline Islands on 18 October.

Patrols of the Fernost-Verband, December 1940 to January 1941

Regensburg left for Japan, but on 20 October Kulmerland and the two auxiliary cruisers left Lamotrek to patrol the Pacific shipping lanes. Together the trio were called the Fernost-Verband. For weeks they found no Allied merchant ships. Then on 25 November Komet stopped the small New Zealand-registered steamship Holmwood, captured its crew and passengers, and sank the steamship by gunfire. On 27 November Orion shelled and stopped the New Zealand Shipping Company liner Rangitane, captured its 296 surviving crew and passengers, and then sank the ship by torpedo and shellfire. On 29 November the Fernost-Verband reached the Kermadec Islands, where they redistributed their prisoners of war (PoWs) and civilian internees between them. Kulmerland's captives now included 39 women and five children.

The Fernost-Verband headed for Nauru, to attack Allied cargo ships carrying phosphorite from the island. On 6 December Orion shelled, captured and torpedoed the British Phosphate Commission (BPC) steamship Triona, capturing 61 surviving crew, six women passengers, and a child. Some of the survivors were transferred to Kulmerland. On 7 December Komet sank the Norwegian motor ship Vinni. On 8 December Orion sank the BPC motor ships Triadic and Triaster, and Komet sank the Union Steam Ship Company steamship Komata. The Fernost-Verband now had 675 PoWs and civilian internees. 257 of them, including 52 women and six children, were aboard Kulmerland.

On 12–13 December Kulmerland refuelled Komet at Ailinglaplap Atoll. The Fernost-Verband then went west to Emirau in the Bismarck Archipelago, where on 21 December Kulmerland refuelled Orion and the Germans disembarked 514 captives. Komet then headed south to Rabaul, while Kulmerland and Orion headed north to the Maug Islands, where they parted company. Orion headed for the Indian Ocean, while Kulmerland returned to Japan, where she arrived on 31 December.

== Kormoran and France ==
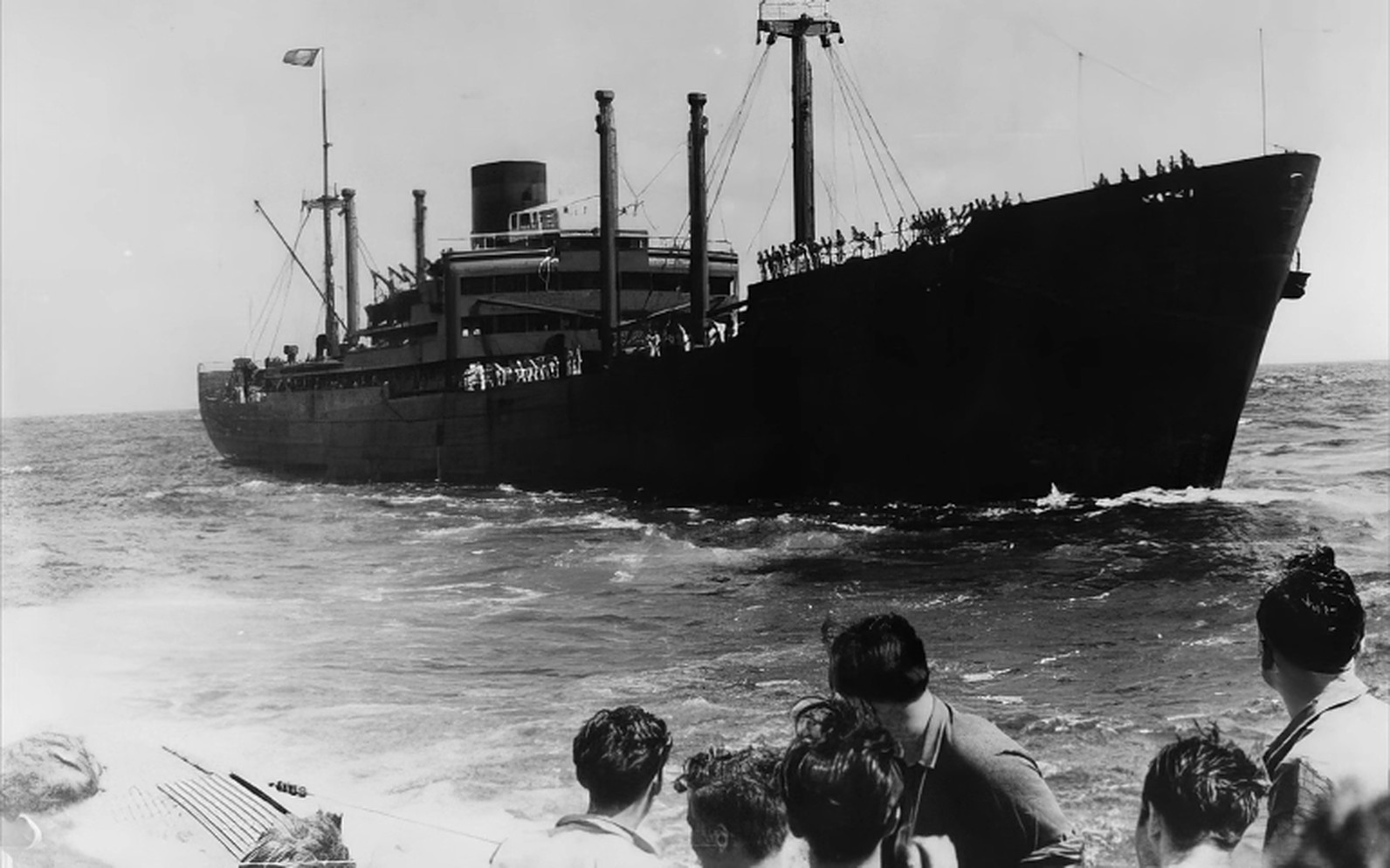
The German auxiliary cruiser Kormoran

On 3 September 1941 Kulmerland left Kobe carrying fuel oil, supplies, and white metal engine parts for the German auxiliary cruiser Kormoran. The two ships met at sea on the Indian Ocean west of Australia on 16 October. The two ships sailed together until 24 October. Kormoran transferred to Kulmerland 86 PoWs and internees, plus five German sailors to guard them.

Kulmerland then headed for Japan. At sea on 17 November she met HAPAG's Spreewald, to which she transferred her PoWs and internees. Spreewald was en route to try to reach German-occupied Europe through the Allied blockade.

Kulmerland went to Manchukuo and loaded cargo for Germany's war effort. On 26 August 1942 she left Dairen (now Dalian) to try to reach occupied Europe. She went via the Cape of Good Hope, and on 7 November she reached Bordeaux in German-occupied France.

In 1943 Kulmerland moved north from Bordeaux to Nantes. On 23 September 1943 an Allied air raid rendered her unseaworthy. When German forces withdrew from Nantes in August 1944, they scuttled her in the Loire as a blockship.

In 1945 her wreck was raised. Compagnie Générale Transatlantique considered having her refitted, but she was beyond economic repair. In 1950 she was towed to Briton Ferry in Wales, where she was scrapped.

== Bibliography ==
- Frame, Tom (1993). HMAS Sydney: Loss and Controversy. Rydalmere: Hodder & Stoughton. ISBN 0-340-58468-8. OCLC 32234178.
- Haws, Duncan (1980). The Ships of the Hamburg America, Adler and Carr Lines. Merchant Fleets in Profile. Vol. 4. Cambridge: Patrick Stephens Ltd. ISBN 0-85059-397-2.
- Kludas, Arnold (1989). Vernichtung und Wiedergeburt 1914 bis 1930. Die Geschichte der deutschen Passagierschiffahrt (in German). Vol. IV. Hamburg: Ernst Kabel Verlag. ISBN 978-3822500408.
- Lloyd's Register of Shipping (PDF). Vol. II.–Steamers and Motorships of 300 tons gross and over. London: Lloyd's Register of Shipping. 1930 – via Southampton City Council.
- Lloyd's Register of Shipping (PDF). Vol. II.–Steamers and Motorships of 300 tons gross and over. London: Lloyd's Register of Shipping. 1934 – via Southampton City Council.
- Lloyd's Register of Shipping (PDF). Vol. II.–Steamers and Motorships of 300 tons gross and over. London: Lloyd's Register of Shipping. 1937 – via Southampton City Council.
- Waters, Sydney D (1949). German Raiders in the Pacific. The Official History of New Zealand in the Second World War 1939–1945. Vol. Episodes and Studies, 1. Wellington: War History Branch, Department of Internal Affairs – via New Zealand Electronic Text Collection.
- Waters, Sydney D (1956). The Royal New Zealand Navy. The Official History of New Zealand in the Second World War 1939–1945. Wellington: War History Branch, Department of Internal Affairs – via New Zealand Electronic Text Collection.
- Winter, Barbara (1984). HMAS Sydney: Fact, Fantasy and Fraud. Spring Hill: Boolarong Publications. ISBN 0-908175-72-8. OCLC 11783441.
