= HMNZS Puriri =

Coastal cargo ship requisitioned by the Royal New Zealand Navy

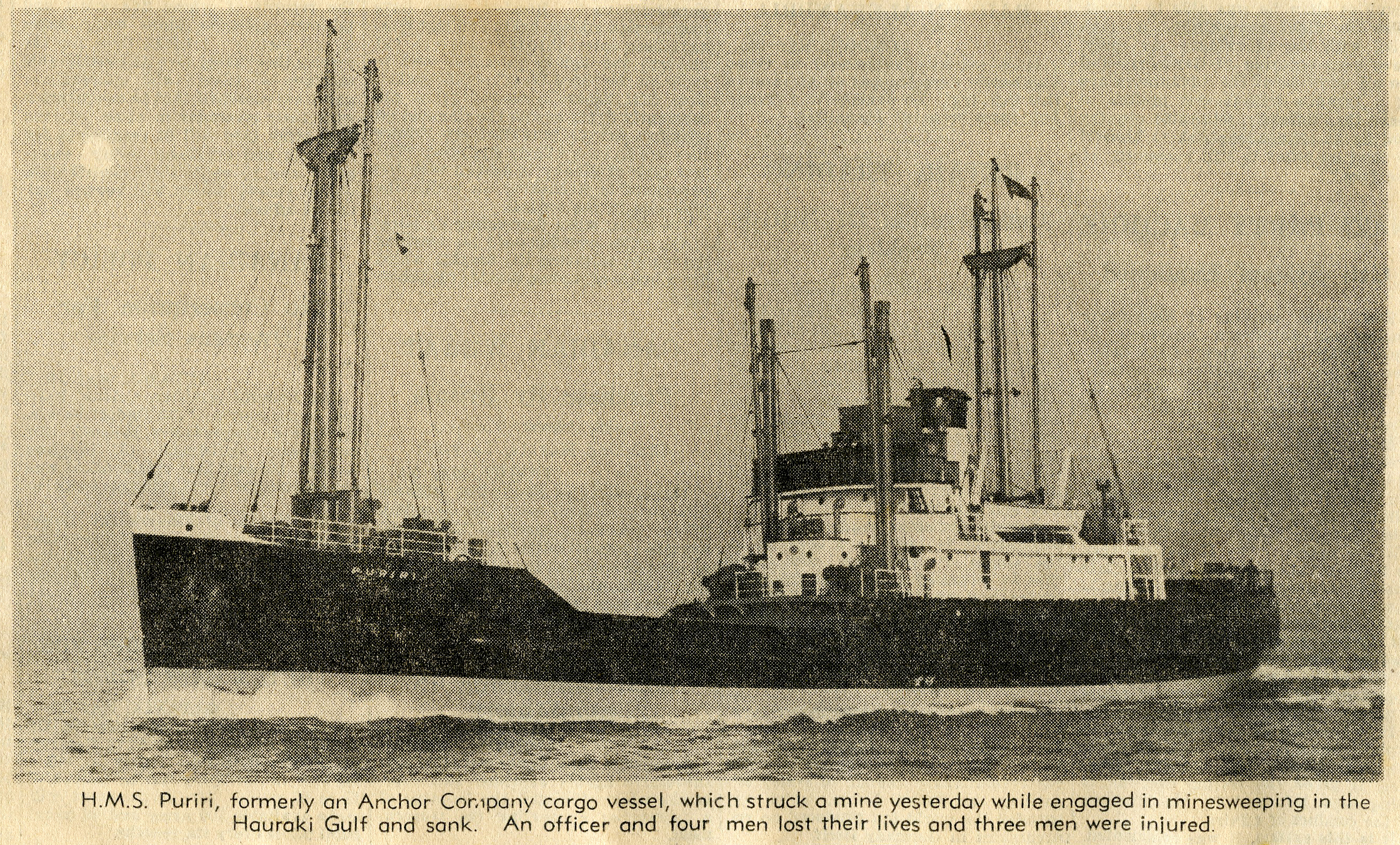

History

New Zealand
- Name: Puriri
- Builder: Henry Robb Ltd., Leith, Scotland
- Yard number: 273
- Launched: 25 October 1938
- Commissioned: 19 April 1941
- Identification: Pennant number: T02
- Fate: Sunk by a mine, 14 May 1941

General characteristics
- Tonnage: 927 GRT; 423 NRT
- Length: 57.4 m (188 ft 4 in)
- Beam: 10.7 m (35 ft 1 in)
- Propulsion: Diesel engines, 740 bhp (550 kW), two shafts
- Speed: 8.5 to 10 knots (15.7 to 18.5 km/h; 9.8 to 11.5 mph)
- Complement: 32
- Armament: 4 in (100 mm) gun; Lewis machine guns; Depth charges

HMNZS Puriri (T02) was a coastal cargo ship which was requisitioned by the Royal New Zealand Navy (RNZN) and converted into a minesweeper. She was sunk by a German naval mine 25 days after she was commissioned.

== Operational history ==
Puriri was owned by the Anchor Shipping and Foundry Company. She was one of four ships requisitioned as a consequence of the Orion's minefield and the loss of the ocean liner Niagara, the others being Matai, Gale and Rata. Puriri was taken over on 20 November 1940 and handed to the dockyard for conversion.

On 27 November 1940, Puriri put to sea urgently to assist the cruiser HMNZS Achilles in the search for the raiders Orion and Komet, which had sunk the liner Rangitane. She returned to port three days later and resumed conversion.

She was commissioned on 19 April 1941, and assigned to the 25th Minesweeping Flotilla, which was assigned to sweep German mines in the Hauraki Gulf.

== Fate ==
On 13 May 1941, the launch Rawea attached a buoy to a German mine that had been caught in a fishing net eight miles (13 km) north-east of Bream Head. Puriri and Gale were sent to deactivate it, and arrived in the area the next day. Gale sailed past the mine without seeing it, but Puriri, also not seeing the mine, struck it at 11 am. The explosion caused the ship to immediately sink at 35°46′15″S 174°43′00″E and now lies at a depth of 98 metres (322 ft). Of the 31 aboard, five were killed or drowned, and three seamen were injured, one seriously. Gale rescued the 26 survivors.

The cargo boat Breeze was requisitioned as a replacement for Puriri.

== See also ==
- Minesweepers of the Royal New Zealand Navy
