= Doris Beeston =

(1897–1940) kindergarten teacher

Doris Anne Beeston
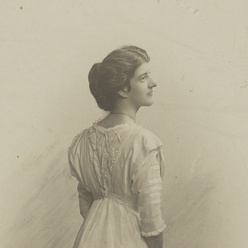
- Born: 22 September 1897; Shire of Hindmarsh
- Died: 26 November 1940 (aged 43); Pacific Ocean on board MS Rangitane
- Education: Adelaide Kindergarten Training College
- Occupation: Pre-school teacher

Doris Anne Beeston (1897 – 1940) was an Australian kindergarten teacher. She was a leading figure in the Australian Kindergarten movement. During the second world war she volunteered to be an escort to British children who were emigrating to avoid the conflict. In 1940 she was aboard the MS Rangitane (1929) when it was fired on by German auxiliary cruiser Orion. Ten people died including Beeston. Her memorial included a kindergarten building.

== Life ==
Beeston was born in 1897 in Shire of Hindmarsh in Victoria. Her married parents were Anne Japp (born Boath) and John Spencer Beeston - who was a clerk. She was educated at the local schools and in 1915 she enrolled at the Adelaide Kindergarten Training College where she was taught the latest ideas based on the work of Montessori. The new methods had been brought to the college by Lillian Daphne de Lissa from Sydney. Beeston did well and left in 1917 with a first class pass. In the following year she worked in Adelaide directing and expanded the social work delivered by the Franklin Street Free Kindergarten Training Centre for Students to the local children and parents.

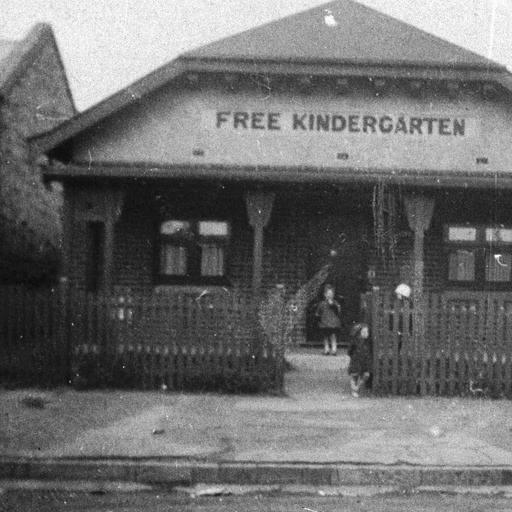
Franklin Street Free Kindergarten, in Adelaide 1917

In 1922 she joined Helen Jenkins at the Kindergarten she had created in the Sydney suburb of Croydon. She was there until 1924 when she became the first paid general secretary of the South Australian Kindergarten Union where she worked with Ethel McDonnell and Lucy Morice. One of her tasks was to raise money which she did with her friend Constance Jean Bonython.

In 1937 she was awarded the Catherine Helen Spence Memorial Scholarship to enable her to further her study into parent education and child welfare. In 1939 she travelled to Britain and France to attend lectures on early childhood and to visit nursery schools and kindergartens.

Also in 1939, the Second World War began, and in response to the threat of war, the British Children's Overseas Reception Board, a government sponsored organisation, was created to arrange the emigration of British children to other parts of the British Empire. Beeston volunteered to be an escort for 477 British children who were leaving Liverpool on 1 August 1940 on MS Batory. She looked after 16 boys aged 7 to 14 for the ten-week voyage to Adelaide on 14 October. The regular concerts, and a later book, named the Batory as "The Singing Ship". Beeston and the other escorts enjoyed two weeks back in her country before they were recalled to Britain. They set sail back to Australia on the MS Rangitane.

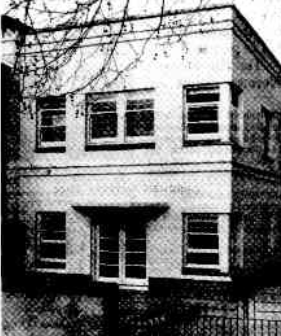
The Doris Beeston Memorial Kindergarten

== Death and legacy ==
Beeston died aboard the MS Rangitane 300 miles off East Cape in the Pacific Ocean on 26 November 1940. The Rangitane spotted German raiders at 3:40 in the morning and they sent out a radio message to announce they had found suspicious ships. The German auxiliary cruiser Orion ordered the Rangitane to stop and to not use its radio. For 19 minutes the Rangitane engaged its top speed and during this time the German fire killed three engine staff, two stewardesses and five passengers. Beeston was among the dead.

In 1941 the Australian Minister for Education, Shirley Jeffries, opened a state of the art Doris Beeston Memorial Kindergarten at North Adelaide's Kindergarten Training College. which was paid for by public subscription. The building served for twenty years until in 1961 it moved to larger premises.
