= HMNZS Gale =

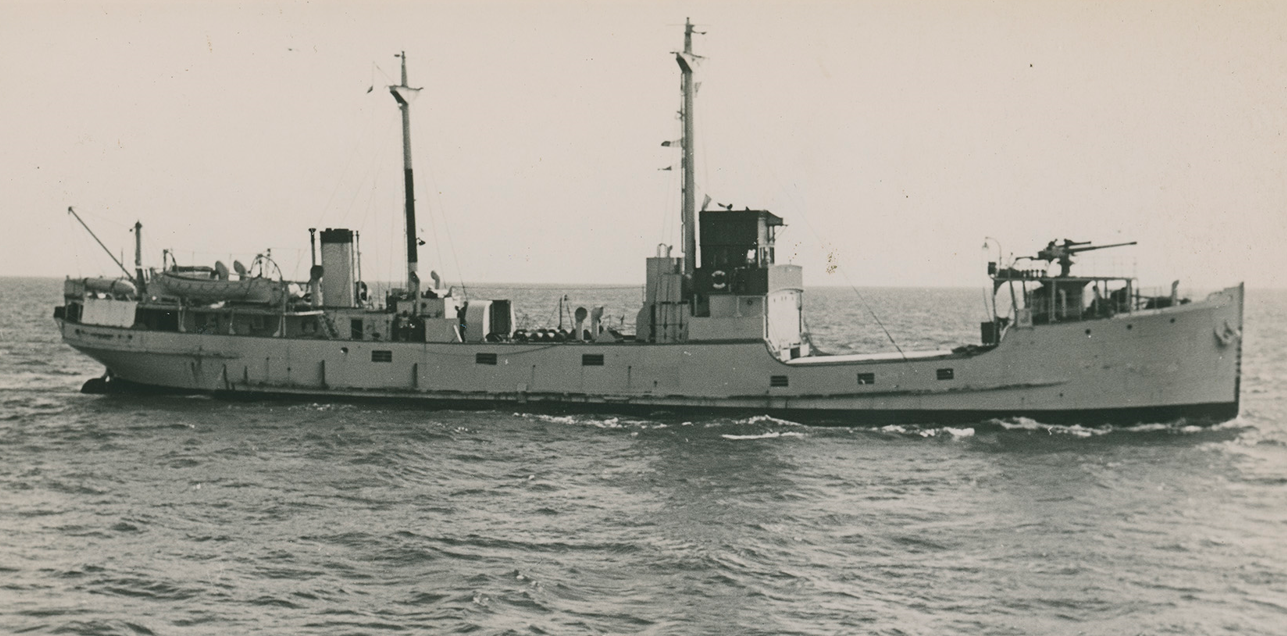
- Gale in the early 1940s

History

New Zealand
- Name: HMNZS Gale (T04)
- Builder: Scott & Sons, Bowling
- Yard number: 331
- Launched: 1 August 1935
- Completed: September 1935
- Commissioned: 3 April 1941
- Decommissioned: 26 October 1944
- Identification: UK official number: 132528
- Fate: Returned to owner 1944

General characteristics
- Tonnage: 622 GRT; 317 NRT
- Length: 179 ft 6 in (54.71 m)
- Beam: 30 ft 1 in (9.17 m)
- Draught: 12 ft 4 in (3.76 m)
- Propulsion: British Auxiliaries Ltd. diesel engines, 725 bhp, one shaft
- Speed: 10 to 11 knots (19 to 20 km/h; 12 to 13 mph)
- Complement: 42
- Sensors & processing systems: Asdic; Radar
- Armament: 1 × 4 in (100 mm) gun; 2 × 20 mm Oerlikons; 2 × Lewis machine guns; 50 depth charges

HMNZS Gale (T04) was a coastal cargo boat which was requisitioned by the Royal New Zealand Navy (RNZN) and converted into a minesweeper. She was the first New Zealand vessel to go into action against Japan.

Gale was owned by the Canterbury Steam Shipping Company. She was one of four ships requisitioned as a consequence of the Orion's minefield and the loss of the liner Niagara, the others being Matai, Puriri and Rata. She was taken over on 10 October 1940 and handed to the dockyard for conversion. She was a sister ship to Breeze.

== Operational history ==
Gale joined the 25th Minesweeping Flotilla in April 1941, sweeping for German mines in the Hauraki Gulf. On 14 May, she rescued the survivors of the Puriri sinking. Later in 1941, the flotilla swept suspected minefield areas such as near Cuvier Island and Farewell Spit. In December 1941 Gale detached to relieve Viti in Fiji. She returned to New Zealand for refit in February 1942.

In June 1942, Gale was deployed to Noumea for port minesweeping duties where she was the first New Zealand vessel to deploy with COMSOPAC, the United States Navy's South Pacific Command, then taking over command of the 25th Minesweeping Flotilla. On 5 August, Gale located a missing US amphibious aircraft, rescued the crew, and towed it back to Noumea. The ship subsequently received a US commendation. Gale sailed back to New Zealand on 30 October 1942; she was then assigned to Wellington as a port minesweeper with the Second Minesweeping Group.

In February 1943, Gale rejoined the 25th Minesweeping Flotilla at Tulagi in the Solomons. In April 1943, her sister ship Breeze arrived at Tulagi, at which point Gale, Breeze and Matai were formed into the 9th Auxiliary Minesweeping group. They carried out night-time patrol and escort duties under COMSOPAC control. The Japanese were largely well to the north by this time, but occasionally made sudden attacks into American strongholds around Guadalcanal.

From time to time flotilla boats would return to Auckland for refit, usually escorting freighters bound the same way. By mid-1944, the owners were demanding the return of Gale and her twin Breeze. COMSOPAC released her on 20 September 1944.

== Fate ==
Gale was sold by Canterbury Steam Shipping Company in December 1962 to Cia de Transportes Sylvia S.A. of Panama and renamed Jasa. She was scrapped in Singapore in 1970.

== See also ==
- Minesweepers of the Royal New Zealand Navy
