= HMNZS Breeze =

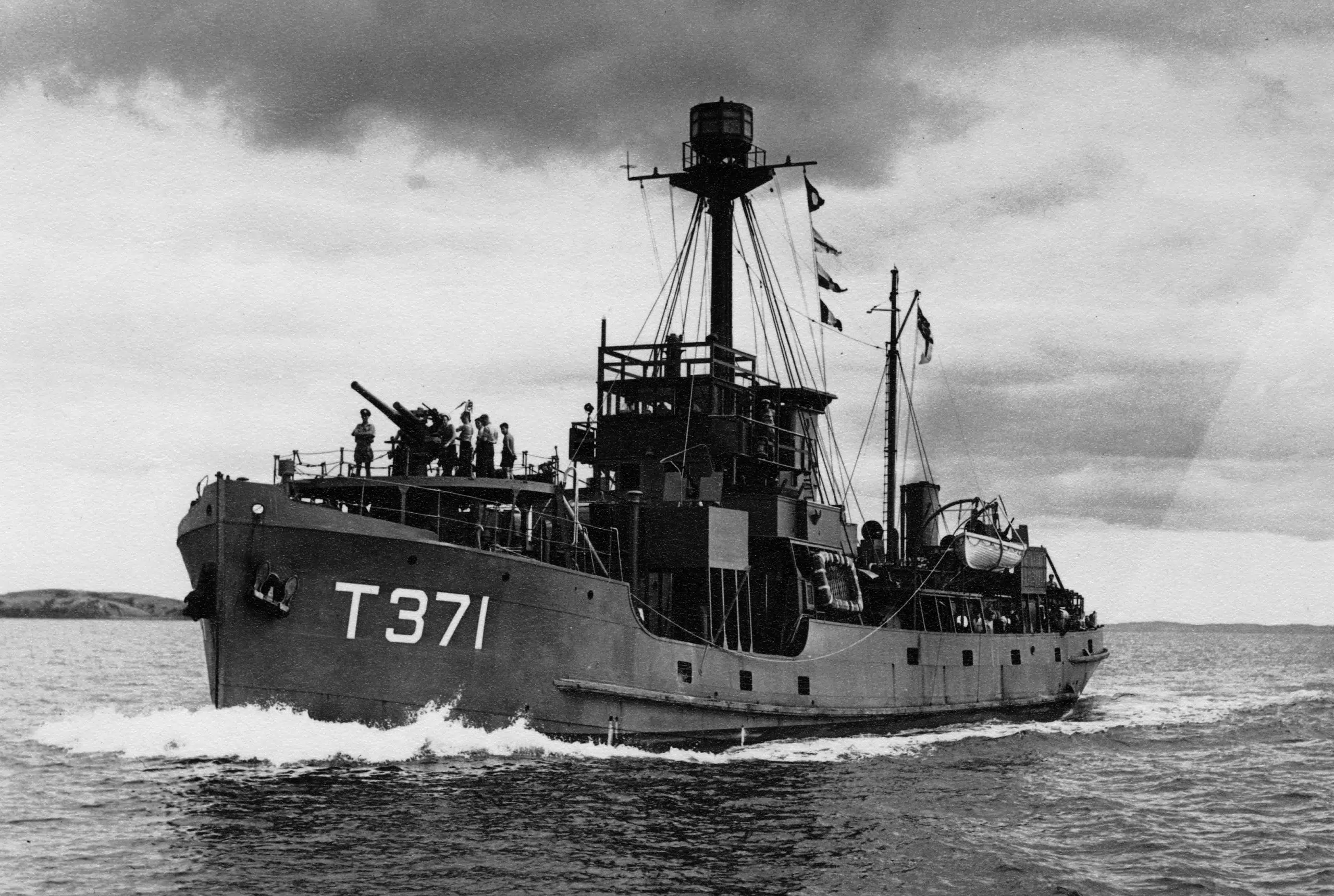
- Breeze as a minesweeper

History

New Zealand
- Name: HMNZS Breeze (T02)
- Builder: Scott and Sons, Glasgow
- Launched: 5 October 1933
- Acquired: 3 March 1942
- Commissioned: 24 October 1942
- Decommissioned: 8 December 1944
- Fate: Returned to owner 1944

General characteristics
- Tonnage: 622 GRT, 317 NRT
- Length: 53.4 m (175 ft)
- Beam: 8.2 m (27 ft)
- Propulsion: diesel, 725 bhp, one shaft
- Speed: 10 to 11 knots (19 to 20 km/h; 12 to 13 mph)
- Complement: 42
- Sensors & processing systems: asdic, radar
- Armament: 1 × 4 inch gun, 2 × 20mm Oerlikons, 2 Lewis machine guns, 50 depth charges

HMNZS Breeze (T02) was a coastal cargo boat which was requisitioned by the Royal New Zealand Navy (RNZN) and converted into a minesweeper.

Breeze was owned by the Canterbury Steam Shipping Company. She was taken up on 3 March 1942, under protest, to replace the Puriri which had sunk in a minefield. She was a sister ship to Gale.

== Operational history ==
Breeze joined the 25th Minesweeping Flotilla at Tulagi in April 1943. On her arrival she was also formed, with Matai and her sister ship Gale, into the 9th Auxiliary Minesweeping group within the flotilla. They carried out night-time patrol and escort duties under COMSOPAC control. The Japanese were well north by this time, but occasionally made sudden attacks into American strongholds around Guadalcanal.

In July 1943, prior to being fitted with radar, Breeze collided with USS LST-895 off Guadalcanal while patrolling in a monsoon rainstorm. Grazing port to port, she had a boat wrecked.

During convoy escort duty in Ironbottom Sound she was attacked, but not damaged, by dive-bombers.

From time to time the flotilla boats would return to Auckland for refits, usually escorting freighters bound the same way.

By the middle of 1944 the owners were demanding the return of Breeze and her twin Gale. COMSOPAC released her on 10 November 1944.

== Fate ==
She was sold to the Philippines in 1964 and renamed Balabac in 1966.

== See also ==
- Minesweepers of the Royal New Zealand Navy
