= Emily Dorothea Pavy =

Australian teacher and lawyer (1885–1967)

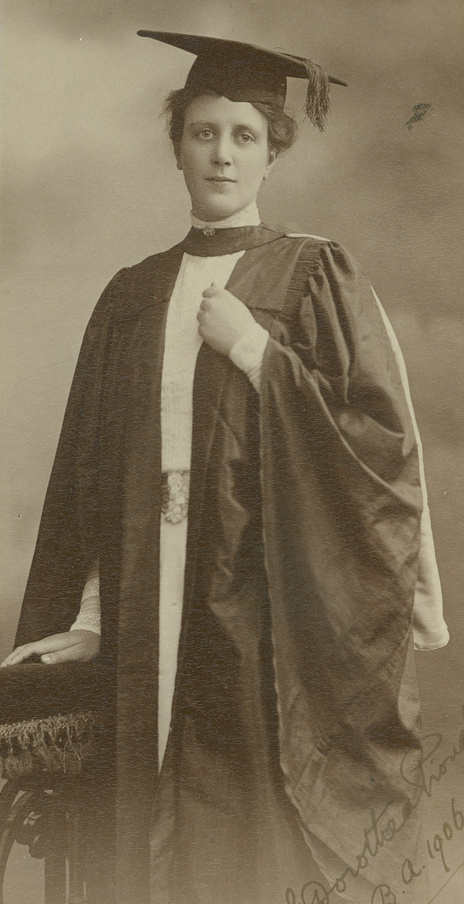
Pavy in 1906

Emily Dorothea Pavy CBE (19 June 1885 – 8 September 1967) was an Australian teacher, sociologist and lawyer. In 1912, she became the first Catherine Helen Spence scholarship recipient. While at London School of Economics, she researched the conditions of female factory workers and wrote a thesis named Welfare Work. She died in 1967.

== Early life ==
Pavy was born on 19 June 1885 in North Adelaide to Cornelius and Emily Proud. Her family was liberal, and her father advocated for women's rights, including their suffrage in South Australia. She completed her secondary education at the Advanced School for Girls and then graduated with a Bachelor of Arts from the University of Adelaide in 1906. In 1917, Prime Minister Lloyd George had appointed her a C.B.E. by King George V; she married Lieutenant Gordon Augustus Pavy in London on 10 November 1917.

== Career ==
In 1906, Pavy commenced working as a teacher at Kyre College for five years. By 1912, she won the first Catherine Helen Spence scholarship to promote the study of sociology by women in South Australia. Pavy studied the industrial conditions of female factory workers at the London School of Economics and wrote a thesis named Welfare Work which aimed to improve welfare policies and working conditions in British factories. She believed welfare measures could enhance individuality and living standards without reduced productivity, and advocated widely for women's issues through law, community service, and research. Pavy then studied law and was admitted as a lawyer in 1928, where she worked with her husband, also a lawyer, in general practice. She lectured in social science at the University of Adelaide and studied the children of divorcees. She retired in 1953.

== Personal life ==
Pavy and her husband had two children, a son and a daughter, both of whom became medical doctors. Her husband died in 1964. Pavy died on 8 September 1967.

== Publications ==
- Proud, E. Dorothea (1916). Welfare Work: Employers' Experiments for Improving Working Conditions in Factories. London: E. Bell and Sons Ltd – via Internet Archive.
