= Catherine Helen Spence Memorial Scholarship =

South Australian women's travelling scholarship

Catherine Helen Spence Memorial Scholarships are travelling scholarships founded by the South Australian Government in 1911 in recognition of the pioneering social worker and feminist Catherine Helen Spence.

The scholarships are administered by the Catherine Helen Spence Memorial Scholarship Committee, and granted to selected applicants, who must be female and between the ages of 20 and 46. Membership of the scholarship committee is voluntary and appointed by the Minister of Education and Child Development on recommendation by the committee.

== Recipients of the award ==
- 1912 Dorothea Proud (1885-1967), teacher, sociologist and lawyer. To research the conditions of female factory workers.
- 1921 Constance Davey (1882–1963), psychologist. To undertake a doctorate at the University of London; her main area of research was 'mental efficiency and deficiency' in children.
- 1925 Daisy Curtis, police officer. To examine the 'methods of protecting women and children'. This included travels to the jurisdictions of Great Britain, Norway, Sweden, Germany, Nederlands, the United States of America, and New Zealand. (New Zealand did not get its first female officer until 1941.)
- 1929 Gertrude 'Vera' Gaetjens, school teacher. Industrial psychology and women at work and leisure. Also awarded the Roby Fletcher Prize at the University of Adelaide in the same year.
- 1933 Agnes Dorsch (-1937), nurse and matron. Interest in studying maternal and child welfare.
- 1938 Doris Beeston (1897-1940), kindergarten teacher and early education reformer. To study parent education and child welfare.
- 1946 Mary Smith (1909–1989), psychologist. To study 'modern trends in child psychology and work with adolescents', travelling to the Victoria University of Manchester, England.
- 1953 Diana Lorking, social scientist. Special interest in juvenile delinquency.
- 1962 Marie Mune, social worker, researcher and educator. Researched the effects of communication and cooperation in social welfare and community development. Became the first Head of the School of Social Studies at the South Australian Institute of Technology in 1966.
- 1971 Fay Gale (1932–2008), cultural geographer. Enabled to be a visiting lecturer in the Geography School at Oxford University, England.
- 1976 Alwyn Dolling, social worker. Research of services for people with epilepsy. Study tour took her to Europe, Scandinavia, and the United Kingdom.
- 1983 Anne Killen
- 1989 Fran Baum, social scientist. Investigated healthy cities in Europe and Canada.
- 1993 Ronda Schultz
- 1997 Megan Warin, social researcher. To investigate the treatment of anorexia nervosa.
- 2001 Janette Young
- 2005 Melanie Dancer (Jones) South Australia Police (SAPOL) Reported the impact of changing legislation to include an offence of 'drink spiking' into SA legislation with a particular focus on policy reform and its real-world implications for communities.
- 2009 Sarah Paddick, architect. Considerations for women and children in the design of prisons.
- 2013 Joanne Kaeding, librarian. Reported on open access to public libraries for families with children with special needs.
- 2018 Dr. Prudence Flowers. Investigated the termination of pregnancy after 20 weeks' gestation in the West.
- 2022 Tessa Cunningham, social worker. Research into the experiences of young people in the criminal justice system.
