= Mary Smith (psychologist) =

Australian psychologist

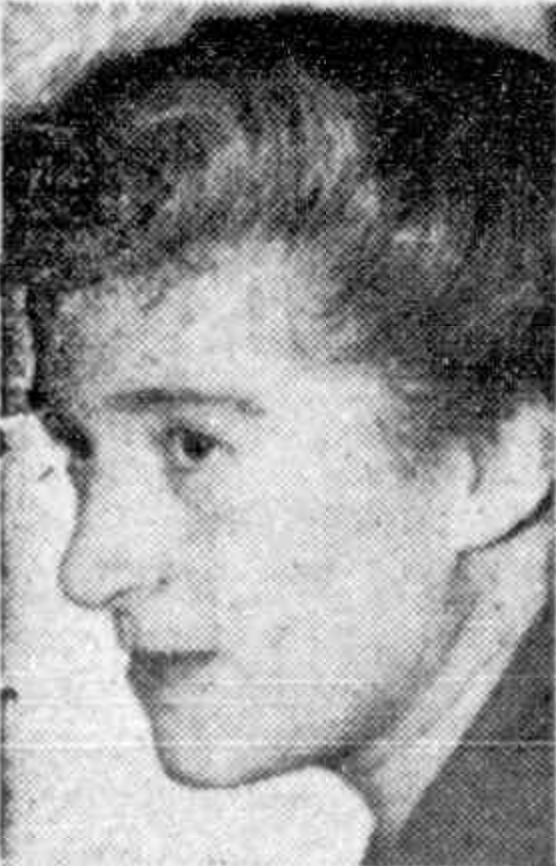
Mary Smith, psychologist, c.1954

Mary Smith (22 November 1909 – 25 November 1989) was an English-born Australian psychologist.

== Early life ==
She was probably born at Liverpool in England, the daughter of storeman David Smith and Wilhelmina Fletcher, née McLean. The family moved to South Australia in 1911, settling in the suburbs of Birkenhead and Largs Bay North. She was educated at state schools and graduated from Adelaide High School in 1927 before studying at the University of Adelaide (Bachelor of Arts, 1930; Master of Arts, 1932), becoming a schoolteacher.

== Career ==
As a teacher, she became interested in "problem children", working as an honorary probation, officer with the Children's Court. In 1938 she was given a free passage to England to begin doctoral research in psychology at the Victoria University of Manchester on "the mental readjustment of the problem child". World War II disrupted Smith's career and she returned to Adelaide in 1940.

On her return, Smith became assistant psychologist with the Department of Education, becoming departmental psychologist in 1942. She resigned in 1944 after campaigning vigorously and controversially for better salaries for female teachers. She established a private practice, becoming well known for her column 'You and Your Child' in the Sunday Mail (1944–1969).

She returned to the Victoria University of Manchester after winning the Catherine Helen Spence scholarship in 1945, studying "modern trends in child psychology and work with adolescents".

She was the first South Australian woman to stand for the Senate, as an ungrouped independent at the 1949 federal election, although she was unsuccessful.

Full-time child psychologist at the Adelaide Children's Hospital from 1953, Smith made progress with direct play therapy and was involved in the special education branch of the Department of Education. Considered a pioneering South Australian psychologist, she took a mentalistic approach which became outdated as behaviouralism came into vogue.

She was also active in the community as president of the Young Women's Christian Association of Adelaide from 1950 to 1951, and continued to write her newspaper column on the mental health and wellbeing of children until 1969. She died at North Adelaide in 1989.
