= Constance Davey =

Australian psychologist (1882–1963)

Constance Davey OBE
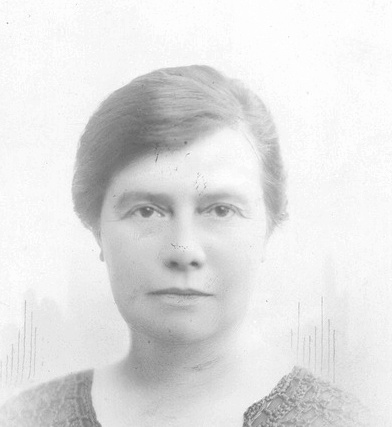
- Davey in 1924
- Born: Constance Muriel Davey; 4 December 1882; Nuriootpa, South Australia
- Died: 4 December 1963 (aged 81)
- Education: University of Adelaide
- Occupation: Psychologist

Constance Muriel Davey OBE (4 December 1882 – 4 December 1963) was an Australian psychologist who worked in the South Australian Department of Education, where she introduced the state's first special education classes.

== Biography ==
Davey was born in 1882 in Nuriootpa, South Australia, to Emily Mary (née Roberts) and Stephen Henry Davey. She began teaching at a Port Adelaide private school in 1908 and at St Peter's Collegiate Girls' School in 1909. She attended the University of Adelaide as a part-time student, completing a B.A. in philosophy in 1915 and an M.A. in 1918. In 1921 she won a Catherine Helen Spence Memorial Scholarship which allowed her to undertake a doctorate at the University of London; her main area of research was "mental efficiency and deficiency" in children. She received her doctorate in 1924 and visited the United States and Canada to observe the teaching of intellectually disabled and delinquent children before returning to Australia.

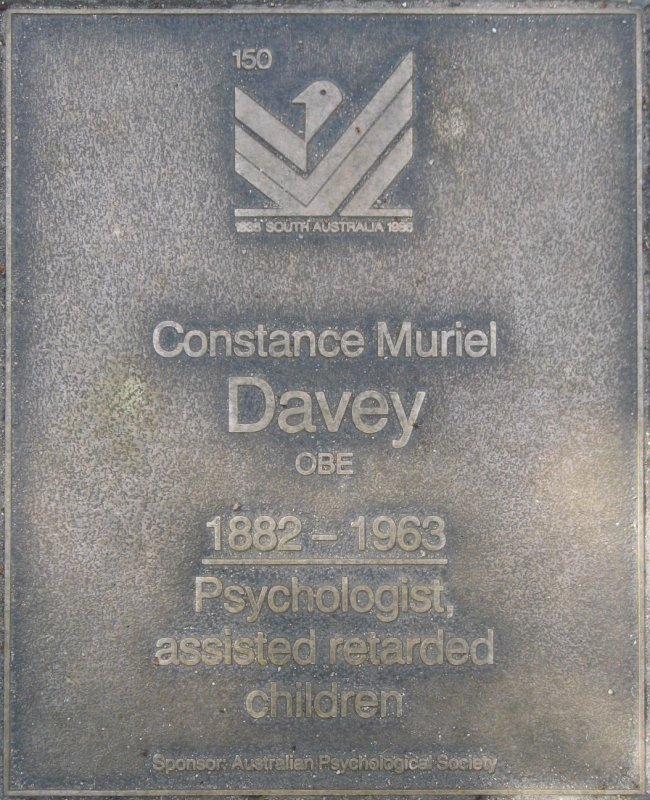
Constance Davey's plaque on the Jubilee 150 Walkway in Adelaide

In November 1924 Davey was hired as the first psychologist in the South Australian Department of Education, where she was tasked with examining and organising classes for "backward, retarded and problem" school students. She examined and performed intelligence tests on all educationally delayed children, and established South Australia's first "opportunity class" for these children in 1925. She set up a course which educated teachers on working with intellectually disabled children in 1931. She began lecturing in psychology at the University of Adelaide in 1927, continuing until 1950, and in 1938 she helped to set up a new university course for training social workers. She resigned from the Department of Education in 1942, by which point there were 700 children in the opportunity classes she had introduced.

Davey was a member of the Women's Non-Party Political Association for 30 years and served as the organisation's president from 1943 to 1947.

She became a fellow of the British Psychological Society in 1950 and was appointed an Officer of the Order of the British Empire (OBE) in 1955.

In June 1951, she led, along with Phyllis Duguid, a deputation from the League of Women Voters to the Playford Government, to allow women jurors in South Australia. Unsuccessful, she led another deputation in 1955 but received the same response. It wasn't until 1962 that South Australian women were granted the right to sit as jurors, when the deputation led by Roma Mitchell was finally successful.

In 1956, she published Children and Their Law-makers, a historical study of South Australian law as it pertained to children, which she had begun in 1945 as a senior research fellow at the University of Adelaide.

Davey died of thyroid cancer on her 81st birthday in 1963.
