= Fran Baum =

Australian social scientist

Fran Baum AO FASSA FAHMS
- Born: Frances Elaine Baum
- Known for: Public health
- Scientific career
- Institutions: Flinders University

Fran Baum is an Australian social scientist who conducts research on the social and economic influences and determinants of health. She is director of the Southgate Institute of Health, Society and Equity at Flinders University, Australia, and became an Officer of the Order of Australia for her advocacy work on "improved access to community health care, and to professional organisations". In 2006, Baum was elected a Fellow of the Academy of the Social Sciences in Australia.

== Career ==
Baum works on links between poor health and social inequality. Her research on health policy and budget issues has been described numerous times in The Conversation. Baum has also given talks on panels as well as for the media, on issues including fair taxation, and health as well as links between poverty and poor health.

Baum has spoken on a panels on de-industrialisation, plus the global social challenges which de-industrialisation brings. Her discussion focused around how, issues in various countries, such as communities struggling to adjust and adapt to de-industrialisation. "Now car manufacturing has ceased in South Australia, some have applied the 'rustbelt' epithet to the state. But the social and economic challenges it faces are part of a global phenomenon. How do you assist communities facing joblessness, the demise of old industries, as well as intergenerational disadvantage?". The symposium was recorded for an NHMRC Centre for Research Excellence for the Health Equity symposium, in Adelaide 2017.

Baum's research crosses both social and economic inequities and focuses on the resultant impacts on people's and community health. Baum also specialises in evaluating the promotion of health, including indigenous health, and healthy cities initiatives. Baum was awarded an Australian Research Council Federation Fellowship on developing effective responses from social and government perspectives, to health inequity and social exclusion. Baum has been awarded national grants investigating aspects of health inequity, also has a long-term teaching career, which has focused on public health. Baum has written a book, The New Public Health, which in 2015 was in its 4th edition.

Baum became an Officer of the Order of Australia (AO) in the 2016 Queen's Birthday Honours. Her award was for being "an advocate for improved access to community health care, and to professional organisations".

== Selected publications ==
- Baum, F.E., Graycar, A. and Delany-Crowe, T.N. (2016). Understanding Australian Policies on Public Health. Canberra: The Academy of Social Sciences in Australia.
- Baum, F.E., Newman, L.A., Biedrzycki, K.R. and Patterson, J. (2010). Can a regional government's social inclusion initiative contribute to the quest for health equity? Health Promotion International.
- Newman, L.A., Biedrzycki, K.R. and Baum, F.E. (2010). Digital technology access and use among socially and economically disadvantaged groups in South Australia. Journal of Community Informatics, 6(2).

=== Books ===
- Baum, Frances (2016). The new public health (4th ed.). Oxford University Press. ISBN 978-0-19-559629-8.
- Baum, Frances (2019). Governing for Health: Advancing health and equity through policy and advocacy. Oxford University Press. ISBN 978-0-19-025897-9.

== Awards, honours and recognition ==
- 2017 – Fellow of the Australian Academy of Health and Medical Sciences (FAHMS)
- 2016 – Officer of the Order of Australia (AO)
- 2008 – Australian Research Council Federation Fellow
- 2007 – Fellow, Australian Health Promotion Association
- 2006 – Fellow, Academy of the Social Sciences in Australia
- 1999–2000 Life Member and past National President, Public Health Association of Australia
- 1989 – Catherine Helen Spence Memorial Scholarship
