= US Naval Base Marianas =

Base World War II bases in the Mariana Islands

- Location of the Northern Mariana Islands (circled in red)
- Time zone: UTC+10:00 (ChST)

Map of Mariana Islands in Micronesia (shown in dark magenta)

US Naval Base Marianas was a number of United States Navy bases in the Mariana Islands in the Pacific Ocean's Micronesia. Most were built by the US Navy Seabees, Naval Construction Battalions, during World War II. Naval Base Guam was lost to the Empire of Japan during the Battle of Guam in December 1941. Guam was retaken by United States Armed Forces on July 21, 1944, now also known as Liberation Day. Naval Station Guam was founded on August 7, 1899, after Spain lost the Spanish–American War.

== History ==
On December 10, 1898, Guam was ceded to the United States and the complete island of Guam became a Naval Station. Naval Advance Base Saipan was built after the Battle of Saipan ended on July 9, 1944. Naval Base Tinian construction started began on August 1, 1944, at the end of the Battle of Tinian. The Marianas Islands Fleet Post Office (FPO) was 3062. Naval Base Tinian had special secret facilities built for the handling of the atomic bombs Little Boy and Fat Man. The bombs were loaded on to the Boeing B-29 Superfortress Enola Gay and Bockscar. The US Naval built bases for troops, ships, submarines, PT boats, seaplanes, supply depots, training camps, fleet recreation facilities, and ship repair depots. To keep supplies following the bases were supplied by the vast II United States Merchant Navy. After the war ended on VJ Day, all but bases were closed, less Guam, which continued at an US Naval Advance Base.

== Major Bases ==
Major US Naval Bases in the Mariana Islands:

- Naval Base Guam, Southern Mariana Island, FPO 926, still active
- Naval Base Saipan, Northern Mariana Islands, FPO 3245 (1944 to 1962)
- Naval Base Tinian, Northern Mariana Islands, FPO 3247 (1944–1947)

== Minor Bases ==
Minor World War II US Naval Bases in the Mariana Islands:

- Naval Base on Marcus Island, Just North of the Northern Mariana Island, FPO# 3084, airstrip and LORAN station. (1945–1993)
- Naval Base on Pagan Island, Northern Mariana Island, FPO 3083 (1944–1962)
- Naval Base on Anatahan Island, Northern Mariana Island, FPO 3041, site of Japanese holdouts
- Naval Base on Sarigan Island, Northern Mariana Island, FPO 3046, now nature preserve
- Naval Base on Guguan Island, Northern Mariana Island, FPO 3047
- Naval Base on Maug Island, Northern Mariana Island, FPO 3077
- Naval Base on Rota Island, Northern Mariana Island, FPO 3261
- Naval Base on Farallon de Medinilla, Northern Mariana Island, FPO 3036, uninhabited small island
- Base on Guam: Orote, on the Orote Peninsula, FPO 939
- Base on Guam: Agana, FPO 943

== Naval Airfields ==
- Kagman Field, FPO 958
- Marpi Point Field, FPO 959
- Kobler Field, FPO 957

== Gallery ==
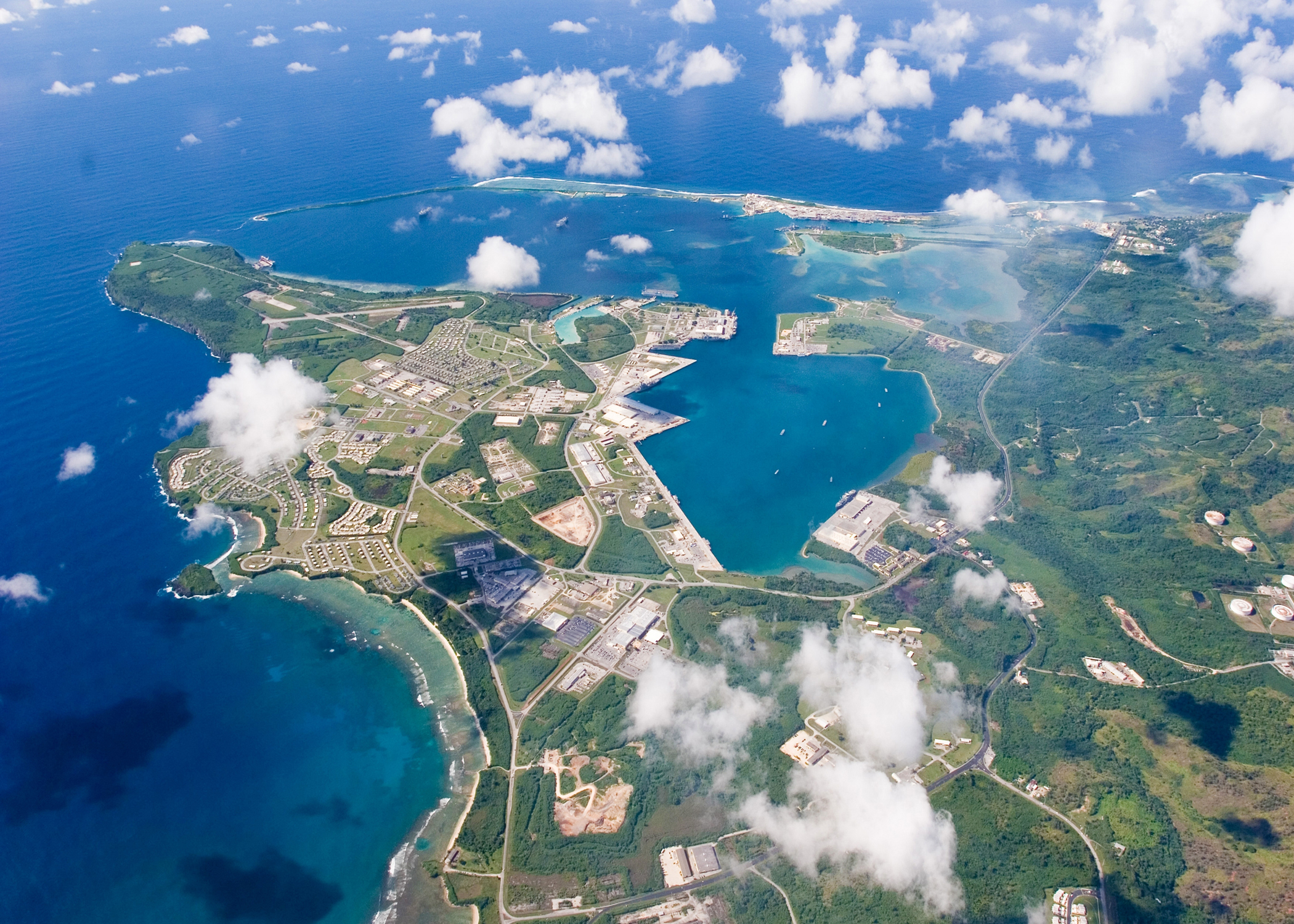
Naval Base Guam in 2006

Map of the Battle of Tinian from 1944

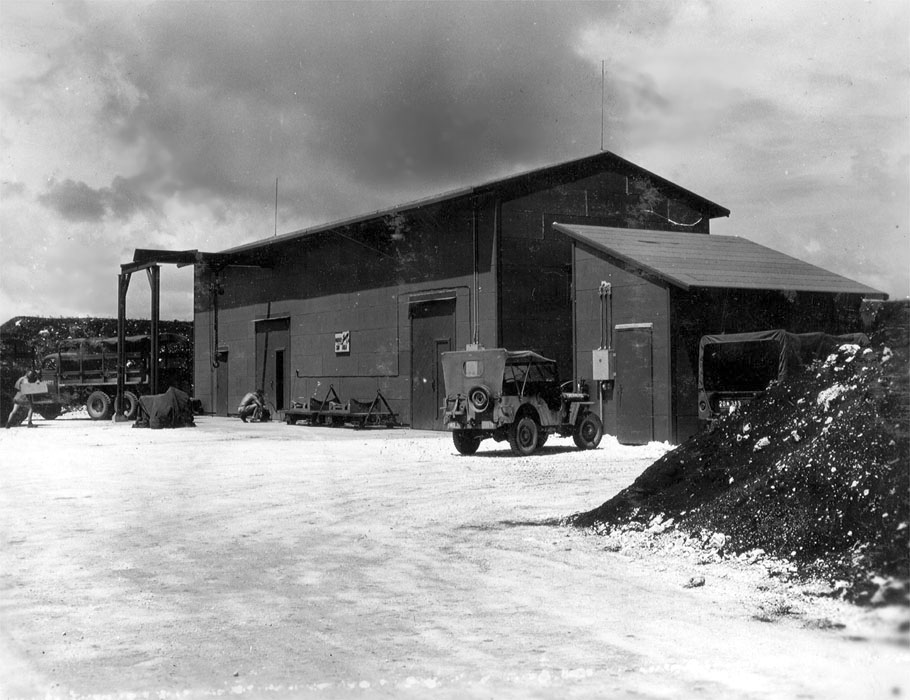
Assembly Building where A-bombs were assembled on Tinian

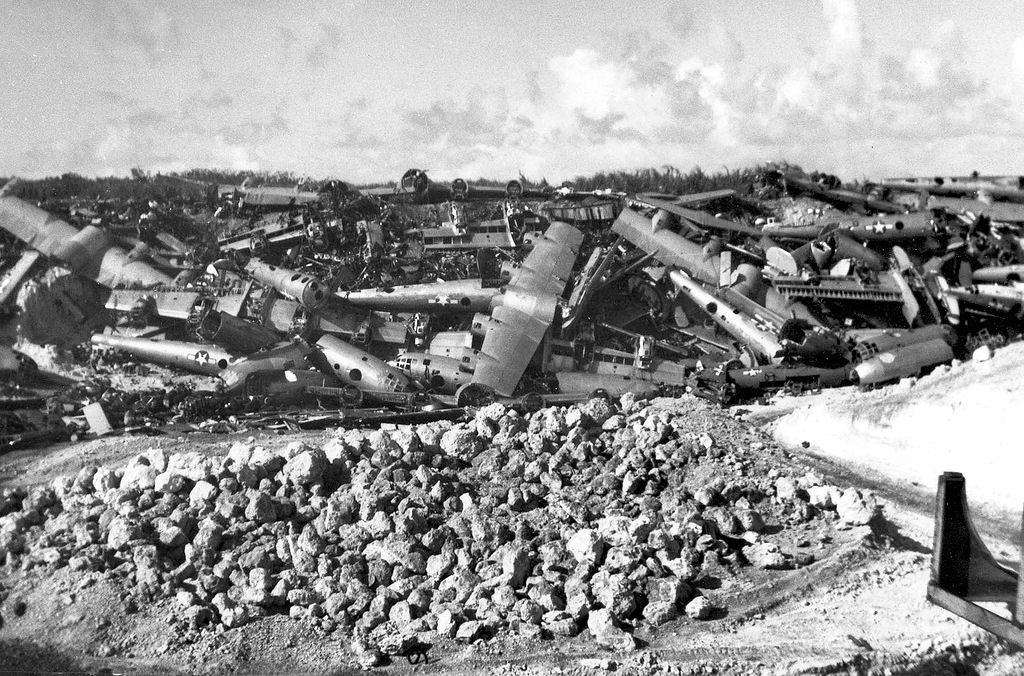
B-29 Superfortress graveyard, North Field, Tinian, 1946. During the war, bulldozers were always waiting at the ends of the runways. Any problem with takeoff or landing and the B-29's were bulldozed off the runway to keep the flow moving.

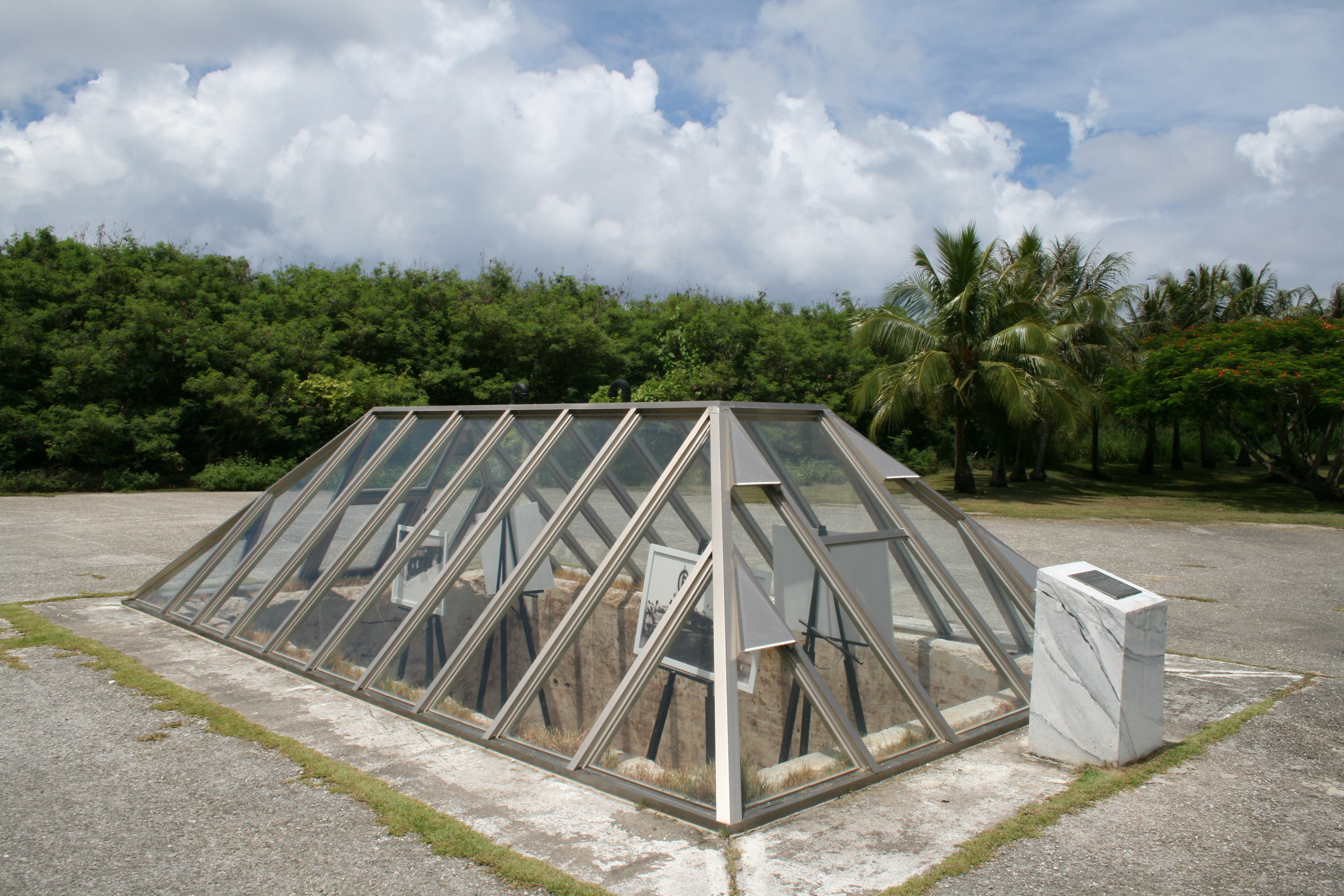
No. 1 Bomb Loading Pit Historical marker at North Field

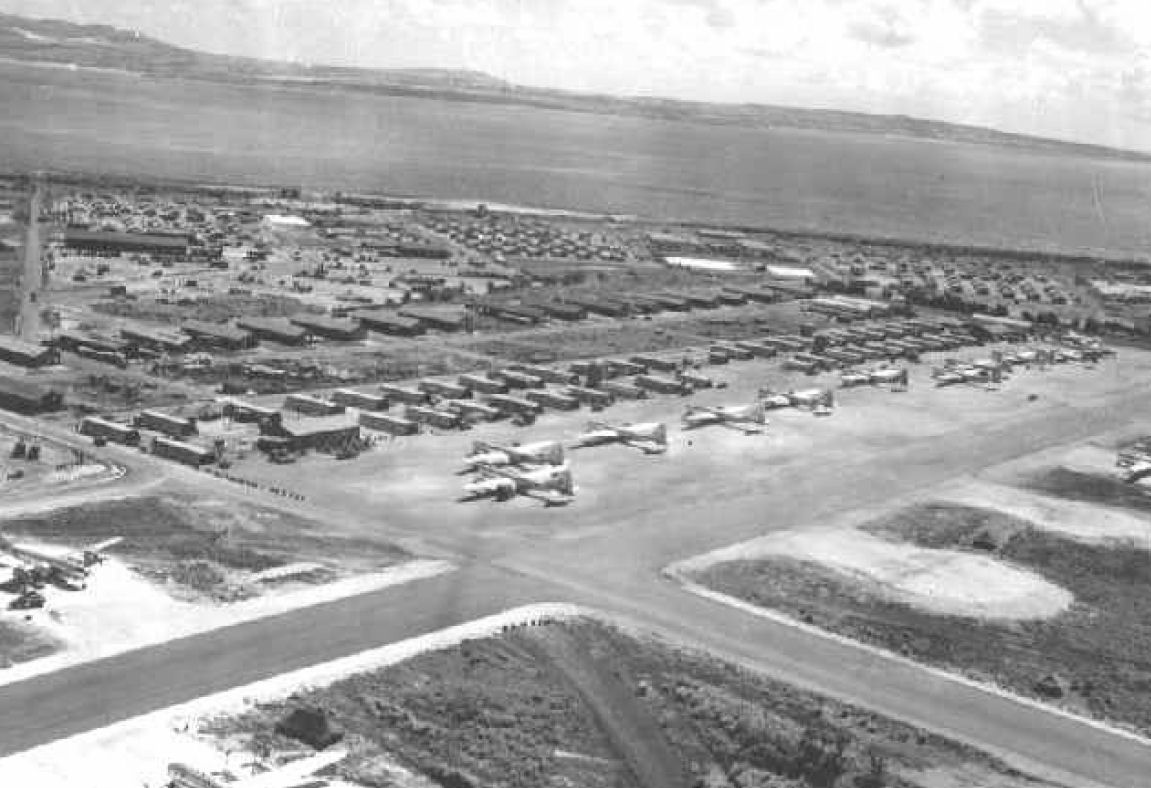
B-29s on West Field parking ramp

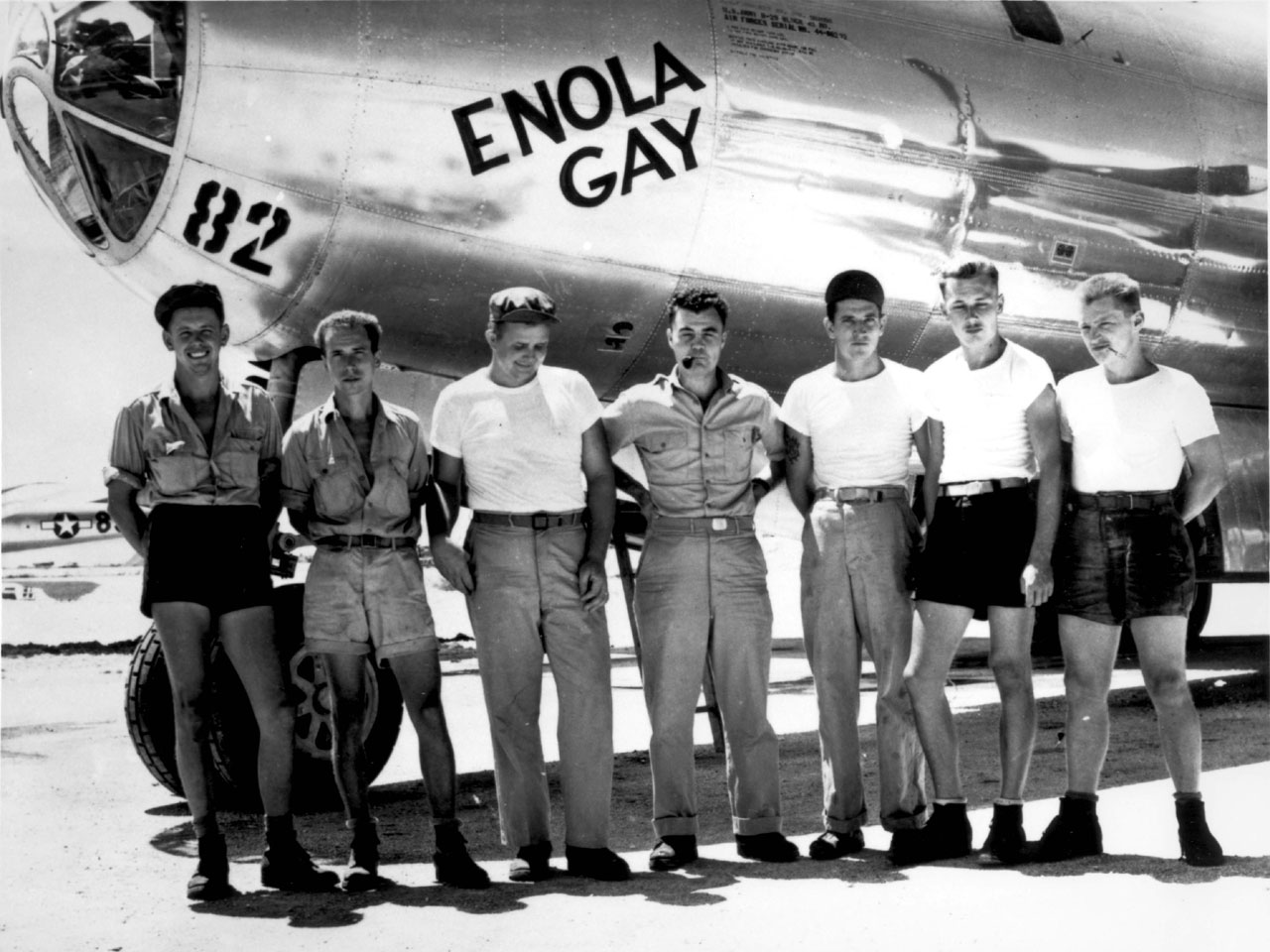
Enola Gay, pilot Paul Tibbets and members of the ground crew

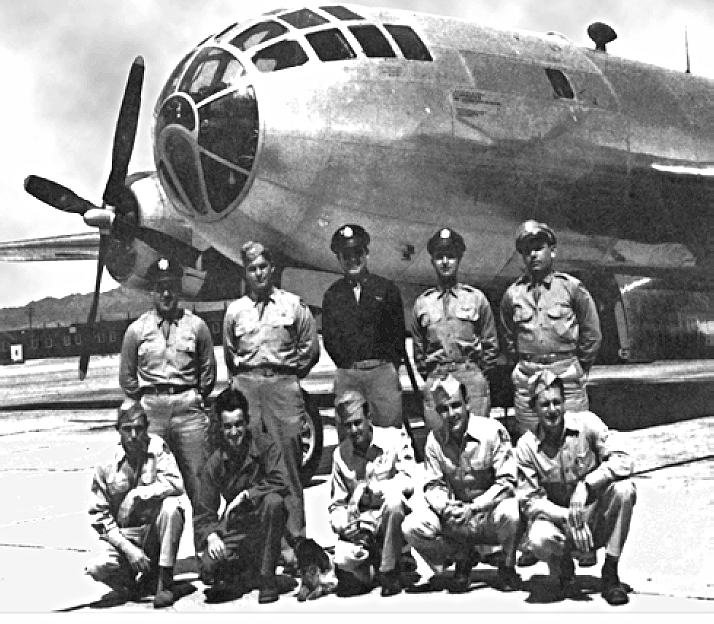
Flight crew of the Bockscar

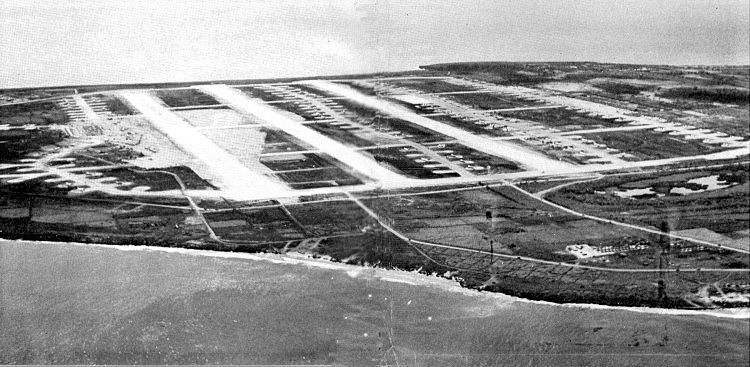
North Field on Tinian

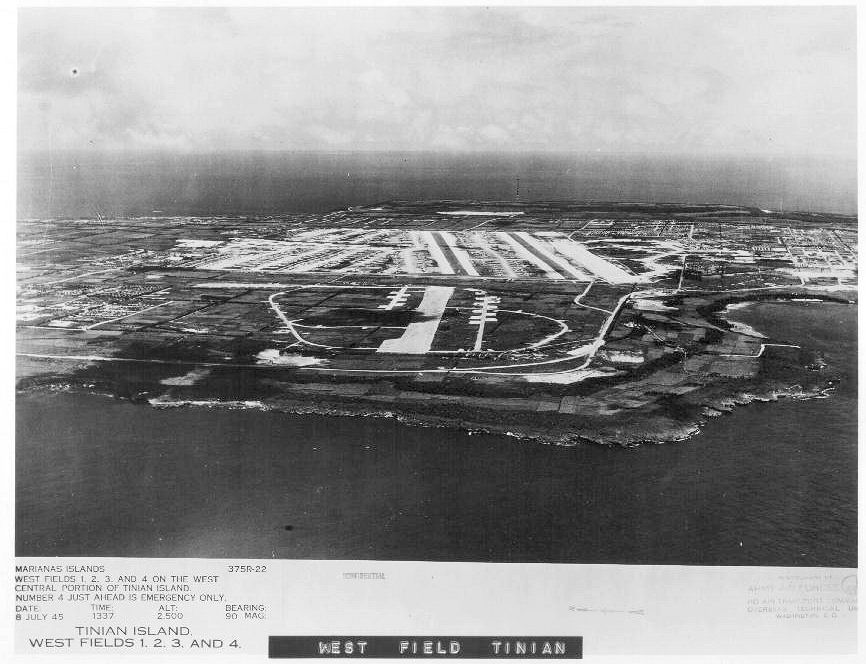
West Field on Tinian

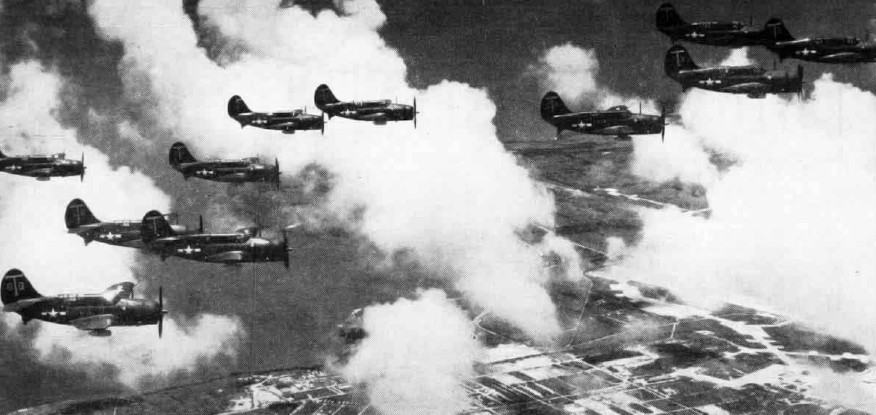
US Navy VFA-14's Curtiss SB2C Helldiver over Tinian in 1947, before base closure

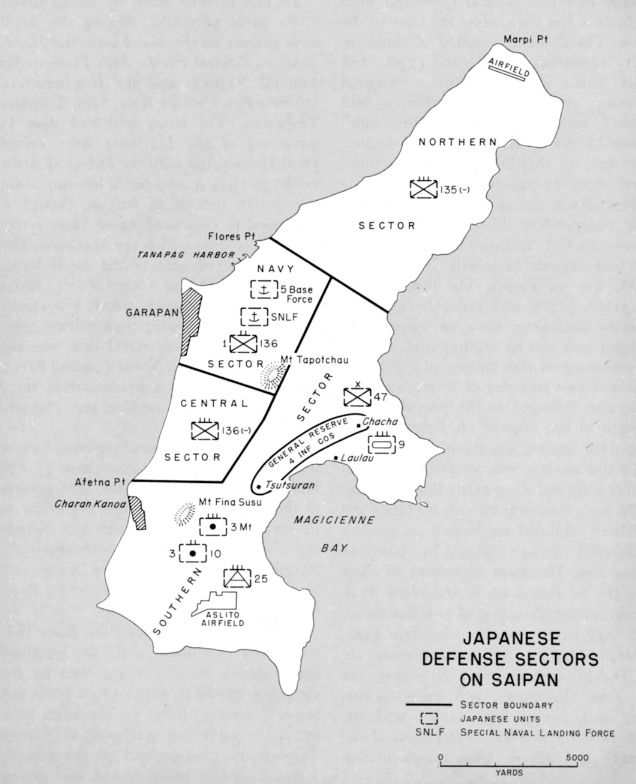
Saipan map from 1944

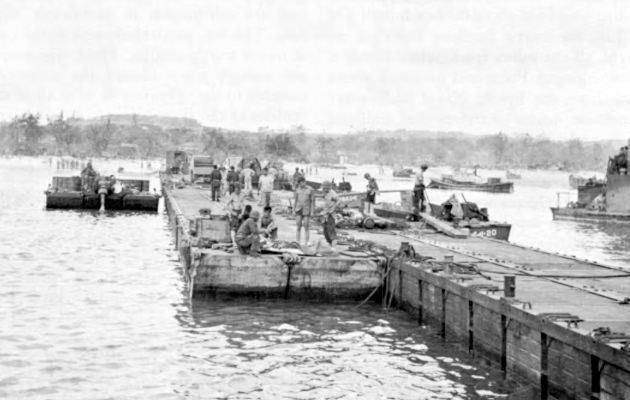
US Navy Charan Kanoa port in Saipan in 1944

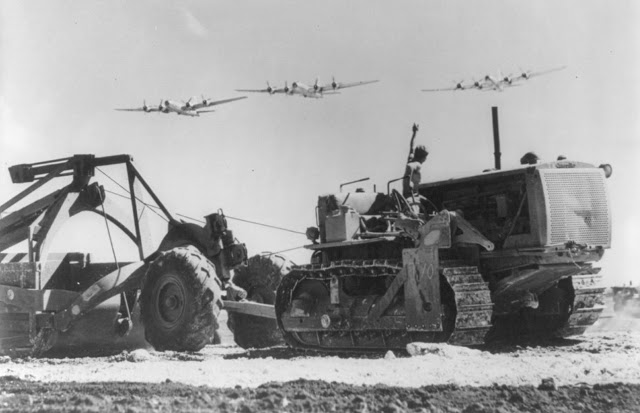
Seabees completing runway on Saipan in 1945 with B 29 in the air

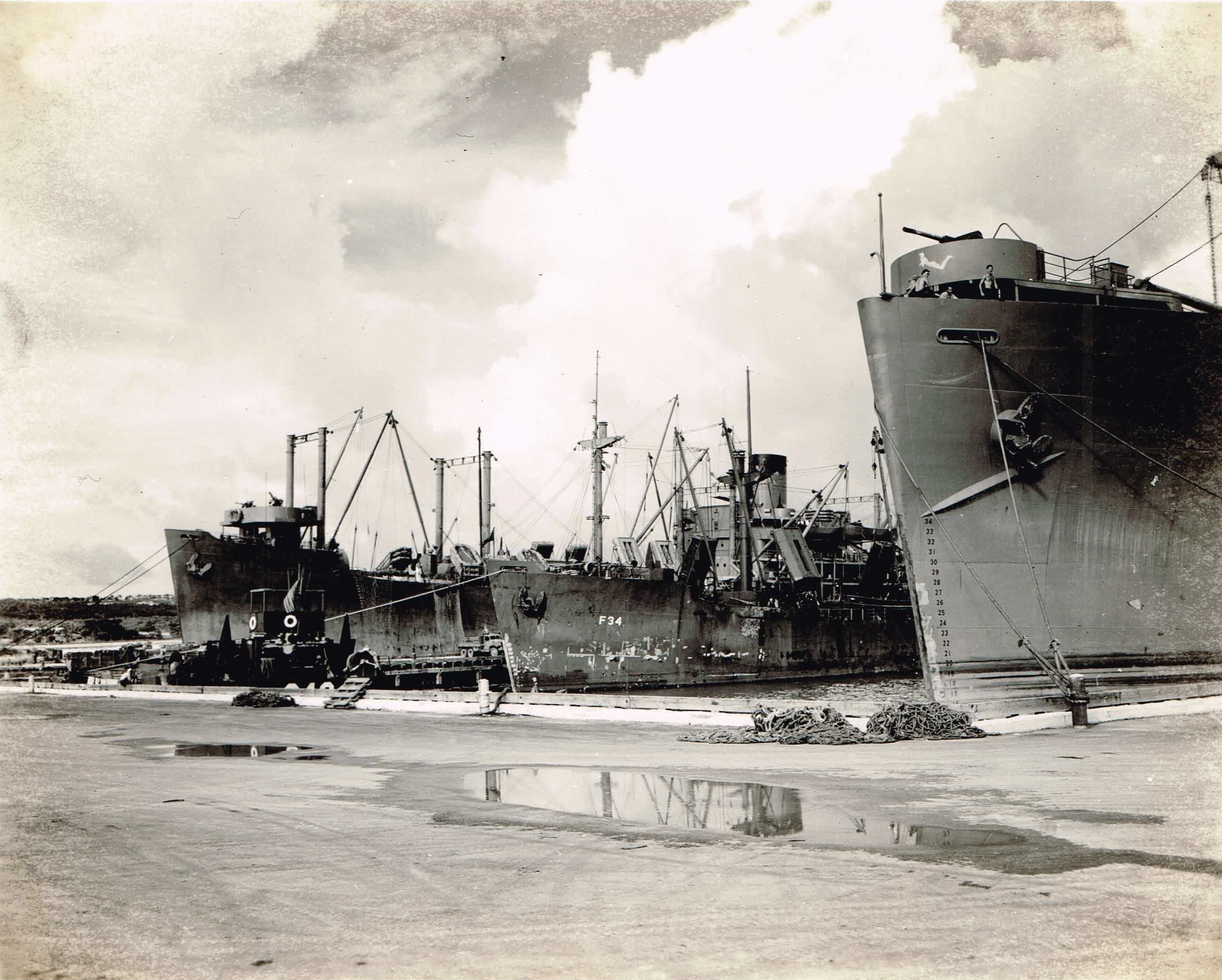
Navy ships docked at Saipan

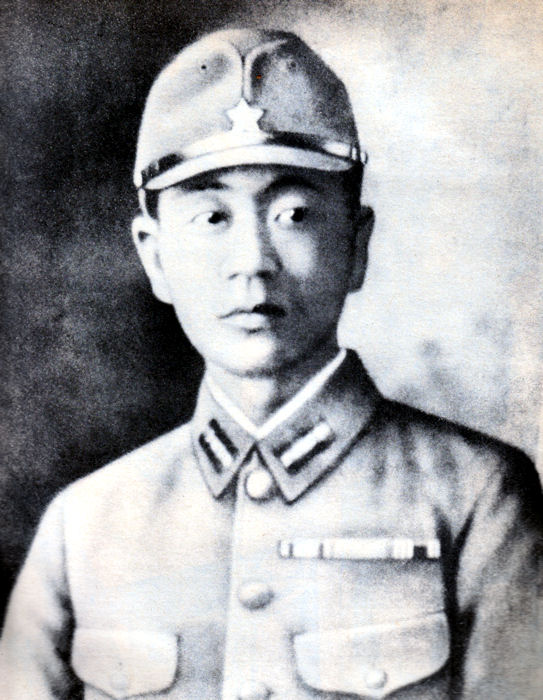
Japanese holdout Sergeant Shoichi Yokoi was discovered in Guam on 24 January 1972, almost 28 years after the Allies had regained control of the island in 1944.

South Pacific islands in 1945

== See also ==
- Seabees in World War II
- Battle of the Eastern Solomons
- US Naval Advance Bases
- Naval Base Marshall Islands
- US Naval Base New Guinea
- US Naval Base Australia
- US Naval Base Solomons
- US Naval Base New Zealand
