= Maug Islands =

Group of three small uninhabited islands

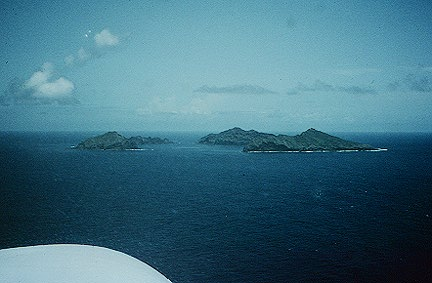
- United States Geological Survey photo of the Maug Islands.

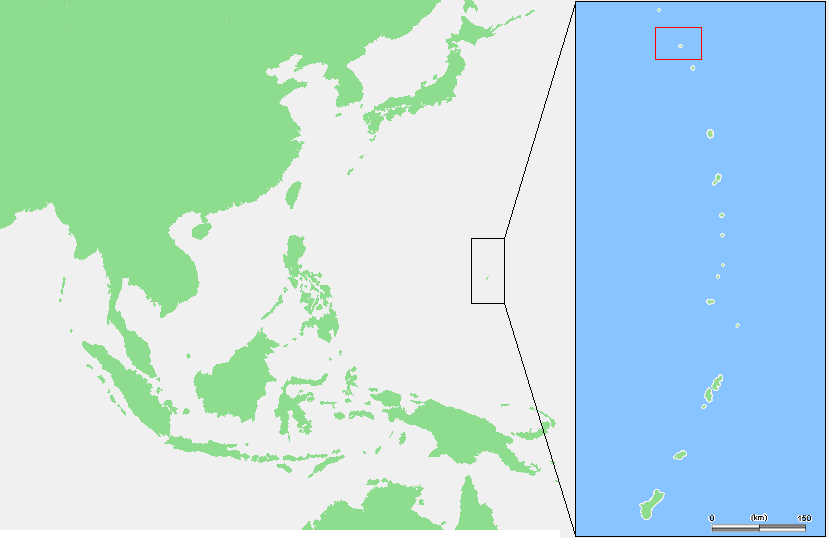

Geography
- Location: Pacific Ocean
- Coordinates: 20°2′N 145°13′E
- Archipelago: Northern Mariana Islands
- Area: 2.14 km^{2} (0.83 sq mi)
- Highest elevation: 227 m (745 ft)
- Highest point: North Island

Administration
- United States
- Commonwealth: Northern Mariana Islands

Demographics
- Population: 0 (2020)

Maug (from the Chamorro name for the islands, Ma'ok, meaning 'steadfast' or 'everlasting') consists of a group of three small uninhabited islands. This island group is part of the Northern Islands Municipality of the Commonwealth of the Northern Mariana Islands, itself part of the Marianas archipelago in the Oceanian sub-region of Micronesia.

== Geography ==
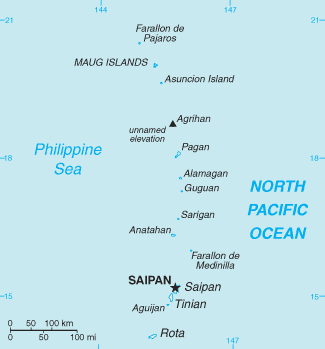
Northern Mariana Islands

The Maug Islands lie about 70 kilometers (43 mi; 38 nmi) south of Farallon de Pajaros and 37 km (23 mi; 20 nmi) north of Asuncion. The archipelago consists of three islands, the eroded exposed outer rim of a submerged volcano with a caldera with a diameter of approximately 2.2 km (1.4 mi; 1.2 nmi). The floor of the caldera is around 225 meters (738 ft) below sea level, and in the middle is a mountain whose summit is only 22 m (72 ft) below sea level. The total area of the islands combined is 2.13 square kilometers (0.82 sq mi), and the highest point is 227 m (745 ft) above sea level. About 10 km (6.2 mi) northwest of the Maug Islands is Supply Reef, a submarine volcano whose summit is 8 m (26 ft) below sea level. The Maug Islands and the Supply Reef are part of the same volcanic massif, and are connected by a saddle about 1,800 feet (550 m) below sea level.

Island	Length (km)	Width (km)	Area (km²)	Height (m)
North Island	1.5	0.5	0.47	227
East Island	2.25	0.5	0.95	215
West Island	2.0	0.75	0.71	178
Maug Islands	3.1	3.0	2.13	227

== Environment ==
The islands are overgrown with savannah grass. On East Island are Pandanus trees and coconut palms (Cocos nucifera), near the former settlement.

=== Important Bird Area ===
The islands have been recognised as an Important Bird Area (IBA) by BirdLife International because they support populations of Micronesian megapodes, red-tailed tropicbirds, brown noddies, Micronesian myzomelas and Micronesian starlings.

== History ==
From a European perspective, the Maug Islands were discovered in 1522 by Gonzalo Gómez de Espinosa, who named it Las Monjas ("The Nuns" in Spanish). Gómez de Espinosa was a member of Ferdinand Magellan's attempted circumnavigation of the globe (1519–1522), and after Magellan’s death unsuccessfully attempted to navigate the ship Trinidad across the Pacific Ocean to the Viceroyalty of New Spain (now Mexico). Gomez de Espinosa found the largest island of the Maug Islands settled by Chamorros, who called the island Mao or Pamo. Gómez de Espinosa freed Chamorros whom he had kidnapped on Agrihan and three of his crewmen deserted the Trinidad on the island. The Chamorros killed two of the deserters, but the third, castaway Gonzalo Alvarez de Vigo, later came to Guam.

Spain governed the Maug Islands as part of the Spanish East Indies beginning in the 16th century. In 1669, the Spanish missionary Diego Luis de San Vitores visited the Maug Islands and named them San Lorenzo (St. Lawrence). In 1695, the Spaniards forcibly deported all of the inhabitants of the islands to Saipan, and since that time the islands have been uninhabited. (In 1698, the Spaniards moved the former Maug Island inhabitants from Saipan to Guam.)

In 1899, Spain sold the Maug Islands along with the rest of the Mariana Islands (except Guam, which the United States had seized from Spain in 1898) to the German Empire under the terms of the German–Spanish Treaty. The formalities of cession took place on November 17, 1899, on Saipan. Germany administered the islands as part of German New Guinea. In 1903, the Germans leased the Maug Islands to a Japanese company which hunted birds for feathers for export to Japan and from there to Paris.

During World War I (1914–1918), the Empire of Japan seized the Maug Islands in 1914 and subsequently administered them as part of the South Seas Mandate. The Japanese established a weather station and a fish processing plant on the islands. During World War II, the German auxiliary cruiser Orion rendezvoused with supply ships in the waters over the caldera of the Maug Islands in January–February 1941 .

During the Pacific campaign (1941–1945) of World War II, the United States captured the Maug Islands, which became part of the vast US Naval Base Marianas. After the war ended in 1945, the islands came under the control of the United Nations and was administered on its behalf by the United States as part of the Trust Territory of the Pacific Islands. In 1978, the islands became part of the Northern Islands Municipality of the Commonwealth of the Northern Mariana Islands, which in turn became an unincorporated territory and commonwealth of the United States in 1986.

In 1985, per the Constitution of the Commonwealth of the Northern Mariana Islands, the islands were designated as a wilderness area for the protection and conservation of natural resources. Since 2009, the submerged lands and waters around the Maug Islands have been part of the Marianas Trench Marine National Monument of the United States.

== Gallery ==
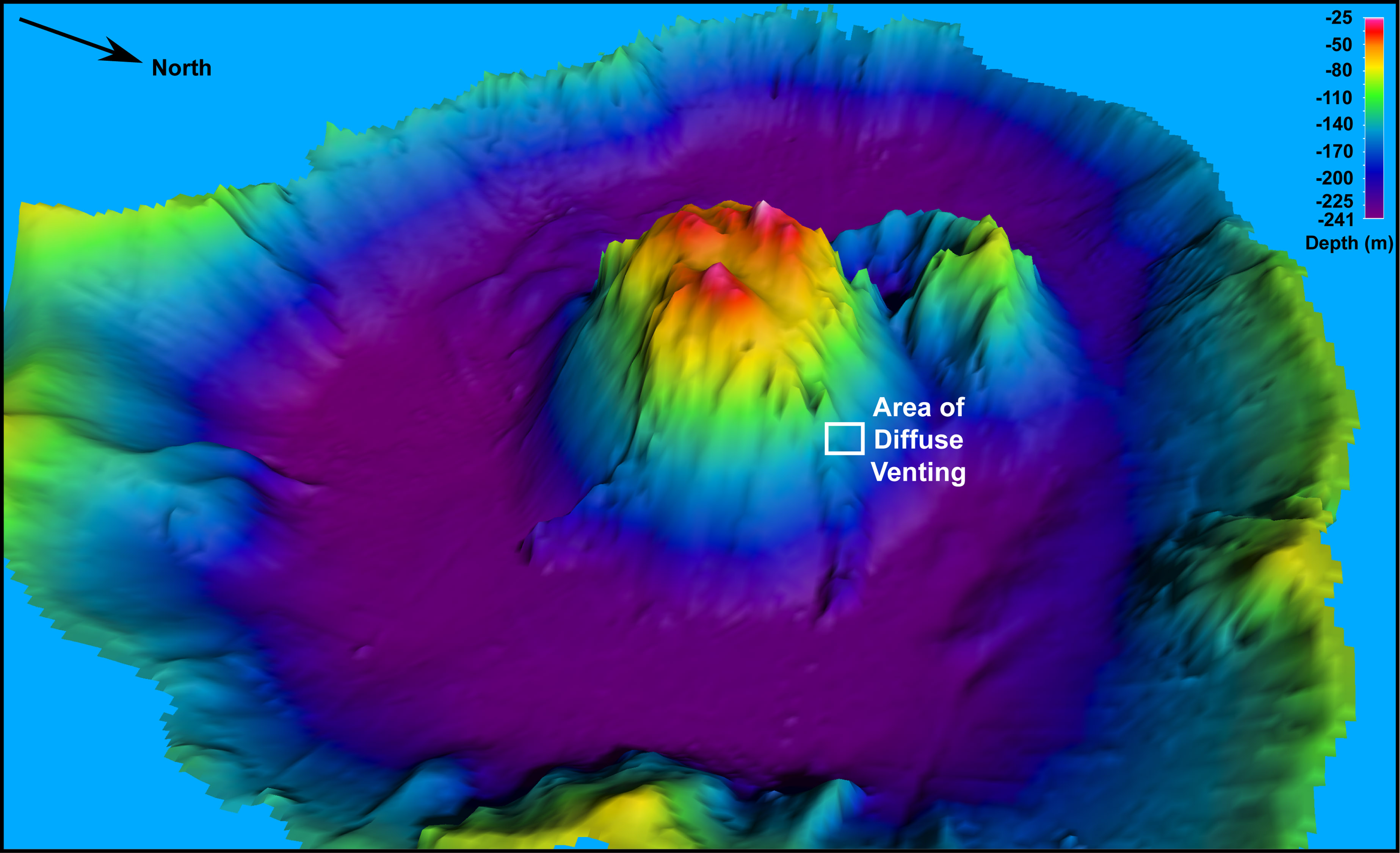
Perspective view of central cone within caldera. Colors indicate depth.

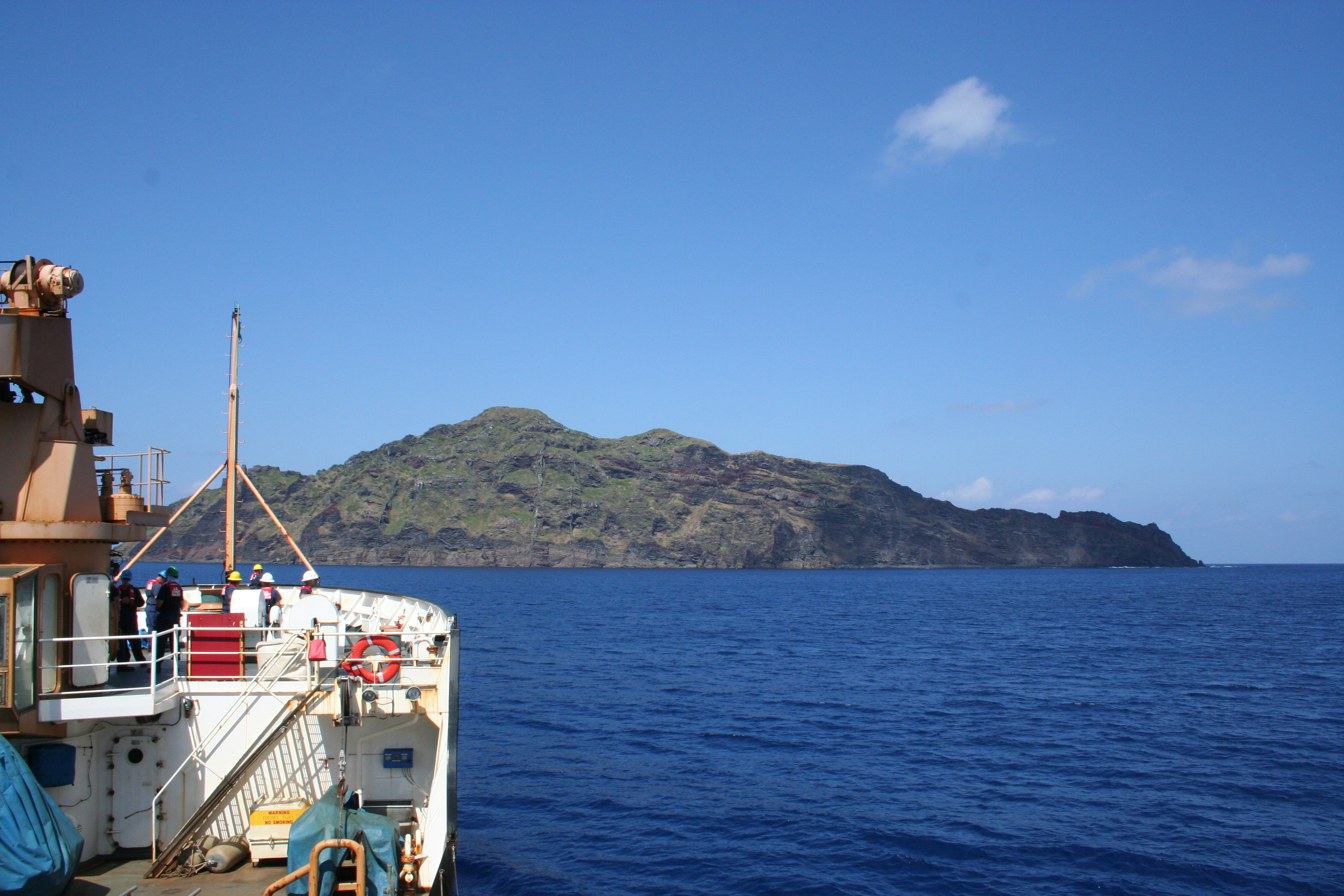
Maug's East Island taken from USCGC Sequoia.

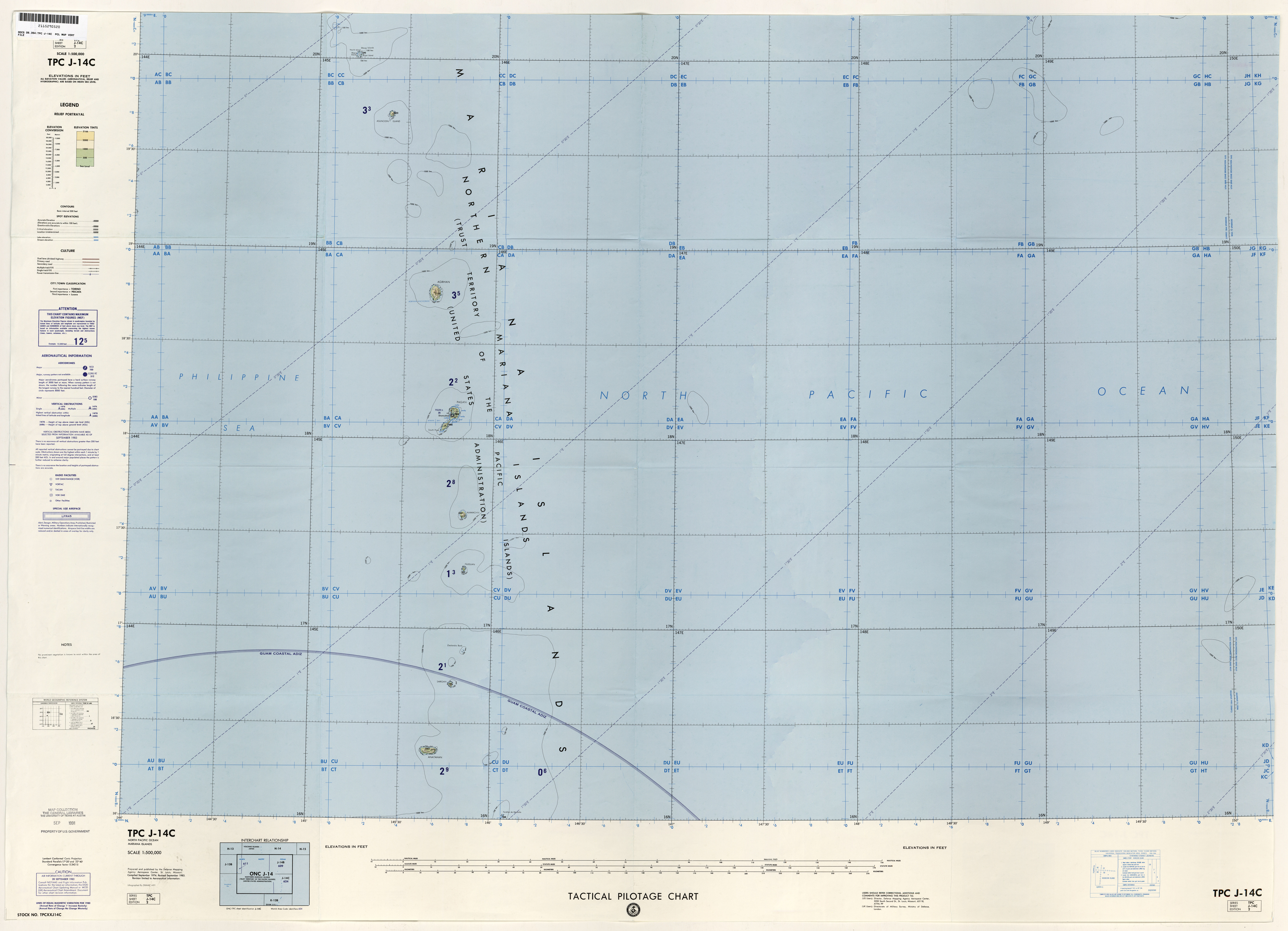
Map including the Maug Islands (DMA, 1983)

== See also ==
- List of stratovolcanoes
