= RMS Rangitane =

Passenger liner, launched in 1929

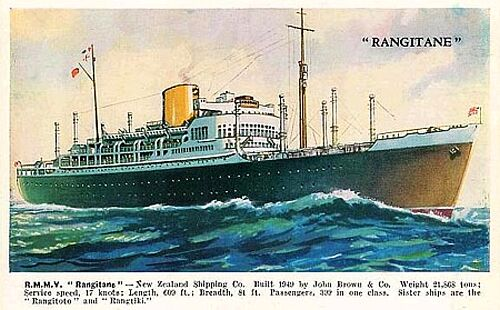

History

United Kingdom
- Name: Rangitane
- Owner: New Zealand Shipping Company
- Port of registry: Plymouth
- Route: Britain – New Zealand
- Builder: John Brown & Company, Glasgow
- Yard number: 522
- Launched: 27 May 1929
- Completed: 12 November 1929
- Fate: Sunk 27 November 1940 by German raiders

General characteristics
- Tonnage: 16,712 GRT, 10,289 NRT
- Length: 531.0 ft (161.8 m)
- Beam: 70.2 ft (21.4 m)
- Depth: 38.1 ft (11.6 m)
- Installed power: 9,300 hp (6,900 kW), 2,186 NHP
- Propulsion: Brown-Sulzer engines driving twin screws
- Capacity: 590 passengers in 1st, 2nd and 3rd classes (100, 80 & 410, respectively); "substantial" cargo
- Crew: 200
- Armament: 4.7 inch gun, 76.2mm machine gun, light AA guns

MS Rangitane was a passenger liner owned by the New Zealand Shipping Company. She was one of three sister ships (the other sisters were Rangitata and Rangitiki) delivered to the company in 1929 for the All-Red Route between Britain and New Zealand. Rangitane was built by John Brown & Company and launched on 27 May 1929.

The three ships each measured about 16,700 gross register tons, 530 feet (160 m) registered length and 70 feet (21 m) beam. They could carry nearly 600 passengers in 1st, 2nd and 3rd classes, 200 crew members, and substantial cargo. They had Brown-Sulzer diesel engines with a total output of 9,300 hp (6,900 kW), turning twin propellers. In wartime, they carried only defensive armament. On her final voyage Rangitane was armed with a 4.7-inch gun and 40 rounds of ammunition.

== Sinking ==
On her final voyage, which had been delayed by labour disputes, she carried 14,000 tons of cargo, including foodstuffs and silver bullion, valued at over £2,000,000 (equivalent to £97,000,000 in 2025). She carried 111 passengers, including CORB nurses, Polish sailors, servicemen and Radar technicians. The captain was Lionel Upton, a naval reservist who had been awarded the Distinguished Service Cross for his "services in action with enemy submarines" in his command of auxiliary boats based at Scapa Flow in World War I.

Rangitane left Auckland harbour in the early afternoon of Sunday 24 November 1940, en route to Britain via the Panama Canal. She was intercepted early on the morning of 27 November 300 miles east of New Zealand by the German surface raiders Komet and Orion and their support ship Kulmerland. Another ship, SS Holmwood, had been stopped and sunk by the German raiders on 24 November, but warning of the danger had not been passed on to Rangitane. This was later held to have been a factor in her sinking.

The Germans signalled Rangitane to stop and not to transmit anything. Following standard Admiralty instructions, however, Captain Upton ordered "QQQ" ('suspicious vessel') to be broadcast, which prompted signals jamming and shelling by the Germans. The main transmitter was quickly disabled and the emergency set was used to send "RRR" ('raider attack'), which was received and relayed. There followed a brief period of confusion. One German raider, suffering steering problems, sailed directly at Rangitane, which in turn, with steering damaged by the shelling, also steered directly at a German ship before circling. The helmsman reported loss of steering.

The interception had been made in the dark and the German ships were unsure of what they had found, believing that it was probably a cruiser-sized warship. Their attack was made on the basis it was the tactic most likely to allow their own escape.

Once he knew that the distress signals had been received in New Zealand, Upton ordered the ship's surrender. The shelling had caused widespread fires and some casualties, and, with her steering damaged, Rangitane's escape would be unlikely. Once hove to, sensitive documents such as code books were destroyed, and the crew instructed to destroy key engine components, to prevent Rangitane being taken as a prize. Despite the surrender, shelling continued and the furious Upton ordered full speed and return fire from the ship's guns, but this was prevented by destruction of telephones. The German shelling ceased and Upton gave the order to abandon ship.

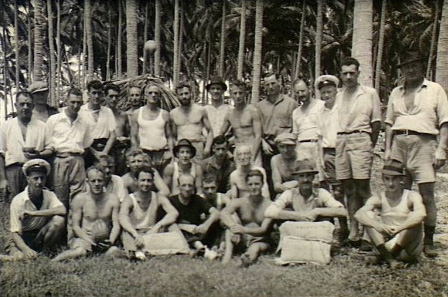
Released prisoners on Emirau

Sixteen people, eight passengers and eight crew, died as a result of the action, including those who died later of their injuries. Doris Anne Beeston who was a notable kindergarten teacher was killed. Elizabeth Plumb, a 59-year-old stewardess, ship's cook William Francis and deck mechanic John Walker were awarded British Empire Medals for their selflessness in rescuing and caring for survivors. Prize crews took control of Rangitane at dawn and supervised an orderly and rapid evacuation. The survivors, 296 passengers and crew, were taken across to the German ships by lifeboats or German boats and sent below.

Rangitane's broadcast warnings required that the Germans clear the area quickly, before allied aircraft arrived. Although she was clearly afire and sinking, Komet fired a single torpedo and Rangitane listed quickly to port and sank at 6:30 am. The Short Empire class flying boat Aotearoa, civil registration ZK-AMA, was the first Allied aircraft on the scene at about 2:30 pm, but found only an oil slick and debris. A subsequent air search missed the raiders, although they themselves saw one of the search aircraft.

German treatment of their prisoners was humane and as good as could be expected in the crowded conditions, and those who died were given proper funerals. The number of prisoners aboard the German ships caused concern to the German commanders and they decided to release most of them. After an intended release at Nauru had been thwarted by poor weather, and further actions had led to the capture of more prisoners, the survivors were released on the tiny island of Emirau, off New Guinea. The remainder, mostly of military age, were transported back to German-occupied Bordeaux and eventually to prisoner-of-war camps in Germany.

Rangitane was one of the largest passenger liners to be sunk in World War II.
