= German auxiliary cruiser Orion =

German commerce raider

Coordinates: 53°57′N 14°17′E

History

Germany
- Name: Kurmark
- Namesake: Kurmark
- Owner: HAPAG
- Operator: HAPAG
- Laid down: 1930 by Blohm & Voss, Hamburg
- Launched: 1930
- Commissioned: 1930
- Fate: Requisitioned by Kriegsmarine, 1939

Nazi Germany
- Name: Orion
- Namesake: Orion
- Operator: Kriegsmarine
- Yard number: 1
- Acquired: Requisitioned 1939
- Commissioned: 9 December 1939
- Renamed: Orion (1939); Hektor (1944); Orion (1945)
- Reclassified: Auxiliary cruiser Orion, 9 December 1939
- Nickname(s): HSK-1; Schiff-36; Raider A
- Fate: Sunk by air raid, 4 May 1945

General characteristics
- Tonnage: 7,021 GRT, 3,540 NRT
- Displacement: 15,700 tons
- Length: 148 m (486 ft)
- Beam: 18.6 m (61 ft)
- Draught: 8.2 m (27 ft)
- Propulsion: 4 × steam turbines, 1 × shaft, 4 × boilers, 6,200 shp (4.6 MW)
- Speed: 14.8 knots (27.4 km/h)
- Range: 18,000 nautical miles (33,000 km)
- Complement: 356 (varying)
- Armament: 6 × 15 cm (5.9 in) SK L/45 (taken from battleship Schleswig-Holstein; 1 × 7.5 cm (3.0 in) gun; 2 × 3.7 cm (1.5 in) SK C/30; 4 × 2 cm (0.79 in) FlaK 30; 6 × 53.3 cm torpedo tubes; 228 x EMC mines
- Aircraft carried: 1 x Arado Ar 196 A-1 1 x Nakajima E8N

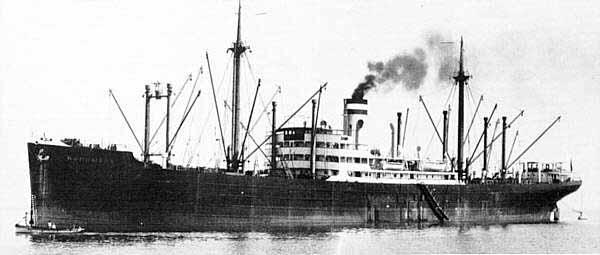
The HAPAG freighter Nordmark

Orion (HSK-1) was an auxiliary cruiser of Nazi Germany's Kriegsmarine which operated as a merchant raider in World War II. Blohm & Voss built her in Hamburg in 1930–31 as the cargo ship Kurmark. The navy requisitioned her at the start of World War II, had her converted into the auxiliary cruiser Orion, and commissioned her on 9 December 1939. Known to the Kriegsmarine as Schiff 36, her Royal Navy designation was Raider A. She was named after the constellation Orion.

== Construction and conversion ==
Blohm & Voss in Hamburg built the ship as a freighter for the Hamburg America Line (HAPAG). To save money, steam turbines from the liner New York were re-used. That proved a poor decision, since the Orion was plagued for her entire life by engine problems.

After the war began, the German Seekriegsleitung (Naval Operations Command) was ill-prepared for raider warfare. The operations of the German auxiliary cruisers of World War I were evaluated by German military planners and considered a great success, having disrupted British merchant shipping around the world. However the overall effect on the war was evaluated as having been rather minor and so only a small program of converting merchant ships into auxiliary cruisers was initiated on 5 September 1939.

The first two ships being requisitioned were the Kurmark (Orion) and the Neumark (German auxiliary cruiser Widder), and conversion started immediately.

== Raider voyage ==
One of Germany's first auxiliary cruisers in World War II, Orion left Germany on 6 April 1940, under the command of Korvettenkapitän (later Fregattenkapitän) Kurt Weyher. Disguised as a neutral ship she passed south through the Atlantic Ocean, where she attacked and sank Haxby, a 5,207 GRT freighter.

In May 1940 Orion rounded Cape Horn and entered the Pacific Ocean. She entered New Zealand waters in June 1940 and laid mines off Auckland during the night of 13–14 June 1940, one of which sank the ocean liner RMS Niagara five days later. Two other ships struck mines from Orion, as did two trawlers and an auxiliary minesweeper.

Orion then raided across the Indian and Pacific Oceans attacking four more ships. One ship, the Norwegian freighter Tropic Sea, was captured without a fight and sent to occupied France as a prize, though she was scuttled in the Bay of Biscay after encountering HMS Truant. The other ships encountered by Orion were sunk.

On 20 October 1940 she rendezvoused with the German auxiliary cruiser Komet and supply ship Kulmerland. Operating together, they sank another seven ships, including the liner Rangitane and five ships off Nauru, before going their separate ways in the new year.

The German naval attaché to Japan, Vice-Admiral Paul Wenneker, bought a Nakajima E8N float plane early in 1941. It was dispatched on board the supply ship Münsterland to rendezvous with Orion at the Maug Islands in the Northern Marianas. They met on 1 February 1941, and Orion thus became the only German naval ship of World War II to use a Japanese float plane.

Another six months cruising in the Indian Ocean yielded nothing, though she did encounter and capture her final victim, Chaucer, in July 1941, in the South Atlantic when Orion was on her way home.

Orion returned to Bordeaux in occupied France on 23 August 1941. After 510 days and 127,337 nautical miles (235,828 km) at sea she had sunk ten ships with a combined tonnage of 62,915 gross register tons (GRT), plus two more (totalling 21,125 GRT) in cooperation with Komet.

The German freighter Anneliese Essberger, disguised as the Norwegian freighter Herstein, was meant to meet the Orion on 30 Aug. 1941. The planned rendezvous was Point Corona at 28 degrees N, 43 degrees W. But the freighter failed to see the Orion, and continued north.

== Later history ==
De-commissioned as a commerce raider, the ship was renamed Hektor in 1944 and was used as artillery training ship. In January 1945 she was again renamed Orion and was used to take refugees from Germany's eastern provinces across the Baltic Sea to ports in northern Germany and occupied Denmark. On her way to Copenhagen on 4 May 1945, after she had picked up the crew of the old battleship Schlesien, Orion was hit by two bombs dropped by aircraft of the Soviet 51st Mine-Torpedo Aviation Regiment off Swinemünde. The crew managed to beach the fiercely burning ship on a sandbank, but more than 150 passengers and crew were killed. The hulk was scrapped in 1952.

== Raiding history ==
=== Sunk by Orion ===
- 1940-04-24 Haxby 5,207 GRT
- 1940-06-19 Tropic Sea 8,750 GRT
- 1940-08-16 Notou 2,489 GRT
- 1940-08-20 Turakina 9,691 GRT
- 1940-10-14 Ringwood 7,203 GRT
- 1941-07-29 Chaucer 5,792 GRT

=== Sunk by mines laid by Orion ===
- 1940-06-19 RMS Niagara 13,415 GRT
- 1941-05-14 HMNZS Puriri 927 GRT

(The claims by several sources that the freighters Port Bowen and Baltannic were also victims of the Orion's mines, seem, on examination of the records now available, to be unsubstantiated.)

Movements of the three German ships in December 1940 and January 1941

=== In concert with Komet ===
- 1940-11-25 Holmwood 546 GRT
- 1940-11-27 Rangitane 16,712 GRT
- 1940-12-06 Triona 4,413 GRT
- 1940-12-08 Triadic 6,378 GRT
- 1940-12-08 Triaster6,032 GRT
