= Peter Phipps (admiral) =

New Zealand navy officer (1908–1989)

Sir Peter Phipps
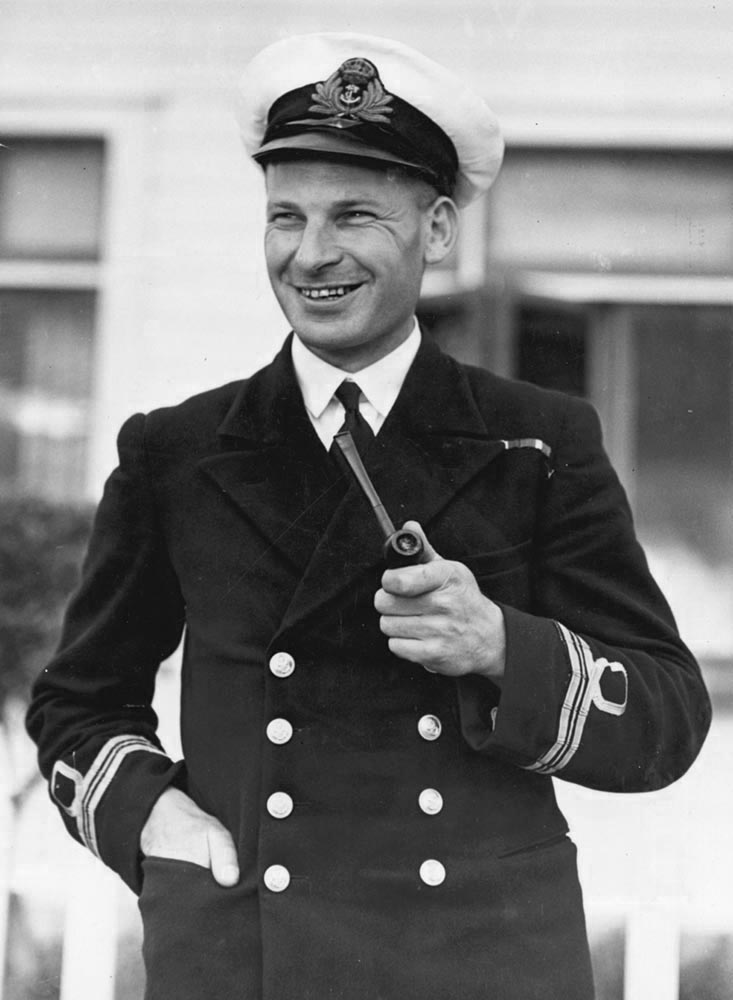
- Born: 7 December 1908; Sydney, Australia
- Died: 18 September 1989 (aged 80); Marlborough, New Zealand
- Military career
- Allegiance: New Zealand
- Branch: Royal New Zealand Navy
- Service years: 1928–1965
- Rank: Vice Admiral
- Commands: Chief of Defence Staff; Chief of Naval Staff; HMS Royalist; HMNZS Philomel; HMNZS Moa; HMNZS Scarba
- Conflicts: Second World War
- Awards: Knight Commander of the Order of the British Empire; Distinguished Service Cross & Bar; Navy Cross (United States)

Vice Admiral Sir Peter Phipps, KBE, DSC & Bar, VRD (7 December 1908 – 18 September 1989) was a senior officer of the Royal New Zealand Navy (RNZN) from the 1940s to 1960s.

Born in Sydney, Australia, Phipps served with the Royal Navy and then RNZN during the Second World War. He was awarded the Distinguished Service Cross (DSC) in 1941 for his service as commander of an anti-submarine trawler in English waters. He later served in the Solomon Islands and for his part in the sinking of a Japanese submarine at Guadalcanal, he was awarded a bar to his DSC and the United States of America awarded him the Navy Cross, their second highest award for valour. In the postwar period, he was seconded to the Royal Navy for a time and also commanded the cruiser HMNZS Royalist. Phipps was the first New Zealander to reach the rank of vice admiral in the RNZN. He was also served as Chief of Naval Staff and the first Chief of Defence Staff. He was killed in a car accident in 1989.

== Early life ==
Born on 7 December 1908 in Sydney, Australia, Peter Phipps was the son of Fanny Seymour née McOwen. His mother had married Claude Seymour. He was raised in Christchurch. After completing his education at Christchurch Boys’ High School in 1926, he found employment at the National Bank of New Zealand.

Developing an interest in the sea following sailing trips with Scott, Phipps joined the Sea Scouts. He took part in a voyage from Christchurch to Wellington aboard the light cruiser HMS Chatham and a few years later, in 1928, he enlisted in the Royal Naval Volunteer Reserve (RNVR) as an ordinary seaman. He was commissioned as an officer two years later.

In 1933, Phipps moved to Hokitika, on the West Coast, continuing in his career with the National Bank. He remained there until 1936, at which time he shifted north, to Wellington. He also transferred to the Wellington branch of the RNVR. Late the following year, he was involved in a boating accident while in command of a whaler. It had capsized while cruising in Wellington Harbour and he freed a sailor that had been trapped in the upturned superstructure.

== Second World War ==
On the outbreak of the Second World War, Phipps was called up for military service and posted to the Navy Office in Wellington, where he served as an intelligence officer. In May 1940, he was seconded to the Royal Navy and traveled to the United Kingdom where he was given his first command. This was the anti-submarine trawler HMS Bay, part of the 24th Minesweeping/Anti-Submarine Flotilla, which operated on convoy duties in the English Channel. On his first trip in Bay, it was struck by two bombs which failed to explode. In July 1941, he was promoted to lieutenant commander. He performed competently as the captain of Bay and was recommended for higher command. He had earlier been awarded the Distinguished Service Cross (DSC) for "For courage and devotion to duty in Channel Convoys".

In late 1941 Phipps transferred to the newly formed Royal New Zealand Navy (RNZN) and appointed commander of HMNZS Scarba, one of four Isles class minesweeping trawlers purchased for New Zealand. After an initial period of time spent doing escort duties, the Scarba left British waters in March 1942 as part of a convoy bound for Canada, before travelling onto New Zealand, where it arrived on 4 August 1942. Phipps then became the commanding officer of HMNZS Moa, another minesweeper vessel but of the Bird-class. At the time, the morale of the crew was low but Phipps soon improved their spirits and overall efficiency. The Moa was part of the RNZN's 25th Minesweeping Flotilla which, served in Noumea from September to December. However Moa was detached for some of this time doing escort duties around Norfolk Island. On 9 December 1942, the flotilla was sent to support the Allied operations in the Solomon Islands.

=== Service in the Solomons ===
The flotilla was initially used in anti-submarine patrols around Guadalcanal's Cape Esperance and on 29 January 1943, Moa along with her sister ship Kiwi, sank the Japanese submarine I-1 which was supporting Operation Ke during the Guadalcanal Campaign. Both ships were patrolling at Guadalcanal and Kiwi's depth-charge attack brought the submarine to the surface. She attempted to escape but was rammed by Kiwi while Moa continued to provide illumination with star shells. Moa pursued and pressed home the attack upon the I-1, which eventually ran aground on a reef. Two days later, Moa attacked Japanese landing barges, sinking one of them. Phipps was awarded a bar to his DSC and the United States Navy Cross for these actions.

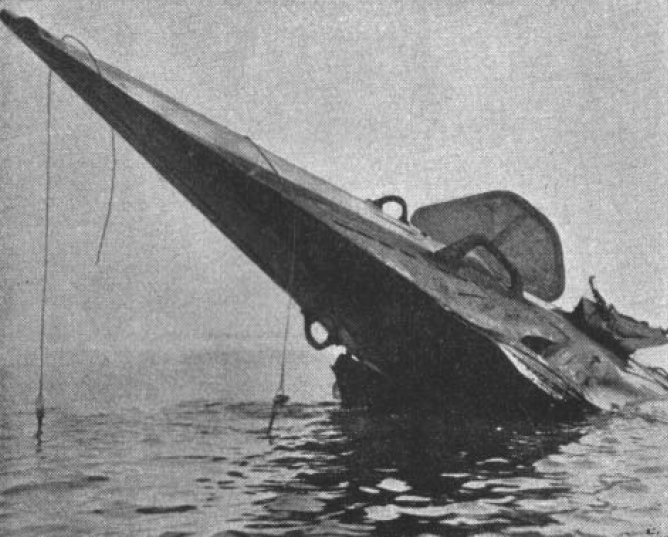
The wreck of the Japanese submarine I-1, sunk by Moa and Kiwi

In April 1943, Moa was sunk when it was attacked while refueling at Tulagi Harbour, by Aichi D3A "Val" dive bombers. The attack killed five seamen and wounded another 15. One of the wounded was Phipps, who had a bomb penetrate the roof of his cabin and pass through the floor where it exploded beneath him. He received shrapnel injuries and also broken bones in his ankles. His injuries were such that he returned to New Zealand to convalesce. After 12 months of recovery, he was promoted to commander and appointed to lead the 25th Minesweeping Flotilla, still in the Solomon Islands. His vessel, HMNZS Matai, was the lead ship up until December 1944, at which time he switched to HMNZS Arabis. Under his command, the flotilla built a reputation for efficiency and good work. He was the New Zealand Government's representative at the surrender of the Japanese forces in Nauru and Ocean Island.

== Postwar career ==
After the war, Phipps remained in the RNZN. He commanded the training base HMNZS Philomel, where in April 1947 he had to deal with a mutiny of sailors from the base and several ships, over low pay and poor working conditions. He diplomatically handled the situation to the satisfaction of both his senior officer and the disaffected sailors. He then became the executive officer of the cruiser HMNZS Bellona. He struggled in this capacity in light of his background, coming from the RNVR, as well as his lack of experience on larger vessels. He went on to command HMNZS Tamaki, a naval training station on Motuihe Island.

In 1952, Phipps was promoted to captain and the following year undertook a series of technical courses in England. He then spent 18 months on an exchange with the Royal Navy; he served as the Deputy Director of the Operations Division at the Admiralty. The position was normally filled by a more senior officer but he performed satisfactorily. In 1955, the RNZN was in the progress of upgrading its fleet and arranged the purchase of HMS Royalist to replace Bellona. When Phipps was consulted, he counseled against the purchase, believing it would be a disaster for New Zealand. He then found out that he was to become the first commander of the new ship, to be designated HMNZS Royalist. In September 1955, he took charge of Bellona for its voyage from New Zealand back to the United Kingdom in preparation for the exchange with Royalist. He took formal command of Royalist in April 1956, having delayed its commissioning by ten days due to his dissatisfaction with its condition.

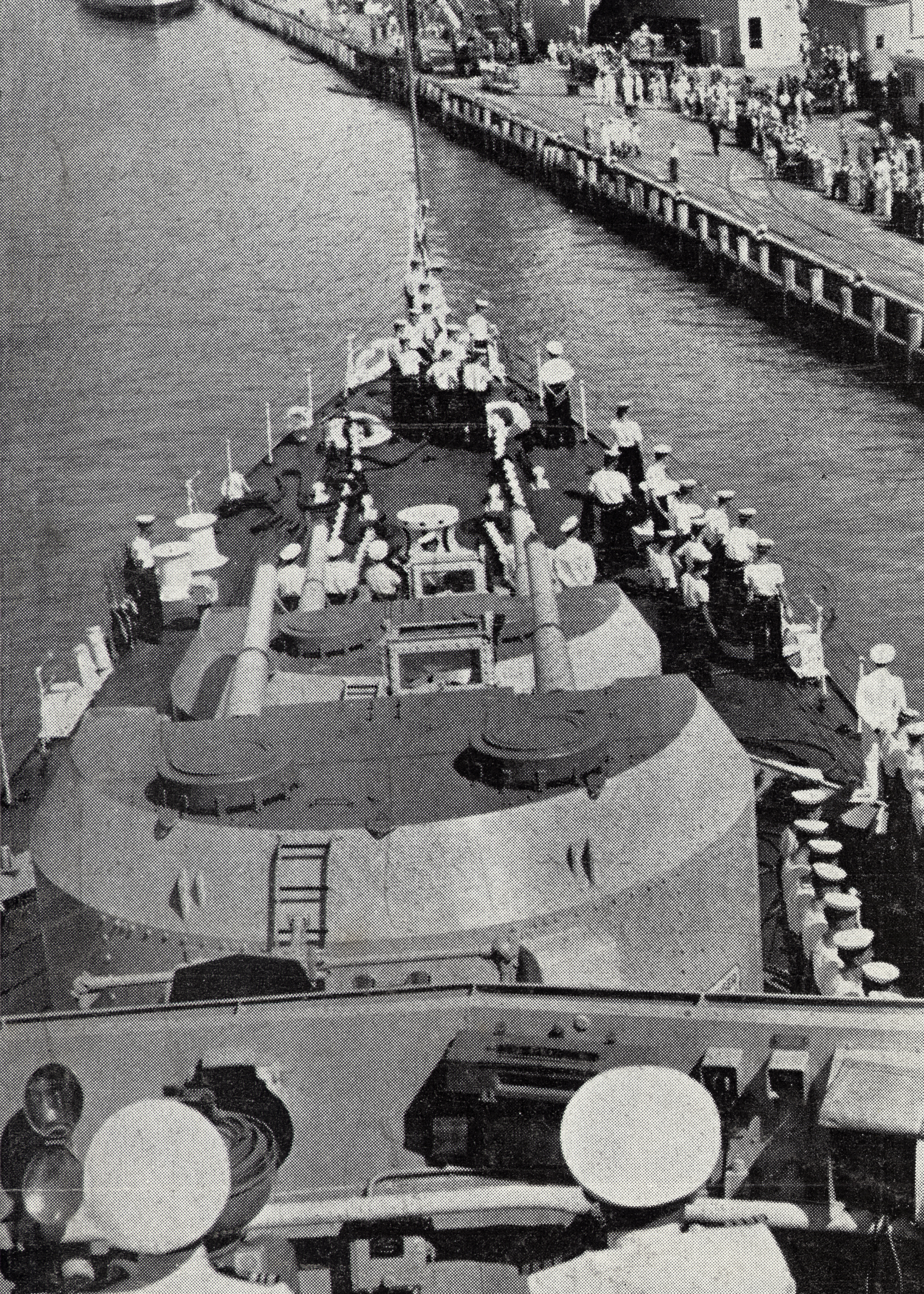
HMNZS Royalist berthing at the Devonport Naval Base, December 1956

Royalist was based in Malta while its crew learnt their operational duties. It nearly became involved in the Suez Crisis as part of the Mediterranean Fleet but pressure from the New Zealand Government saw it withdrawn. The ship arrived in New Zealand in December 1956 and Phipps relinquished his command of the ship. An appointment to the New Zealand Naval Board followed; he was the first New Zealander to serve on the board. On 1 April 1960, Phipps, now a rear admiral, was named Chief of Naval Staff, the first New Zealander to hold the post. His appointment caused some controversy; it was tradition that an officer from the Royal Navy be named in the position but the New Zealand Government felt this may not be in the country's best interest. The First Sea Lord of the Admiralty, Lord Mountbatten protested the decision but to no avail.

In 1963, Phipps was appointed the first Chief of Defence Staff. He played a role in the establishment of the Ministry of Defence, working alongside Dean Eyre, the Minister of Defence at the time. He was knighted for his services in the 1964 Queen's Birthday Honours, having previously been appointed a Commander of the Order of the British Empire (Military Division) in the 1962 New Year Honours. Shortly before his retirement on 30 June 1965, he was promoted to vice admiral.

== Later life ==
In his retirement, Phipps lived in the Marlborough Sounds. He was involved in the directorship of a few companies but spent most of his time sailing and breeding geckos native to New Zealand. In 1983 his wife, Jessie née Hutton, who he had married in 1938, died. Four years later, he was married again, to Olwen Jones. He died in a car crash on 18 September 1989. He was survived by his second wife and three children from his first marriage.

Phipps' medals are held by the National Museum of the Royal New Zealand Navy and include his neck badge for the Knight Commander of the Order of the British Empire, the Distinguished Service Cross and bar, Navy Cross as well as his service and campaign awards: the 1939-45 Star, the Atlantic Star, Pacific Star, War Medal 1939-45, New Zealand War Service Medal, Volunteer Reserve Decoration, and the 1953 Coronation Medal.

== Notes ==
Military offices
New title	Chief of the Defence Staff; 1963–1965	Succeeded by Lieutenant General Sir Leonard Thornton
Preceded by Rear Admiral Michael Villiers	Chief of Naval Staff; 1960–1963	Succeeded by Rear Admiral Richard Washbourn
