= John Ross (RNZN officer) =

Officer in the Royal New Zealand Navy

- Born: John O'Connell Ross; 9 December 1916; Port Chalmers, New Zealand
- Died: 13 February 1983 (aged 66); Lower Hutt, New Zealand
- Military career
- Allegiance: New Zealand
- Branch: Royal New Zealand Navy
- Service years: 1939–1969
- Rank: Rear Admiral
- Commands: HMNZS Kaniere; HMNZS Royalist; Chief of Naval Staff
- Conflicts: Second World War; Korean War
- Awards: Companion of the Order of the Bath; Commander of the Order of the British Empire
- Other work: Historian

Rear Admiral John O'Connell Ross, CB, CBE (9 December 1916 – 13 February 1983) was an officer of the Royal New Zealand Navy (RNZN) from the 1940s to the late 1960s, ending his military career as the Chief of Naval Staff. He was also an author of naval and maritime histories.

From Port Chalmers, Ross was a member of the Royal Naval Volunteer Reserve when he was called up for service with the RNZN during the Second World War. He remained in the RNZN in the postwar period, serving on cruisers and in a training role. During the Korean War, he served aboard the frigate HMNZS Tutira and later commanded HMNZS Kaniere and afterwards served in senior naval assignments on various RNZN cruisers. After a period in command of the cruiser HMNZS Royalist, he became Chief of Naval Staff in 1965. Retiring from the RNZN in 1969, he wrote history books in his later years. He died in 1983 at the age of 67.

== Early life ==
John O'Connell Ross was born in Port Chalmers, in Otago, New Zealand, on 9 December 1916. His father, Murdoch, was a mariner who worked for the Union Steam Ship Company. Employed in the public service, in 1936 Ross enlisted in the Canterbury Division of the Royal Naval Volunteer Reserve.

== Second World War ==
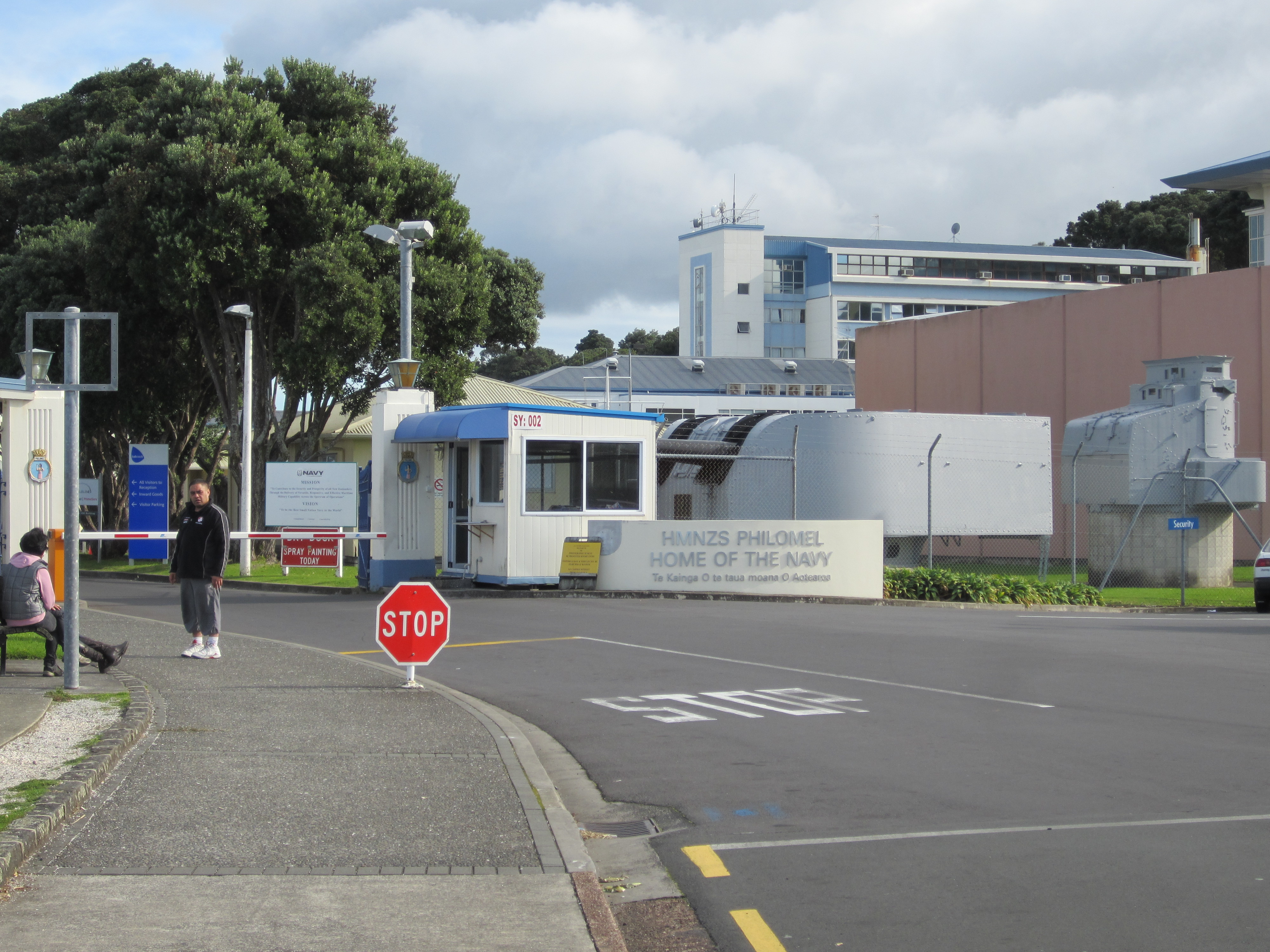
Main gates of the Devonport Naval Base

Called up for service in the New Zealand Division of the Royal Navy on the outbreak of the Second World War in 1939, Ross served briefly on the cruiser HMS Achilles before commencing officer training on the training ship HMS Philomel at Devonport Naval Base. In 1941, now serving in the Royal New Zealand Navy (RNZN) following its establishment that year, he was assigned to HMNZS Wakakura, a trawler minesweeper, as its executive officer. The following year he served aboard HMNZS Matai, the lead ship of the 25th Minesweeping Flotilla, working in the Southwest Pacific during the Solomon Islands campaign. The final years of his war service was spent in the United Kingdom receiving specialist gunnery training.

== Postwar period ==
On his return to New Zealand in 1946, Ross was granted a permanent commission in the RNZN and was posted to HMNZS Achilles and subsequently served on the light cruiser HMNZS Bellona. In mid-1948 he commenced a training role at HMNZS Philomel, the RNZN's shore station at Devonport Naval Base. On the outbreak of the Korean War in June 1950, he was serving aboard the Loch-class frigate HMNZS Tutira. In response to a request to the New Zealand government from the United Nations Security Council for military assistance, Tutira departed Auckland on 3 July for Japan. It was involved in escort duties for supply ships making for Pusan in South Korea and in September protected troopships during Operation Chromite, the landing of United Nations forces at Inchon. Tutira's service in Korea ended in December.

Ross, now holding the rank of lieutenant commander, was given command of HMNZS Kaniere in January 1951. The vessel was another Loch-class frigate and served as a training vessel for naval recruits and conscripts. It undertook supply trips to Raoul Island and Campbell Island for the meteorological stations there. In January 1952 Ross was promoted to commander and that year returned to Philomel to serve as the executive officer there. The following year he went to a staff role at the Navy Office in Wellington.

In 1955 Ross was appointed executive officer aboard the Dido-class cruiser HMNZS Black Prince, and subsequently assumed this position in Bellona and then aboard the light cruiser HMS Royalist. Promoted to captain in January 1957, later in the year he was posted to London to serve as the RNZN's liaison officer there. Ross returned to New Zealand in 1960 to take up the position of Commodore, Auckland, responsibile for the RNZN base at Devonport and the ships based there.

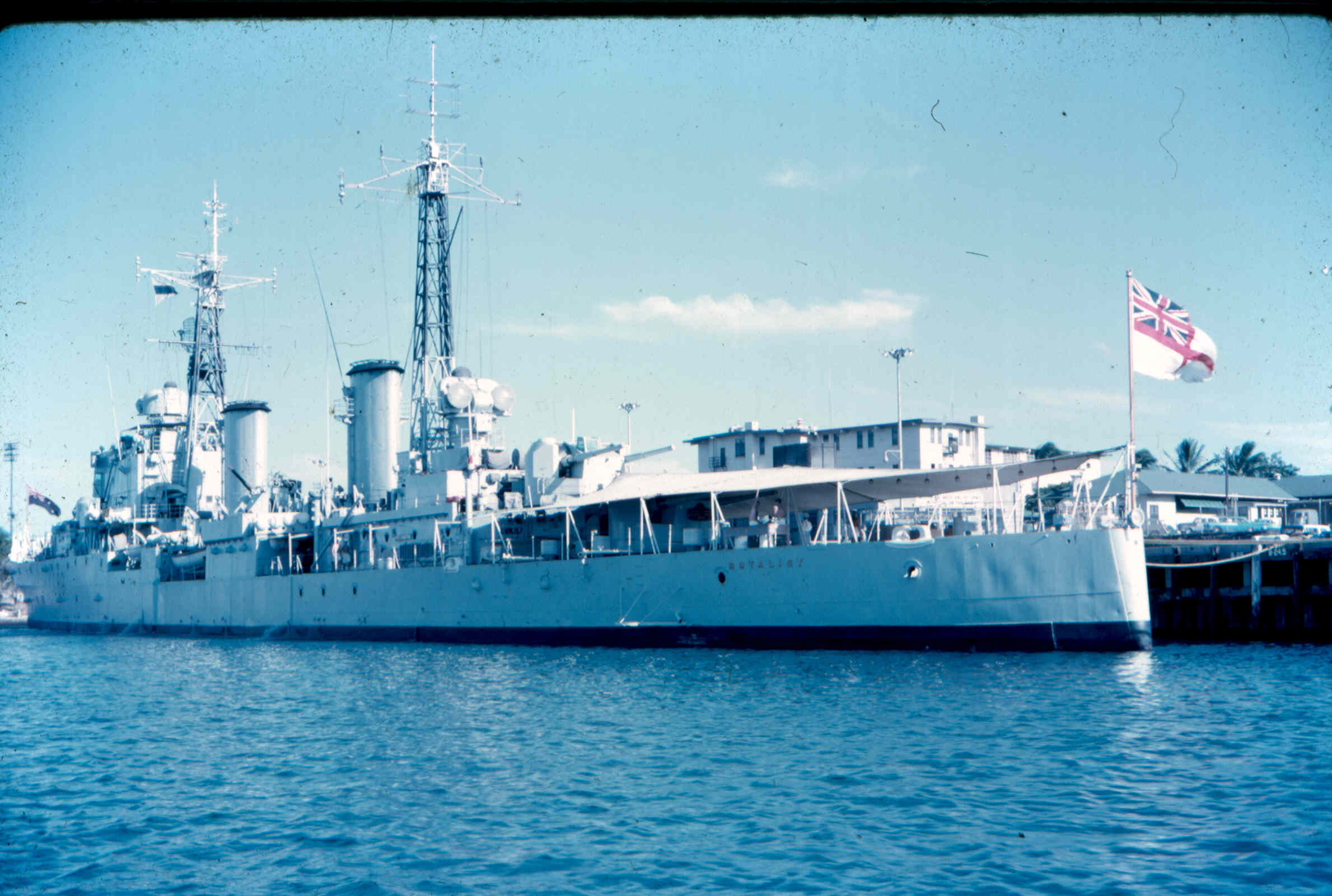
Royalist at berth in 1962

In October 1961, Ross took command of Royalist, by then the only cruiser in the RNZN's fleet. The ship was due to undergo a refit and Ross retained his Commodore, Auckland, appointment during this time. He was later sent to the United Kingdom to attend the Imperial Defence College and was seconded to the Royal Navy for a time. In the 1964 Birthday Honours, he was appointed a Commander of the Order of the British Empire.

The following year Ross succeeded Richard Washbourn as the Chief of Naval Staff (CNS), the commander of the RNZN. By this time, Royalist was about to be decommissioned leaving the RNZN without any cruisers. Rather than take on a similar replacement vessel Ross advocated for the expansion of the RNZN's fleet of three frigates to six but was inhibited by the expense involved. In the end, he had to be satisfied with four. Ross also oversaw the introduction into service of the RNZN's own ensign rather than the traditional Royal Navy flag previously used, marking the increased independence of the New Zealand service from that of the United Kingdom. He was made a Companion of the Order of the Bath in the 1967 New Year Honours.

After four years of service as CNS, Ross retired as a rear admiral in June 1969. By this time he was a published author; The White Ensign in Early New Zealand, a history of the Royal Navy during the New Zealand Wars, was published by A. H. & A. W. Reed in 1967.

== Later life ==
In his retirement Ross wrote more works of naval and maritime history. This Stern Coast, a work on the charting of New Zealand's coastline was published in 1969; and Pride in Their Ports, a book on New Zealand's smaller ports was published in 1977 by Dunmore Press, and was favourably reviewed. He also was the president of the Royal Port Nicholson Yacht Club for several years. Ross died suddenly on 13 February 1983 at Hutt Hospital in Lower Hutt.

== Notes ==
Military offices
Preceded by Rear Admiral Richard Washbourn	Chief of Naval Staff; 1965–1969	Succeeded by Rear Admiral Lawrence Carr
