= 1947 Royal New Zealand Navy mutinies =

Series of mutinies in the New Zealand navy

During April 1947, the Royal New Zealand Navy (RNZN) experienced a series of non-violent mutinies amongst the enlisted sailors of four ships and two shore bases. Over 20 per cent of the RNZN's enlisted personnel were punished or discharged for their involvement. The main cause was the poor rates of pay compared to the rest of the New Zealand Defence Force and equivalent civilian wages, exacerbated by the release of a long overdue government review which failed to address the issue. Sailors saw the new pay rates as still inferior to the other branches of the military, with the increases being consumed by taxes, inflation, and the cancellation of allowances and benefits. The poor living and working conditions aboard RNZN ships was another issue, compounded by sailors having no effective way to make dissatisfaction known to the higher ranks. Dissatisfaction with peacetime duties and opportunities also contributed, with many sailors locked into enlistment periods of up to 12 years, and demobilisation efforts prioritising those enlisted specifically for the duration of the Second World War.

On 1 April, around 100 sailors from the shore base HMNZS Philomel, in Devonport, declared their intent to refuse duty. They were joined by another 100 personnel from the cruiser HMNZS Black Prince and the corvette HMNZS Arbutus, who marched off the base. After campaigning for three days and winning the right to backdated pay, the mutineers were given a choice: return to duty and accept punishment, or be discharged. The majority chose the latter. These men were financially penalised, denied access to veterans' benefits, and suffered government bans on employing them. The 23 who returned to duty were punished through rank reductions, reductions in rank and pay, or short periods of imprisonment. On 8 April, seven sailors at the shore base HMNZS Tasman, in Lyttelton, refused to work and demanded to be discharged. Also that morning, the captain of the Castle-class minesweeper HMNZS Hautapu was presented a letter detailing sailor's dissatisfaction with the handling of lower-deck committees, and eleven sailors deserted. Some returned to duty voluntarily, but the rest were arrested by police. Punishment (for those who returned voluntarily and those arrested) consisted of sentences of 60 days imprisonment, commuted to 14 to 24 days.

At the time of the initial mutiny, the cruiser HMNZS Bellona was in Australian waters, and when the ship returned to New Zealand in late April, several sailors sought discharge. On Anzac Day (25 April), about 100 of Bellona's ship's company decided not to return to duty. They recruited 40 sailors waiting to be posted to the Philomel, and on 28 April, the group presented their demands to the captain. They were informed that anyone not reporting for duty the following day would be considered Absent Without Leave. The next morning, 52 sailors were marked as having deserted, although all but 20 returned before Bellona's next deployment two months later. The Bellona mutineers received punishments of up to 92 days imprisonment, while the deserters additionally lost all unpaid pay and allowances. Arrest warrants were issued for those who did not return, with one sailor at large for over two years. The mutinies and the resulting manpower shortage forced the RNZN to remove Black Prince from service, and set the navy's planned development and expansion back by a decade. Despite this impact, the size and scope of the events have been downplayed.

== Causes ==
From the navy's inception in 1941, there were concerns about sailors' pay and conditions. By the end of the Second World War, naval pay was well behind equivalent ranks in the New Zealand Army and the Royal New Zealand Air Force, and much lower than wages for equivalent jobs in the civilian sector. Sailors were forced to accept this instead of seeking work elsewhere, as they had enlisted for set periods during the war; some were required to complete twelve years service. Following the war's end, a review of pay was initiated. During his 1943 re-election campaign, the Prime Minister, Peter Fraser, promised that new pay scales would be established by 1 April 1946; if there were any delays, the pay rates would be backdated, and the sailors would receive the difference as a lump sum.

The review was published on 1 April, although many sailors learned of the details from contacts during the preceding weekend of 29–30 March. While an improvement, the new pay rates were still half that of the Army and Air Force, and most, if not all, of the increase would end up absorbed by increasing tax rates. Several benefits or allowances were either removed (for example, uniformed personnel were no longer allowed free travel on public transport without a voucher) or were not modified to compensate for inflation (for example, uniform allowances remained at pre-war levels, despite the threefold increase in uniform prices). The promised backdating was not mentioned in the initial announcement, resulting in great dissatisfaction amongst the sailors. A later announcement clarified that the backdating would occur, but it is unclear whether doing so was originally intended, or added because of the mutiny.

Many of the sailors who had signed up for long periods during the war were finding themselves dissatisfied with peacetime duties and conditions. Some attempted to secure a discharge as they thought there would be better opportunities and pay in civilian jobs, but demobilisation efforts were focused on the personnel who had signed up under "Hostilities Only" conditions. The two ships on which the mutiny originated, the Dido-class cruiser HMNZS Black Prince and the Flower-class corvette HMNZS Arbutus, were both considered to have poor accommodation and seakeeping, particularly when wartime upgrades decreased the space available and increased the number of personnel required to operate them.

Enlisted personnel felt that their concerns about service conditions were not being considered by the navy. Following requests and demands for a formal channel through which sailors could express their grievances, the Admiralty had approved the formation of lower-deck committees. New Zealand authorities had reluctantly agreed to this, but the committees were banned from considering or making proposals to the officers on the matters of pay, shipboard routine or service conditions; the issues that affected the sailors the most. Of the 219 recommendations made by various committees to higher authorities, only 6 had been approved for consideration, and only 1 was implemented. The National Museum of the Royal New Zealand Navy partially attributes the lack of concern for lower-deck welfare to the breakdown of chains of communication as divisional officers were demobilised, along with the broader disruption caused by demobilisation efforts.

== Mutinies ==
=== Philomel, Black Prince, and Arbutus ===
At the time of the mutiny, Black Prince was docked at the shore base HMNZS Philomel, in Devonport. The cruiser was undergoing a refit, which affected the living and working conditions of the personnel. The most extreme example was the closure of the ship's heads, which coincided with a bout of dysentery: to leave the ship and use the toilets ashore, a sailor required express permission from his supervisor, and when one man headed ashore without permission, he received seven days punishment.

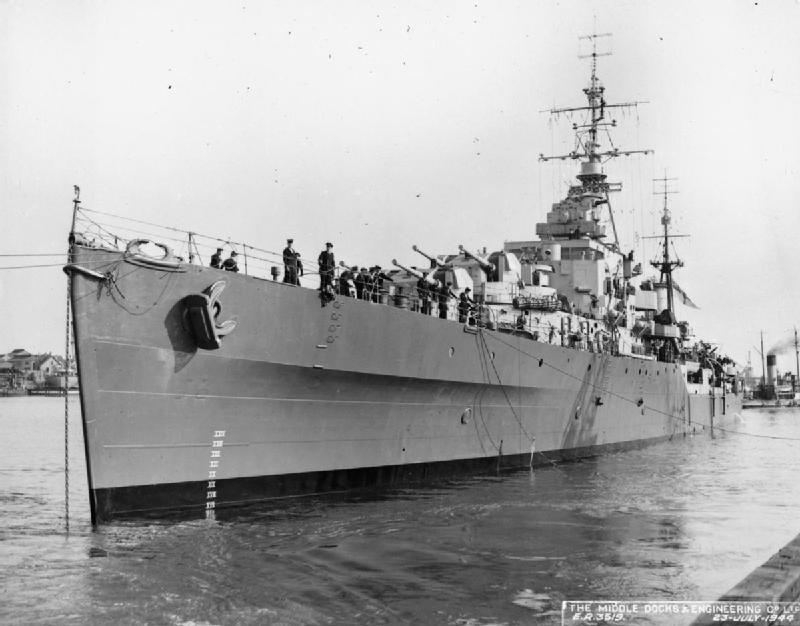
Black Prince in 1944, during the ship's earlier Royal Navy career

Arbutus was secured alongside Black Prince, having just returned from a two-month show the flag cruise around the Pacific Islands. The deployment had seen several incidents, the first of which occurred while the ship was docked in Tahiti; sailors who were meant to be guarding the ship became drunk, after which a crowd of Tahitians attempted to board the ship and remove equipment. On departure, the corvette sailed into a heavy storm, which lasted for several days. Waves breaking over the bow rendered the bridge unusable, and many aboard—including the ship's cat, for the first and only time in its life—were seasick. Water contamination of the fuel oil taken on in Tahiti damaged the propulsion machinery, further adding to the problems. When Arbutus finally limped into port, the ship's company were informed that they would only remain at Philomel long enough to take on aviation fuel and supplies to be delivered to the Cook Islands.

During Monday 31 March, there were spontaneous gatherings of sailors, during which they discovered the pay review, shipboard conditions, and the ineffectiveness of the lower-deck committees. Rumours were being spread that an announcement on pay rates would come the following day, but they would not be backdated as promised. Most came to the conclusion that the only way to bring attention to these issues was to mutiny in protest.

==== Tuesday 1 April ====
At morning parade on Tuesday 1 April, around 100 sailors of Philomel informed the base commander, Commander Peter Phipps, that they intended to refuse duty in protest of the government's failure to make the new pay rates retrospective. After the Philomel mutineers left the parade ground, word circulated around the base and the ships that there would be a gathering in the base canteen at 12:00. Phipps had been aware of the sailors' dissatisfaction over the previous few days, but when he informed his superiors of their actions, the reply simply informed him that the details of the pay review would be published that evening. The commander ordered all Philomel personnel to assemble in the gymnasium at midday, but nobody below the rank of petty officer attended. After addressing those in the gymnasium, Phipps went to the canteen to talk to the sailors there: after asking them to return to duty and giving the news that the pay scales would be published that evening, he informed them that they had already committed acts of indiscipline, and "would have to take the consequences". Although aware that their actions constituted mutiny, the sailors were too frustrated with the situation to care.

After discussing the causes of their dissatisfaction, those at the canteen meeting (which now included a number of sailors from Black Prince) decided to present a petition to the Naval Board with three demands, that the new pay rates were to be made retrospective to 1 April 1946, lower-deck committees needed to be capable of addressing issues with pay and service conditions, and the sailors were not to be punished for their actions. Phipps noted the details of the petition, and left to communicate with the Naval Board. The bosun's pipe to resume work was sounded at 13:00, but the sailors decided that they would "go on strike" in protest instead. Although mutinying, the sailors remained calm and in control of their actions, and endeavoured to make clear that their grievances were with the government, not the navy. When moving around the base, they had conducted themselves in an orderly and disciplined fashion, and those disembarking from Black Prince had saluted the White Ensign as required. They also took care to ensure their actions could not be attributed to external factors; for example, when one sailor drank rum with his lunch, he was encouraged to return to duty, so nobody could claim the mutineers were acting under the influence of alcohol.

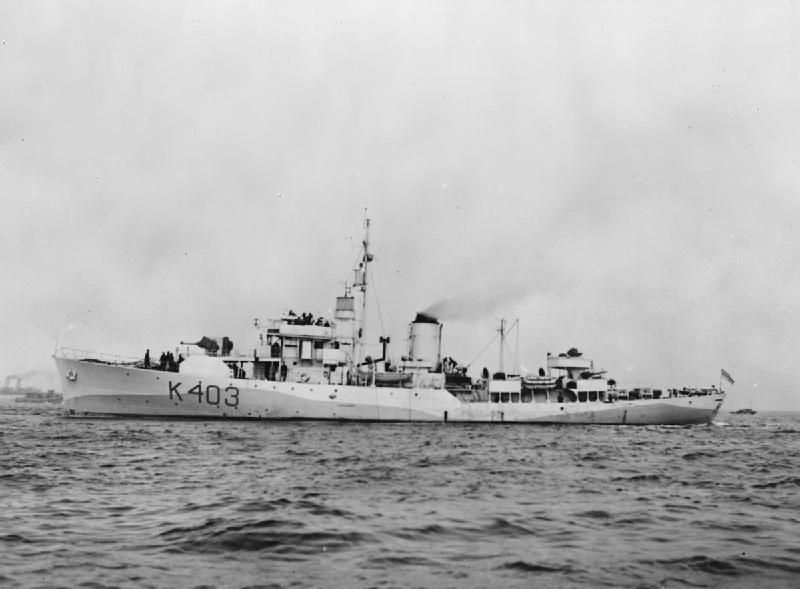
HMNZS Arbutus in 1943

At 14:00, a group of mutineers went to talk to the ship's company of Arbutus, who had been confined aboard ship, from the wharf. The corvette's sailors decided to join the mutiny, bringing the numbers to just over 200: the only sailors not involved were eighteen British loan personnel and the sick berth staff at the Navy Hospital. A reply from the Naval Board was received around 16:00, although the response to the sailors' petition was uncertain and unclear, particularly in relation to the backdated pay. The mutineers decided to march off the base and head for an open space. While heading for the main gate, Commander Phipps intercepted the group, and "argued desperately" for the sailors to return to duty for the duration of Governor-General of New Zealand Sir Bernard Freyberg's visit, scheduled for late that afternoon. His requests were denied, and the mutineers marched out the front gate—after some milling around, they headed for the band rotunda at the Devonport Reserve. The Governor-General's visit was called off, but as the Master-At-Arms and the senior petty officers were in ceremonial dress (including sheathed bayonets) during and after the walkout, it was incorrectly reported in the media that the mutineers would be forced back to duty at bayonet point. The sailors remained in the reserve during the afternoon, but eventually dispersed after coming to the conclusion that no response would be received from the government that day. It was not until 20:00 that Prime Minister Fraser announced that the pay rates would be retrospective.

==== Wednesday 2 April ====
Meeting at the reserve at 08:00 on Wednesday, the sailors learned of Fraser's remarks. Although not all were happy with the details of the new pay rates, it was agreed that their first demand had been met. By 08:10, the mutineers began to march to the gates of Philomel, where, upon being stopped by the Master-At-Arms, they asked to present their demands in relation to lower-deck committees and the foregoing of punishment for the mutiny to Commander Phipps. Although willing to listen to the sailors, the only response Phipps could give was that they should return to duty, accept punishment for their actions, and bring their concerns to official channels. While still at the gates, Doctor Martyn Finlay, the local member of parliament, addressed the mutineers and informed them that the government would consider their requests, with the prime minister to respond in two hours. Fraser arrived at the reserve at noon to personally address the sailors, but most had gone home by this point, with plans to reassemble the next morning. Those remaining listened as Fraser told them that queries regarding the pay package would have been better handled through official channels, and that the sailors should return to work and accept any punishment offered, but they did not take his advice.

==== Thursday 3 April ====
On Thursday morning, the mutineers went to protest at the gates of Philomel, but found them to be manned by a party of petty officers, supported by the police. Just before 08:00, Phipps announced that all sailors were to report for duty by 10:00 and be prepared to accept the consequences of the mutiny—anyone who did not would be discharged. The government was aware that a large number were unlikely to accept the offer, and accepted that this act would set the development of the RNZN back by several years. After the sailors returned to the reserve, Dr. Finlay advised them that they would likely forfeit all veterans' benefits if they persisted in their actions, but the warning had the opposite effect to that intended. The majority of the mutineers stripped off their rank and category insignias, medal ribbons, and good conduct badges, and returned to the base to collect their effects. The Master-At-Arms would only allow them onto the base individually and with an escort, and they could only claim their belongings after returning all items of uniform and equipment, even if they had been paid for through wage deductions.

Only 23 men returned to duty; they, along with the 18 British sailors, were used to form a temporary ship's company for Arbutus, allowing her to depart for the Cook Islands that afternoon. In their haste to separate the loyalists from further mutinous influences, the ship was not properly provisioned before departure, with nothing aboard to eat but canned pilchards. During the afternoon, the chief petty officers and petty officers were asked to confirm that they would not join the mutineers. Although they expressed similar concerns as the sailors (and because of the way the pay rates scaled for higher enlisted ranks, were worse off than before) and did not agree with the handling of the mutiny by the RNZN and the government, they all agreed to remain on duty. Over the following days, another 20 personnel who were sick or otherwise not present on 3 April applied to be discharged under similar conditions to the mutineers. Six were discharged, some were sailors whose previous application for demobilisation had been refused, the rest showed good reasons for ending their service on compassionate grounds.

=== Tasman and Hautapu ===
On the morning of Tuesday 8 April, at the shore base HMNZS Tasman, in Lyttelton, seven sailors refused duty and demanded a similar discharge to those at Philomel. The captain of the Castle-class minesweeper HMNZS Hautapu, that was at Timaru, was presented a letter by a party of sailors stating their dissatisfaction with the handling of lower-deck committees, and that they would not work until their issues were resolved. After it became clear that the RNZN was unlikely to commit to negotiating solutions to the sailors' problems, eleven sailors left the ship, which sailed to Tasman later that day. The mutineers at Tasman and Hautapu were working in concert.

Commander George Raymond Davis-Goff, in charge of naval personnel matters, was sent to Tasman, where he spoke to the base's personnel. Reminding them of the punishment for mutiny and of the oath of allegiance sworn on joining the navy, Davis-Goff convinced six of the refusing sailors to return to duty. One of the Hautapu mutineers changed his mind and met the ship at Tasman, where trainees from the base's electrical school were added to the minesweeper's complement so she could sail for Philomel. On reaching Devonport, Hautapu's personnel were used to help keep the base running. Arrest warrants were issued for the remaining Tasman and Hautapu mutineers, and all were arrested over the following days.

=== Bellona ===
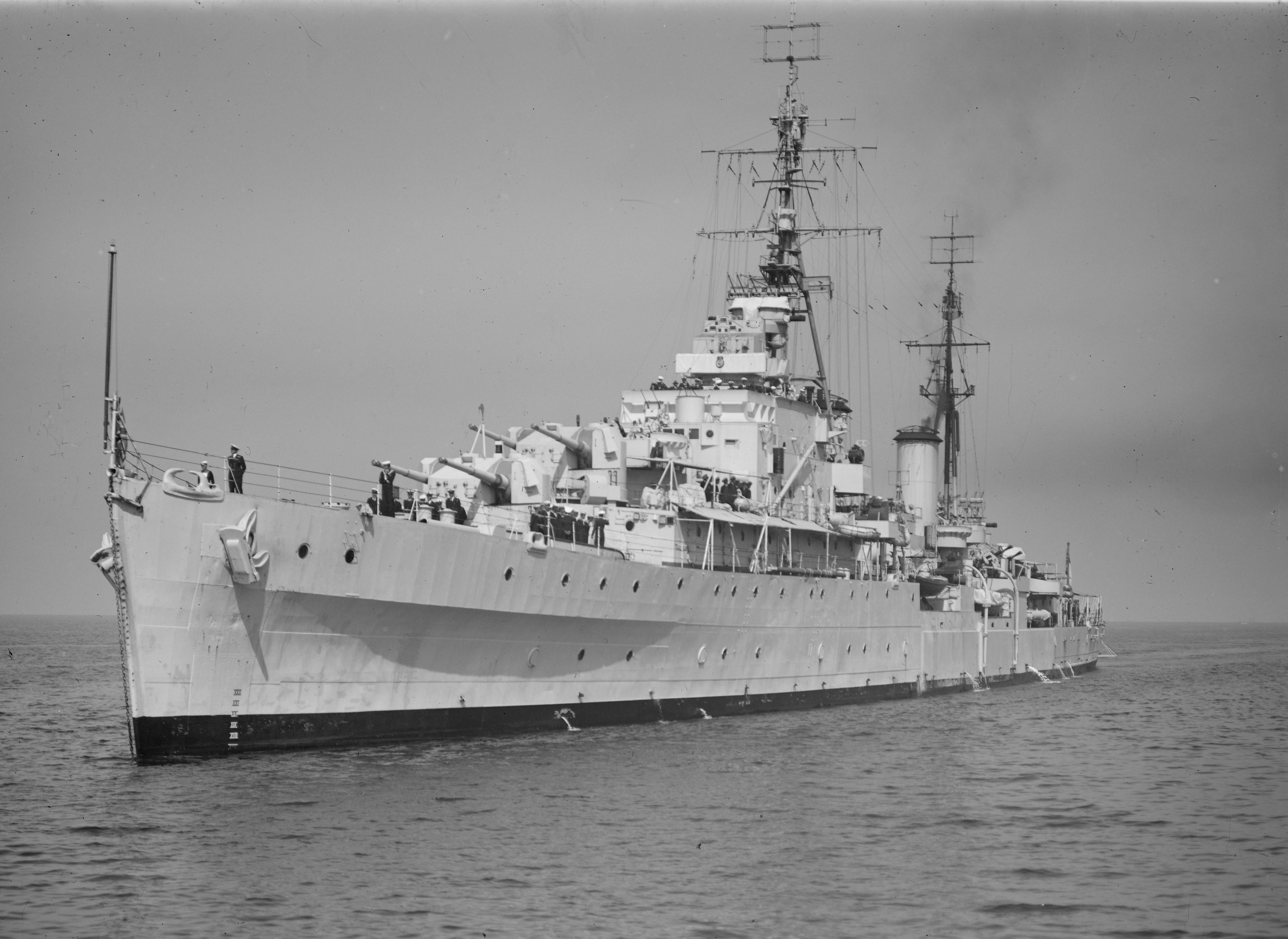
Bellona in Australian waters in 1947, shortly before the mutiny aboard

At the time of the first mutiny, the Dido-class cruiser HMNZS Bellona was undergoing training exercises with the Royal Australian Navy. Learning of the events in Devonport, the captain addressed the ship's company on 2 April on the need to maintain discipline and express concerns through proper channels. He also requested a detailed report on the new pay rates from the Naval Board, which was disseminated through the ship once received, with officers helping the sailors to prepare their concerns for transmission to the Naval Board. The cruiser returned to Devonport on 19 April, and over the next few days, rumours of a planned strike began to circulate. Bellona's captain addressed the sailors, whose concerns had shifted from pay to securing discharges similar to the main mutiny, and warned them that more severe punishments than those used for the main mutiny would be used if mutinous acts occurred.

Many of the personnel were given a day's leave to attend Anzac Day services and events on Friday 25 April. Personnel from the cruiser were concerned about how their colleagues had been treated, and during the afternoon, about 100 sailors assembled in Quay Street, Auckland, and decided to not return to duty. Like the mutineers at the start of the month, the Bellona sailors had three main demands, this time that naval pay rates be increased to match those of the Army and Air Force, that committees be established to discuss problems and improve the welfare of sailors, and that the discharged sailors not be barred from the public service. Another 40 sailors mustering at Philomel before boarding Bellona were recruited into the mutiny, these men attempted to recruit more from Bellona, but the actions of the cruiser's officers prevented any additional sailors from joining them. The party then marched off the base, despite orders to halt from the Master-at-Arms stationed at the gatehouse, then dispersed.

On Monday 28 April, a letter listing the mutineers demands was presented to the captain, with the intent that it be forwarded to the Naval Board. Demands in the letter included that pay rates be standardised in the armed forces, that service conditions improve and welfare committees be established, that personnel not be 'victimised' (punished) for joining the mutinies, and that the option to be discharged be offered. Instead of addressing the complaints, the Naval Board declared that any sailor who did not return to duty by the morning of Tuesday 29 April would be marked as Absent Without Leave. By morning parade, 52 men had failed to return.

== Aftermath ==
Over the course of the mutinies, around 20 per cent of the sailors in the RNZN were either discharged or otherwise punished for their actions. All of those discharged following the Devonport mutiny lost 10 per cent of their deferred pay, all of their accrued leave, and any backdated pay from the review. They were also denied access to veterans' benefits, such as training subsidies or housing assistance. On learning this, some sailors attempted to rejoin, but were prevented from doing so. No courts-martial were held. Although anyone with a dishonourable discharge was prevented from employment in the public service or any government-owned or -operated organisation, the government applied the ban to the mutineers, even though their discharges were not marked as 'dishonourable'. This prevented many mutineers from seeking employment in jobs that used the skills learned; the only non-military employer of telegraphists in New Zealand was the Post and Telegraph Department. The mass discharge of sailors (including 121 with combat experience) set the development of the RNZN back by around ten years. The most immediate problem was with the cruiser Black Prince, which was to return to service in June after her refit. The lack of manpower led to the refit being suspended, and the cruiser was laid up in reserve, the work did not resume until early 1952, and she was returned to service in 1953.

The 23 men who returned to duty at Philomel were charged with "taking part in a technical mutiny without violence". Punishments included reductions in rank, loss of good conduct badges, leave, or pay, or short periods of imprisonment. Many were also given suspended sentences of between 60 and 66 days imprisonment. The sailors from Tasman and Hautapu were all charged with mutiny, with the sailors from the minesweeper also charged with desertion, and were all imprisoned for 60 days, although this was later commuted to sentences of between 14 and 24 days.

The 52 Bellona sailors who did not return by the Naval Board deadline were marked as having deserted, even though naval regulations meant that they had to be absent for seven days before being considered deserters. Once marked, the sailors lost all arrears of pay and allowances. Between the date of the mutiny and 23 June, when Bellona sailed to the Bay of Islands on her next deployment, another 32 men returned, with 11 senior sailors and 9 junior sailors still absent. Various charges were laid against the sailors depending on the severity of their actions during the mutiny, ranging from "negligently performing their duty in not preserving order", to "wilfully disobeying a legal command", to "joining a mutiny not accompanied by violence". The sailors were sentenced to periods of imprisonment up to 92 days, with some personnel demoted or stripped of good conduct badges. Of the 20 who failed to return, some were tracked down and arrested, while others gave themselves up to authorities, one sailor was at large for over two years before his arrest, detention, and dismissal.

The size, scope, and long-term impact of the mutiny have been downplayed. There was no mention of the events in the official history published in 1991 to commemorate the RNZN's 50th anniversary.
