= Richard Washbourn =

British and New Zealand naval officer (1910–1988)

Rear-Admiral Richard Washbourn CB DSO OBE
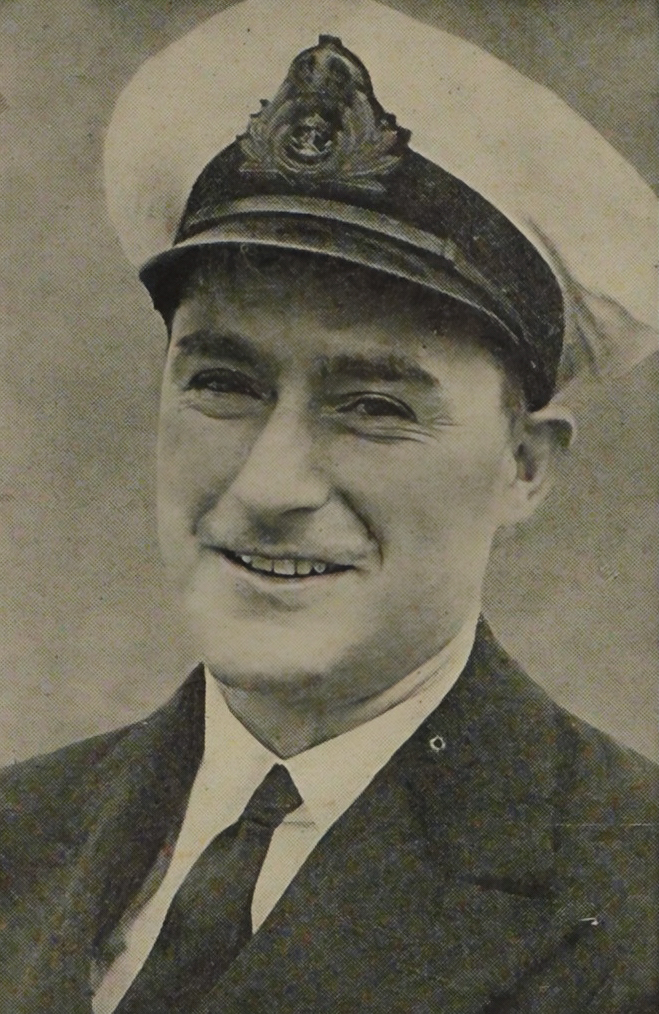
- Washbourn during World War II
- Born: 14 February 1910; Sumner, New Zealand
- Died: 8 August 1988 (aged 78); Onekaka, New Zealand
- Spouse: June Herapath (m. 1943)
- Relatives: Enga Washbourn (sister)
- Military career
- Allegiance: United Kingdom / New Zealand
- Branch: Royal Navy; Royal New Zealand Navy
- Service years: 1928–1965
- Rank: Rear-Admiral
- Commands: HMS Manxman; HMS Tiger; Chief of Naval Staff
- Conflicts: World War II; Battle of the River Plate

Rear-Admiral Richard Everley Washbourn CB DSO OBE (14 February 1910 – 8 August 1988) was a senior officer of the Royal Navy and the Royal New Zealand Navy (RNZN) from the 1940s to the 1960s. He served as the New Zealand Chief of Naval Staff between 1963 and 1965.

== Early life ==
Born in Sumner, New Zealand, on 14 February 1910, Washbourn was the son of Henry Everley Arthur Washbourn and Sydney Laing Washbourn (née Sinclair). His oldest sister was the artist Enga Washbourn. He was educated at Nelson College from 1919 to 1927. As a 13-year-old, he rescued a man from drowning in the Maitai River.

Washbourn joined the Royal Navy as a special entry cadet in January 1928 after leaving school, serving for the next eight years in HMS Erebus, HMS London, HMS Warspite and HMS Diomede. In 1933, he won the Goodenough Medal for gunnery, and he also received the Robert Megaw Memorial Prize for 1932–1933, awarded to the sub-lieutenant achieving the highest marks in the examinations for lieutenant. From 1936 to 1937, he became a gunnery specialist, and won the Commander Egerton Memorial Prize in 1937 for the gunnery lieutenant achieving the best examination in practical gunnery. He was posted to HMS Excellent in 1938 and HMS Achilles the following year.

== Second World War ==
Washbourn served with the Royal Navy and then Royal New Zealand Navy during the Second World War. He was appointed a Companion of the Distinguished Service Order (DSO) in 1940 for his actions while serving in HMS Achilles during the Battle of the River Plate. His citation read:

Lieutenant Richard E. Washbourn, ... who, when early in the action several splinters struck the Gun Director Tower, at once killing three men and wounding two others inside the tower, though wounded on the head by a splinter which half stunned him and killed the man behind him, continued to control the main armament with the utmost coolness. He set a magnificent example to the rest of the Director Tower crew, who all stood to their posts and made light of the incident. Thus the Primary Control kept working and secured throughout the action a high rate of hits on the enemy.

Washbourn remained with Achilles until 1942, when he returned to HMS Excellent. He transferred to HMS Anson in 1943. On 27 March 1943, he married June Beatrice Medwin Herapath at St Mary Abbots in Kensington, London, and the couple went on to have two children. Washbourn spent the last two years of World War II at the Admiralty Gunnery Establishment.

== Postwar career ==
From 1946 to 1948, Washbourn served as executive officer on HMNZS Bellona, and in the 1950 New Zealand New Year Honours, he was appointed an Officer of the Order of the British Empire. He was commander superintendent of Devonport Naval Base in Auckland in 1950, deputy director of Naval Ordnance from 1951 to 1952, and commanded HMS Manxman in 1953. He served as chief staff officer to Flag Officer (Flotillas) in the Mediterranean during 1954 and 1955, and then was Director of Naval Ordnance from 1956 to 1958. He commanded HMS Tiger in 1959, and served as Director-General of Weapons for the Admiralty between 1960 and 1962. In the 1961 British New Year Honours, Washbourn was appointed a Companion of the Order of the Bath.

After retiring from the Royal Navy in 1962, Washbourn returned to New Zealand and joined the RNZN, serving as Chief of Naval Staff from 1963 to 1965.

== Later life ==
In 1964, Washbourn purchased the bell of HMS Chevron from the Rosyth Dockyard for £8, and donated it to Collingwood District High School the following year. In his retirement, he developed Alzheimer’s disease. He died in the Golden Bay settlement of Onekaka on 8 August 1988. His wife, June Washbourn, died in 1993.

Military offices
Preceded by Rear Admiral Peter Phipps	Chief of Naval Staff; 1963–1965	Succeeded by Rear Admiral John Ross
