= Maritime Component Commander (New Zealand) =

The Maritime Component Commander (MCC) is the officer of Commodore rank who directs all the operational forces of the Royal New Zealand Navy. The current postholder is Captain D.G. McEwan, appointed 1 March 2018. MCC directs all the ships of the Navy and several subordinate captains and commanders, most resident several hundred kilometres to the north at Devonport Naval Base in Auckland.

From 1940 the title of the post was Naval Officer-in-Charge, Auckland, and from 1 January 1961 the Commodore, Auckland ("COMAUCK"). The first ComAuck was Commodore F.D.G. Challis RN; in that rank, Challis was present at Waitangi Day, at Waitangi, in 1963 during Queen Elizabeth II's Royal Tour of New Zealand. Among the Commodores Auckland was Commodore J O'C Ross, who later wrote The White Ensign in New Zealand, and later Rear Admirals and Chiefs of Naval Staff John McKenzie Lincoln Tempero, and Somerford Teagle.

According to RNZN Bridge Cards, Captain I.A. Hunter commanded HMNZS Southland (F104) from December 1983 to December 1984 (and later became ComAuck). When New Zealand's four Leander-class frigates made up the 11th Frigate Squadron (in tandem with the Royal Navy's frigate squadrons) the ship’s commander of that squadron was a Captain and referred to as “F11”. The 11th Frigate Squadron was under the command of the Commodore Auckland. Other officers who served as Captain F11 were Ian Bradley; later ComAuck Commodore Richard Hale; and later Rear-Admiral Edward Thorne.

The last ComAuck was Commodore K.R. Moen, appointed 14 March 1992. The ComAuck title changed to the Maritime Commander in March 1993.

The title was changed to Maritime Component Commander as of 1 July 2001, with the establishment of Headquarters Joint Forces New Zealand and the move of the incumbent from Devonport Naval Base in Auckland to HQ JFNZ, on Seddul Bahr Road in Upper Hutt facing Trentham Military Camp.

== In Command ==
- Commander Frederic C. Bradley RN, appointed 30 January, 1925 - Naval Officer in Charge, Auckland
- Commander Nelson Clover RN, appointed 17 July, 1928 - NOIC Auckland
- Commander Edward Lyon Berthon RN, 2 January, 1931
- Commander Basil C. B. Brooke RN, appointed 10 November, 1933
- Commander Charles B. Tinley RN, appointed 27 April 1936
- Captain Hugh Merriman Barnes, appointed 21 October, 1938, handover 14 October, 1940, as Captain in Charge, Auckland
- Commander Douglas A. Bingley, appointed 14 October, 1940, Naval Officer in Charge, Auckland
- Commodore, First Class, Eustace Rotherham, RN, appointed 27 January, 1941 – 21 June, 1943
- Commodore, First Class, William K. D. Dowding RN, appointed 21 June 1943 – 7 January, 1946
- Acting Captain Douglas A. Bingley RN, appointed 7 January, 1946 – 19 June, 1946
- Captain Charles R. V. Pugh, appointed 19 June 1946 – 5 June, 1948
- Captain Auberon C. A. C. Duckworth, RN, 5 June, 1948 – 8 October, 1950
- Captain Arthur E. T. Christie, RN, 8 October, 1950 – 9 October, 1952
- Captain Maurice L. Hardie, RN, 9 October, 1952 – 9 November, 1954
- Captain Terence D. Herrick RN appt 9 November, 1954 - 5 November, 1956
- Captain (later Commodore) George R. Davis-Goff, R.N.Z.N., 5 November, 1956 – 14 May, 1959. Promoted while in post to Commodore, 1957.
- Commodore, R.N.Z.N. Leo Bourke, 14 May, 1959 – 19 April, 1960
- Commodore, R.N.Z.N. John O'Connell Ross, 19 April, 1960 – 11 September, 1962 (as Commodore, Auckland from 1 January, 1961)
- Commodore, First Class Frederick D. G. Challis, 11 September, 1962 – 10 June, 1964 (henceforth as Commodore, Auckland)
- Commodore, First Class Richard E. Roe, 10 June, 1964 – 1 March, 1966
- Commodore, R.N.Z.N. Lawrence G. Carr, 1 March, 1966 – 23 August, 1968
- Commodore, R.N.Z.N. J. P. S. Vallant, 23 August, 1968 – ?
