= George Davis-Goff =

George Raymond Davis-Goff
- Born: 24 September 1905; Renwicktown, New Zealand
- Died: 30 May 1987 (aged 81); Auckland, New Zealand
- Military career
- Allegiance: New Zealand
- Branch: Royal New Zealand Navy
- Rank: Commodore
- Conflicts: Second World War: Battle of the River Plate; Battle of Kolombangara; Korean War
- Awards: Commander of the Order of the British Empire; Distinguished Service Cross and bar Mentioned in despatches

Commodore George Raymond Davis-Goff CBE DSC* (24 September 1905 – 30 May 1987) was a senior officer in the Royal New Zealand Navy (RNZN).

Born in 1905, he joined the precursor to the RNZN, the New Zealand Division of the Royal Navy as a boy seaman in 1921. By 1941, he had been commissioned as an officer, the first New Zealander to be promoted from the ranks in the Royal Navy. He was awarded the Distinguished Service Cross for his services during the latter stages of the Second World War, where he served aboard firstly HMNZS Leander and then HMNZS Gambia in the Pacific. He later commanded a RNZN frigate during the Korean War. He finished his military career in 1959 with the rank of commodore. He died in 1987 as a result of an accident at his home in Auckland.

== Early life ==
Born in Renwicktown in the Marlborough Region of New Zealand on 24 September 1905, Davis-Goff was the son of a labourer, William Francis Davis-Goff, and his wife, Emily née Assesen, who was of Swedish extraction. When Davis-Goff was ten years old, the family moved to Masterton where he attended Lansdowne School. He went onto Masterton District High School. He finished his schooling in 1919 and went into the printing trade.

== Naval career ==
In August 1921, Davis-Goff joined the New Zealand Division of the Royal Navy as a boy seaman. He received his initial training on the training vessel HMS Philomel, which was moored at the Devonport Naval Base in Auckland. He was then posted to HMS Chatham in May 1922 as a boy first class. Promoted to able seaman the following year, he was sent to the United Kingdom for further training on torpedoes. Based at the shore establishment HMS Vernon, he undertook formal study to obtain qualifications to improve his prospects of advancement in the navy alongside his regular training.

Returning to New Zealand, Davis-Goff was posted to HMS Diomede which had just been commissioned into the New Zealand Division of the Royal Navy. He received a further promotion to acting leading seaman in 1927 and the next year, he sailed with the ship to Samoa where he helped suppress a non-violent uprising by the Mau movement. A further spell in the United Kingdom for further specialised training followed and once completed he rejoined Diomede, which was undergoing a refit at the time. He was promoted to the rank of petty officer in 1931 and once more was the recipient of specialist training in the United Kingdom.

Continuing to serve on Diomede, he was the first sailor in the New Zealand Division to attain the rank of torpedo gunner. In 1935, he was awarded the King George V Silver Jubilee Medal. He served in the Abyssinia Crisis, when Diomede was diverted to the Middle East in case it was required to take offensive operations against Italy. During this period, Davis-Goff became dissatisfied with his career but his attempts to resign from the Royal Navy were rebuffed. When Diomede was transferred to the naval reserve in 1936, Davis-Goff was posted to her replacement, HMS Achilles.

=== Second World War ===
Davis-Goff was involved in the first naval battle of the Second World War, the Battle of the River Plate, which took place on 13 December 1939, serving aboard Achilles as the warrant officer overseeing the ship's torpedo tubes. He was mentioned in despatches for his conduct in the battle looking after the depth charges despite being exposed to gunfire from the German cruiser Admiral Graf Spee. In 1941 he was made acting lieutenant, having received further training in England to facilitate his promotion which was made substantive a few months later. He was the first New Zealander to progress from being a boy seaman to a commissioned rank.

A brief period of service with the Royal Navy followed during which Davis-Goff served on an arctic convoy to Russia. In June 1942 he was posted to HMNZS Leander, a cruiser of the Royal New Zealand Navy (RNZN), (Note: The New Zealand Division of the Royal Navy became known as the Royal New Zealand Navy in September 1941.) which was part of the Mediterranean Fleet at the time but was soon sent to the Pacific. He participated in the Battle of Kolombangara, which took place in July 1943 in the Solomon Islands. During this engagement Leander was damaged. She went to the United States for a prolonged period to undergo repairs and refit, and Davis-Goff went with her. He was promoted to lieutenant commander in August 1944.

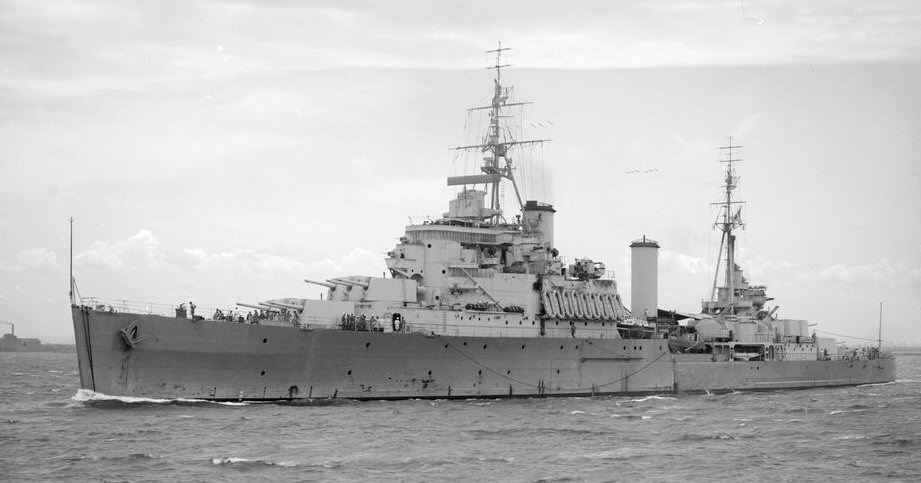
Davis-Goff served on HMNZS Gambia in 1945

In early 1945, Davis-Goff was posted to HMNZS Gambia, at the time operating in the Pacific as part of the British Fourth Cruiser Squadron. It spent some time in Australia in mid-1945 undergoing a refit before sailing to Japan to rejoin the squadron there. At the end of the war, with Gambia off Tokyo Bay, Japan, he went ashore with two platoons of seamen and some Royal Marines to receive the surrender of the Yokosuka naval base. For his service in the latter part of the war he received the Distinguished Service Cross (DSC).

=== Postwar career ===
In the immediate postwar period, Davis-Goff performed shore duties in Auckland from 1946 with the rank of acting commander (which was made substantive the next year). He went to England in 1950 for training in staff duties and also served a spell with the Royal Navy on an exchange programme, which ended in 1951. He then served as executive officer on HMNZS Bellona for a year before being given command of HMNZS Hawea.

Hawea was one of two RNZN frigates serving off the coast of Korea at the time as part of New Zealand's contributions to the United Nations commitments to the Korean War. Under Davis-Goff's command, Hawea conducted coastal patrols and provided naval gunfire support to land operations. When Hawea's tour in Korea ended in late 1953, it returned to New Zealand. He was promoted to captain, the first New Zealander in the RNZN to enlist as a seaman and proceed to attain this rank. He also received a bar to his DSC for his Korean War service. In 1953, he was awarded the Queen Elizabeth II Coronation Medal.

Davis-Goff was then given a posting to Melbourne, in Australia, as head of the New Zealand Joint Services Liaison Staff. He remained here for almost three years and then returned to Auckland to take up the post of Naval Officer in Charge, Auckland, on 5 November 1956. In 1957, he was promoted to commodore. The next year he was made a Commander of the Order of the British Empire. He retired from the Royal New Zealand Navy on 13 May 1959, after 37 years of service.

== Later life ==
Davis-Goff lived in Australia in the early years of his retirement before moving back to New Zealand and settling in the Auckland suburb of Onehunga. On 30 May 1987, he was taken to hospital after an accident at home. He died later that day, survived by his second wife.

== Notes ==
Footnotes

Citations
