= Devonport Dockyard =

Devonport Dockyard may refer to:

- HMNB Devonport, Devonport, Devon, England, one of the main bases of the Royal Navy in the United Kingdom
- Devonport Naval Base, Devonport, New Zealand, the main base of the Royal New Zealand Navy
