= Enga Washbourn =

New Zealand artist, painter, writer and model (1908–1988)

Enga Margaret Washbourn (1 March 1908 – 8 July 1988) was a New Zealand artist and writer. She was born in Collingwood, New Zealand, in 1908. Richard Washbourn was her younger brother.

== Selected work ==
- Washbourn, Enga (1970). Courage and Camp Ovens: Five generations at Golden Bay. Reed Publishing. ISBN 0-589-00429-8. Wikidata Q125100587.
