= Chief of Navy (New Zealand) =

Commander of the Royal New Zealand Navy

- Naval Ensign of New Zealand

- Incumbent; Garin Golding since 27 August 2024
- New Zealand Defence Force
- Abbreviation: CN
- Member of: Navy Leadership Board
- Reports to: Chief of Defence Force
- Term length: Three years (renewable)
- Formation: 1 October 1941
- First holder: Commodore Edward Parry
- Deputy: Deputy Chief of Navy
- Website: Official website

Chief of Navy (CN) commands the Royal New Zealand Navy (RNZN) and is responsible to the Chief of Defence Force (CDF) for raising, training, and sustaining those forces necessary to meet agreed government outputs. The CN acts as principal advisor to the CDF on Navy matters, and is the most senior appointment in the RNZN. The rank associated with the position is rear admiral, and CNs are generally appointed on a three-year term.

The position was originally created as Chief of Naval Staff and First Naval Member upon the formation of the RNZN on 1 October 1941. A number of the officers who became CNS served as Commodore, Auckland (later named Maritime Component Commander) before taking the helm of the Navy. The title changed to Chief of Naval Staff in 1970, and CN in 2003. Rear Admiral Garin Golding assumed the post on 27 August 2024.

== Appointees ==
The following list chronologically records those who have held the post of Chief of Navy or its preceding positions, with rank and honours as at the completion of the individual's term.

No.	Portrait	Name	Took office	Left office	Time in office
Chief of Naval Staff and First Naval Member
1	Edward Parry CB	Commodore; Edward Parry CB (1893–1972); RN	1 October 1941	June 1942	8 months
2	Sir Atwell Lake, 9th Baronet CB, OBE	Commodore; Sir Atwell Lake, 9th Baronet CB, OBE (1891–1972); RN	June 1942	12 July 1945	3 years, 1 month
3	George Haines Faulkner DSC	Commodore; George Haines Faulkner DSC (1893–1983); RN	13 July 1945	May 1947	1 year, 9 months
4	George Simpson CB, CBE	Commodore; George Simpson CB, CBE; RN	July 1947	June 1950	3 years, 1 month
5	F.A. Balance DSO	Commodore; F.A. Balance DSO; RN	June 1950	April 1953	2 years, 10 months
6	Sir Charles Madden, 2nd Baronet CB	Commodore; Sir Charles Madden, 2nd Baronet CB (1906–2001); RN	April 1953	May 1955	2 years, 1 month
7	John McBeath CB, DSO, DSC	Rear Admiral; John McBeath CB, DSO, DSC; RN	May 1955	February 1958	2 years, 9 months
8	Michael Villiers OBE	Rear Admiral; Michael Villiers OBE (1907–1990); RN	February 1958	March 1960	2 years, 1 month
9	Peter Phipps KBE, DSC & Bar, VRD	Rear Admiral; Peter Phipps KBE, DSC & Bar, VRD (1909–1989) (Note: was subsequently promoted to vice admiral and appointed Chief of Defence Force.)	April 1960	June 1963	3 years, 3 months
10	Richard Washbourn CB, DSO, OBE	Rear Admiral; Richard Washbourn CB, DSO, OBE; RN/RNZN	June 1963	October 1965	2 years, 4 months
11	John Ross CB, CBE	Rear Admiral; John Ross CB, CBE	October 1965	June 1969	3 years, 8 months
12	Lawrence Carr DSC	Rear Admiral; Lawrence Carr DSC	July 1969	May 1970	10 months
Chief of Naval Staff
1	Lawrence Carr CB, DSC	Rear Admiral; Lawrence Carr CB, DSC	June 1970	June 1972	2 years, 1 month
2	Edward Thorne CB, CBE	Rear Admiral; Edward Thorne CB, CBE (1923–2013)	July 1972	December 1975	3 years, 6 months
3	John McKenzie CB, CBE	Rear Admiral; John McKenzie CB, CBE	December 1975	December 1977	2 years
4	Neil Anderson CB, CBE	Rear Admiral; Neil Anderson CB, CBE (1927–2010)	December 1977	April 1980	2 years, 4 months
5	Keith Saull CB	Rear Admiral; Keith Saull CB	April 1980	April 1983	3 years
6	Cedric Steward CB	Rear Admiral; Cedric Steward CB	April 1983	February 1986	2 years, 10 months
7	Lincoln Tempero CB	Rear Admiral; Lincoln Tempero CB	February 1986	May 1987	1 year, 3 months
8	Douglas Domett CB, CBE	Rear Admiral; Douglas Domett CB, CBE	May 1987	May 1989	2 years
9	Somerford Teagle	Rear Admiral; Somerford Teagle	May 1989	March 1991	1 year, 10 months
10	Ian Hunter CB	Rear Admiral; Ian Hunter CB (1939–2022)	March 1991	April 1994	3 years, 1 month
11	Jack Welch CB	Rear Admiral; Jack Welch CB	April 1994	7 April 1997	3 years
12	Fred Wilson CBE, LVO	Rear Admiral; Fred Wilson CBE, LVO	8 April 1997	April 2000	2 years, 11 months
13	Peter McHaffie OBE	Rear Admiral; Peter McHaffie OBE	April 2000	April 2003	3 years
Chief of Navy
1	Peter McHaffie CNZM, OBE	Rear Admiral; Peter McHaffie CNZM, OBE	April 2003	7 April 2004	1 year
2	David Ledson ONZM	Rear Admiral; David Ledson ONZM (born 1951)	8 April 2004	April 2009	4 years, 11 months
3	Tony Parr ONZM, MVO	Rear Admiral; Tony Parr ONZM, MVO (born 1955)	April 2009	29 November 2012	3 years, 7 months
4	Jack Steer ONZM	Rear Admiral; Jack Steer ONZM	30 November 2012	30 November 2015	3 years
5	John Martin ONZM	Rear Admiral; John Martin ONZM	30 November 2015	29 November 2018	2 years, 11 months
6	David Proctor	Rear Admiral; David Proctor	29 November 2018	16 May 2024	5 years, 5 months
7	Garin Golding	Rear Admiral; Garin Golding	27 August 2024	Present	2 years, 1 month
