= Ian Hunter (admiral) =

New Zealand naval commander (1939–2022)

Ian Hunter CB
- Born: 23 October 1939; Dunedin, New Zealand
- Died: 8 December 2022 (aged 83); Waikanae, New Zealand
- Military career
- Allegiance: New Zealand
- Branch: Royal New Zealand Navy
- Rank: Rear Admiral
- Commands: HMNZS Waikato; HMNZS Southland; Chief of Naval Staff (1991–1994)

Rear Admiral Ian Alexander Hunter CB (23 October 1939 – 8 December 2022) was an officer of the Royal New Zealand Navy, who served as Chief of Naval Staff from March 1991 to April 1994.

== Biography ==
Born in Dunedin on 23 October 1939, Hunter was educated at Christchurch Boys' High School. He joined the navy as a midshipman in 1957, and trained at the Britannia Royal Naval College, Dartmouth. He served in various Royal Navy submarines and New Zealand naval ships, and in exchange postings with the Royal Navy on shore and at sea. He qualified as a submarine watch officer, an anti-submarine warfare specialist, and a naval diver. During the summer of 1962–1963 he was in the Antarctic and then served in HMNZS Rotoiti as navigating and communications officer.

In 1965, Hunter married Hilary Rankin Sturrock, and the couple went on to have two sons.

From 1965 to 1966, Hunter was a member of the instructional staff at the joint Royal Navy / Royal Air Force Anti-Submarine School, and was the Royal Navy's diving officer and bomb and mine disposal officer for Northern Ireland. He later served as the executive officer on HMNZS Blackpool as the leased ship was returned to the Royal Navy, and was the first operations officer on HMNZS Canterbury following her commissioning in 1971.

In 1976, Hunter was promoted to the rank of commander. In 1979, he gained command of HMNZS Waikato, and then was the first commander of HMNZS Southland from 1982. Promoted to the rank of commodore in 1987, Hunter was appointed assistant chief of defence staff (development plans). The following year, he became commodore Auckland (marine commander, New Zealand), and in 1989 he was appointed an additional aide-de-camp to Queen Elizabeth II.

Hunter was promoted to rear admiral and appointed Chief of Naval Staff with effect from 29 March 1991. He served in that role until retiring on 8 April 1994.

Following his retirement from the navy, Hunter was a trustee of the Wellington Civic Trust, serving as chair from 1996 to 1999, and then deputy chair until 2004. Between 1994 and 2001, he was a trustee of the Wellington Museums Trust. Hunter was patron of the Wellington branch of the Royal New Zealand Returned and Services' Association.

Hunter died in Waikanae on 8 December 2022, aged 83.

== Honours and awards ==
In 1990, Hunter received the New Zealand 1990 Commemoration Medal. In the 1993 Queen's Birthday Honours, he was appointed a Companion of the Order of the Bath.

Military offices
Preceded by Rear Admiral Somerford Teagle	Chief of Naval Staff; 1991–1994	Succeeded by Rear Admiral Jack Welch
