= Somerford Teagle =

Retired senior officer of the Royal New Zealand Navy

Sir Somerford Teagle
- Born: 9 June 1938 (age 88); Lower Hutt, New Zealand
- Military career
- Allegiance: New Zealand
- Branch: Royal New Zealand Navy
- Rank: Vice Admiral
- Service number: K15856
- Commands: Chief of Defence Force (1991–95); Chief of Naval Staff (1989–91)
- Awards: Knight Commander of the Order of the British Empire

Vice Admiral Sir Somerford Francis Teagle KBE (born 9 June 1938) is a retired senior officer of the Royal New Zealand Navy (RNZN).

Teagle was born in Lower Hutt on 9 June 1938. His parents were Leonard Herbert Teagle and Muriel Frances Teagle (née Rooney). He was educated at Wellesley College in Wellington, Christ's College in Christchurch, Britannia Royal Naval College in Dartmouth, the Joint Services Staff College in Canberra, and the Canadian National Defence College.

Teagle served as Chief of Naval Staff, the professional head of the RNZN, from 1989 to 1991, and in New Zealand's most senior military post as Chief of Defence Force from 1991 until his retirement in 1995. He is notable for having ended the rum ration in the RNZN, with effect from March 1990.

In 1977, Teagle received the Queen Elizabeth II Silver Jubilee Medal, and in 1990 he was awarded the New Zealand 1990 Commemoration Medal. In the 1994 Queen's Birthday Honours, he was appointed a Knight Commander of the Order of the British Empire.

Military offices
Preceded by Lieutenant General Sir John Mace	Chief of Defence Force; 1991–1995	Succeeded by Lieutenant General Anthony Birks
Preceded by Rear Admiral Douglas Domett	Chief of Naval Staff; 1989–1991	Succeeded by Rear Admiral Ian Hunter
