= Edward Thorne (naval officer) =

Former Royal News Zealand Navy Officer

- Born: 29 October 1923; Seatoun, New Zealand
- Died: 23 October 2013 (aged 89); Auckland, New Zealand
- Military career
- Allegiance: New Zealand
- Branch: Royal New Zealand Navy
- Service years: 1942–75
- Rank: Rear Admiral
- Commands: Chief of Naval Staff; HMNZS Waikato; HMNZS Otago; HMNZS Pukaki; HMNZS Irirangi
- Conflicts: Second World War; Indonesia–Malaysia confrontation
- Awards: Companion of the Order of the Bath; Commander of the Order of the British Empire
- Other work: Commissioner of the New Zealand Fire Service

Rear Admiral Edward Courtney "Ted" Thorne, CB, CBE (29 October 1923 – 23 October 2013) was a senior Royal New Zealand Navy officer. He rose to be Chief of Naval Staff and later served as the Commissioner of the New Zealand Fire Service.

== Biography ==
Thorne was born in Seatoun, Wellington, on 29 October 1923 and was educated at Rongotai College from 1935 to 1938, followed by Nelson College from 1938 to 1941. After leaving school, he travelled to England, becoming a cadet at Dartmouth. His training included time in the cruiser Hawkins and during the war he served in vessels including the heavy cruiser Devonshire and the destroyer Lamerton.

Following the Second World War, Thorne spent time with the Royal Navy 2nd Minesweeping Squadron and returning to New Zealand he served in Taupo, Bellona and Kaniere. He was in command of the naval radio station at Waiouru on Christmas Eve 1953 when news of the nearby Tangiwai disaster came through, and he led naval personnel in the ensuing recovery operation. In 1972 he was promoted to rear admiral and was appointed New Zealand's Chief of Naval Staff. Following his retirement from the navy, he was appointed the first commissioner of the New Zealand Fire Service.

He died in Auckland on 23 October 2013.

== Honours and decorations ==
In 1953, Thorne was awarded the Queen Elizabeth II Coronation Medal. In the 1972 New Year Honours, he was appointed a Commander of the Order of the British Empire. Thorne was appointed a Companion of the Order of the Bath in the 1975 Queen's Birthday Honours.

Military offices
Preceded by Rear Admiral Lawrence Carr	Chief of Naval Staff; 1972–1975	Succeeded by Rear Admiral John McKenzie
