= Devonport Defence Health Centre =

- Royal New Zealand Navy
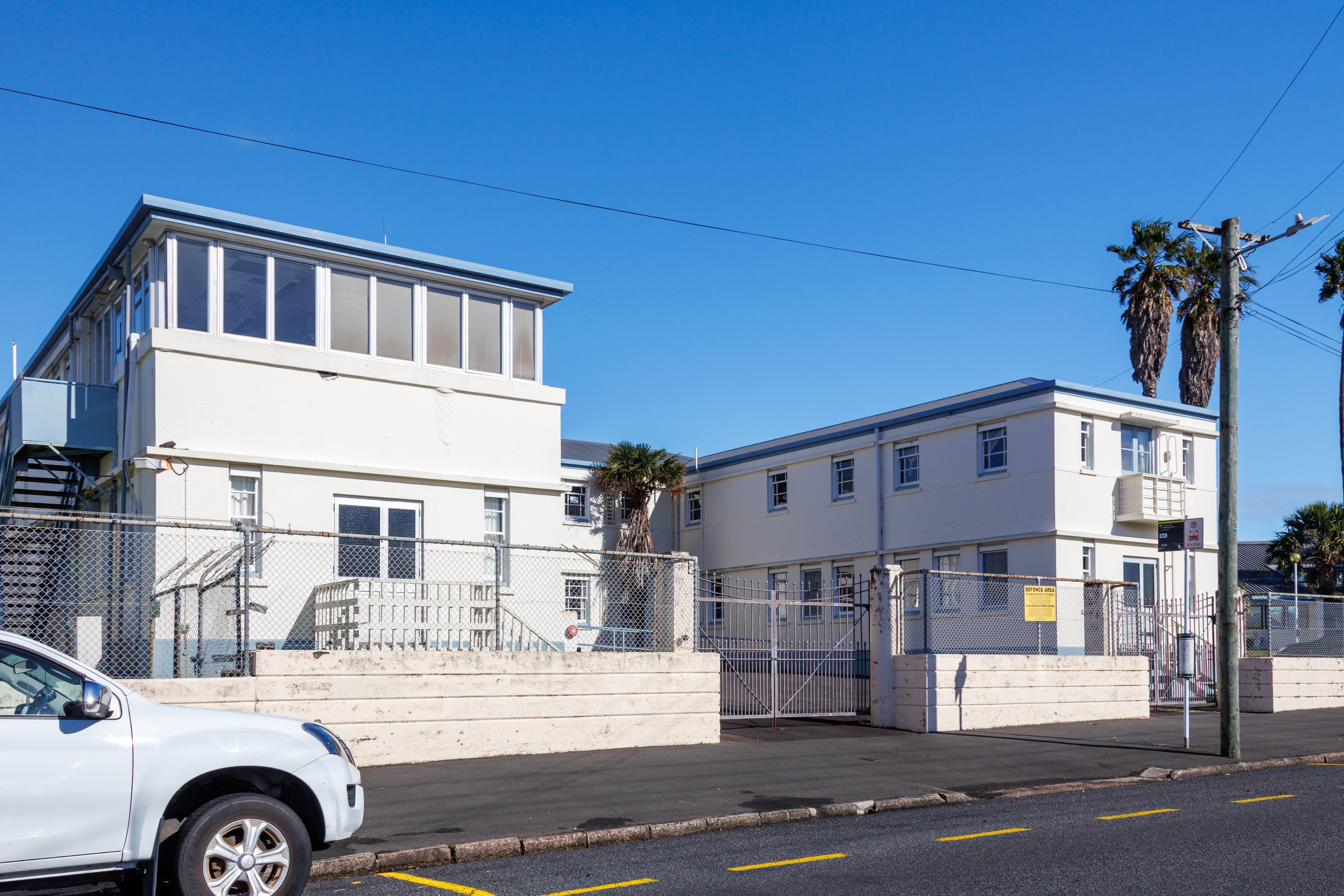
- The health centre on Calliope Road

Geography
- Location: Devonport Naval Base, Auckland, New Zealand
- Coordinates: 36.828895°S 174.787342°E

Links
- Lists: Hospitals in New Zealand

The Devonport Defence Health Centre (previously known as the Navy Hospital, Royal New Zealand Navy Hospital (RNZNH) and Naval Health Unit) is the healthcare facility of the New Zealand Navy. It is located in Devonport, on Devonport Naval Base in Auckland.

== History ==
Founded in 1941 (before, 'sick quarters' facilities had been restricted to two wooden huts), the hospital was constructed (and still remains) on the cliff overlooking the naval base. The hospital expanded in the early 1980s with a new wing, and started hiring civilian staff in the 1990s. As of 2008, the hospital was treating military personnel only, and was operating as an accredited part of the New Zealand health system.

== Facilities ==
=== Hyperbaric Unit ===
The Hyperbaric Unit is now owned and operated by WDHB - Health New Zealand - and is New Zealand's leader in diving and hyperbaric medical training and expertise, as well as having the only North Island facility to treat diving related emergencies, such as decompression sickness ('the bends'). The 'Slark' Hyperbaric Unit is used for both emergency treatment and non-urgent Hyperbaric Oxygen Therapy (HBOT) for general medical needs, including use by the public. Although still currently located adjacent to the Defence Health Centre at Devonport Naval Base, the unit is no longer part of the naval medical facility.
