= HMS Royalist (89) =

British/New Zealand Cruiser

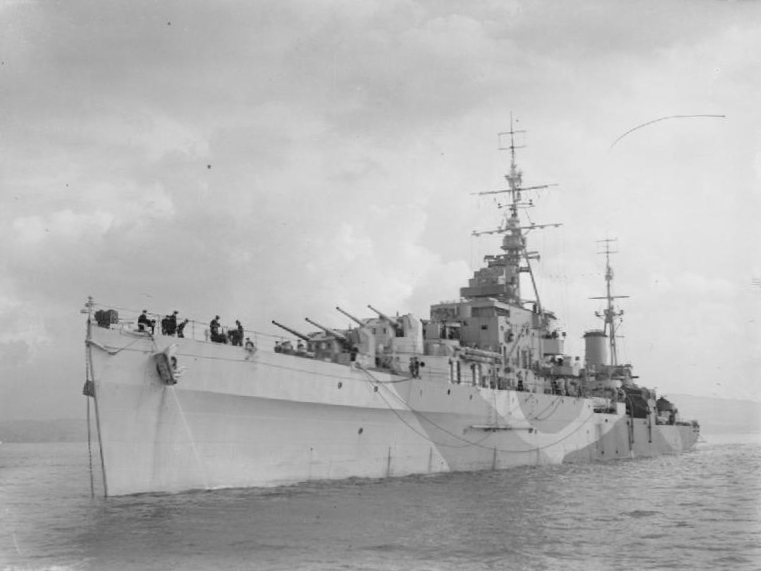
- Royalist anchored at Greenock, Scotland, in September 1943

History

United Kingdom
- Name: Royalist
- Builder: Scotts Shipbuilding and Engineering Company, Greenock
- Laid down: 21 March 1940
- Launched: 30 May 1942
- Commissioned: 10 September 1943
- Recommissioned: 1967
- Decommissioned: November 1967
- Out of service: In reserve from 1946 to 1956 Loaned to the Royal New Zealand Navy from 1956 to 1966
- Identification: Pennant number: 89
- Fate: Sold for scrap, November 1967

New Zealand
- Name: HMNZS Royalist
- Commissioned: 1956
- Decommissioned: 1966
- Out of service: Returned to Royal Navy control 1967

General characteristics (as built)
- Class & type: Dido-class light cruiser
- Displacement: 5,950 tons standard; 7,200 tons full load
- Length: 485 ft (148 m) pp; 512 ft (156 m) oa
- Beam: 50 ft 6 in (15.39 m)
- Draught: 14 ft (4.3 m)
- Installed power: 62,000 shp (46 MW)
- Propulsion: 4 geared steam turbines; Four shafts; Four Admiralty 3-drum boilers
- Speed: 32.25 knots (59.73 km/h; 37.11 mph)
- Range: 1,303 nmi (2,414 km) at 30 kn (56 km/h); 3,685 nmi (6,824 km) at 16 kn (30 km/h)
- Complement: 530
- Armament: 8 × QF 5.25-inch (133 mm) guns, 6 × dual 20 mm Oerlikon AA guns, 3 × quadruple 2-pounder (40 mm) "pom-pom", 2 × triple 21-inch (530 mm) torpedo tubes
- Armour: Belt: 3 in (76 mm), Deck: 1 in (25 mm), Magazines: 2 in (51 mm); Bulkheads: 1 in (25 mm)

HMS Royalist was a Bellona-class (improved Dido-class) light cruiser of the Royal Navy (RN) and Royal New Zealand Navy (RNZN) during the Second World War and early Cold War.

After her commissioning in 1943, Royalist was modified with extra facilities and crew for operating as a flagship in aircraft carrier operations. Initially, she operated in the North Sea before transferring to the Mediterranean for the invasion of southern France. Royalist remained in the Aegean Sea until the end of 1944 before sailing to the Far East in 1945 where the ship served until the end of the war.

Royalist was then put into reserve until 1953, when the Navy decided to proceed with plans to refit the ship. The high cost of reconstruction and new governmental policy forced the RN to transfer the vessel to the Royal New Zealand Navy (RNZN) in 1956. In return, New Zealand covered the reconstruction costs of Royalist. After ten years of service with the RNZN, which included involvement in the Suez Crisis and the Indonesia–Malaysia confrontation, she was scrapped in 1967.

== Development ==
=== Design ===
In 1943, the Royal Navy (RN) intended to use the Bellona-class as flagships in escort carrier/cruiser groups during the Invasions of France as well as during joint Royal Navy-US Navy operations in the Pacific. Within months of her commissioning, Royalist's design diverged from the rest of her class. She was fitted with two extra rooms that further enabled her to communicate with aircraft carriers and Fleet Air Arm aircraft. In addition, she was modified with the incorporation of one of the first implementations of an "Action Information Office" (AIO). The AIO was an early operations room, in which computers and manual plotting allowed a force to be managed efficiently. The AIO allowed her to operate as a command ship in the northern Atlantic, primarily in hunting German warships Tirpitz and Scharnhorst. The specialized equipment pushed crew members to their limits, as only minimal space remained for sleeping and comfort. Compared to her base design requiring a crew of 484, Royalist's complement was 600, adding to the aforementioned problems of cramped conditions. All together, Royalist was designated as a 'Carrier Flagship' when she was mounted with radar.

=== Construction ===
Royalist was built by Scotts Shipbuilding and Engineering Company of Greenock who laid her keel on 21 March 1940. She was launched on 30 May 1942, and commissioned on 10 September 1943. She returned to the dockyard for alterations in November which were not complete until February 1944. Her French motto, Surtout Loyal, translates to "Loyal above all".

== Royal Navy career ==
=== North Atlantic service ===
Following her commissioning, Royalist spent several months working up, in which she underwent repairs for trial defects and for further alterations and additions. These included aforementioned modifications for service as a carrier flagship. In March 1944, Royalist joined the Home Fleet and served for a short period in the Arctic theater. In this capacity, she was flagship of Operation Tungsten, the carrier raid in April 1944 against the German battleship Tirpitz in a Norwegian fjord.

After Tungsten, Royalist escorted carriers for attacks on shipping off Norway before entering dock for a refit. After completion of the work in June, Royalist was ordered to the Mediterranean to support the Operation Dragoon landings in the south of France in August 1944. Royalist was the flagship (Rear Admiral Thomas Hope Troubridge) of the RN/USN Task Force 88 that was tasked with maintaining air superiority over the beaches and the support of landing operations.

=== Mediterranean service ===
Following the Dragoon landings, Royalist joined the Aegean Force, tasked with preventing enemy evacuation from the islands in the Aegean Sea. On 15 September, Royalist and destroyer HMS Teazer sank transports KT4 and KT26 off Cape Spatha. She was stationed in the Aegean until late 1944 before a refit in early 1945 at Alexandria. After her stint in the Mediterranean, she was transferred to the East Indies and joined the East Indies Fleet.

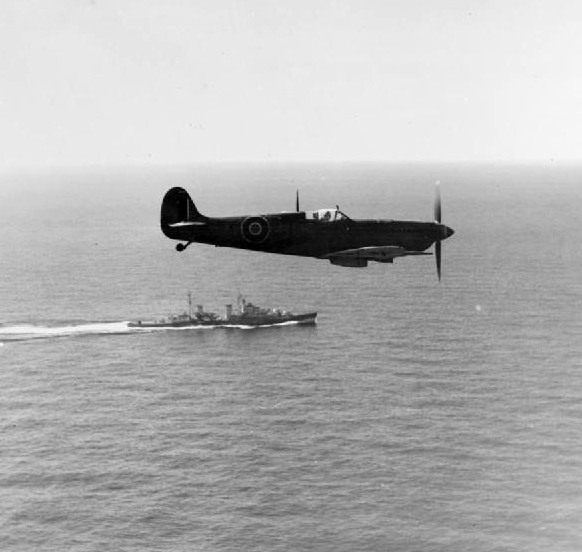
Royalist and a Supermarine Seafire off Alexandria, 1945

By April 1945, she was flagship of the 21st Aircraft Carrier Squadron, supporting the Rangoon landings of Operation Dracula.

From 10 May, Royalist joined a group of carriers during Operation Mitre, which searched for Japanese warships evacuating Nicobar and the Andaman Islands. For the remainder of the war, she supported carrier raids against targets in the East Indies and Sumatra.

Scottish author Alistair MacLean served on Royalist during the war, and used his experiences as background for his acclaimed first novel HMS Ulysses (1955) as well as for some of his subsequent works.

== Post-war reconstruction ==
Royalist was withdrawn from the East Indies after the end of the war and returned home to be mothballed and dehumidified in 1946.

Concerned about the growth and threat of the Soviet Navy, the Admiralty board ordered a modernisation of four Dido-class cruisers in 1950. (Note: the other three were HMS Diadem, Sirius and Cleopatra) Royalist was planned to be the first of four to six Dido/Bellona-class cruisers to be modernised under the program, with work planned to start in January 1953. The ships were chosen as they were modern, economical, and could be easily modified with new radars and fire control systems. The importance of the refits increased when other attempts to do the same to Colony and Swiftsure-class cruisers were cancelled.

The modernisation required the construction of a new superstructure and the addition of a fire control system, with the work planned to only extend the cruiser's lifespan by 6 years. In March 1953, reconstruction of Royalist began.

Following the Conservative victory in the general election of 1951, attitude towards the RN changed. Newly re-elected Prime Minister Winston Churchill supported the Royal Air Force at the cost of the navy and its budget was cut in 1952. The shift in policy undermined naval expansions by the outgoing Attlee government and the Navy was forced to cancel upgrades of many ships. Under these financial cuts, plans to refurbish Royalist and her sister ships were postponed by three years. In 1954, a review of the Royal Navy found that the cruiser conversions lacked "dual war and peace, [and] cold war capabilities required" for the Navy, and the program was further deprioritised.

== Transfer to Royal New Zealand Navy ==
In 1955, the RN was looking to offload the half-renovated and obsolete Royalist. The offer was accepted by New Zealand Prime Minister Sid Holland, who offered that his nation would pay for the rest of her reconstruction.

Royalist's transfer occurred when the Royal New Zealand Navy (RNZN) was at a crossroads about its future. Internal factions within the RNZN and New Zealand government disagreed regarding the roles and doctrine of its Navy, with many unsure how a nuclear-era force should function and the importance of anti-submarine frigates. Royalist's refurbishment cost of £4.5 million indicated the position of the Navy, as the RNZN chose to refurbish the cruiser rather than build two frigates with the same funds.

Those in favour of a new cruiser believed a ship like Royalist would be able to serve an anti-aircraft role in supporting allied operations in the Pacific, alongside the RN and Royal Australian Navy. Royalist was faster, more armed, and had better range then the Whitby-class frigates proposed to be bought instead. Furthermore, concern about Soviet cruisers raiding shipping in the South Pacific gave her the edge over the primarily ASW ships.

New Zealand only covered her reconstruction costs and did not out-right buy the ship. This was due to the RN only 'loaning' the vessel as the RNZN was not seen as being an independent force within the British Empire. When her modifications were complete, New Zealand refused to accept the vessel stating that the poor World War II-era sleeping arrangements and lack of ABC equipment were unsatisfactory. This soured relations between the two navies as the RN did not appreciate perceived refusal from a subordinate.

The ship was handed over to the Royal New Zealand Navy on 9 July 1956 following the completion of the work. Controversy over her purchase (and governmental stance) persisted, with the ship being viewed as either a white elephant or the most modern and capable vessel of the RNZN.

As part of the Kiwi half of her refurbishment, Royalist was fitted with a new radar, fire control system, and three 'STAAG 2' 40 millimeter anti-air guns.

== Royal New Zealand Navy career ==
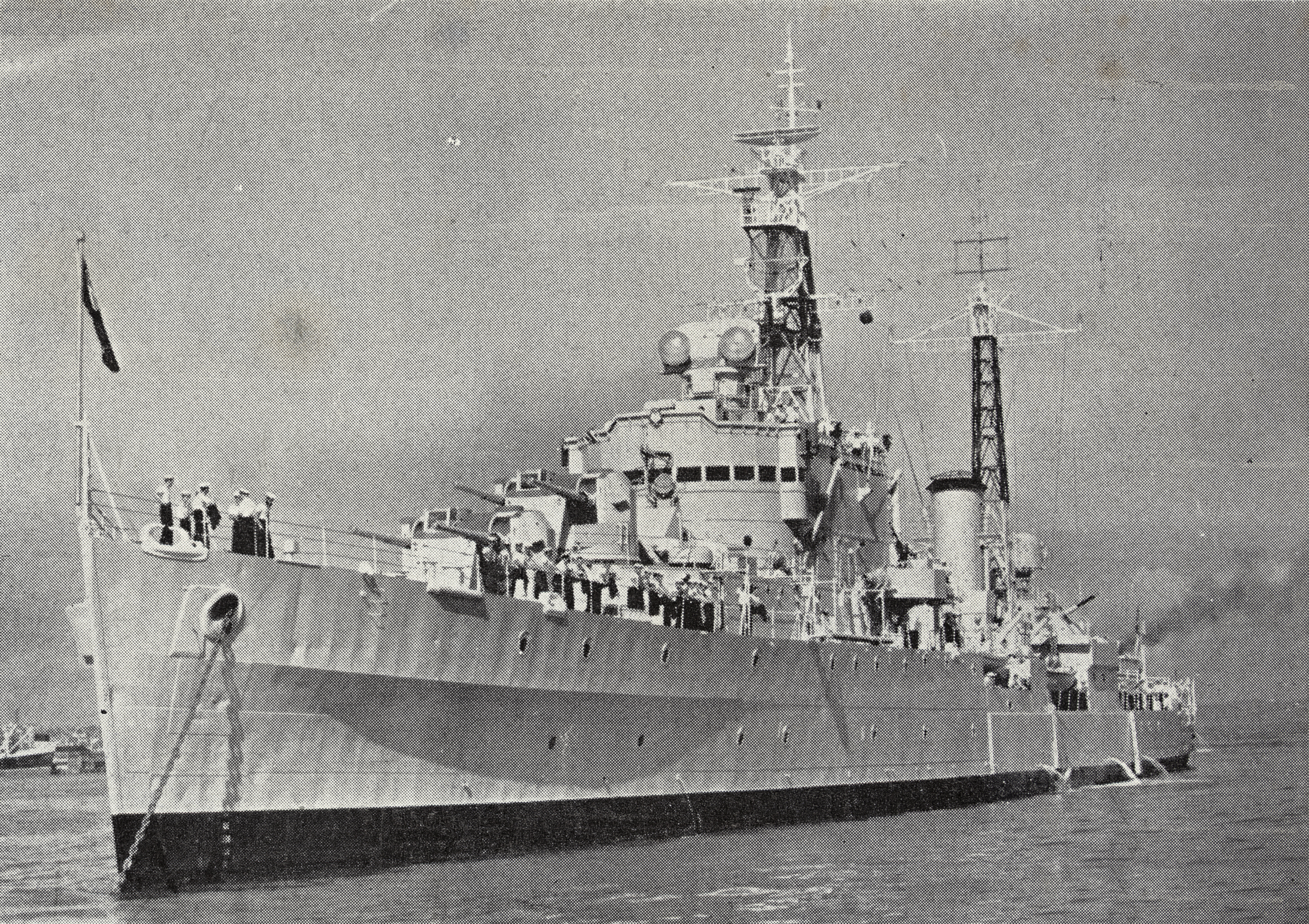
HMNZS Royalist during the Suez Crisis

=== Suez Crisis ===
After working up in British waters, Royalist was assigned to the British fleet in the Mediterranean. In August 1956, New Zealand Prime Minister Sidney Holland was persuaded by British Prime Minister Anthony Eden to keep her in the Mediterranean as a deterrent to Egyptian or Israeli aggression. Despite not operating her, the RN wanted to keep the cruiser on station due to her anti-air capabilities and the threat of hostile aircraft. Following diplomatic negotiations between the two respective governments, the New Zealand Cabinet agreed not to recall the cruiser under the condition that she did not participate in combat.

Following British attacks on Egypt as part of Operation Musketeer (1956), Commonwealth support for the operations faltered. New Zealand soon became concerned about harming its relations with the UK by not supporting the plan and harming its relations with other global powers if it did. Following several days of posturing in Auckland, Holland decided to order Royalist to withdraw from operations.

As New Zealand figured out the nation's stance on the crisis, the cruiser operated with the RN fleet as an air defence radar picket, rescue ship for downed pilots, and as a method to coordinate British aircraft on bombing runs. Later on during the crisis, the New Zealand Cabinet met again to discuss Royalist. Due to the cruiser forming an important part of the RN's anti-air defence in the area, and not wanting to harm relations further, the cabinet "decided not to decide" on her presence within the RN fleet. As such, she remained with the Royal Navy fleet yet did not participate further in Operation Musketeer.

=== Pacific service ===
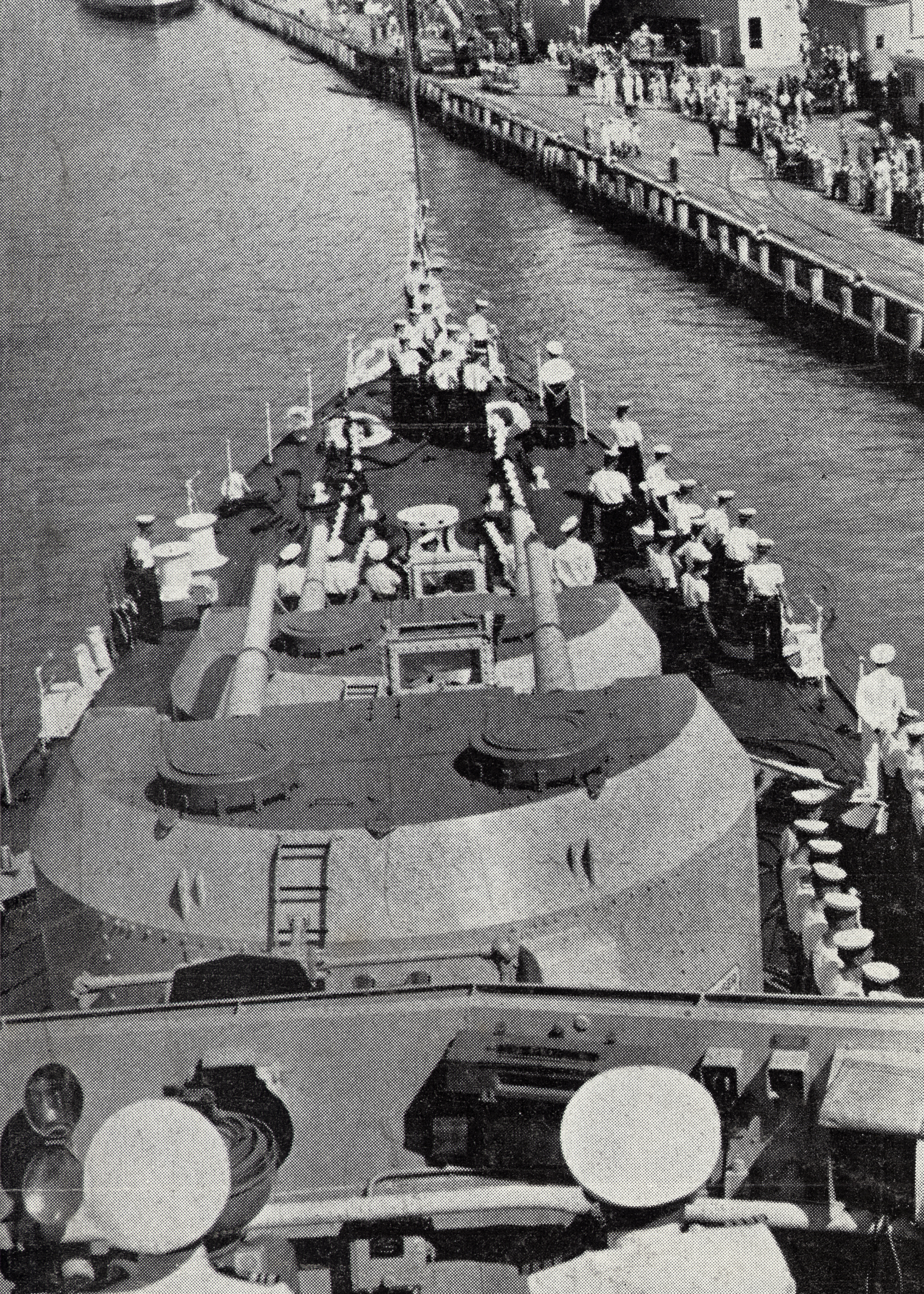
HMNZS Royalist at Devonport Naval Base, 1956

Royalist continued to operate with allied navies in the 1950s, and her anti-air capabilities were proven when she outperformed RN cruisers during exercises. As part of New Zealand involvement in the Malayan Emergency, she was used to repeatedly shell the MNLA in Johore.

By 1960, the cruiser was expected to serve another two and a half years and the Navy began searching for a replacement. At the time, the RN was short of loanable cruisers, so the frigate HMS Blackpool (F77) was transferred to cover the decommissioning of both Royalist and the recently sunk HMAS Voyager.

In 1962, while sailing in rough weather in the Tasman Sea, the cruiser's keel twisted out of alignment. It was found that her captain ran the ship at excess speed into a head sea in an attempt to make it back to land to watch a Rugby match between the Wallabies and All Blacks.

Between 1963 and 1965, she operated with the British Far East Fleet during the Indonesia–Malaysia Confrontation. She joined British vessels in making provocative passages between Indonesian Islands in an attempt to deter Indonesian attacks on Malaysia. During these deployments, her age began to show as captains described unserviceable equipment, structural degradation, and below-deck overheating; by now, the ship was already beyond her lifespan and overdue for retirement.

Many in the RNZN doubted that the ageing ship could deploy again. Despite these concerns, she spent two months being refitted to allow her to rejoin the overstretched Far East Fleet in 1965. Following this work, it was estimated that the ship's steam turbines could be kept operational for 15 more months. For her last ever deployment, she was ordered to Pearl Harbor for further maintenance before being sent to Hong Kong and Singapore to relieve the British fleet. Once in Singapore, she conducted anti-infiltration patrols, boarded boats, deployed shore patrols, served as a simulated "enemy Sverdlov cruiser" in exercises, and provided air defence for HMS Bulwark off Borneo.

While returning to New Zealand, a boiler and turbine broke down, cancelling a Waitangi Day tour of the country and ending her career five months early.

== Decommissioning and fate ==
Royalist was paid off on 4 June 1966 and, after eleven years in the RNZN, reverted to Royal Navy control in 1967. She was sold for scrap to the Nissho Company of Japan in November 1967. She was then towed from Auckland to Osaka on 31 December 1967 and scrapped upon arrival.

== Bibliography ==
- Brown, D.K. (1995). Major Surface Vessels. The Design and Construction of British Warships, 1939–1945. The official record. London: Conway Maritime Press. ISBN 9780851776736.
- Campbell, N.J.M. (1980). "Great Britain". In Chesneau, Roger (ed.). Conway's All the World's Fighting Ships 1922–1946. New York: Mayflower Books. pp. 2–85. ISBN 0-8317-0303-2.
- Colledge, J. J.; Warlow, Ben (2006) [1969]. Ships of the Royal Navy: The Complete Record of All Fighting Ships of the Royal Navy from the 15th Century to the Present (3rd Rev ed.). London: Chatham Publishing. ISBN 978-1-86176-281-8. OCLC 67375475.
- Friedman, Norman (2010). British Cruisers: Two World Wars and After. Barnsley, UK: Seaforth Publishing. ISBN 978-1-59114-078-8.
- Friedman, Norman (2006). British Destroyers & Frigates: The Second World War and After.
- Grove, Eric (2006) [2004]. Royal Navy since 1815. A Short History. London: Palgrave-MacMillan. ISBN 9780333721254.
- Helgason, Guðmundur (2018). "HMS Royalist (89)". uboat.net.
- Hobbs, D (2015). The British Carrier Strike Fleet after 1945. Barnsley: Seaforth.
- Hodges, Peter; Friedman, Norman (2003) [1979], Destroyer Weapons of World War 2, London: Conway
- Kyle, Keith (1991). Suez. London: Weidenfeld and Nicolson. ISBN 9780297812746 – via archive.org.
- Mason, Lt Cdr Geoffrey B RN (Rtd) (2004). Smith, Gordon (ed.). "HMS Royalist – Bellona-class AA Cruiser". Service Histories of Royal Navy Warships in World War 2. naval-history.net.
- McGibbon, Ian, ed. (1999). Unofficial Channels: Letters between Alister McIntosh and Foss Shanahan, George Laking and Frank Corner 1946–1966. Wellington: Victoria University Press. ISBN 978-0-86473-365-8.
- Mountbatten, Louis (1979). Zeigler, Philip (ed.). Shore to Shore. The Diaries of Earl Mountbatten of Burma 1953–1979. London: Collins. ISBN 9780002176064 – via Archive.org.
- Pugsley, Christopher (2003). From Emergency to Confrontation. New Zealand Armed Forces 1949–66. Melbourne: Oxford University Press. ISBN 9780195584530.
- Raven, Alan; Lenton, H. Trevor (1973). Dido cruisers. Ensign 2. London: Bivouac Books. ISBN 9780856800030.
- Raven, Alan; Roberts, John (1980). British Cruisers of World War Two. Annapolis, Maryland: Naval Institute Press. ISBN 0-87021-922-7.
- Roberts, John (2009). Safeguarding the Nation: the Story of the Royal Navy. Havertown: Seaforth. ISBN 9781783830305.
- Rohwer, Jürgen (2005). Chronology of the War at Sea 1939–1945: The Naval History of World War Two (Third Revised ed.). Annapolis, Maryland: Naval Institute Press. ISBN 1-59114-119-2.
- Russell, Mike. "HMS Royalist (C89)". WWII cruisers.
- Seldon, A. (1981). Churchill's Indian Summer. The Conservative Government 1951-55. London: Hodder & Stoughton.
- Templeton, Malcolm (1994). Ties of Blood and Empire: New Zealand's Involvement in Middle East Defence and the Suez Crisis 1947–57. Auckland NZ: Auckland University Press. ISBN 978-1-86940-097-2.
- Twiss, Frank; Bailey, Chris Howard (1996). Social Change in the Royal Navy 1924–1970. The Life and Times of Admiral Frank Twiss. Stroud: Sutton. ISBN 9780750906104.
- Walters, Conrad (2019). British Town class cruisers. Barnsley: Seaforth. ISBN 9781526718853.
- Whitley, M. J. (1995). Cruisers of World War Two: An International Encyclopedia. London: Cassell. ISBN 1-86019-874-0.
- Mason, Lt Cdr Geoffrey B (5 June 2011). "HMS Royalist - Bellona-class AA Cruiser including Convoy Escort Movements". Service Histories of Royal Navy Warships in World War 2 – via navalhistory.net.
