= HMS Bellona (63) =

Cruiser of the Royal Navy

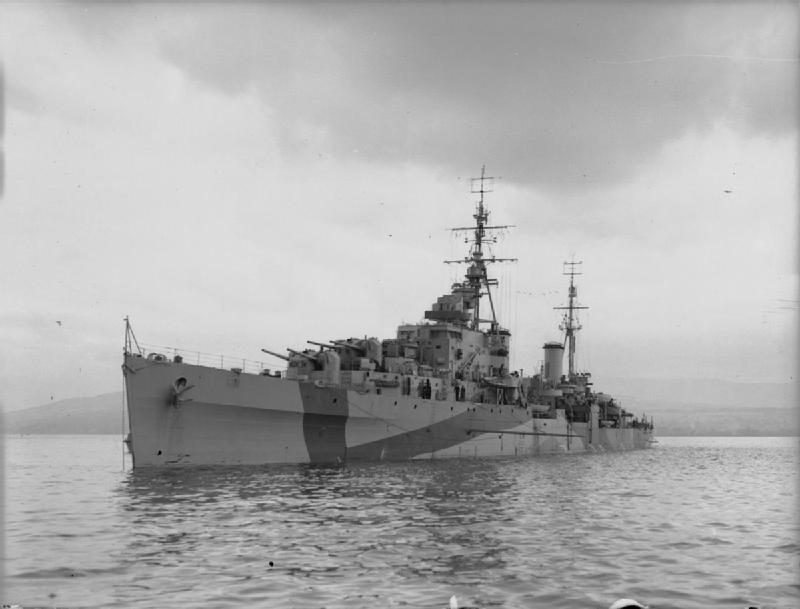
- Bellona moored in October 1943

History

United Kingdom
- Name: HMS Bellona
- Namesake: Bellona, Roman goddess of war
- Builder: Fairfield Shipbuilding and Engineering Company Govan
- Laid down: 30 November 1939
- Launched: 29 September 1942
- Commissioned: 29 October 1943
- Decommissioned: June 1957
- Out of service: Loaned to the Royal New Zealand Navy, 17 April 1946
- Reclassified: In reserve between 1956 and 1957
- Identification: Pennant number 63
- Motto: 'Battle is our Business'
- Fate: Scrapped, Arrived at the Briton Ferry yard of Thos. W. Ward, (Barrow-in-Furness, UK) on 5 February 1959

New Zealand
- Name: HMNZS Bellona
- Commissioned: 17 April 1946
- Fate: Returned to Royal Navy control in April 1956

General characteristics
- Class & type: Dido-class light cruiser
- Displacement: 5,950 tons standard; 7,200 tons full load
- Length: 485 ft (148 m) pp; 512 ft (156 m) oa
- Beam: 50.5 ft (15.4 m)
- Draught: 14 ft (4.3 m)
- Propulsion: Parsons geared turbines; Four shafts; Four Admiralty 3-drum boilers; 62,000 shp (46 MW)
- Speed: 32.25 knots (60 km/h)
- Range: 1,500 nmi (2,800 km) at 30 kn (56 km/h); 4,240 nmi (7,850 km) at 16 kn (30 km/h); 1,100 tons fuel oil
- Complement: 530
- Armament: Original configuration: 8 × QF 5.25-inch (133 mm) guns, 6 × dual 20 mm AA guns, 3 × quadruple 2-pounder (40 mm) "pom-poms", 2 × 21-inch (530 mm) triple torpedo tubes; Early 1943 - early 1945 configuration: 8 × 5.25 in (133 mm) guns, 6 × 20 mm dual AA guns, 12 × 20 mm single AA guns, 3 × quadruple 2-pdr (40 mm) pom-poms, 2 × 21 in (533 mm) triple torpedo tubes.; 1954; 8 x 5.25 in (133 mm) guns, 6 x single 40mm Bofors electric, Mk3P AA guns; 6 x 20mm Oerlikon Mk7A
- Armor: Original configuration: Belt: 3 in (76 mm), Deck: 1 in (25 mm), Magazines: 2 in (51 mm), Bulkheads: 1 in (25 mm).

HMS Bellona was the name ship of her sub-class of light cruisers for the Royal Navy. She was the first of the fourth group of Dido-class cruisers. Built to a modified design ("Improved Dido") with only four twin 5.25-inch turrets, but with remote power control for quicker elevation and training, combined with improved handling and storage of the ammunition. The light AA was improved over earlier Dido cruisers, with six twin 20mm Oerlikons and three quadruple 40mm "pom pom".

Entering service in late 1943, the cruiser operated during World War II as an escort for the Arctic convoys, and as a jamming ship to prevent the use of radio-controlled bombs and in support of the Omaha Beach landings.

In 1946 the cruiser was loaned to the Royal New Zealand Navy. Although not involved in the 1947 Royal New Zealand Navy mutinies, at the start of the month, 140 sailors elected to not return to the ship in protest at the poor pay and working conditions and how their colleagues had been treated. Fifty-two sailors were eventually marked as deserters while the others were charged with various lesser offences.

Bellona was returned to the Royal Navy in 1956. She did not re-enter service and was scrapped two years later.

== Construction ==
She was built by Fairfield Shipbuilding and Engineering Company (Govan, Scotland), with the keel being laid down on 30 November 1939. She was launched on 29 September 1942 and commissioned on 29 October 1943. All of the Bellona class used the High Angle Control System (HACS) and they were all fitted with Remote Power Control, allowing the HACS to remotely control their 5.25-inch (133 mm) guns.

Bellona was named after the Roman goddess of war. Her motto was 'Battle is our Business'.

== Operational history ==
=== Royal Navy ===
Bellona participated in several Arctic convoys supplying the USSR, both before and after the invasion of France. She took over the Channel patrol at the start of 1944 as a replacement for the cruiser Charybdis, which had been sunk off the Channel Islands by torpedo boats in the Battle of Sept-Îles. On arrival at Plymouth, Bellona was fitted with equipment for jamming the radio signals that controlled bombs. Bellona and seven destroyers were involved, including Tartar. The codename for the patrol force was 'Snow White and the seven dwarfs'.

During the day the force anchored in Plymouth Sound, as air defence for Plymouth. At dusk, under cover of darkness and maintaining radio and radar silence, the force would proceed at full speed to the French coast to keep the German Narvik-class destroyers bottled up in Brest. The force would return to Plymouth by daylight. By day the RAF would patrol the Channel and by night, Plymouth.

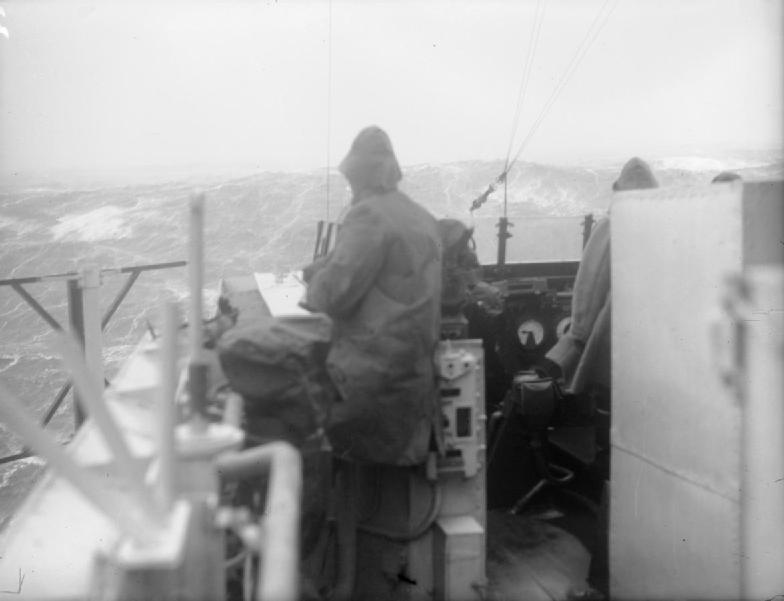
A Force 12 plus gale was blowing when this picture was taken from the bridge as HMS Bellona plunged through mountainous seas on a convoy to Russia. Note the huge wave in front of the ship

On 6 June Bellona's duty was to help to support Omaha Beach, in the American sector, where she was placed along with US battleships USS Texas and USS Arkansas under the command of Rear admiral Carleton F. Bryant. As the army advanced, Bellona fired her guns inshore at targets spotted by aircraft and forward observation officers off-shore. On several occasions Bellona returned to Plymouth to get more ammunition and change her gun barrels because of wear. At night Bellona went close inshore to provide supporting fire.

In July 1944 Bellona covered the carrier raids against the German battleship Tirpitz but the following month was back in the Channel, attacking German convoy traffic in the Bay of Biscay and off the Brittany coast.

Bellona returned to northern waters for the remainder of the war, sailing on Arctic convoys and accompanying carrier and cruiser sweeps along the Norwegian coastline before arriving in Copenhagen in time for the German surrender in May 1945.

After the war she was part of the 10th Cruiser Squadron until 1946 when she was loaned to the Royal New Zealand Navy.

=== Royal New Zealand Navy ===
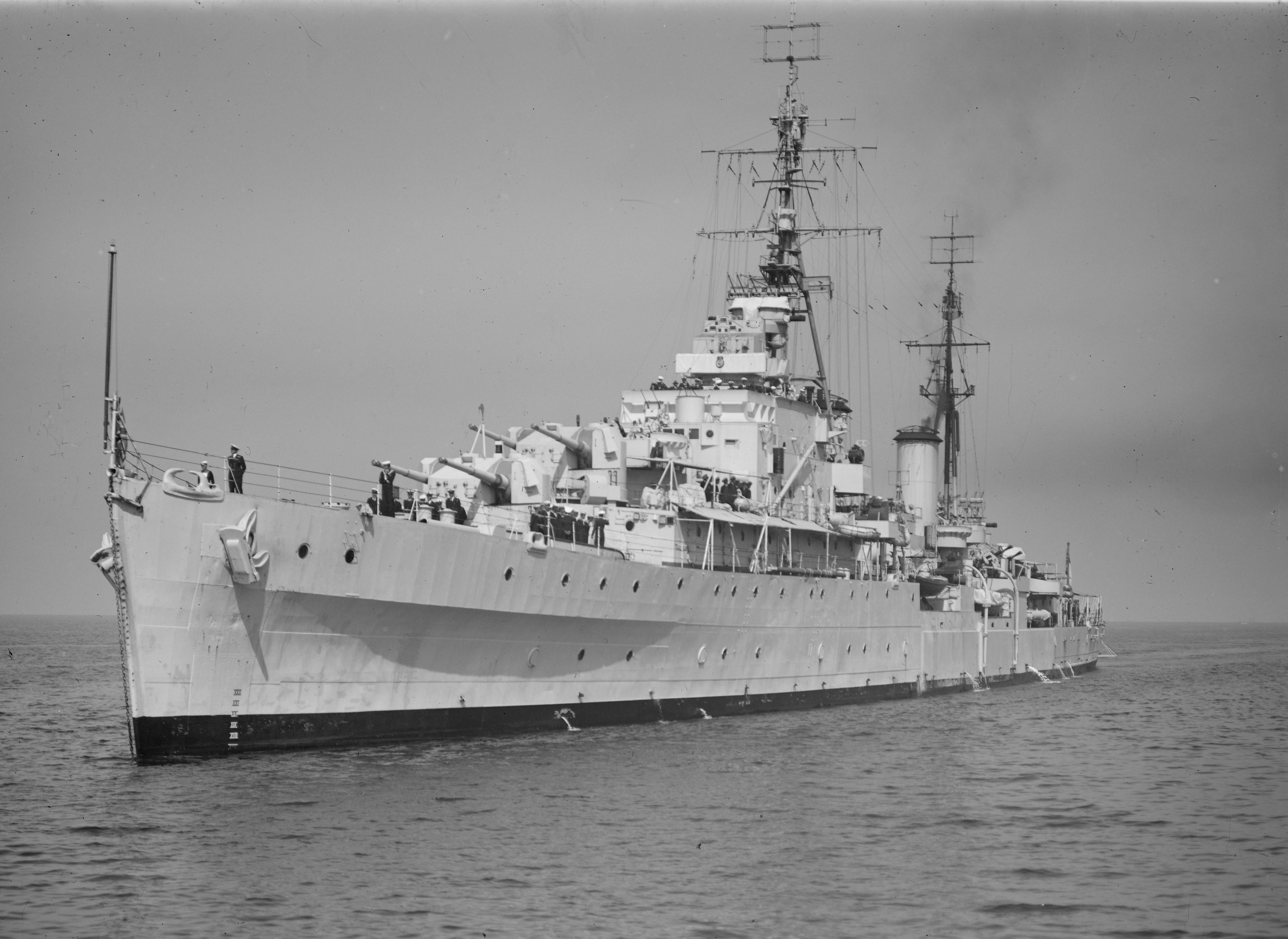
Bellona in 1947

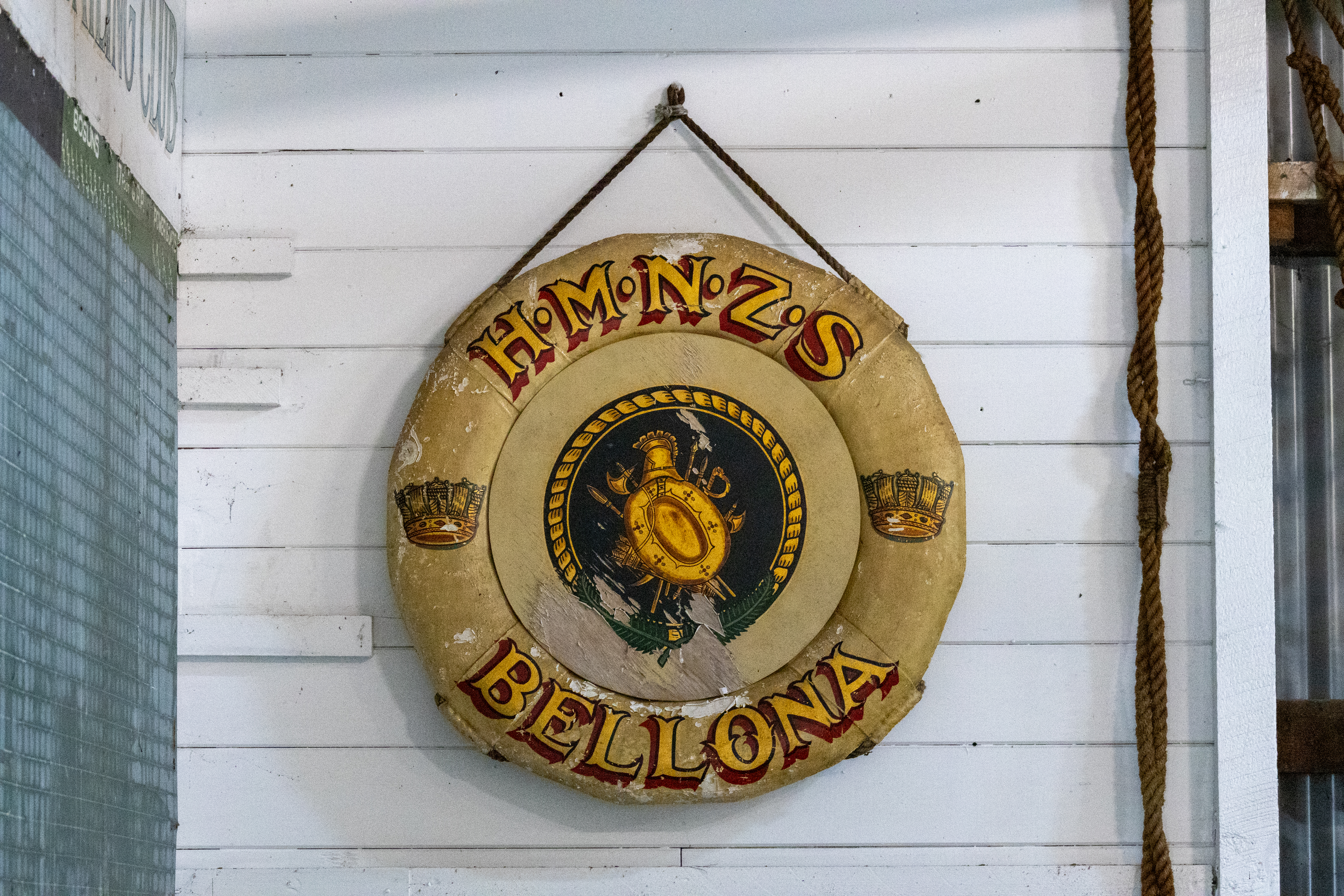
New Zealand insignia of Bellona, Torpedo Bay Navy Museum, Auckland

During March and April 1947 Bellona was involved in training exercises with the Royal Australian Navy. During gunnery practice a sailor, Gordon Patten, was injured and was sent to hospital for treatment where he remained for months. The cruiser returned to Devonport Naval Base in Auckland in late April and the crew were given a day's leave to attend Anzac Day services and events on Friday, 25 April. Although the ship had missed the main mutiny at the start of the month, personnel from Bellona were concerned about how their colleagues had been treated and during the afternoon, about 100 sailors assembled in Quay Street, Auckland and decided not to return to duty. They compiled a list of three demands—that naval pay rates be increased to match the New Zealand Army and Royal New Zealand Air Force; that committees tasked with improving the welfare of the lower ranks be established; and that the sailors involved in the previous mutiny not be persecuted or punished. Another 40 sailors mustering before boarding Bellona were recruited into the mutiny. In response, Bellona's captain sent the entire complement on leave for the weekend.

On Monday 28 April, a letter listing the mutineers demands was presented to the captain with the intention that it be forwarded to the Naval Board. Instead of addressing the complaints, the New Zealand Naval Board declared that any sailor who did not return to duty by the morning of Tuesday 29 April would be marked as Absent Without Leave. By morning parade 52 men had failed to return. Those sailors were marked as having deserted even though naval regulations meant that they had to be absent for seven days before being considered deserters. Once marked, the sailors lost all unpaid pay and allowances. The issuing of arrest warrants for the sailors was also considered, but the cruiser's captain dismissed the suggestion. Between the date of the mutiny and 23 June, when Bellona sailed on her next deployment, another 32 men returned. Various charges were laid against them, ranging from "wilfully disobeying a legal command" to "joining a mutiny not accompanied by violence" and the sailors were sentenced to periods of imprisonment up to 92 days.

In 1951 the cruiser was taking part in a multinational exercise in Australian waters. During the exercise a Hawker Sea Fury from the Australian aircraft carrier HMAS Sydney accidentally fired four practice rockets into the superstructure of the New Zealand ship. Only minor damage was caused and although an inquiry concluded that the pilot had unintentionally pressed the fire button, it was later found that certain signal frequencies transmitted by Sydney’s radios could trigger the aircraft's weapon-firing circuits. By 1952 a limited attempt at modernisation was being undertaken, with the twin Oerlikons being replaced with land Mk 3 single Bofors, which were upgraded with electric power into the RNZN unique Toadstool CIWS, also refitted to HMNZS Black Prince and intended to be controlled by six STD directors which the Government was reluctant to approve with the uncertain future of the cruiser. It was intended to refit the multiple pom pom mounts to both cruisers, and they were installed for the return voyage to the UK as the RN judged Toadstool as non-standard and not as good as the RN's new electric 40mm mounts.

Bellona reverted to Royal Navy control after the transfer of the cruiser Royalist in 1956.

== Fate ==
On 5 February 1959, she arrived at the Briton Ferry yard of Thos. W. Ward to be broken up.
