= HMNZS Philomel =

Royal New Zealand Navy naval base in Auckland

Coordinates: 36°49′46″S 174°47′03″E

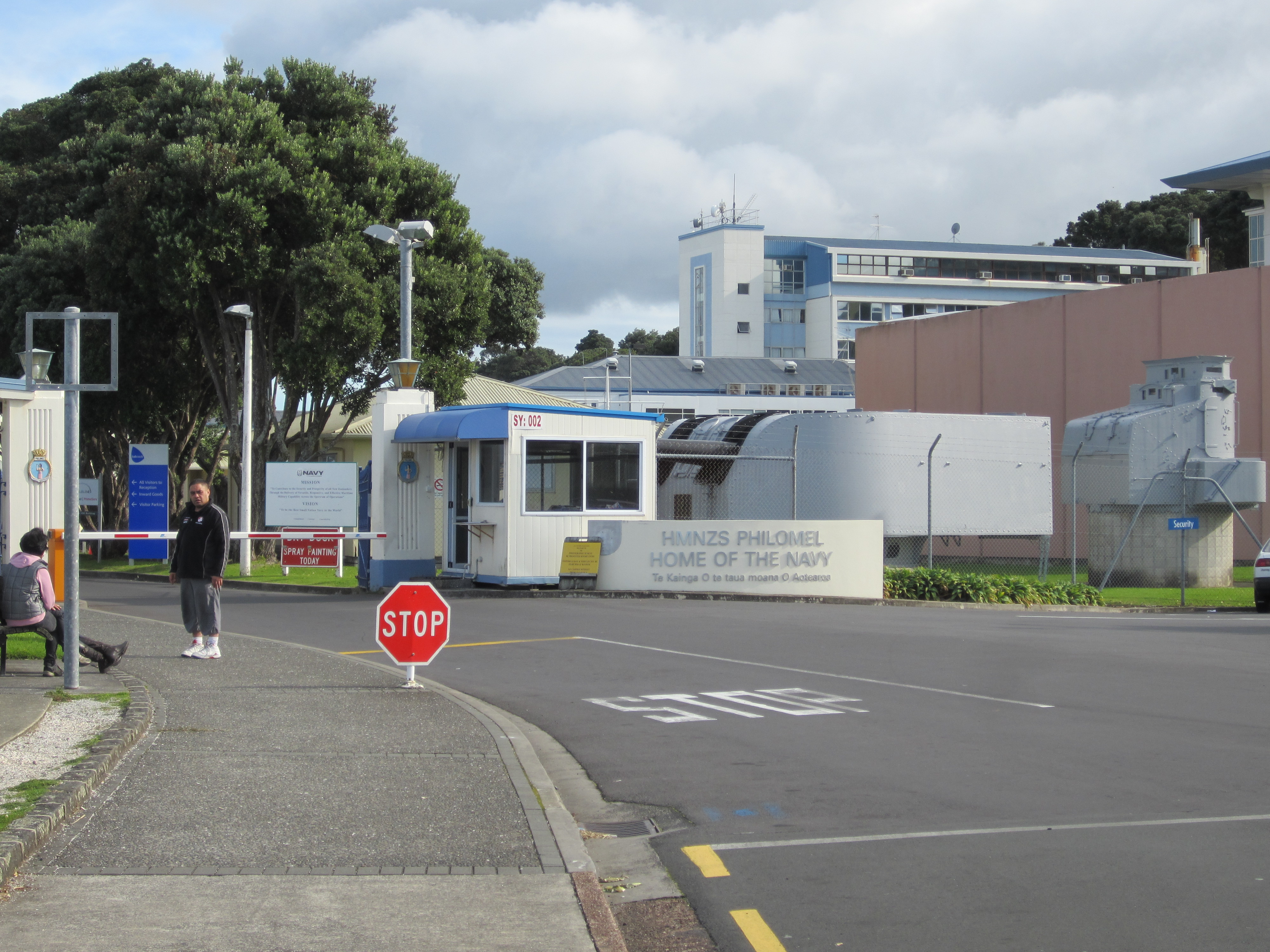
Main gates of the Devonport Naval Base

HMNZS Philomel is the main administrative base of the Royal New Zealand Navy. Originally a training base on board the cruiser from which it takes its name, it is part of the Devonport Naval Base on the North Shore of Auckland, New Zealand.

== History ==
The naval base was founded in 1921 when the New Zealand Division of the Royal Navy was first formed. The old cruiser HMS Philomel, with her engines and armament removed, was moored at the Admiralty reservation, Devonport Dockyard, and re-commissioned as a naval training base. HMS Philomel has been described as the "Cradle of the Navy."

In October 1941, on the creation of the Royal New Zealand Navy, HMS Philomel was recommissioned as the training base HMNZS Philomel. Because of wartime demands for increased training many of her training functions were transferred, along with the ship's main mast, to a new base HMNZS Tamaki situated at Motuihe Island.

Over the years Philomel sprouted many creative additions on her decks in an effort to provide more space for her operations. These physical extensions then spilled over to the use of onshore buildings.

In January 1947 the boat Philomel was finally decommissioned and HMNZS Philomel became a land establishment. In 2000, HMNZS Tamaki was decommissioned with its functions absorbed again by HMNZS Philomel.

== Current ==
Today Philomel is a sprawling land establishment located at Devonport, New Zealand.

It is the home of the Naval Support Services, responsible for the logistics and organisation of Naval personnel, and for visits to the base by foreign ships. Its Naval Community Office provides support for families of naval personnel, and its Te Taua Moana Marae is the cultural home for all naval personnel, regardless of iwi or upbringing. It incorporates the naval college Tamaki, formerly HMNZS Tamaki, which coordinates training within the naval base from new entry or officer training to damage control and command schools that everyone must attend at stages of their career. There are also schools for naval specialisations such as marine engineering, Officer of the Watch, hydrography and communications. The base includes a navy band and a fleet gymnasium.

== Navy museum ==
The first Royal New Zealand Navy museum was established in 1974 and was housed in a single room within HMNZS Philomel. It moved to a separate building in 1982. In 2010 it moved to new, larger facilities at Torpedo Bay, becoming the Torpedo Bay Navy Museum.

== See also ==
- List of Royal New Zealand Navy bases

== References and notes ==
- McDougall, R. J. (1989) New Zealand Naval Vessels, Pages 11–13, 157–158, Government Printing Office. ISBN 978-0-477-01399-4
- Other, A.N. HMNZS Philomel: The cradle of the Royal New Zealand Navy, article in Naval Historical Review, March 1983.
- Walters, Sydney David (1956) The Royal New Zealand Navy: Official History of World War II, Department of Internal Affairs, Wellington Appendix VIII : Record of HMNZS Philomel
