= Devonport Naval Base =

Main base of the Royal New Zealand Navy in Auckland

Coordinates: 36.830241°S 174.786236°E

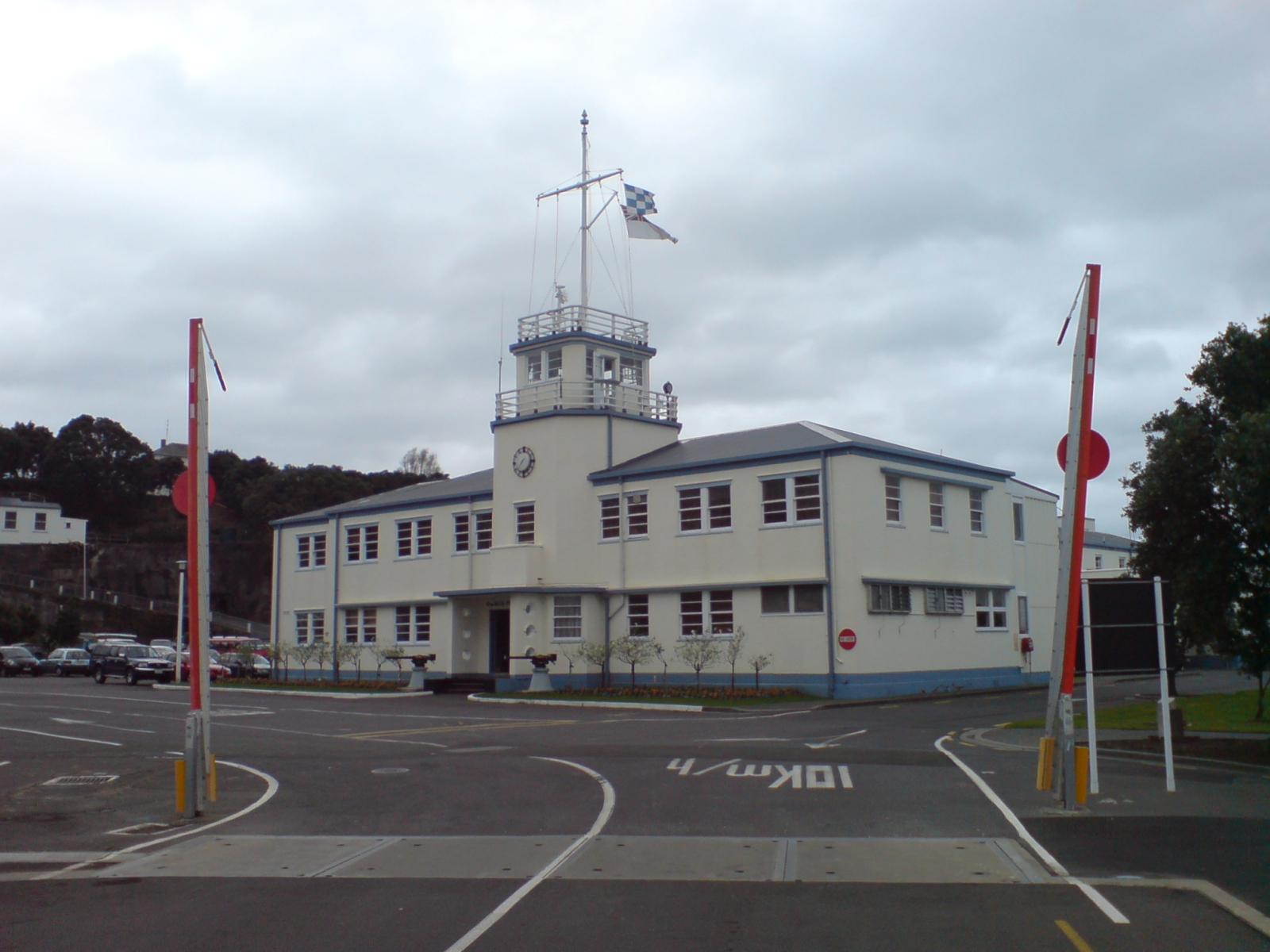
The base headquarters building.

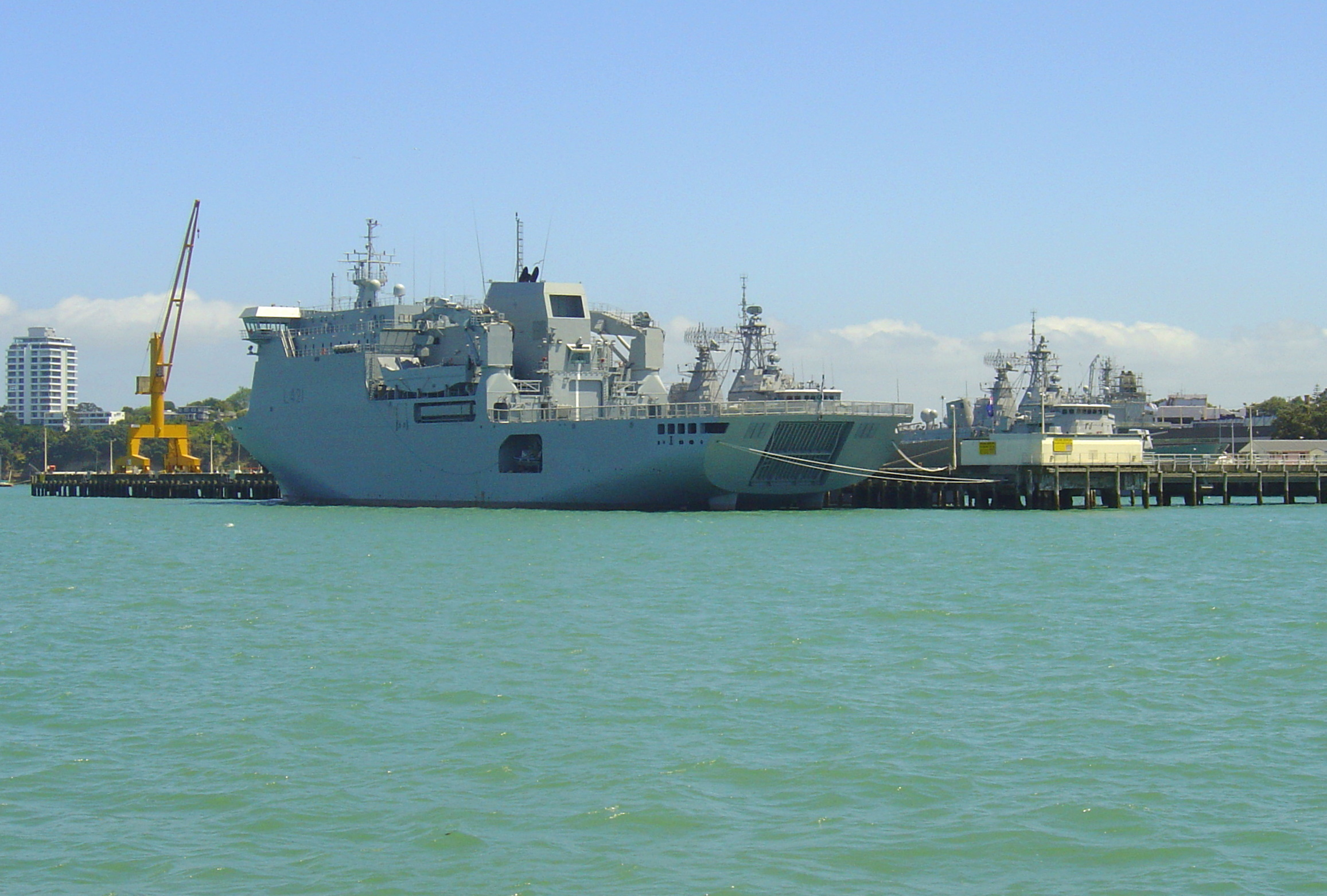
Canterbury berthed at the base.

Map of the Devonport Naval Base

Devonport Naval Base is the home of the Royal New Zealand Navy, located at Devonport, New Zealand on Auckland's North Shore. It is currently the only base of the navy that operates ships, and has been in use as a navy base since 1841. The base consists of HMNZS Philomel (the administration centre for the base), the Fleet Support Organisation, and the Fleet Personnel and Training Organisation.

== History ==
In the 1840s the first naval station in New Zealand was established at Devonport. Devonport was chosen due to the deep water of the harbour.

== Operation ==
All operational units of the Royal New Zealand Navy are based at Devonport. The Navy's munitions are stored and maintained at Kauri Point Armament Depot in Auckland. Senior naval staff are located at the NZDF headquarters in Wellington. The operational headquarters, and the effective fleet commander, the Maritime Component Commander are both located at Headquarters Joint Forces New Zealand adjacent to Trentham Military Camp in the Upper Hutt suburb of Trentham. Within the Royal New Zealand Navy many land-based facilities and services ensure support for ships and personnel when deployed.

== Facilities ==
Shore based support is predominantly based at the Devonport Naval Base, Auckland, with a long and varied list of services and facilities, including facilities for training, sports, and cultural activities, dry dock, as well as engineering and flight support and the Navy Hospital (and Hyperbaric Unit).

== Maritime Engineering Support Team ==
The Navy’s fleet of ships are maintained by the Maritime Engineering Support Team (MEST). The MEST is based at Devonport Naval Base and is a blended workforce of Navy personnel in the Defence Logistics Command (Maritime) and Babcock New Zealand employees. Babcock New Zealand is the Strategic Maritime Partner for the New Zealand Defence Force (NZDF).

The base also has a modern converter system to supply the substantial power even a berthed navy ship requires. As NZ's navy ships use NATO standard 60-hertz power, such converters were needed to enable the base to use power supplied by the national grid. The new converters were installed in the late 2000s for $10 million, and will offer significant savings over using diesel generators, or having the vessels use their own power systems while in port.

=== RNZN College ===
The RNZN College is also situated at Devonport Naval Base. Navy training encompasses numerous disciplines, from Recruit Training Squadron, Junior Officer Common Training and Sea Survival Training Squadron to specialised training for Operational, Technical and Trade, and Support Logistics branches.

=== Calliope Dock ===
One of the more famous elements of the base is the Calliope Dock, a drydock built in 1888 and still in use. At that time, it was the largest in the Southern Hemisphere, and a strategic asset for the Royal Navy. It was named for Calliope Point, out of which it had been hewn by hand over three years. Coincidentally, one of the two first ships to enter it (as a show of her capacity) was HMS Calliope. Administered at first by the Auckland Harbour Board, the dock was transferred to the navy when the Auckland naval base moved from Torpedo Bay to Devonport, into a swamp area next to the dock.
