= Ryazan (disambiguation) =

Ryazan is a city in Russia.

It may also refer to:

== Places ==
- Ryazan Oblast, a federal subject of Russia
- Principality of Ryazan (1078–1521), Russian principality
- Ryazan Governorate (1796–1929), an administrative division of the Russian Empire and the early Russian SFSR
- Ryazan Urban Okrug, a municipal formation which the city of oblast significance of Ryazan in Ryazan Oblast, Russia is incorporated as
- Ryazan (inhabited locality), several inhabited localities in Russia

== Other ==
- FC Ryazan, an association football club based in Ryazan, Russia
- HC Ryazan, an ice hockey club based in Ryazan, Russia
- Ryazan VDV, a women's association football club based in Ryazan, Russia
- SS Ryazan - a number of steamships with the name

== See also ==
- Ryazansky (disambiguation)
