= Charles Trussell =

Musician in Oceania (1860–1946)

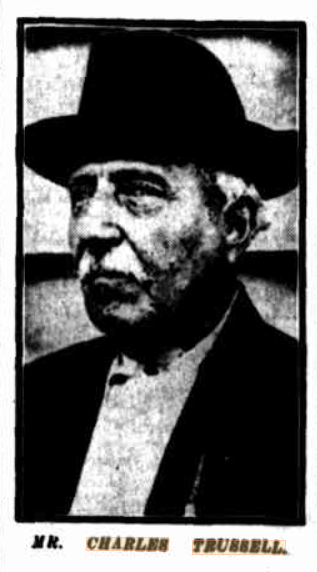
portrait of Australian band conductor and composer Charles Trussell 1860–1946

Charles Trussell aka Carlile Vernon, (1860, London, England – 1946, Bauple, Queensland, Australia) was a prominent musician in brass bands (British style) both in Australia and New Zealand during the late nineteenth and early twentieth centuries. He served as band master of a number of bands in both countries and was a significant composer and arranger of brass band music. He also was an adjudicator at brass band contests. He is also believed to have written vocal music. He is not to be confused with American banjoist and composer H. C. Trussell (of Quincy, Ill.) who was also active in the late 19th and early 20th centuries.

== Biography ==
=== Early life ===
Trussell commenced his musical education in a school boys band in London from the age of 11 playing tenor horn. At 14 he enlisted in the British Army as a band boy and served with the 2nd Battalion of the 14th Regiment of Foot and later the Prince of Wales Regiment in India. During this time he played euphonium and studied musical composition and harmony.

=== Australia ===
In 1887, after 13 years service in the army, Trussell followed relatives to Australia and settled in Maryborough, before moving to Tasmania. Shortly thereafter he was appointed conductor of the Latrobe Brass (later Federal) Band. He also became conductor of the Deloraine Band, conducted a church choir, and later on entertained as part of a group called the Federal Minstrels. In 1895 he was married to Minnie Ada Biggins (b.1863 in Tasmania)

=== New Zealand ===
In 1895, Trussell moved to New Zealand settling in Auckland where he was appointed band master of the Newton (later Auckland Battalion) Band. He also judged band contests, the first being the 1897 Goldfields Band Contest in Te Aroha. He was a prominent member of the North Island Brass Band Association. During this time, he played cricket for the St. Albans Cricket Club in Auckland.

By 1900, he had moved to Nelson and was band master of the Nelson Garrison Band. It was about this time he had composed the Alexandra Dance. In 1901 he composed the march Joys of Life for the national band contest held that year in New Plymouth.

In November 1903 Trussell moved back to the North Island, to Waihi. As band master of the Waihi Federal Band he improved the standard of the band to one of the best in the country.

During this time his compositional output increased, with several marches written each year (including Rimutaka (1905), Mount Egmont (1905), N. I. B. B. A. (1907)), arrangements of operatic selections for contests (including L’ Ebreo (1904) and La Traviata (1906)) and a fantasias Concordia (1903) and The Tournament (1906).

He also competed in lawn bowling competitions in the region.

In April 1907 Trussell hosted the prestigious Besses o' th' Barn Band from England as part of their world tour. Shortly after this, in May 1907, he and his wife were farewelled from Waihi where the town presented him with a marble clock in recognition of the contribution made to the town. Silver hair brushes were presented to his wife. In the press and in band circles, Trussell had become known as "the New Zealand March King".

Confusion has arisen about a later band master of the Waihi Federal Band. Between 1910 and 1914, and again in 1925, the band master was a Mr. T. Russell. It has been assumed that Trussell and Russell were in fact the same person with Trussell's name being a contraction of T. Russell used for composing purposes. It seems this is a misunderstanding and that Charles Trussell and T. Russell appear to be two different people, as both apparently were conducting different bands in different places at the same time. Mr. T. Russell, like Trussell, appears to have originally come from England, but when he returned in 1925, he is recorded as having come back from England. He also apparently returned to England due to ill health. Charles Trussell would have been both coming from and returning to Australia rather than England at this time.

=== Return to Australia ===
In 1907 Trussell moved back to Australia, this time settling in Ipswich, Queensland. He was appointed conductor of the Ipswich Vice-Regal Band, a position he held until his retirement in 1923. His wife died aged 58 in 1925 after an illness.

He then moved to live near Bauple, Queensland. He continued playing with bands and was active composing and arranging (mostly contest pieces for brass bands) during this time receiving high praise for the quality of his music, especially his various selections from Verdi operas

Charles Trussell died on 23 December 1946 aged 85. He is buried in Maryborough Cemetery.

== Known works ==
This list is most likely incomplete. All works listed are composed or arranged for brass band unless otherwise stated. Included are works by the pseudonymous Carlile Vernon. These works are indicated and are believed to be composed by Charles Trussell, but it has also been suggested they are works by Welsh composer William Carlile Bawden (b.1857, d.1925).

- Alexandra (Dance) c. 1899
- Annexation (March) c. 1903
- Aviator (March) c. 1914
- Bridal Rose (Waltz) c. 1916
- Capiscolus (March) c. 1896 This is probably not an original composition by Trussell as reported. It is most likely Trussell conducting a performance the piece Capiscolus (Quickstep) by American William E. M. Petee, 1883. A copy of this piece with Trussell's name stamped on it is held in the Kerepehi Brass Band Library.
- Concordia (Fantasia) c. 1903
- Endymion (Waltz)
- Exhibition (Overture?) (March?) c. 1899
- The Garrison (March) c. 1899
- Gems of Italian Opera (arr. Trussell) c. 1900
- Grand Junction (March) 1905 Dedicated to the Grand Junction Mine in Waihi
- Golden Grain (Waltz) c. 1927
- The Golden North (March)
- Guy Fawkes (March) c. 1900
- Gympie City (March)
- I Lombardi (Selection) (by Verdi, arr. Trussell) c. 1906, Used as Test piece (A Grade) at Christchurch Contest 1907
- I Masnadieri (Selection) c. 1937 (by Verdi arr. C. Trussell)
- Il Bravo (Selection) (by Mercadante, arr. Trussell) c. 1910
- Ingomar (March) c. 1910
- Joys of Life (March), Composed as the A Grade Test March (quickstep) for the New Plymouth Contest, 1902
- Knight Errant (Fantasia) c. 1922
- L’Ebreo (Selection) (Apolloni arr. Trussell) 1902, Arranged specially as test piece for the New Plymouth Contest 1902
- La Mia Speranza (Fantasia) c. 1901 arr. Trussell) (Some publications spell Speranizo rather than Speranza)
- La Traviata (Selection) (Verdi arr. Trussell) 1906, Test Piece Waihi Band Contest., Re-arranged to suit Lismore Contest Test piece (sometime between 1907 and 1914)
- Luisa Miller (Selection) (by Verdi arr. Trussell) c. 1906, Used in 1920 for Brisbane contest
- Lyonia (March) c. 1914
- Maritana (Selection) (by Wallace arr. Trussell) c. 1927
- Martha Hill (March) 1905, Dedicated to the Martha Hill Mine, Waihi
- Mount Egmont(March) 1905, Composed as the A Grade Test March (quickstep) for the Hāwera Contest, 1906
- N G B (Nelson Garrison Band) (March) c. 1900
- N I B B A (North Island Brass Band Association) (March) c. 1907, Composed as the A Grade Test March (quickstep) for the New Plymouth Contest, 1908
- Our Journal (Trio – cornet, tenor horn, trombone)
- Pagliacci (Selection) (Verdi arr. Trussell) c. 1920, written for the Bundaberg Contest 1920
- The Patagonian (March) 1916, used as the A Grade Test March (quickstep) for the Dunedin Contest, 1923
- The Pateena Valse (Waltz) (piano), The title referring to the steamship Pateena
- The President (March) (composed as Carlile Vernon)
- Pride of the North (March) c. 1914
- Princess Royal (Gavotte) (March?) c. 1899
- Queen of the Earth (Waltz) (March?) c. 1917, Possibly the same piece as Queen of the South.
- Queen of the South (Waltz) c. 1917, Possibly the same piece as Queen of the Earth.
- Reminisences of the Opera (Selection) (arr. Trussell) c. 1900
- Rifle Volunteers (March) c. 1903
- Rigoletto (Selection) (by Verdi, arr. Trussell) c. 1919, Test piece for Gympie Contest 1919
- Rimutaka (March) 1903, Composed as the A Grade Test March (quickstep) for the Masterton Contest, 1903, Wanganui wins quickstep at Masterton Contest Rimutaka March listed as being specially composed for the event)
- Rouge et Noir (Overture) c. 1918
- Scotch Melodies (Traditional, arr. Trussell) c. 1902, Possibly same piece as Scotland's Pride.
- Scotland’s Pride (Selection) (Traditional, arr. Trussell) c. 1901, Possibly same piece as Scotch Melodies
- St. Kilda (March) c. 1923
- Takapuna (March) c. 1905
- Tiberius (March) (composed as Carlile Vernon)
- The Tournament (Fantasia) c. 1906
- Trombone Tutor (Method Book, published by John E. Dallas and Sons.) (written as Carlile Vernon)
- Van Diemen (March)
- Verdi (Grand Selection) (arr. Trussell), Quite likely another of his selections composed by Verdi.
- Victorine (Intermezzo?) (March?) c. 1903. A March entitled Victorine composed by William Rimmer (music) exists stamped with C. Trussell. So this is likely to have been mistaken as a composition by Trussell.
- Volunteers Parade (Quick March) c. 1903
- Waihi (March) c. 1903/05, Possibly same piece as Annexation March
- Wairarapa (March) c. 1926, Composed as the A Grade Test March (quickstep) for the Wellington Contest, 1927
- Weel May the Boatie Row (March) c. 1901
- With All My Heart (Cornet Solo) c. 1925
