= German commerce raiders in World War I =

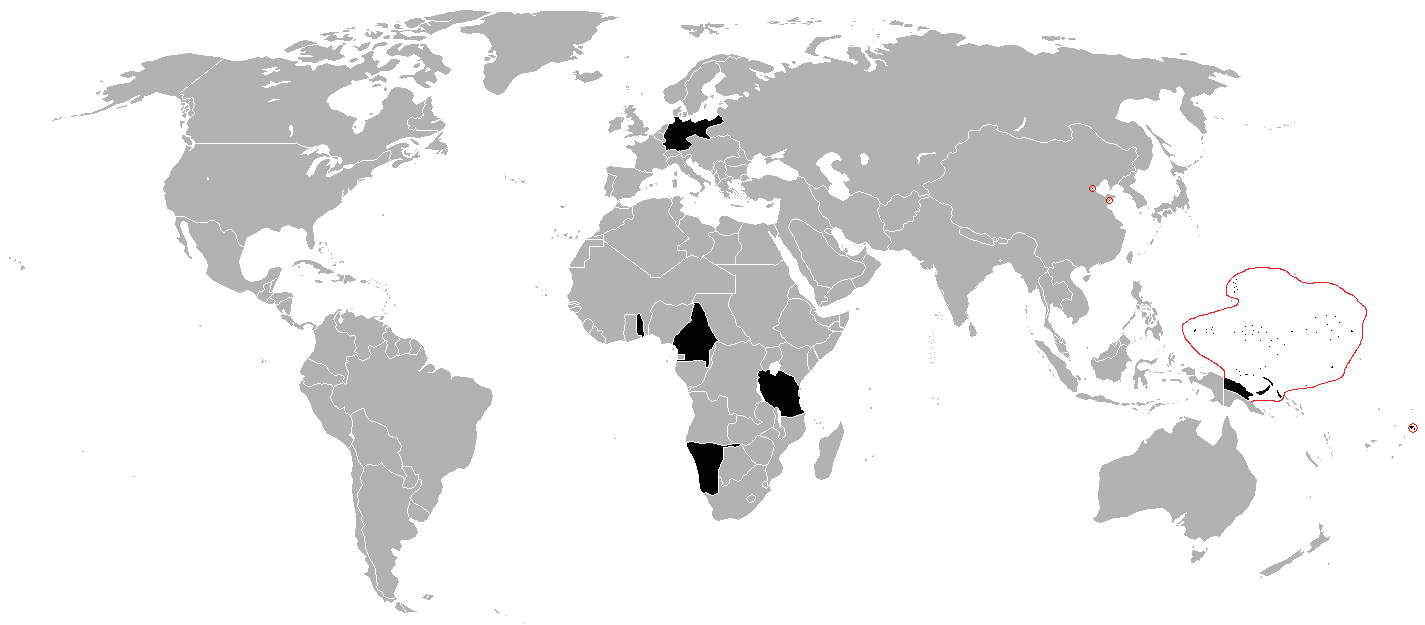
The German colonial empire

The German commerce raiders of World War I were surface vessels used by the Imperial German Navy for its Handelskrieg ("Trade war"), a campaign against Allied seaborne trade. The ships comprised warships, principally cruisers, stationed in the German colonial empire before the war began, express liners commissioned as auxiliary cruisers and later, freighters outfitted as merchant raiders. These vessels had a number of successes and had a significant effect on Allied naval strategy, particularly in the early months of the war.

== Cruisers ==
At the outbreak of the First World War, Germany had two armoured cruisers, six light cruisers and four gunboats stationed overseas, based at ports in the German colonial empire or at neutral ports, protecting German interests. In the west was SMS Karlsruhe (SMS: Seiner Majestät Schiff [His Majesty's Ship]) in the Caribbean and SMS Dresden on the east coast of Mexico. The gunboat SMS Eber was based in the colony of Kamerun (now Cameroon) in west Africa. The cruiser SMS Konigsberg and the gunboat SMS Geier were based in German East Africa. The East Asia Squadron (Kreuzergeschwader or Ostasiengeschwader Vizeadmiral Graf Maximilian von Spee was based at Tsingtau and comprised two heavy cruisers, a light cruiser and two gunboats; the cruisers SMS Leipzig and SMS Nurnberg were at sea. With the commencement of hostilities these ships were ordered to attack Allied trade wherever they found it.

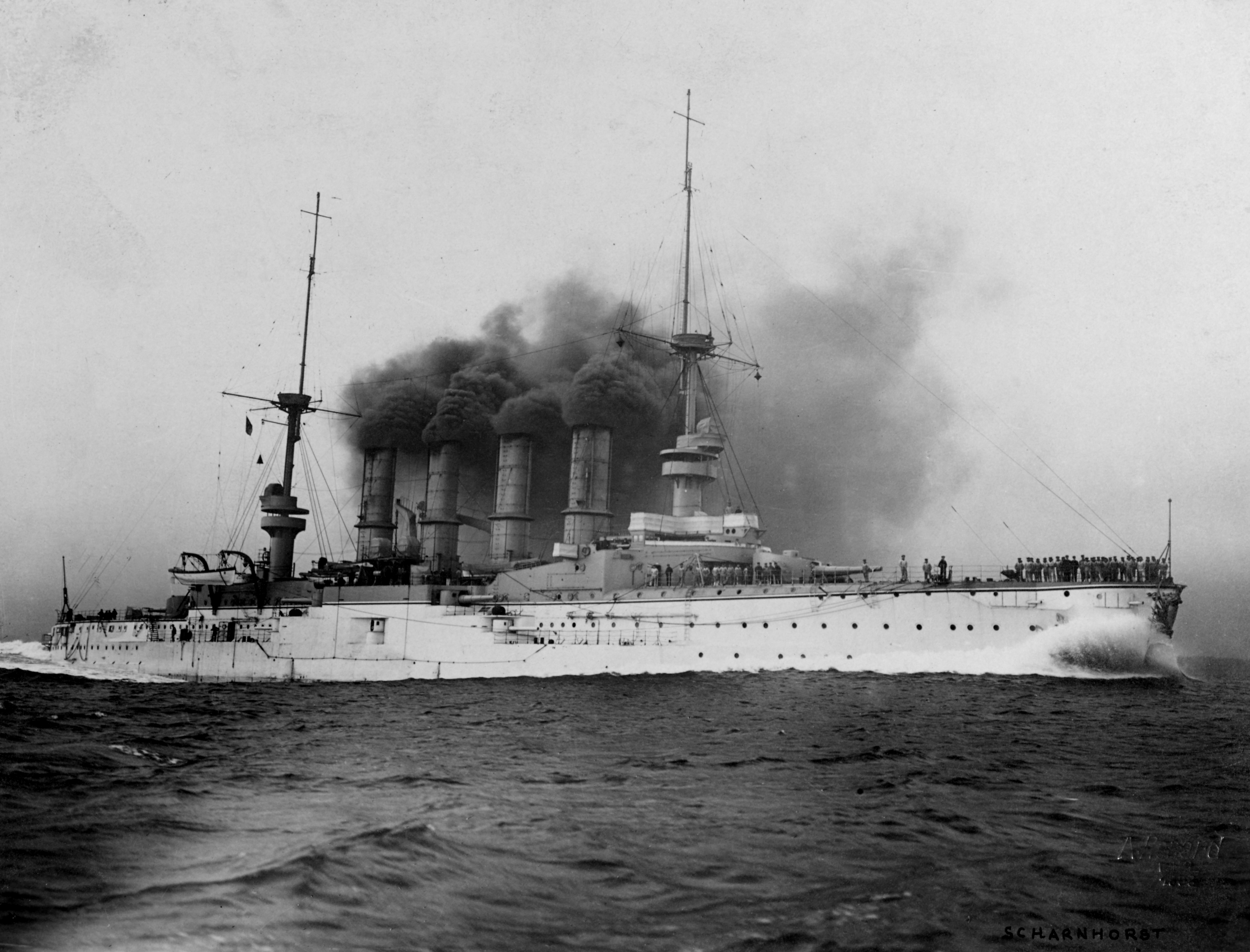
SMS Scharnhorst

At the outbreak of war, the East Asia Squadron was at sea and sailed eastwards across the Pacific to attack British and Allied shipping. He had with him SMS Scharnhorst, SMS Gneisenau and SMS Emden and was quickly joined by Nurnberg and two auxiliary cruisers. Emden was dispatched on a solo raiding voyage in the Indian Ocean, which was highly successful and the East Asia Squadron headed for Chile to secure supplies of coal. At Easter Island in October Spee was joined by Leipzig and Dresden and at the Battle of Coronel in November Spee defeated a British squadron which was searching for the East Asia Squadron. In December Spee was surprised by the British at the Battle of the Falkland Islands when attacking Port Stanley in the Falkland Islands and the East Asia Squadron, save one ship was destroyed. Despite Spee's skill and courage, his mission to destroy Allied commerce where he found it, was a failure. Two British warships were sunk and one sailing ship in his five months' voyage before the East Asia Squadron was destroyed; his detached light cruisers, with one exception, also achieved little.

Nurnberg which had been on detached service, sent to relieve Leipzig had rejoined the East Asia Squadron on the outbreak of war. She had encountered no Allied shipping and made no captures; she was sunk at the Falklands. Leipzig had been at Acapulco in Mexico. She originally headed north along the US west coast, causing British commerce to come to a standstill. She was able to coal at San Francisco before heading south-west to join Spee. In this time she took two ships and two more in the South Pacific. Leipzig was sunk at the Falklands. Dresden, on the east coast of Mexico at the outbreak of war, sailed down the coast of South America, looking for Allied shipping but made only two captures before receiving orders to enter the Pacific and join Spee's squadron. Emden rendezvoused in October 1914 at Easter island. In the Pacific Dresden took two more ships before the destruction of the squadron was destroyed at the Battle of the Falkland Islands in December 1914. Dresden escaped but was run to ground in March 1915 at Mas a Tierra island.

Emden (Fregattenkapitän Karl von Mueller) made one of the most successful raiding cruises of any German warship. After leaving the East Asia Squadron at Pagan Island in August, Emden captured and disposed of sixteen Allied ships and two warships in a four-month career that ranged over the eastern Indian Ocean. Emden was destroyed at the Battle of Cocos on 9 November at Keeling Island by the Australia cruiser HMAS Sydney.

The cruiser Konigsberg and the gunboat Geier were in German East Africa. Konigsberg set out one raiding voyage to the Gulf of Aden and sank a ship; in September she surprised and sank the British cruiser HMS Pegasus in Zanzibar harbour. Lack of coal limited her operations and fear of being cornered in a harbour led to her captain taking refuge in the Rufiji River delta. Konigsberg was discovered in October and the channel to the sea blocked in November; Konigsberg was destroyed six months later. Geier sailed in August and crossed the Indian and the Pacific oceans in search of Allied ships but in three months captured only one ship before interning herself at Honolulu.

In the west, the most successful cruiser was Karlsruhe (Fregattenkapitän Erich Kohler). After meeting and equipping the liner Kronprinz Wilhelm, Karlsruhe set out on a raiding voyage along the South American trade routes. Using her attendant supply ships and prizes to scout for her, Karlsruhe moved through the ocean, able to steam quickly to any target or to evade interception. After two months she had captured and disposed of 16 ships, including one neutral Dutch freighter and taken 500 prisoners. At the end of October the prisoners were dispatched to neutral Tenerife in one of the prizes and Karlsruhe steamed north to raid in the Caribbean. On 4 November 1914, 300 nmi (350 mi; 560 km) east of Barbados, Karlsruhe suffered a calamitous internal explosion, killing Kohler and 260 members of the crew. The survivors were rescued by the supply ship Rio Negro, which had been in attendance and returned to Germany. Before the secret of her loss was exposed in March 1915, Karlsruhe exerted an influence as a ghost ship on British naval strategy, forcing the Allies to guard against possible attacks.

== Liners ==
Before the war the Kaiserliche Marine had listed thirteen fast passenger liners for conversion into auxiliary cruisers and another seven ships, express mail steamers, to serve as supply vessels. The imposition by the Royal Navy of a blockade of German ports as soon as war was declared took the Kaiserliche Marine by surprise. Ships in home ports were trapped and those at sea or in neutral ports were away from their stored armaments; neutral nations were wary of allowing such conversion to take place in their harbours.

The Kaiserliche Marine converted three of the six ships in home ports, though Cap Polonio, as Vineta and Victoria Louise were deemed unsuitable and returned to their owners. Only Kaiser Wilhelm der Grosse carried out a raiding voyage; Cap Finisterre, Prinz Ludwig and Kaiserin August Victoria) were not taken up for conversion and remained in civilian hands.

Of the seven at sea, three were able to avoid British patrols and take up armaments from German warships. Kronprinz Wilhelm met Karlsruhe in the Atlantic, Cap Trafalgar met Eber from German West Africa off Brazil and Prinz Eitel Friedrich sailed to Tsingtau where she was armed from Luchs and Tiger. Kronprinzessin Cecilie, Kaiser Wilhelm II, George Washington, and Prinz Friedrich Wilhelm were unable to return to Germany or meet any German warship and were interned in neutral ports. Two other ships, not originally foreseen but becoming available, were converted to auxiliaries. The liner Berlin, which was at Bremerhaven undergoing repairs, was taken up as a minelayer and raider. In August Emden captured the Russian liner SS Ryazan, earmarked by the Imperial Russian navy as an auxiliary and sent her to Tsingtau for conversion and renamed Cormoran.

Kaiser Wilhelm der Grosse broke through the blockade to raid down the West African coast. After sinking three ships she was intercepted and sunk at the Battle of Río de Oro by the British cruiser Highflyer. Cap Trafalgar was similarly sunk at the Battle of Trindade by the Armed merchant cruiser (AMC) Carmania, before making any captures. Berlin made one voyage, laying mines off Ireland which sank the British dreadnought Audacious before being interned in Norway. Cormoran was able to operate for three months in the Pacific and around the coast of Australia, but without a single success; she was forced into internment in Guam. More successful was Prinz Eitel Friedrich, which operated with Cormoran and the East Asia Squadron before being detached after Coronel in November 1914. She then made a three-month voyage into the Atlantic, making eleven captures before being interned in March 1915 at Newport News in the United States. The most successful of these auxiliaries was Kronprinz Wilhelm, remaining at large for eight months and taking thirteen prizes before she too was interned in April 1915 at Newport News.

== Freighters ==
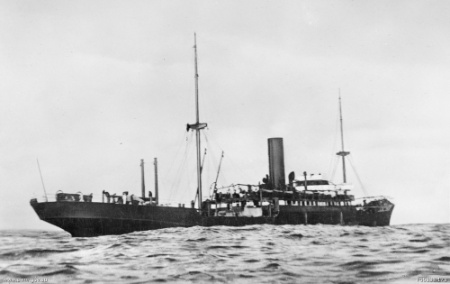
SMS Wolf

Following the collapse of the first phases of Germany's commerce war, the Imperial German Navy turned to the U-boat Arm as an alternative. Despite some successes, the inadequacies of the U-boat as a commerce raider quickly became apparent. Lacking the cruiser's speed and gun armament to overawe its victims, the U-boats were increasingly faced with ships that would resist capture by running or as more and more became defensively armed, by fighting back. Rather than accept defeat, in February 1915 the IGN opted for a policy of unrestricted submarine warfare, a policy which inevitably led to the deaths of civilians, neutrals and other non-combatants and created considerable political difficulties. Another approach proposed was the outfitting of ordinary freighters as commerce raiders and initially minelayers. In contrast to the first auxiliaries these ships would be chosen for their endurance and range, relying on disguise rather than speed to escape destruction.

The ship was Meteor, which laid mines and attacked shipping in the White Sea during May and June 1915. A second voyage in August saw her involved in a gun-battle with a blockade ship, and she was later scuttled to avoid capture. In November 1915 the most successful of these raiders, the Möwe, set out on her first voyage. In four months she accounted for 15 ships, totalling 50,000 GRT, and successfully returned to Germany unscathed. In February 1916 Wolf was wrecked while setting out from Kiel (Note: This was a different ship the more famous raider of the same name which operated the following year.) and the same month Greif was sunk when she was intercepted by the RN blockade. In August 1916 Möwe was out again, this time masquerading as Vineta in an attempt to confuse Allied intelligence and taking a prize off Norway. In November she made a longer voyage to the South Atlantic and captured 25 ships. Möwe was able to extend her range by taking fuel and supplies from her prizes; she also outfitted one of them (commissioned as Geier) to act as an auxiliary and sent another back to Germany for conversion into a raider.

Also in November 1916 another raider, also called Wolf, started a voyage of 15 months, to South Africa, the Indian Ocean and Australia, sinking 14 ships and laying mines that destroyed 15 more. Wolf was also able to extend her range with goods from her prizes, prolonging her voyage to a record-breaking 15 months. She too outfitted a prize (commissioned as Iltis) to assist as an auxiliary minelayer. In December 1916 the most unusual raider, Seeadler, set out; a fully rigged sailing ship (though equipped with auxiliary motors) Seeadler sailed all the way to the South Pacific and sank 13 ships before being wrecked on a reef after eight months of operations The last raider, Leopard, (the prize sent in by Möwe) set out in March 1917, but she too was intercepted by the RN blockade and in a fierce gun-battle was sunk with all hands. With the return of Möwe that month, Germany's experiment with surface raiders was virtually ended, though Wolf remained at large for another year. In February 1917 Germany started another campaign of unrestricted submarine warfare, which, despite huge damage to Allied shipping, failed to defeat the Allies, but led to angry neutrals (most prominently the USA) joining the war against her.
