= New Zealand Army Band =

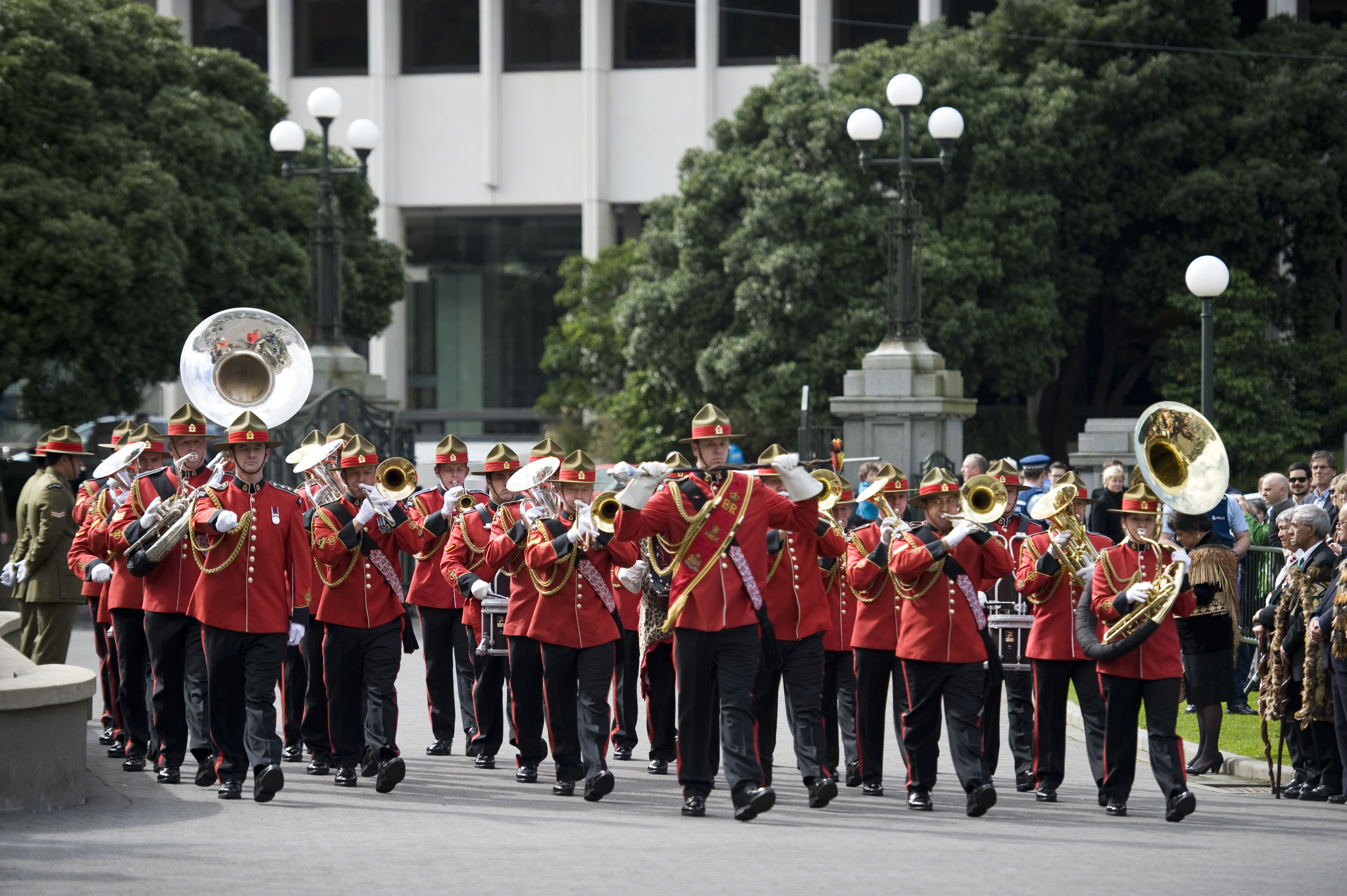
- Marching at the 2011 swearing-in of Sir Jerry Mateparae as Governor-General of New Zealand

Background information
- Origin: Wellington, New Zealand
- Genres: Marches, Ceremonial; Pop, Rock, Jazz
- Years active: 1964; 62 years ago
- Labels: K-tel; Universal Music Oy; Digital Distribution Serbia; Universal Music Digital Luxembourg; Universal Music France Digital Only
- Website: https://web.archive.org/web/20190203235244/http://www.army.mil.nz/about-us/who-we-are/nz-army-band/

The New Zealand Army Band (Māori: Puoro Puoro Ngāti Tūmatauenga) is a premier brass ensemble that serves as the official musical representative of the New Zealand Army. Established in 1964 by Captain (later Major) James Carson MBE (1934–2008) of the Royal New Zealand Infantry Regiment.

The band performs an extensive repertoire ranging from traditional military marches and ceremonial works to pop, rock, and jazz. Over its six-decade history, it has become one of New Zealand’s most respected and recognisable musical institutions, performing nationally and internationally as cultural ambassadors of the New Zealand Defence Force.

It is based out of Burnham Camp, which is the largest army base on the South Island. Presently, the New Zealand Army Band and the Officer Cadet School are the only units of the New Zealand Army that employ scarlet tunics as part of their full dress uniforms. The black lemon squeezer hat is also used as headgear for the band. 36-members strong, it includes a parade band, a concert brass band as well as incorporating a rhythm section and vocalists.

The band sports an official newsletter entitled Espirit De Corps that generally publishes two articles a year.

== History ==
At the time of its establishment, the number of territorial and regional army bands was reduced from a larger network down to seven. The newly formed New Zealand Army Band was conceived as a central, full-time ensemble that would represent the entire New Zealand Army at state, ceremonial, and international occasions. It quickly became recognised for its precision, versatility, and high musical standards, embodying the spirit and discipline of the modern New Zealand soldier-musician.

From 1965 to 1988, band members undertook regular overseas service with the Band of the 1st Battalion, Royal New Zealand Infantry Regiment (1 RNZIR). Based originally at Terendak Camp, Malaysia, this deployment followed a two-year rotation system, reflecting New Zealand’s continuing military and diplomatic presence in Southeast Asia. The soldiers of music not only supported military engagements but also served as cultural ambassadors, performing across Malaysia, Singapore, and other allied nations. These biannual postings continued until December 1988, when the regimental band was disestablished and its personnel were returned to the parent New Zealand Army Band.

In 2012, the New Zealand Army Band was one of only three military bands spared during a government-led restructure and cost-cutting review of the Defence Force’s music services. Its survival reaffirmed the ensemble’s cultural significance and its continuing role as New Zealand’s premier military music ambassador.

== Marching displays ==
Noted military tattoos has had the band travelling to Edinburgh, Scotland; Basel, Switzerland; Bremen, Germany; Nanchang, China; Wonju, South Korea and many more. During its visit to Scotland in 2018 for the Edinburgh Military Tattoo, the band was presented with the Pooley Sword after being voted by the cast as the most popular and highest-contributing ensemble of the show. They have since gone on to win the award on four occasions. The band's first performance was a concert in Auckland in 1964. The Army Band celebrated its 20th anniversary in 1984 with an American-style Big Band march down Queen Street.

The drum major of the band uses a tewhatewha, a long-handled Māori club weapon in the shape of an axe, instead of a mace to give direction and keep time.

=== Ensembles ===
- Brass Band
- Swing Band
- Dance Covers Band
- Brass Quintet

== Quick marches ==
Title	Composer / Arranger
Invercargill March	Alex Lithgow
The Great Little Army	Kenneth J. Alford
Colonel Bogey	Kenneth J. Alford
The Garrison	Charles Trussell

== Leadership ==
The current senior appointments within the band are:

- Officer Commanding – Major Julie Richardson MMgt, BSc, PGDipBusAdmin, DipBus, NZIC
- Bandmaster – WO2 Nick Johnson BA MA, PGCE, LRSM, LTCL, ALCM.
- Drum Major – Staff Sergeant Ross Yorkstone
- Senior Staff Composer/Arranger – Sergeant Riwai Hina (ResF)

== Honours ==
Major James Donald Carson was appointed a Member of the Order of the British Empire, in the 1974 Queen's Birthday Honours and received the Queen Elizabeth II Silver Jubilee Medal in 1977.

Warrant Officer Class One Graeme Alexander Bremner, the band’s longest-serving member having enlisted in 1965, was awarded the New Zealand Distinguished Service Decoration in the 2014 New Year Honours.

In 2017, Major Graham Ross Hickman was likewise recognised in the 2017 New Year Honours for his services to the New Zealand Defence Force and the brass band community.

Other recipients of national honours include:

1978 R. A. Cowan BEM

1980 J. A. Elliot BEM

1982 G. H. P. Hanify MBE

1986 K. L. Jarrett MBE

1991 C. A. Campbell BEM

2000 T. H. Bremner MNZM

2006 K. A. J. Tremain QSM

2013 F. I. Levien QSM

2025 K. K. Green KSM

2026 L. Martin KSM

== Discography ==
The band has released the following CDs:

- On Parade (1974)
- Entertainers Supreme (1976)
- Brass To Go (1977)
- Star Brass (1978)
- Brass on the March (1979)
- Chips and Other Tasty Goodies (1981)
- Royal Wedding (1981) - AUS #49
- Conflict - Tunes Of Glory (1981)
- Chameleon (1999)
- An Album Of Two Halves (2001)

== Gallery ==
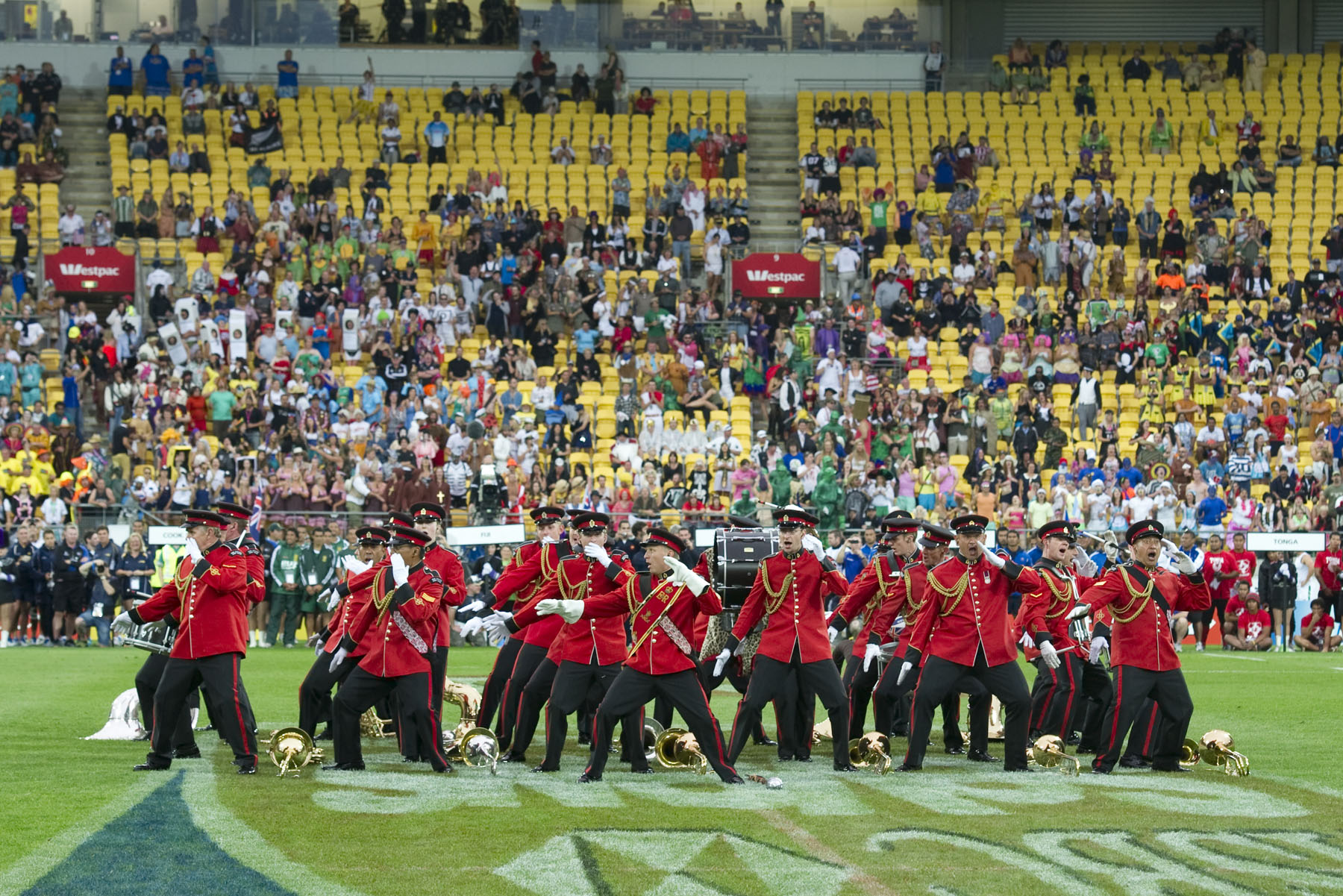

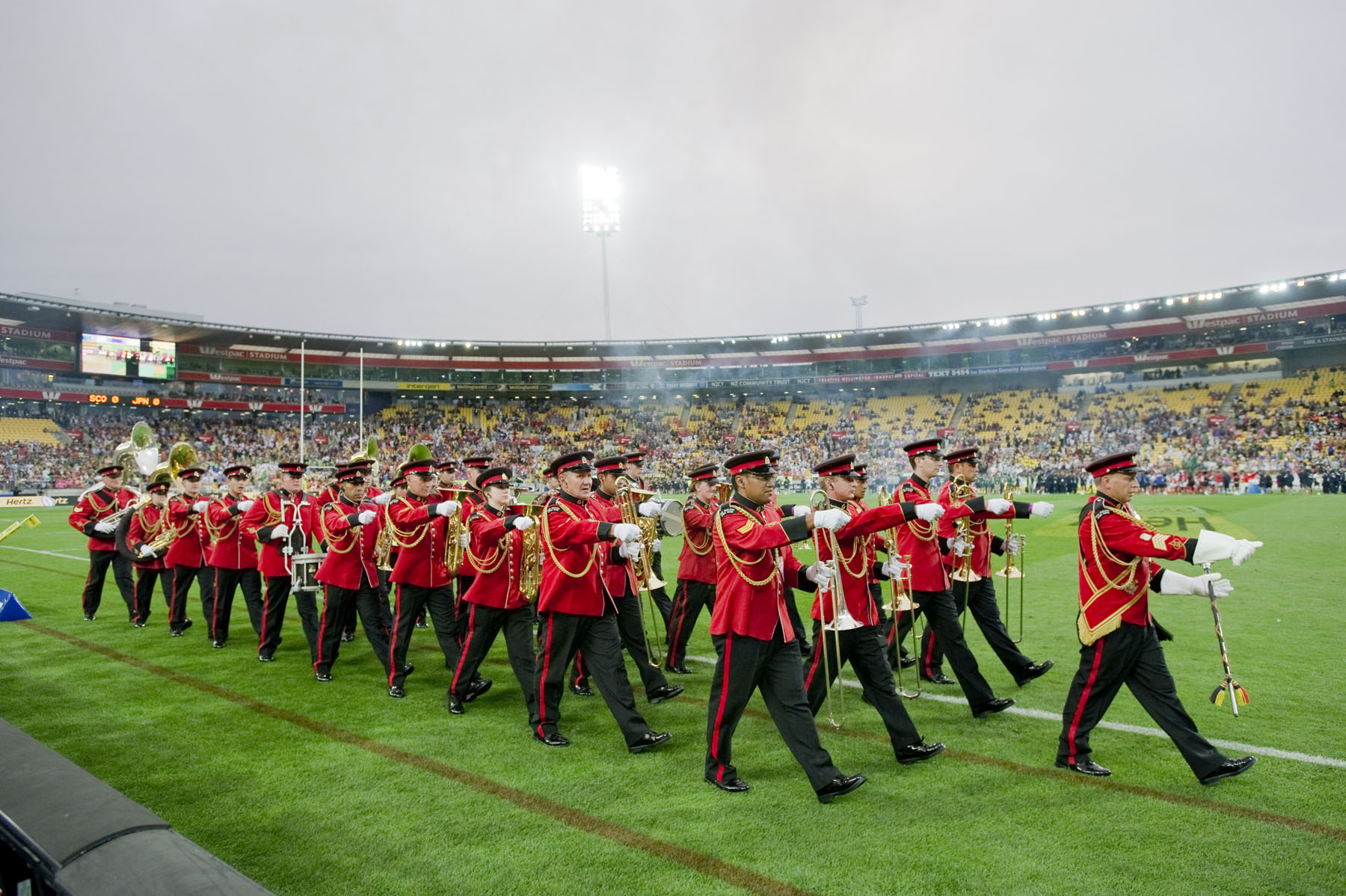

== See also ==
- List of military units based in or affiliated with the South Island
- Band of the Royal Regiment of New Zealand Artillery
- Royal New Zealand Air Force Band
- Royal New Zealand Navy Band
- Nelson Garrison Band
