= Vasselon =

Vasselon is a surname. Notable people with the surname include:

- Marius Vasselon (1841–1924), French painter
- Pascal Vasselon (born 1963), French automotive engineer
