= Royal New Zealand Navy Band =

Military band from New Zealand

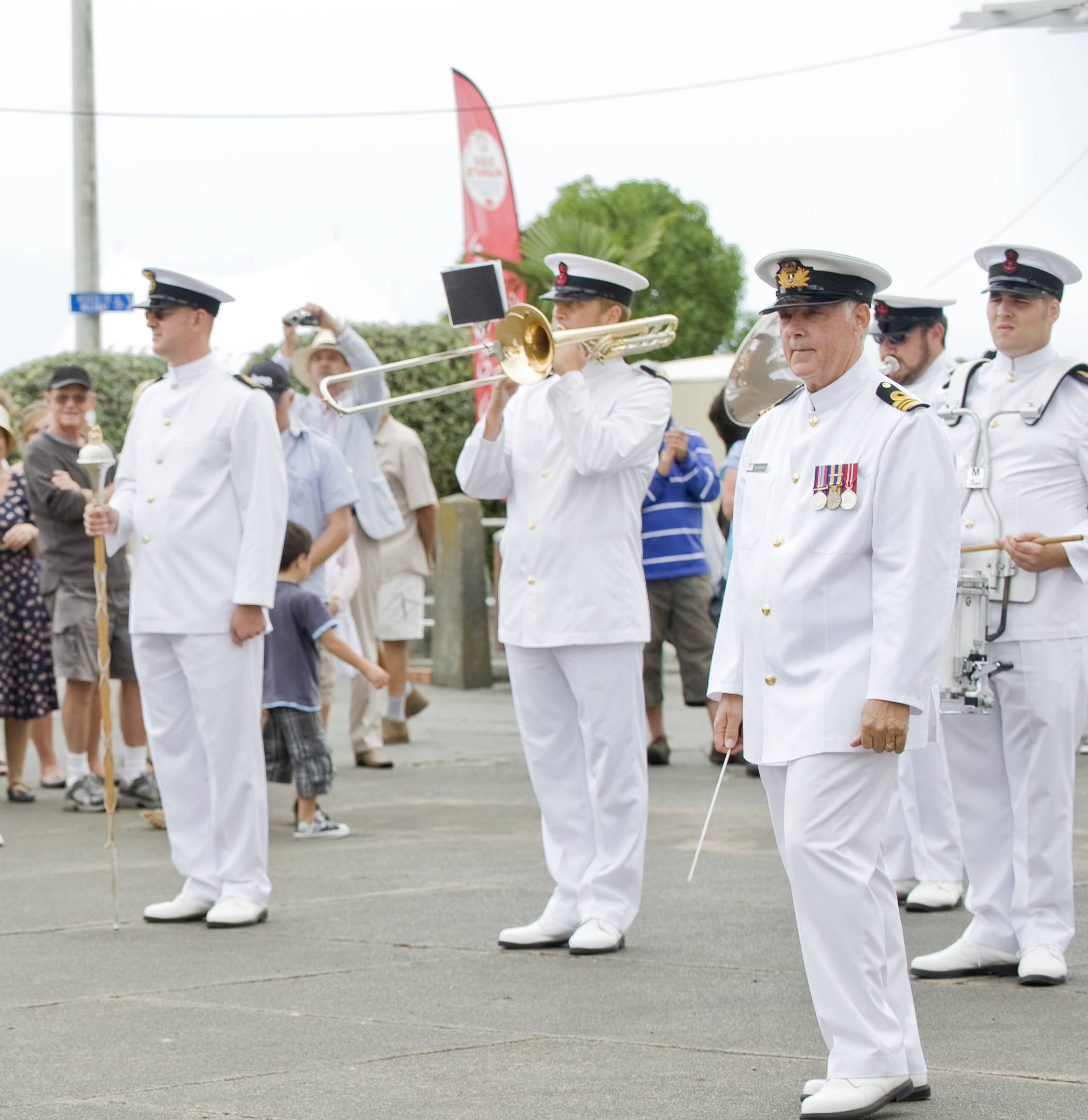
- The band in February 2011 under musical director LtCdr Keith Anderson.
- Active: 1959–present
- Country: New Zealand
- Branch: Royal New Zealand Navy
- Type: Military band
- Role: public duties
- Size: 32
- Part of: HMNZS Philomel
- Headquarters: Devonport Naval Base, Auckland
- Nickname: RNZN Band
- March: Heart of Oak

The Royal New Zealand Navy Band is the official musical unit of the Royal New Zealand Navy. It is based at HMNZS Philomel at Devonport Naval Base in Auckland and provides musical support for naval, ceremonial, and public events.

The band has 32 members and performs in a variety of ensembles, including:

- Concert Band
- Parade Band
- Big Band
- Jazz combo
- Rock band
- Brass quintet and brass ensemble
- Other small ensembles, formed as required for ceremonial, official, and public engagements.

== History ==
=== History of New Zealand Navy Bands ===
Bands of the Royal Marines served with the Royal New Zealand Navy for more than 36 years. The first Royal Marines band arrived in New Zealand in 1924 aboard HMS Dunedin, serving with the New Zealand Division of the Royal Navy. In addition to their musical duties, members of the bands often performed military police duties while off duty.

During most of the Second World War, the cruisers HMNZS Achilles and HMNZS Leander each maintained a Royal Marines band of twelve musicians. By 1944, following HMS Leander decommissioning from RNZN service and HMS Achilles entering refit, only one Royal Marines band remained in service, consisting of fifteen musicians. After the war, a Royal Marines detachment and band arrived aboard the cruiser HMNZS Bellona in 1946, continuing the long-standing tradition of Royal Marines musicians serving with the Royal New Zealand Navy.

=== RNZN Band ===
The Royal Marines detachment departed New Zealand on 27 November 1951, although the band remained to serve as the official band of the Royal New Zealand Navy (RNZN). In 1952, it was elevated to Class A status under the command of a commissioned bandmaster.

In 1953, the band was transferred from HMNZS Bellona to HMNZS Philomel and redesignated as the New Zealand Station Royal Marines Band under the command of the Naval Officer in Charge, Auckland. It became the representative band of the RNZN, rather than serving a single ship. During this period, the band performed a wide range of ceremonial and public duties, including participating in a full-scale production of The Mikado staged by HMNZS Irirangi, touring New Zealand in concert, and performing at the Presentation of the Queen’s Colour to the RNZN by Queen Elizabeth II in 1953. During the 1953-54 Royal Tour of New Zealand, the band was embarked aboard HMNZS Black Prince, which escorted the Royal Yacht.[2][3]

In 1959, the Naval Board approved the formation of the Royal New Zealand Navy Band to replace the New Zealand Station Royal Marines Band following the conclusion of Royal Marines service in New Zealand. A farewell service was held at the Chapel of St Christopher on 20 March 1960, during which Lieutenant C. G. McLean, the bandmaster, was presented with a plaque bearing the crest of the City of Auckland. The Royal Marines band formally concluded its service in New Zealand on 6 April 1960.

In 2012, the Royal New Zealand Navy Band was one of three New Zealand military bands retained following government defence force restructuring.[4]

=== Noted Previous Bandmasters or Director of Music (DoM) ===
Lieutenant Commander C.G. McLean

Lieutenant V.J. Harris

Lieutenant D. Carpenter

Lieutenant Commander G. Brownrigg

Lieutenant G. Parr

Lieutenant Commander K. Anderson

Lieutenant Commander O. Clarke

Lieutenant Commander M. Dowrick

=== The band today ===
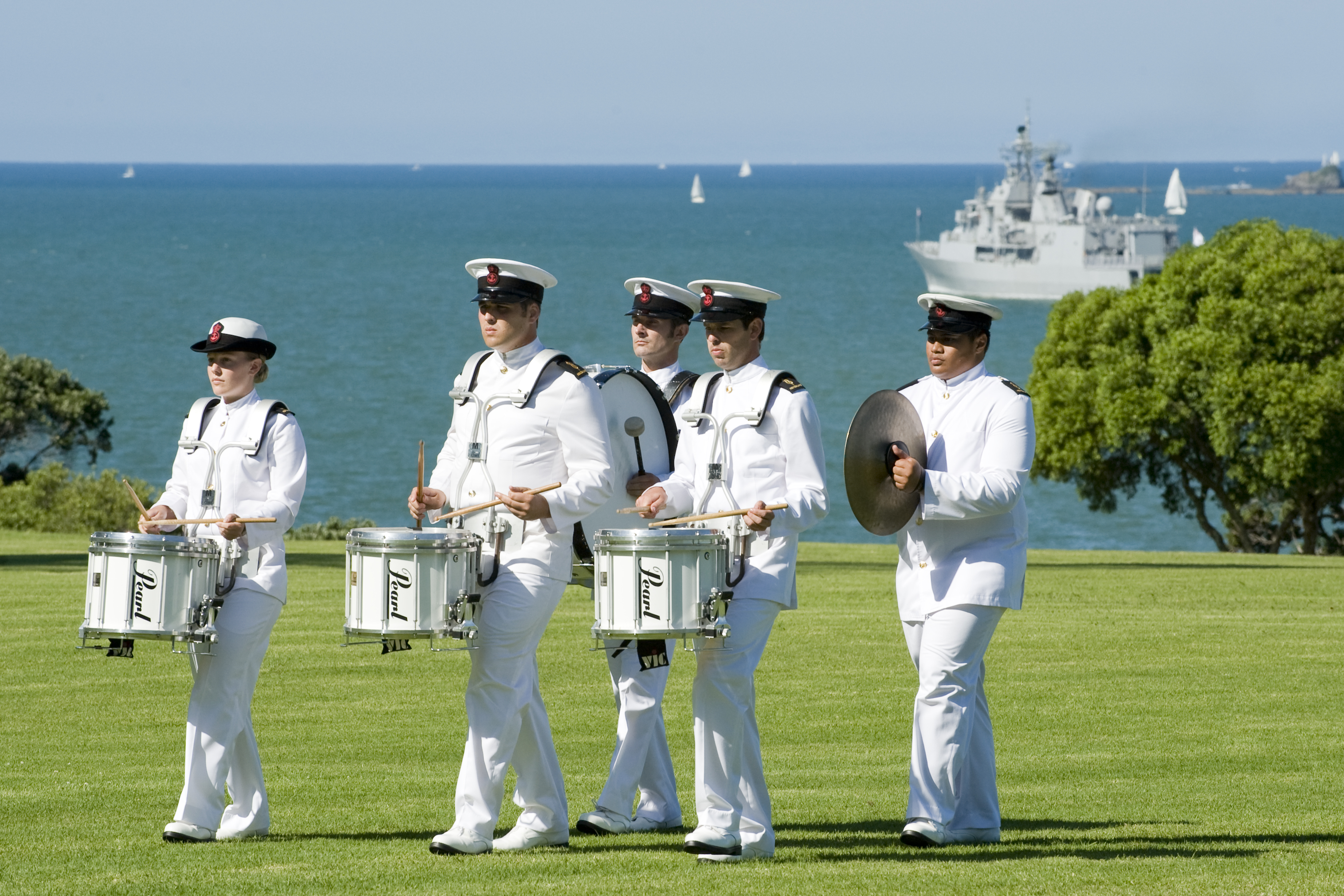
The band's drumline during the 171st commemorations of the signing of the Treaty of Waitangi, 5 February 2011.

The Royal New Zealand Navy Band maintains a regular programme of ceremonial, military, and public duties throughout New Zealand, with a particular focus on the Auckland region. The band is based at HMNZS Philomel on Devonport Naval Base, where it rehearses in its purpose-built facility, known as the “Narrow Neck”.[5] The band has toured and performed at concerts and military tattoos in countries such as South Korea, Japan, Tonga, Canada, the United Kingdom, and the United States.

== See also ==
- New Zealand Army Band
- Royal Australian Navy Band
- Pacific Fleet Band
- Singapore Armed Forces Band
- Band of the Royal Regiment of New Zealand Artillery
