= Royal New Zealand Air Force Band =

Military band from New Zealand

Royal New Zealand Air Force Band (RNZAF BAND)
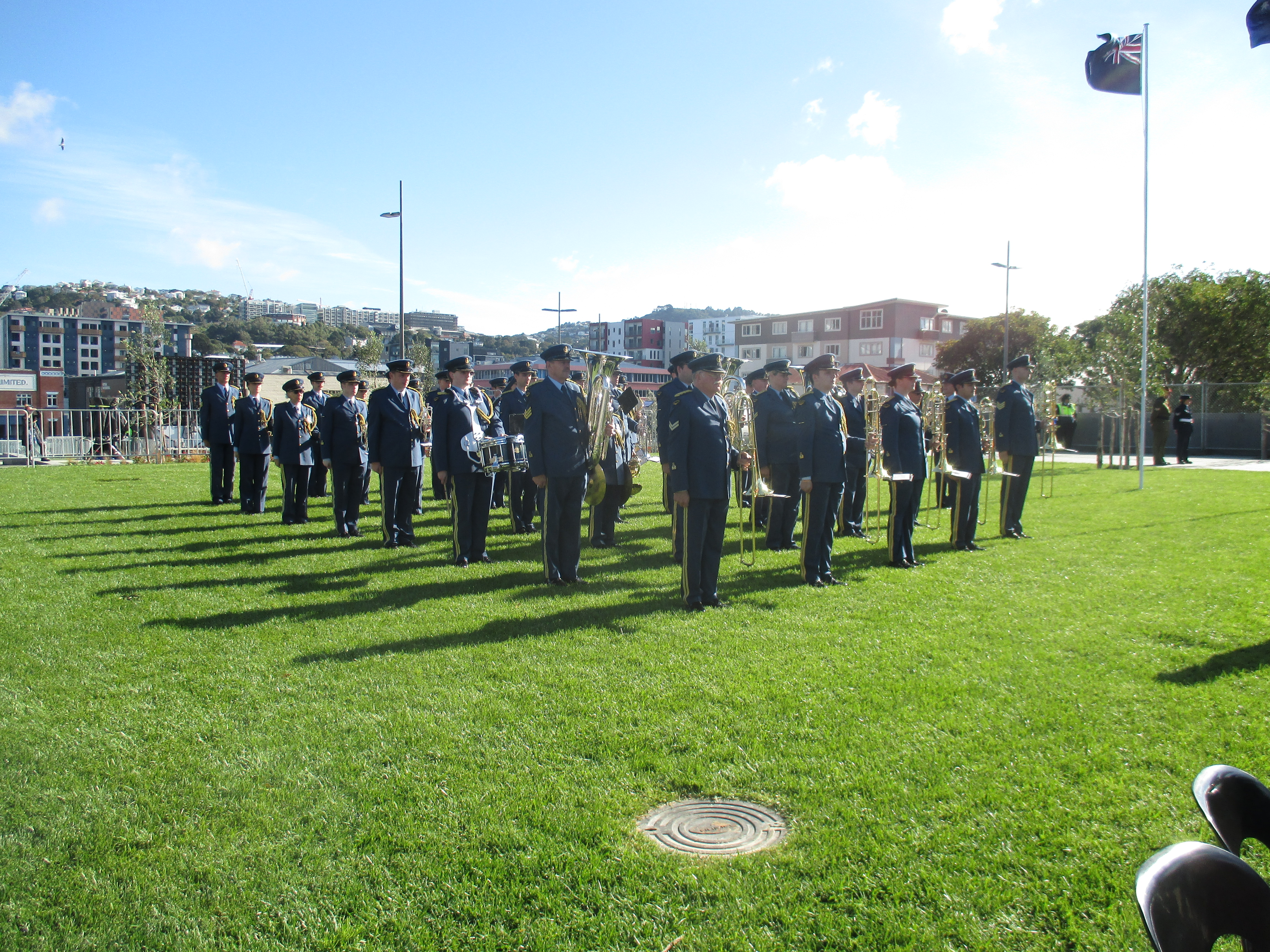
- The band at the dedication of the Australian Memorial at Pukeahu National War Memorial Park on 20 April 2015.
- Active: 1994–present
- Country: New Zealand
- Branch: Royal New Zealand Air Force
- Type: Military Band
- Size: 60
- Garrison/HQ: Wellington, New Zealand
- Nickname(s): RNZAF Band
- Colours: Blue

Commanders
- Notable commanders: Sir Frank Callaway

The Royal New Zealand Air Force Band (formerly the Central Band of the Royal New Zealand Air Force until 2012) is the musical arm of the Royal New Zealand Air Force, based in the capital of Wellington. It is part of the Air Force Reserve, and is composed of part-time musicians.

It is a 65-member band that consists of the following ensembles:

- Parade Band
- Symphonic Band
  - RNZAF Jazz Orchestra
- Woodwind Trio
- Clarinet Quartet
- Brass ensemble
- 5-piece Dance ensemble

Throughout the years, the RNZAF Band have worked with musical organizations and units such as the civilian New Zealand Symphony Orchestra and Orchestra Wellington Jan Van der Roost as well as the United States Air Force Band. A notable member of the band includes Frank Callaway, an Australia-born music educator and administrator.

== History and contemporary duties ==
The band was formed in 1935, when the RNZAF was still known as the New Zealand Permanent Air Force of the Royal Air Force of Britain. When it became an independent service in 1937, the band gave their first public engagement during a 1937 coronation parade. During World War II, the RNZAF band toured New Zealand to perform for airman and in 1944 toured the Pacific to increase the morale of Kiwi soldiers and air warfare forces in the Pacific War. In 1945, the band was disestablished, but was later re-formed in 1951 as a reservist unit. In 2012, it was one of three bands spared in the government cutback on military bands.

Many members of the band are graduates of the New Zealand School of Music. The band maintains a regular schedule of public duties in Wellington, the national capital. As such, it has the unique ability to perform for the arrival of international dignitaries and national ANZAC Day services. During the 4-year First World War centenary, the band's buglers played at over 1,200 Last Post bugle calls from all the way until Armistice Day in 2018. Members of the band have provided music at significant commemorations around the world, including at locations in Turkey, Crete, France and Belgium.

== See also ==
- New Zealand Army Band
- Royal Australian Air Force Band
- Central Band of the Royal Air Force
- Band of the Royal Regiment of New Zealand Artillery
