= Felix von Luckner =

German nobleman

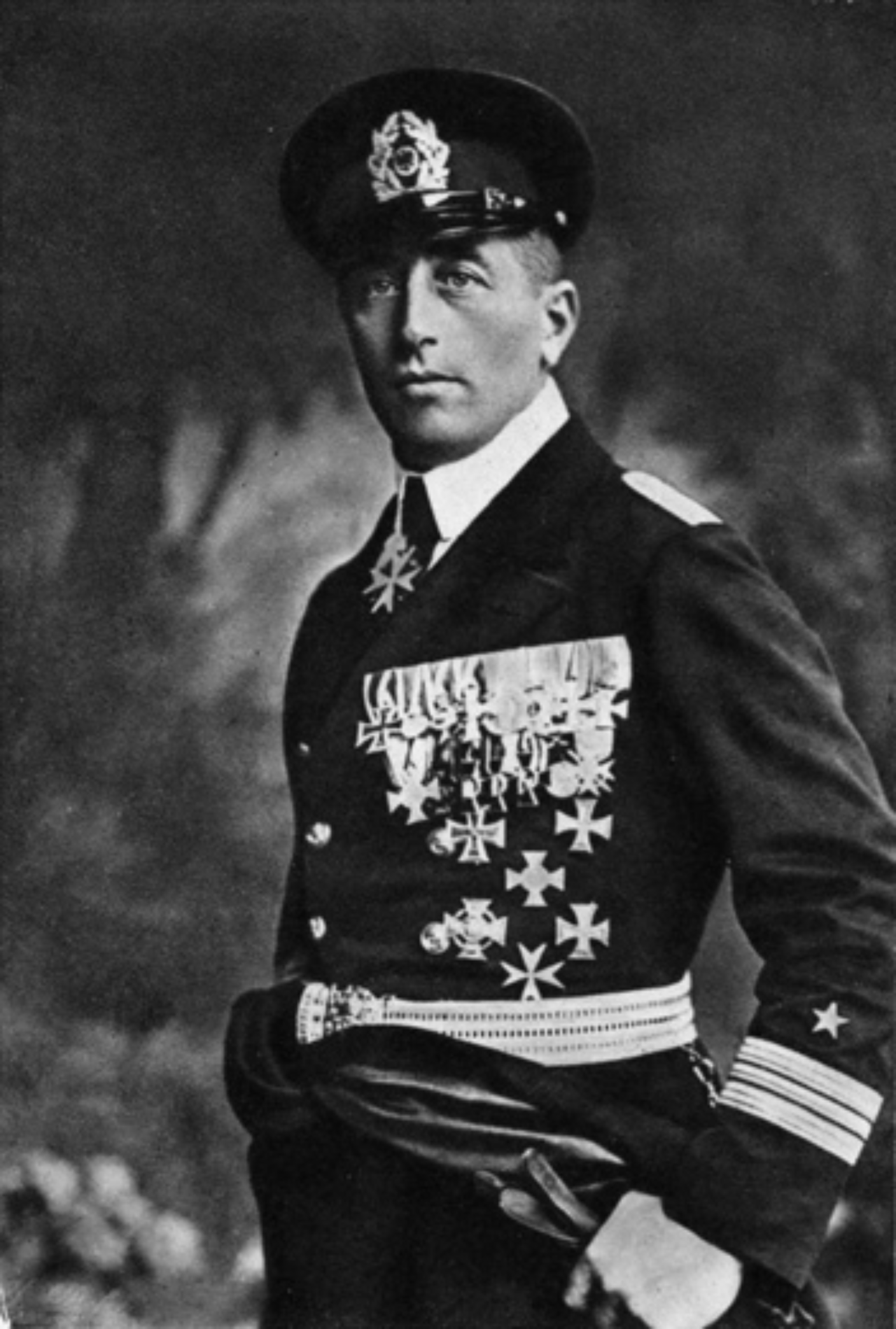
- Born: 9 June 1881; Dresden, German Empire
- Died: 13 April 1966 (aged 84); Malmö, Sweden
- Military career
- Allegiance: German Empire (1903-04, 1908-19); Weimar Republic (1918–22)
- Branch: Imperial German Navy; Reichsmarine
- Service years: 1903–04, 1908-22
- Rank: Korvettenkapitän (Captain)
- Nicknames: Der Seeteufel (The Sea Devil); Die Piraten des Kaisers (The Emperor's Pirates)
- Units: SMS Panther; SMS Kronprinz
- Commands: SMS Seeadler; Kronprinzessin Cecilie (sloop); Niobe (Barque)
- Conflicts: World War I: Battle of Heligoland Bight; Battle of Jutland; Commerce raiding campaign
- Awards: Pour le Mérite; Iron Cross 1st Class; Order of Merit of the Federal Republic of Germany
- Other work: Sailor, author, memoirist

Felix Nikolaus Alexander Georg Graf von Luckner (9 June 1881, Dresden – 13 April 1966, Malmö), sometimes called Count Luckner in English, was a German nobleman, naval officer, author, and sailor who earned the epithet Der Seeteufel (the Sea Devil), and his crew that of Die Piraten des Kaisers (the Emperor's Pirates), for his exploits in command of the sailing commerce raider SMS Seeadler (Sea Eagle) during the First World War. After the war, Luckner became a war hero in Germany and was renowned around the world for his seamanship and chivalrous conduct during the war, which resulted in a minimal loss of life on both sides.

== Early life ==
Luckner was born in Dresden, Germany, the great-grandson of Nicolas Luckner, Marshal of France and commander-in-chief of the French Army of the Rhine, who in the 18th century was elevated to the rank of Count (Graf) by the King of Denmark.

=== First journey ===
The young Luckner had dreams of being a sailor, but his father was determined that he should follow the family tradition and go into the cavalry. After failing his exams at various private schools, at the age of thirteen Luckner ran away to sea, with the promise in his mind that he would not return until he was wearing "the Emperor's naval uniform, and with honour". He signed up, under the assumed name of "Phylax Lüdecke", as an unpaid cabin boy on the Russian sailing ship Niobe travelling between Hamburg (Germany) and Australia. His story might have ended there, because the Russian captain, fearing that the lives of other crew members would be endangered, refused to allow a lifeboat to be launched in order to pick Luckner up when he fell overboard in the middle of the ocean. The chief mate defied the captain (who had threatened him with a harpoon), and launched a lifeboat with the help of volunteers. As a number of albatrosses circled over Luckner, one swooped down and seized his outstretched hand in its beak, but Luckner grabbed the bird in desperation. Although severely pecked, he hung on for his life. The flapping of the bird's huge wings and the circling of the other albatrosses gave the crew of the lifeboat a point to aim at in his rescue.

==== Unpaid cabin boy or paid sailor? ====
The description of Luckner's young life travelling the world on sailing ships is taken directly from his 1921 memoir, Seeteufel: Abenteuer aus meinem Leben, and the English language version, Count Luckner, the Sea Devil, written by the American journalist and broadcaster Lowell Thomas in 1927.

If Luckner had sailed on the Niobe at the age of thirteen, it would have been 1894 or early 1895. Until mid-1896 there was no Russian ship called Niobe. At this time Robert Steele of Greenock, Scotland, sold his ship Niobe to a Finnish company. (Finland was under Russian occupation, so the ship was considered Russian.)

The Niobe sailed from Hamburg in April 1897 bound for Australia. If Luckner sailed on this voyage, he would have been nearly sixteen years old. In Luckner's memoir, the Niobe's first port of call is Fremantle. But the Niobe did not call at Fremantle. She sailed directly to Melbourne.

=== Jack-of-all-trades ===
The memoir continues... Arriving at Fremantle, Western Australia, Luckner jumped ship and for seven years worked in a bewildering array of occupations: he was a seller of the Salvation Army's The War Cry; an assistant lightkeeper at the Cape Leeuwin Lighthouse in Augusta, Western Australia, a job he abandoned when he was discovered with the lighthouse keeper's daughter by her father; a kangaroo hunter; a circus worker; a professional boxer (due to his exceptional strength); a fisherman; a seaman; a guard in the Mexican Army for President Díaz, a railway construction worker, a barman, and a tavern keeper. He was incarcerated for a short time in a Chilean prison accused of stealing pigs, he twice suffered broken legs, and he was thrown out of a hospital in Jamaica for lack of money.

==== Was Luckner a lighthouse keeper? ====
A careful reading of the Lowell Thomas text shows that Luckner did not claim to be an assistant lightkeeper (an official job title) at Cape Leeuwin, but rather "an assistant to the lightkeeper".

The German version claims that Cape Leeuwin has 100-metre cliffs and the Cape Leeuwin lighthouse is 100 metres high. Neither is true. However, certain other aspects of Luckner's description of Cape Leeuwin do stand up to scrutiny, which suggests that he may have been there at some stage.

Luckner claims to have sailed on the German flagged ship Caesarea. The Caesarea called at Flinders Bay in July 1901 to load timber for Liverpool, England. At that time Flinders Bay was a timber port, and is approximately seven kilometres from Cape Leeuwin. This is probably when Luckner visited the Cape Leeuwin lighthouse, and was inspired to imagine himself as an employee there.

=== Back in Germany ===
At the age of twenty, Luckner entered a German navigation training school, where he passed the examinations for his mate's ticket. By 1908 he had joined the Hamburg-Südamerikanische Line steamer Petropolis, intending to serve for nine months before volunteering to serve in the Imperial German Navy for a year, to obtain a naval commission. He had vowed not to return to his family except in uniform and was eventually welcomed back by his family, who had given him up for lost. In February 1912 Luckner was finally called up by the navy and served on the gunboat SMS Panther.

== First World War ==
In the early months of the First World War Felix von Luckner saw action at the Battle of Heligoland Bight (1914). At the Battle of Jutland (1916) he commanded a gun turret on board the battleship Kronprinz.

At the beginning of the War, Germany converted a considerable number of merchant ships into merchant raiders by equipping them with guns and sending them in search of Allied merchant shipping. Most of the armed raiders were not particularly successful, but they did tie up considerable Allied forces in hunting them. By early 1915, most of the armed raiders had either been hunted down and sunk or else had run out of fuel and been interned in neutral ports.

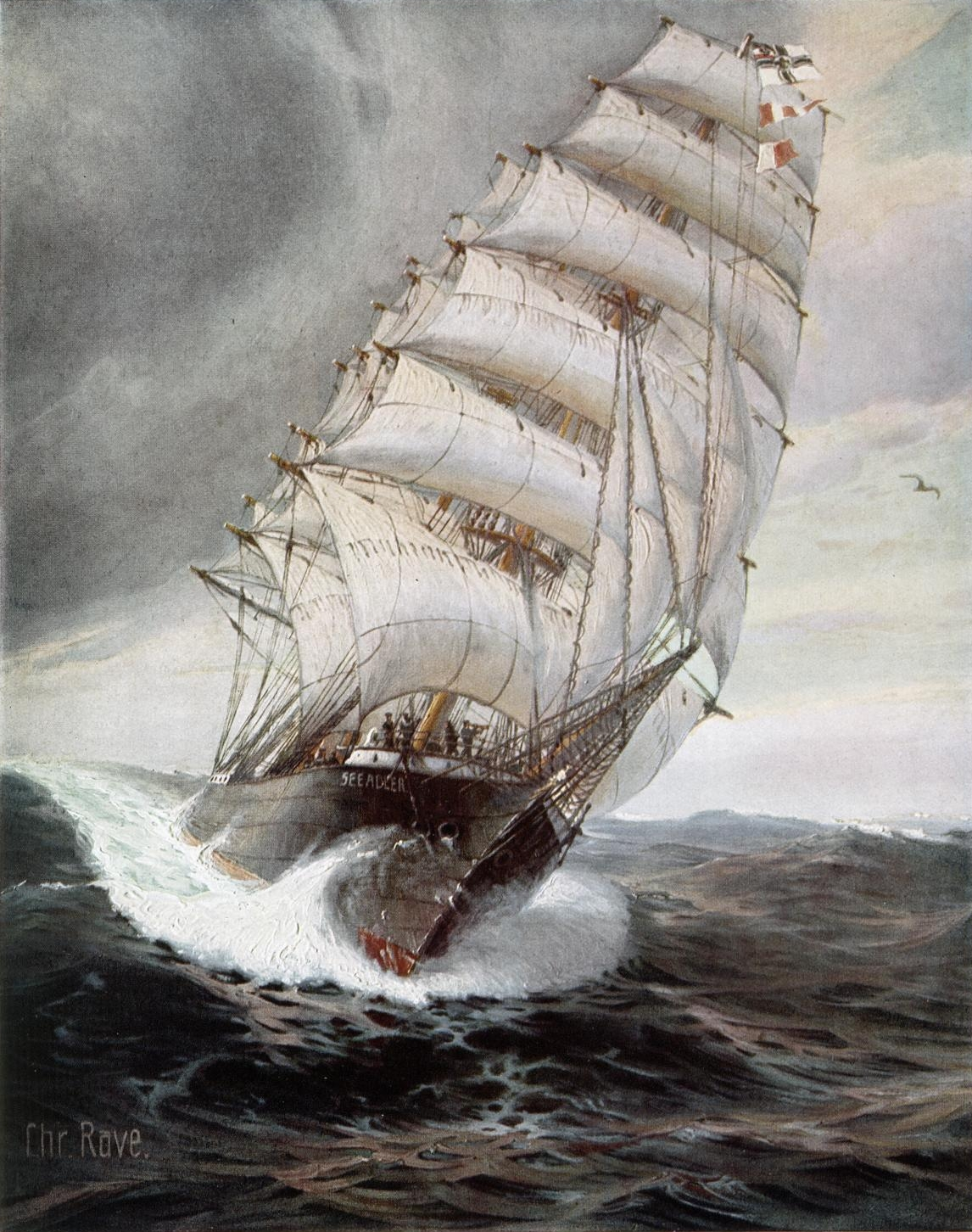
SMS Seeadler, the three-masted windjammer that raided the Atlantic and Pacific in an age of dreadnoughts (painting by Christopher Rave)

Hoping to revive commerce raiding, the Imperial Navy equipped the impounded three-masted sailing ship Pass of Balmaha (1,571 tons) with two 105 mm guns hidden behind hinged gunwales, several machine guns, and two carefully hidden 500 HP auxiliary engines. She was commissioned as the auxiliary cruiser Seeadler ("Sea Eagle"). As he was almost the only officer in the German Navy with extensive experience of large sailing ships, Luckner was appointed to command her.

=== The Voyage of Seeadler ===
==== Raider ====
Seeadler left port on 21 December 1916 and managed to slip through the British blockade disguised as a Norwegian ship. Many of the crew of six officers and 57 men, including Luckner himself, had been selected for their ability to speak Norwegian, in case they were intercepted by the British. By Christmas Day, Seeadler was southeast of Iceland, where she encountered the British armed merchant cruiser Avenger. Avenger put an inspection party aboard, but failed to detect the German deception.

On 9 January 1917, Seeadler came upon a single-funneled steamer, raised a signal requesting a time signal (not an uncommon thing for a sailing ship long out of contact with land to do), and raised the German ensign too late for the target ship to take any evasive action. Three shots were needed to persuade the 3,268 ton Gladys Royle, carrying coal from Cardiff to Buenos Aires, to heave to. Her crew was taken off unharmed, and she was scuttled.

The following day, Seeadler encountered another steamship, which refused to identify itself. The German ensign was raised and a shot fired across the bow of the Lundy Island, which was carrying sugar from Madagascar. The steamer still refused to heave to, and Luckner fired four rounds directly at her. The steamer then hove to and lowered her boats, but her captain ignored an order to come to Seeadler. A German boarding party was sent over and discovered that the crew had abandoned ship when the first shots were fired, leaving the captain alone on board. Captain Bannister later told Luckner that he had previously been captured by a German raider and had given his parole, which he had broken; thus, he was not anxious to be a prisoner of war again. Luckner continued his voyage southwards, and by 21 January he was in mid-Atlantic between Brazil and West Africa when he found the 2,199 ton French three-masted barque Charles Gounod, which was loaded with corn. She was quickly dispatched, but her log book recorded information about other ships she had met and their intended route.

On 24 January, the small 364-ton Canadian schooner Perce was met and sunk by machine gun fire, after taking off her crew and her captain's new bride. The 3,071 ton French four-master Antonin, which was loaded with Chilean saltpetre, was overhauled on 3 February and soon scuttled. On 9 February, the 1,811 ton Italian Buenos Aires, also carrying saltpetre, was sunk. On 19 February, a four-masted barque was spotted, which immediately piled on sail in an effort to get away; however, Seeadler's engines allowed her to overhaul the 2,431 ton British steamer Pinmore, which was carrying a cargo of grain. By coincidence, Luckner had himself sailed in Pinmore in his civilian sailing days, back in 1902. He took Pinmore into Rio de Janeiro in order to get more supplies, before eventually scuttling her.

The next ship to be stopped was the Danish barque Viking, but as there was nothing unusual about her cargo the neutral ship was allowed to proceed unmolested.

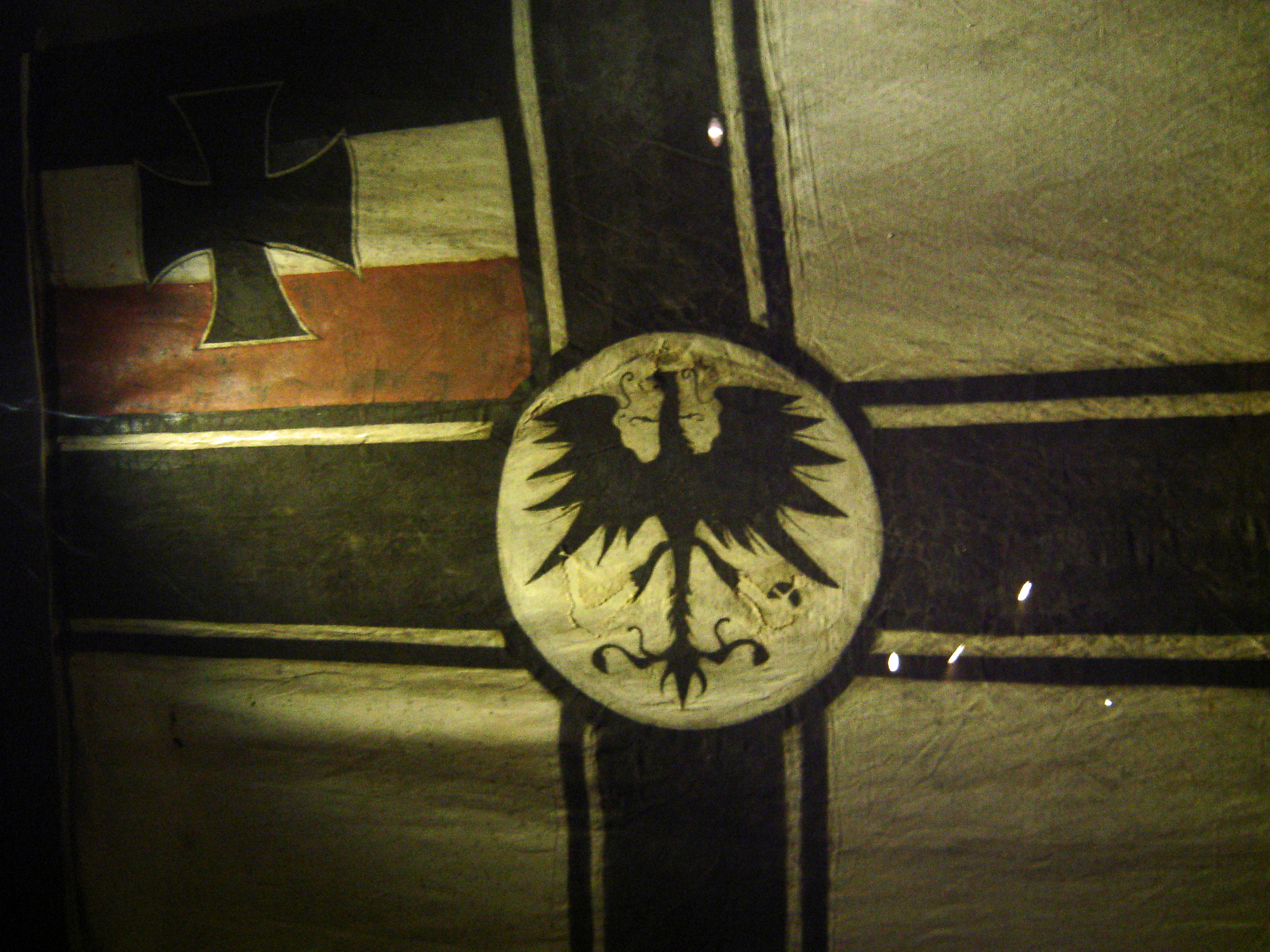
The ensign which Luckner would raise on the Seeadler to convey hostile intent is now on display at the Auckland War Memorial Museum.

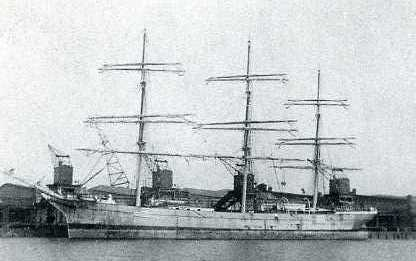
Pass of Balmaha later SMS Seeadler

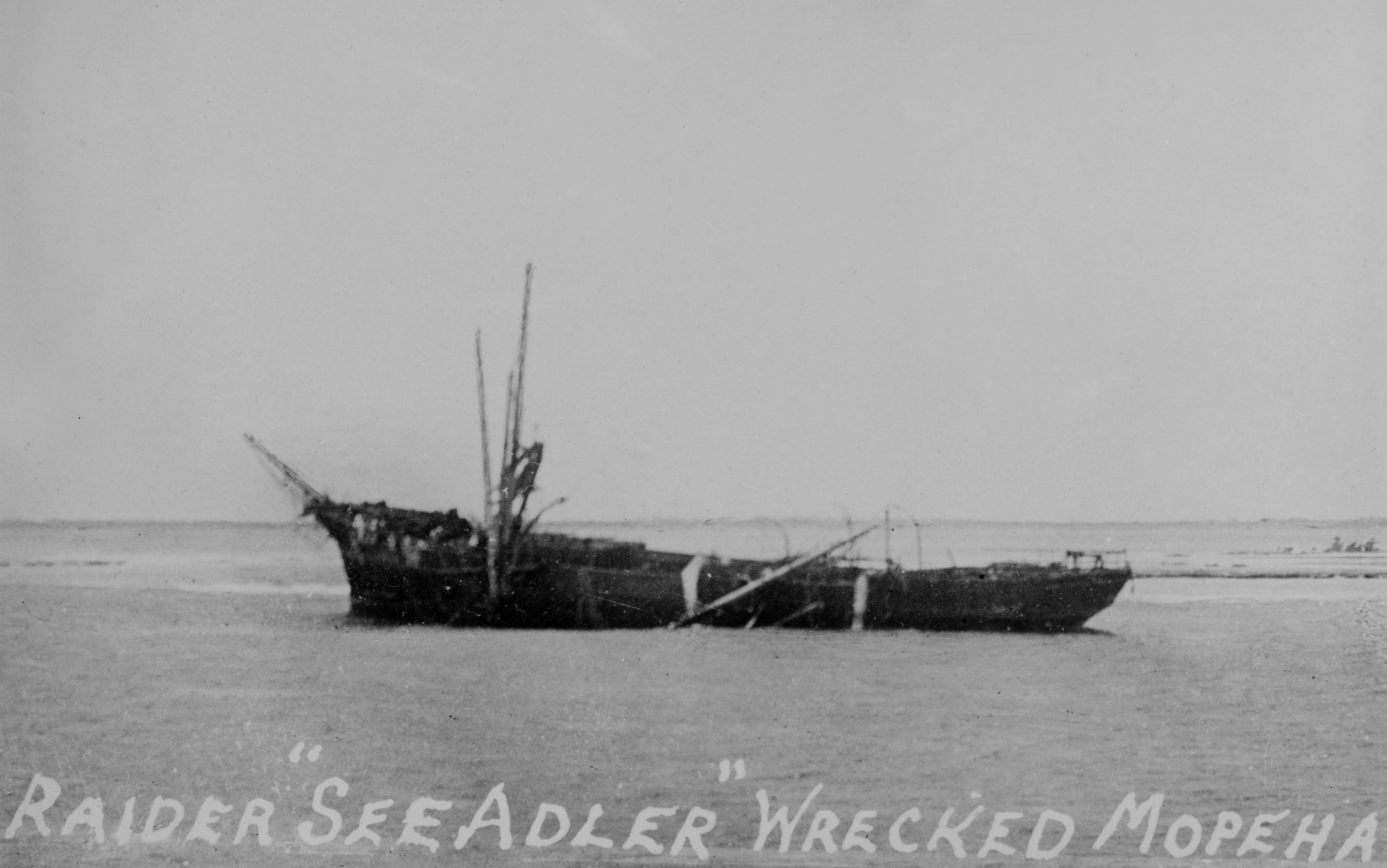
Seeadler wrecked

==== More victims ====
On the morning of 26 February 1917, the 1,953 ton British barque British Yeoman, carrying a welcome cargo including chickens and pigs, was stopped and sunk; the same evening the French four-master Le Rochefoucauld fell victim to the Seeadler. The boarding party discovered Le Rochefoucauld had only recently been stopped by a British cruiser which was looking for Seeadler.

On the evening of 5 March, Seeadler discovered a four-masted barque in the moonlight and signalled "Stop immediately! German Cruiser". Bizarrely, the captain of the 2,206 ton French ship Dupleix rowed across to Seeadler, convinced another French captain was playing a practical joke on him. He was soon disabused of the idea when his ship was scuttled. Seeadler's next victim on 10 March was asked for the time, but ignored the signal. Luckner ordered a smoke generator to be lit, and the 3,609 ton Horngarth turned back to render assistance to the 'burning' sailing ship. A single shot put the British ship's radio out of action; this resulted in the only loss of life in the Seeadler's voyage. A British sailor, Douglas Page, was killed when a steam pipe was ruptured by the shot. Horngarth was soon scuttled by Seeadler's now experienced crew.

By this time, Luckner had the problem of feeding and keeping safe nearly 300 prisoners, in addition to his own crew. Consequently, when on 20 March, the French four-masted barque Cambronne was captured, Luckner arranged for the ship's topgallant mast and additional spars and sails to be removed, before putting his prisoners aboard Cambronne under the command of Captain Mullen of Pinmore. The much-reduced rigging on Cambronne ensured Seeadler would be able to escape before her location could be reported to the hunting ships.

The Royal Navy was well aware of Seeadler's general location and set a trap consisting of the armed merchant cruisers Otranto and Orbita and the armoured cruiser HMS Lancaster at Cape Horn. However, a severe storm blew Seeadler considerably further south, before she entered the Pacific Ocean on 18 April and sailed north along the Chilean coast. By early June, Seeadler was east of Christmas Island and learned that the United States had entered the war. Seeadler therefore turned her attention to American shipping, sinking the 529-ton A. B. Johnson of San Francisco on 14 June, the 673 ton R. C. Slade the next day, and the schooner Manila on 8 July. By this time, Seeadler needed to be laid up so that her hull could be scraped clean. She put into the small island of Mopelia, also known as Maupihaa, a coral atoll some 10 km (6.2 mi) in diameter in the Society Islands, some 450 km (280 mi) from Tahiti.

==== Wrecking and stranding ====
Seeadler was too large to enter the sheltered lagoon of Mopelia, and consequently had to anchor outside the reef. On 2 August, disaster struck. According to Luckner, the ship was struck by a tsunami which wrecked her on the reef. However, some American prisoners alleged that the ship drifted aground while the prisoners and most of the crew were having a picnic on the island.

The crew and their 46 prisoners were now stranded on Mopelia, but they managed to salvage provisions, firearms, and two of the ship's boats.

=== Hide and seek ===
Luckner decided to sail with five of his men in one of the 10 m (32 ft 10 in) long open boats, rigged as a sloop and named Kronprinzessin Cecilie. Ever the optimist, he intended to sail to Fiji by way of the Cook Islands, capture a sailing ship, return to Mopelia for his crew and prisoners, and resume his raiding career.

Three days after leaving Mopelia, the seamen reached Atiu Island, where they pretended to be Dutch-American mariners crossing the Pacific for a bet. The New Zealand Resident, the administrator of the island, gave them enough supplies to reach another island in the group, Aitutaki, where they posed as Norwegians. The New Zealand Resident in Aitutaki was suspicious but had no means of detaining the group, and Luckner quickly took his party to the island of Rarotonga. Approaching Rarotonga in the dark, Luckner saw a dark ship which he thought was an auxiliary cruiser, but in fact it was a beached ship.

Luckner pressed on to the Fijian Wakaya Island, arriving after a voyage of 3,700 km (2,300 mi) in an open boat. Most people on Wakaya accepted the Germans' story of being shipwrecked Norwegians, but one sceptic called a party of police from the old Fijian capital of Levuka. On 21 September, the police threatened that a non-existent gun on the inter-island ferry Amra would blow Luckner out of the water. Not wishing to cause bloodshed, and not realizing the police were unarmed, Luckner and his party surrenderedHe was detained in Suva for 7 day. It is said that he had slept with a Kailoma(Part European) Woman, who brought him his food and was the daughter of the Local Police Chief, The woman gave birth to a Son months later. They were moved and confined in a prisoner-of-war camp on Motuihe Island, off Auckland, New Zealand.

Meanwhile, back on Mopelia, a small French trading ship, the Lutèce, anchored outside the reef. Leutnant Kling of Seeadler, having heard on the radio of his captain's capture, sailed out to Lutèce and captured her at gunpoint. The French crew was put ashore with the other prisoners, and all the Germans embarked on the ship, which they renamed the Fortuna, and set course for South America. The master of A. B. Johnson, Captain Smith, then took the remaining open boat from Mopelia with three other American seamen, and sailed 1,600 km (990 mi) to Pago Pago, arriving on 4 October, where they were finally able to inform the authorities of the activities of Seeadler and arrange for the rescue of the other 44 sailors left stranded on Mopelia.

Fortuna, meanwhile, came to grief when she struck uncharted rocks off Easter Island. The crew scrambled ashore, where they were interned by the Chileans for the remainder of the war.

=== Escape ===
Luckner still refused to accept that the war was over for him. The commander of the prisoner of war camp at Motuihe had a fast motor boat, the Pearl, at his disposal, and on 13 December 1917, Luckner faked setting up a play for Christmas with his men and used his provisions for the play to plan his escape. He and other prisoners seized the Pearl and made for the Coromandel Peninsula. Using a machine gun, Luckner then seized the 90-ton scow Moa and, with the help of a handmade sextant and a map copied from a school atlas, he sailed for the Kermadec Islands, which contained a castaway depot on Curtis Island. A pursuing auxiliary ship, the Iris, had guessed Luckner's probable destination and caught up with him on 21 December. A year after his mission began, the war finally ended for Felix von Luckner. He spent the remainder of the war in various prisoner of war camps in New Zealand, including Ripapa Island in Lyttelton Harbour, before being repatriated to Germany in 1919.

== Personal life ==
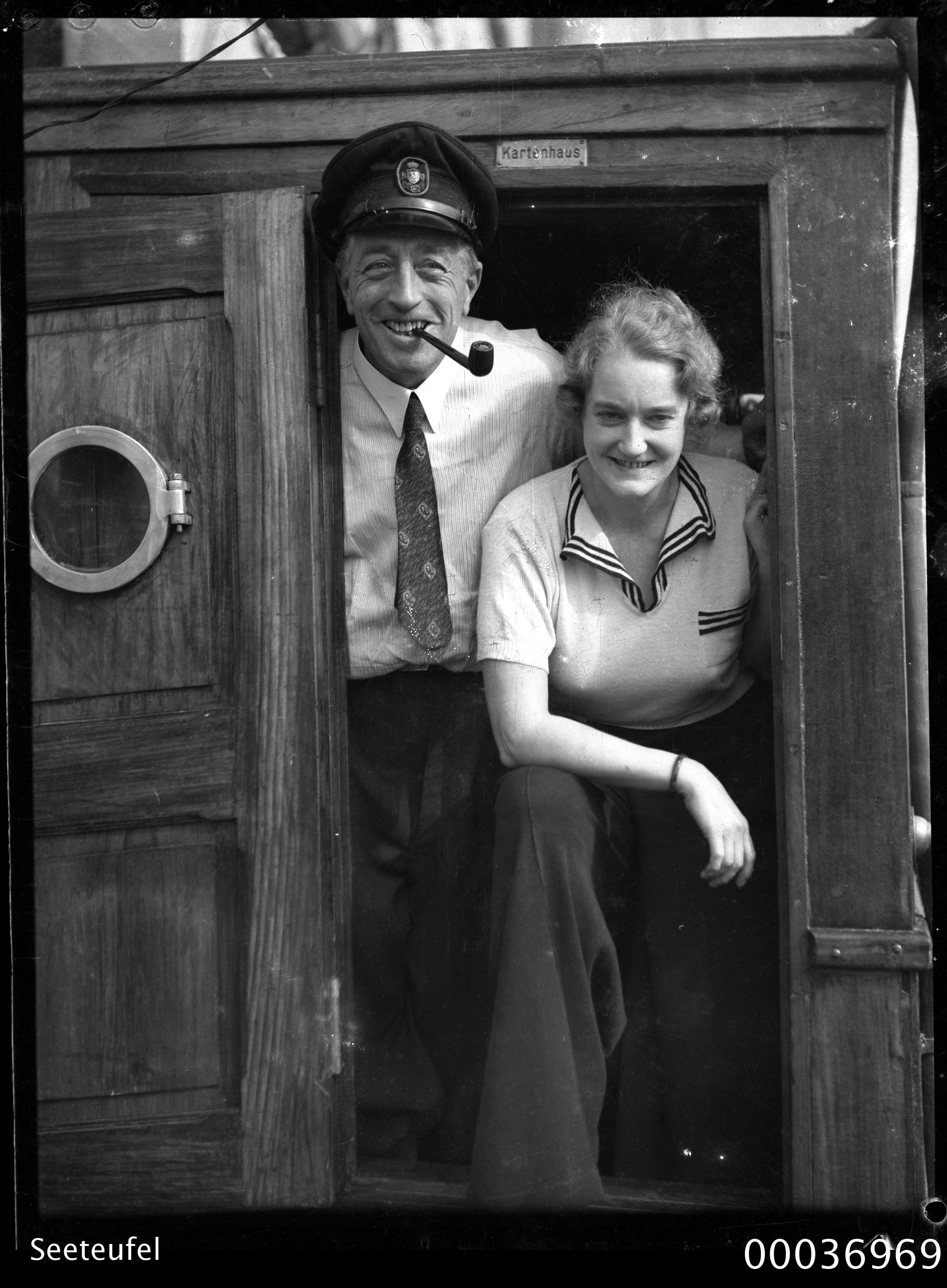
Luckner with his wife Ingeborg in Sydney during his goodwill trip to Australia, 1938

Luckner was married twice. He married Petra Schultz from Hamburg, with whom he had a daughter, Inge-Maria, born in 1913. They were divorced in 1914. On 24 September 1924 he married Ingeborg Engeström in Malmö, Sweden.

== Postwar life ==
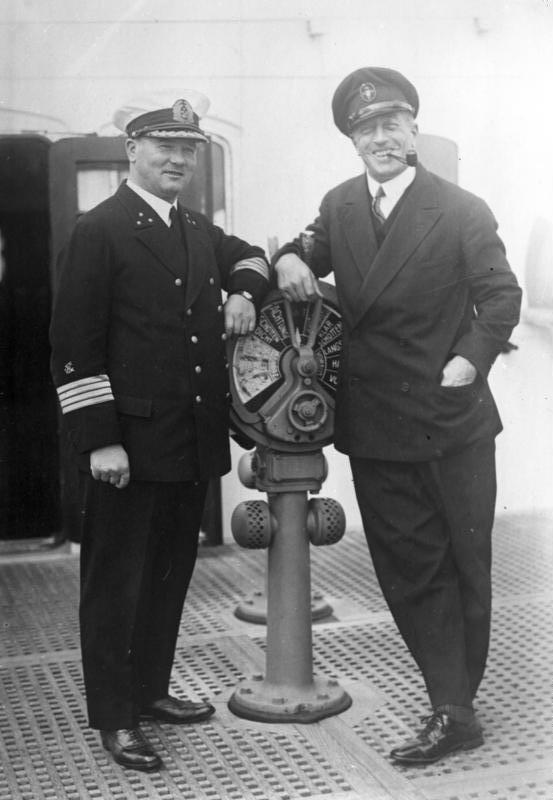
Luckner with captain Leopold Ziegenbein in Bremen, 1930

On 12 May 1921, Luckner joined Regular Freemasonry of the Lodge Zur goldenen Kugel (Große Landesloge von Deutschland) in Hamburg. He wrote a book about his wartime adventures which became a bestseller in Germany, and a book about him by Lowell Thomas spread his fame throughout the Anglosphere.

In 1926 Luckner raised funds to buy a sailing ship which he called the Vaterland and he set out on a goodwill mission around the world, leaving Bremen on 19 September and arriving in New York Harbor on 22 October 1926. An entertaining speaker, he was widely admired for his seamanship and for having fought his war at sea with such a minimal loss of life. This opened many doors for him in the United States, where he spoke on hundreds of occasions across the country, both in German and later, increasingly, in English. He won the support of many notable people, including diplomats, politicians, and even World War I veterans belonging to the American Legion. Henry Ford presented Luckner with a motor car, and the city of San Francisco made him an honorary citizen. US President Calvin Coolidge wanted to meet him, but Luckner politely declined at the request of Foreign Office of the Weimar Republic. Feeling that his "goodwill mission", as he called it in his travelogue, Seeteufel erobert Amerika ("Sea-devil conquers America"), could neither have greater success elsewhere, nor could he be financially sustained by the income as a speaker, however popular and successful, he returned to Germany, where he arrived on 19 April 1928.

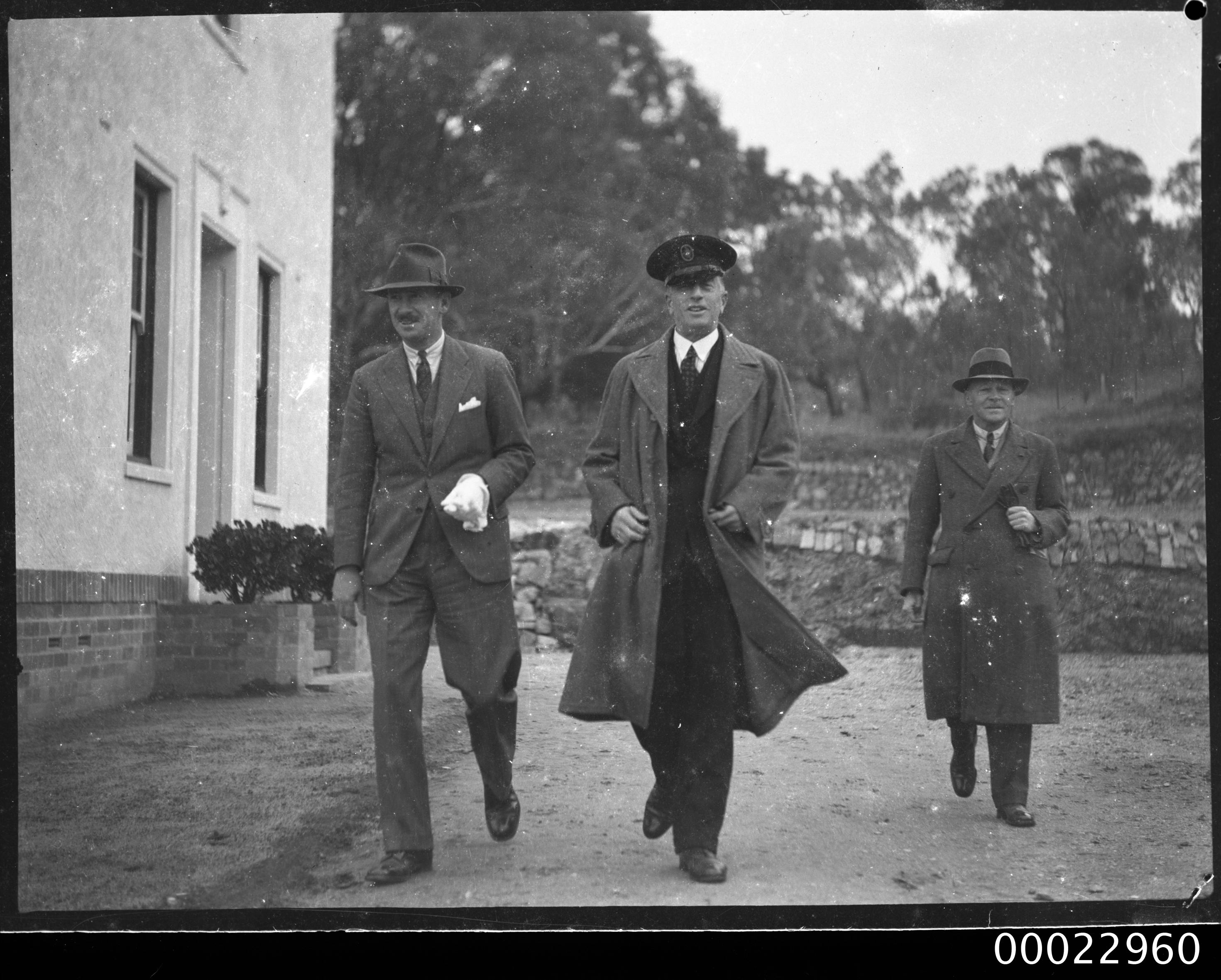
Luckner visiting the Royal Military College of Duntroon, 1938

Count von Luckner was a family friend and frequent visitor to the Heydrich family, who belonged to the Catholic minority in Halle. At their household, Count Luckner's stories about the cruise of SMS Seeadler inspired one of their sons, a young Reinhard Heydrich, to enlist as an officer cadet in the inter-war Reichsmarine of the Weimar Republic, from which he was dishonourably discharged for "conduct unbecoming an officer and a gentleman" in 1931. In 1937 and 1938, Luckner and his wife undertook a round-the-world voyage in his yacht Seeteufel, and they were welcomed in New Zealand and Australia, although some viewed him as an apologist for the Nazi regime and for this reason, Luckner became a target for anti-German propaganda by the Australian press.

For example, Count von Luckner had great physical strength and was noted for his ability to bend coins between the thumb, index, and middle finger of his right hand and to tear up telephone directories (the thickest being that of New York City), with his bare hands. For this reason, on the occasion of his visit to Australia in 1938, the Sydney Labor Daily published a cartoon showing Kaiser Wilhelm tearing up the Belgian Neutrality Pact, Adolf Hitler tearing up another agreement, and Luckner tearing up a telephone directory, with the caption "They All Have the Habit".

During their visit to Queensland, Australia, the Luckners were feted by the press and public. The Brisbane office of the Commonwealth Investigation Branch (CIB), maintained a surveillance of the Luckners during their visit, with the inspector in charge of the CIB in Brisbane, Bob Wake, attending a gala function arranged by the German Foreign Office in honour of the couple. The gala menu was decorated with a swastika. The CIB kept detailed records of all of their contacts, and when Australia declared war on Germany many of these contacts were arrested and interned.

During the Second World War, Adolf Hitler tried to exploit Luckner for propaganda purposes, although as a Freemason Luckner was not in one of the Nazis' favoured groups of people. Luckner refused to renounce his membership in "the Craft" or the various honorary citizenships granted in the US, and consequently he suffered by having his bank accounts frozen. In 1943, Count von Luckner saved the life of a German Jewish woman, Rose Janson, whom he provided with a passport he found on a bombsite, and which allowed her to subsequently escape to the United States via a neutral country. Towards the end of the war in April, Count von Luckner was living in Halle, where he was briefly placed under guard by the 414th Infantry Regiment of the United States Army, which was engaged in house-to-house fighting against Wehrmacht and Waffen-SS troops within the town after the garrison refused to surrender. Count Luckner did not return to the town after hearing that local Nazis planned to subject him to execution without trial.

Luckner was a prolific autograph signer, and his original autographs turn up frequently at auctions and estate sales.

After the Second World War, Luckner moved to Sweden, where he lived in Malmö with his Swedish second wife Ingeborg Engeström until his death in Malmö at the age of 84 in 1966. However, his body was returned to Germany and was buried in the Main Cemetery Ohlsdorf, Hamburg.

== Writing ==
Luckner wrote the introduction for Alfred von Niezychowski's book The Cruise of the Kronprinz Wilhelm, 1928, published by Doubleday & Company, about his time on the auxiliary cruiser Kronprinz Wilhelm.

== TV series ==
Between 1973 and 1975, a Franco-German Co-production company produced a 39-episode adventure series entitled "Graf Luckner" for the German ARD television network, featuring Luckner as the hero. The French sub-title was "Les Aventures du Capitaine Luckner".

Episode 26 of the television series Tales from Te Papa featured the sextant used by Luckner in his attempt to escape from captivity in New Zealand.

== The Count Felix von Luckner Society ==
On 29 March 2004 the society "Felix Graf von Luckner Gesellschaft" was founded in Halle, with the objective of commemorating Luckner's life and work, especially his role in safeguarding the city of Halle in April 1945. The society also wishes to create a memorial and museum for Luckner in Halle and to restore his yacht Seeteufel, which is currently in poor condition and lying in Russia. Within a few months of its creation, the society had over 100 members in 14 countries.

== Bibliography ==
- Allen, Oliver E. and the editors of Time-Life Books. 1978. Captain Sea Devil of the "Seeadler". The Windjammers pp. 120–143. (The Seafarers, vol. 6.) Alexandria, VA: Time-Life Books.
- Bade, James, N. Von Luckner: A Reassessment. Count Felix von Luckner in New Zealand and the South Pacific. 1917–1919-and 1938. Peter Lang GMBH, Frankfurt am Main, 2004.
- Bohse, Daniel & Sperk, Alexander, Legende, Opportunist, Selbstdarsteller: Felix Graf Luckner und seine Zeit in Halle (Saale) 1919–1945, Mitteldeutscher Verlag, 2015.
- Bromby, Robin, German Raiders of the South Seas, Doubleday. Sydney and Auckland. 1985.
- Cowan, James, "The Pirate of the Pacific: German Naval Officer's daring Escape from his Prison Island and Recapture in Mid-Ocean," The Wide World Magazine, July 1918. pp. 253–260.
- Davis, E. H. "The Man Who Met Von Luckner: True Story of an Encounter with the Seeadler", The World News, 25 June 1938, pp. 7 and 40–41.
- Frankenstein, Norbert von, "Seeteufel" Felix Graf Luckner: Wahrheit und Legende, Hamburg, SSC-Verlag 1997.
- Fraser, Eleanor, "Count Felix von Luckner and the ' Pinmore', Sea Breezes 66, 1992, pp. 772–776.
- Gardiner, Robert (editorial director), Conway's All the World's Fighting Ships 1906–1921. Conway Maritime Press, London 1985.
- Henry, Howard, "The Sea Devil came Calling" --- Count von Luckner and his visit to Aitutaki: August/September 1917. Sovereign Pacific Publishing Company, Auckland, 2001.
- Hoyt, Edwin. P., Sea Eagle (alternative title: Count von Luckner: Knight of the Sea) David McKay Co Inc, New York, NY, 1969.
- Irving, Terry and Rowan Cahill, Radical Sydney: Places, Portraits and Unruly Episodes, UNSW Press, Sydney, 2010, pp. 223–230.
- Luckner, Felix von, Seeteufel erobert Amerika, Koehler & Amelang, Leipzig, 1928.
- Luckner, Felix von, Aus dem Leben des 'Seeteufels' , edited by Wolfgang Seilkopf, Mitteldeutscher Verlag, Halle, 2000.
- Luckner, Felix von, Ein Freibeuterleben, Woldni & Lindeke, Dresden, 1938.
- Luckner, Felix von, Out of an Old Sea Chest, trans. by Edward Fitzgerald, Methuen, London, 1958.
- Luckner, Felix von, Seeteufel: Abenteuer aus meinem Leben, Koehler, Berlin and Leipzig, 1926, (first published 1921).
- Luckner, Felix von, Seeteufels Weltfahrt: Alte und neue Abenteuer, Bertelsmann (Gutersloh) 1951.
- McGill, David, Island of Secrets: Matiu/Somes Island in Wellington Harbour, Steele Roberts & Silver Owl Press, Wellington, 2001.
- Newbolt, Henry, History of the Great War Based on Official Documents: Naval Operations, Vol IV, Longmans Green and Co, London. 1928.
- Pardoe, Blaine The Cruise of the Sea Eagle: The Amazing True Story of Imperial Germany's Gentleman Pirate The Lyons Press, 2005, ISBN 1-59228-694-1.
- Ruffell, W. "The Search for Von Luckner, Part 1", The Volunteers: New Zealand Military Historical Journal, Vol.5, no.5, pp. 14–20.
- Ruhen, Carl, The Sea Devil: the Controversial Cruise of the Nazi Emissary von Luckner to Australia and New Zealand in 1938. Kangaroo Press, Kenthurst, 1988.
- Schmalenbach, Paul German Raiders: A History of Auxiliary Cruisers of the German Navy, 1895–1945. Naval Institute Press, 1979, ISBN 0-87021-824-7.
- Seilkopf, Wolfgang, Graf Luckner der Seeteufel/Count Luckner the Sea Devil: Eine Biografie in Bildern / A Biography in Pictures, Mitteldeutscher Verlag, 2012.
- Thomas, Lowell, Count Luckner the Sea Devil, Garden City Publishing Company, Inc, Garden City, New York, 1927.
- Thomas, Lowell, The Sea Devil. The Story of C. Felix v. Luckner, the German War Raider. New York: Doubleday, Page & Company,1927; London: William Heinemann 1927.
- Wake, Valdemar Robert (2004). No Ribbons or Medals: The story of 'Hereward', an Australian counter espionage officer. Mitcham, South Australia, Australia: Jacobyte Books. ISBN 1-74100-165-X.ISBN 9781741001655 available from Digital Print, South Australia.
- Thomas, Lowell, The Sea Devil's Fo'c'sle New York: Doubleday, Doran & Company, Inc. 1929.
- Tichener, Paul, The Von Luckner Incident, Lodestar Press, Auckland, 1978.
- Walter, John, The Kaiser's Pirates, German Surface Raiders in World War One, Arms and Armour Press, London, 1994.
- Yarwood, Vaughan, The History Makers: Adventures in New Zealand Biography. Random House New Zealand. Auckland, 2002.
- Alain Dunoyer de Segonzac, "Luckner, l'aigle des mers", Magazine "Chasse-marée", n°40, March 1989.
- Patrick de Gmeline and Josephine Sinclair, "Lückner l'aigle des mers" published by Lavauzelle publishers, France, illustrated with paintings (first and fourth covers) and drawings from the French painter Claude Le Baube, September 1985.
