= Guy le Baube =

Franco-American fashion and art photographer, born 1944

- Pronunciation: Gee Le Bob
- Born: 1944 (age 81–82)
- Citizenship: American

Guy Le Baube (born 1944) is a Franco-American fashion and art photographer. He was born in France and moved from Paris to New York in 1976. His work has appeared in magazines such as Vogue, Harper's Bazaar, Elle, and Marie Claire. Guy Le Baube is the son of the French painter Claude Le Baube.

== Exhibitions ==
- July, 2021- "Art is Life" Avant Gallery, New York City, USA
- July, 2019- "Behind the Scenes" Avant Gallery, New York City, USA
- Opera Gallery, Manhattan, United States of America
- August,2019 -Avant Gallery, New York, USA
- 2012 -Art Paris
- August, 2008-Opera Gallery, Monaco
- March, 2006- Miami, Florida, USA
- November, 2005- Geneva
- August, 2005-Gstaad

== Notable Artwork ==
- Rue Bois Le Vent, 1971
- Le sommier, 1977
- Culotte, 1978
- Wool, 1979
- Canape, 1979
- Reading,1986
- St. Jean Cap Ferrat, 1986
- Tea or coffee, 1990
- Donald Duck, 1990
- Shaving Smoking, 1994
- Rachel Cooking, 1994
- Bust, 1994
- War widow, 1997
- Bomb, 1999
- Window, 2002
- Dogs, 2002
- Loving Mom, 2002
- Love, 2002
- Afternoon, 2002
- Eyelashes, 2005
- Tattoo, 2007
- Fishnet, 2007
- Ready Made French Maid, 2007
- Readymade swimmer, 2008
- Readymade French navy, 2008
- Ascenseur social, 2010
- Hommage à Delacroix Liberté, 2011
- Crazyhorse private show 1, 2011
- Crazyhorse private show 5, 2011
- Titanic Resurrected, 2012
- Iceskater, 2012
- Marines, 2013
- Cupidon, 2013
- Flamingo Spear, 2013
- Mari Rouge, 2013
