= Ryazan (inhabited locality) =

Ryazan (Russian: Рязань) is the name of several inhabited localities in Russia.

Urban localities

- Ryazan, a city in Ryazan Oblast

Rural localities

- Ryazan, Arkhangelsk Oblast, a village in Nikolsky Selsoviet of Vilegodsky District in Arkhangelsk Oblast
- Ryazan, Moscow Oblast, a village in Nikolskoye Rural Settlement of Odintsovsky District in Moscow Oblast; 55°40′N 36°40′E
- Ryazan, Smolensk Oblast, a village in Frunzenskoye Rural Settlement of Dorogobuzhsky District in Smolensk Oblast
- Ryazan, Tver Oblast, a village in Tsentralnoye Rural Settlement of Kimrsky District in Tver Oblast
- Ryazan, Vologda Oblast, a village in Korotovsky Selsoviet of Cherepovetsky District in Vologda Oblast
