= Claude Le Baube =

French painter

Claude Le Baube (1919–2007) was a painter and sea captain.

== Career ==
His works consist primarily of landscapes painted on location, as well as realistic historical naval scenes characterized by detailed execution and the use of both hands. His paintings also include still lifes with varied imagery. His oeuvre reflects his knowledge of the maritime world, his travels, and his interest in landscape painting.

Born into a family of artists (he was the maternal grandson of two recognized painters Hortense Dury-Vasselon Grand Prix de Rome and Marius Vasselon, and the paternal grandson of Victor Le Baube, painter/sculptor), he began to draw at a very early age (his parents Marthe Vasselon and Robert Le Baube were themselves exceptional at drawing). The novels of Jules Verne (and the illustrations contained in the Hetzel book collection) left a profound mark on him in his childhood, and as a result they would be a longstanding source of inspiration. He studied at the Ecole des Beaux Arts.

== Family ==
Le Baube was the father of the photographer Guy le Baube and the uncle of the painter Guillaume Le Baube.

== Books and illustrations ==
- 1945: Watercolor illustrations of Aux Postes de combat by A. Truffert, relating the battles of the French Navy vessels of Free France.
- 1946: Illustrated the first and second covers of N° 22 of the "Marine Nationale" magazine.
- April 1947: Illustrated the first and second covers of N° 30 of the "Marine Nationale mer et outre-mer" magazine.
- 1978: Illustrated "Rayon vert au Cap Horn" by the solo navigator Loïck Fougeron, published by Pen Duick.
- 1981–1983: Illustrated '"Histoire de la Marine" published by Lavauzelle.
- 1982: Text and illustrations of a book on lighthouses (in the account of the sea cruises of the Paquet Cruisers Company).
- 1983: Illustrated the la cover of "les oubliés du bout du monde" The Journal of a sailor in Indochina from 1939 to 1946, Romé, Maritimes et d'outre-mer publications. Illustration in the magazine “ça m'intéresse,” oil painting related to the loss of the Sheffield.
- 1984: illustrated the cover of "l'aventure héroïque des sous-marins français 1939-1945" (Heroic ventures of French Submarines) by Jean-Jacques Antier, Maritimes et d'outre-mer publications.
- 1985: illustrated "L'aigle des mers" (See Adler) by Felix von Luckner, published by Lavauzelle. Illustrated the cover of "Tonnerre sur la Corse" (Thunder on Corsica) by Jean-Victor Angelini, maritime et d'outre-mer publications.
- 1992: illustrated the cover of ”l'Histoire de la Marine”, tome 2 de la vapeur à l'atome" (from steam to nuclear) by Philippe Masson, Lavauzelle publishers.
- 2007: illustrated, with a double-paged oil painting, the article "une victoire oubliée, la bataille de Koh Chang" in "champs de bataille thématique" n°1, April 2007.
- June 2007: publication of six drawings, paintings, and aquarelles in Carré Voiles n°9, a quarterly magazine dedicated to sailing, to illustrate a biographical article dedicated to him. See: magazine website and the summary of the issue in question.

== Exhibitions ==
- 1954, "la Palette du Tertre" Gallery, Casablanca, Morocco.
- 1956, “Galerie du Vieux Port” Marseille.
- 1956, Grand Prix de “La Danse et de l’Opéra” the little flutist, Marseille
- 1957, “Galerie Nègre” Marseille.
- 1958, “Galerie Chardin” Paris.
- 1959, Grand Prix du Palais Royal, presided over by Jean Cocteau.
- 1960, Galerie Alain le Breton, Marseille. Prize for new painting, "Ville de Marseille".
- 1961, “Galerie le Breton”, Marseille.
- 1965, "Les amis des arts", Aix-en-Provence.
- 1966, Avignon.
- 1970, “Galerie Aldebert”, Basel.
- 1971, Galerie "le Moulin Autran", Nyons
- 1972, Galerie "les Amis des Arts", Aix-en-Provence
- 1975, Honorary invitation to the salon Sauveterre du Gard
- 1976, “Galerie André Nègre”, Marseille.
- 1978, Two exhibitions aboard the liner Mermoz; followed in November
- 1978, exhibited at the “Salon d'Automne” in Paris
- 1980, “Salon d'Automne”, Paris
- 1983, Galerie Grossi, Apt
- 1988, Galerie "le moulin Autran", Nyons
- 1989, Galerie"l'hôtel de Wicque", Pezenas.
- 1990, Galerie “Feille”
- 1992, Honorary invitation to the Festival de Thonon
- 1995, Galerie"l'hôtel de Wicque”, Pezenas.
- 1997, Galerie Grossi, Apt
- 2000, Exhibition in Tokyo. Among the sale, Tokyo Museum acquired one of them.
- 2001, Exhibition in Pouzilhac; exhibition at the Musée de Fréjus : first prize, for the Marines.
- 2002, Aix-en-Provence
- 2003, Musée de Fréjus; galerie Grossi, Apt.

== Past sales in galleries ==
- 7/11/1960 : Michel Boscher study, Paris Drouot : n°75, "le phare", 38 × 65 cm.
- 4/10/1998 : Vue de Singapour, circa 1940, aquarelle on paper, 42 × 60 cm.
- 28/10/2000, L'étude de Provence : "Cuirassés naviguant de nuit” oil on canvas, 33×46 cm.
- 28/10/2000, L'étude de Provence : "Cuirassés naviguant de nuit” oil on canvas, 33×46 cm.
- 2/07/2001, Auction commissionaire Neret-Minet : La corvette l'Aimable Marie devant le port de Gorée, circa 1950, oil on canvas, 64 × 100 cm
- 15/12/2001, Auction commissionaire Neret-Minet, "Le Suffren et le Leygues", oil on canvas, 50×73 cm (19 5/8 × 28 3/4 in).
- 14-7-2004 : Caravelles, aquarelle on paper, 48 × 70 cm. 19/3/2006 : African landscape painted on the bridge of a boat, oil on canvas, 34 × 46 cm.
- 20-8-2006 : Vaisseaux, aquarelle on paper, 44,2 × 27,9 cm.
- 9-12-06 : Le Soleil royal à la Hougue, oil on canvas, 60 × 81 cm. 20/9/2007, Tajan : "Trois mâts au mouillage", oil on canvas, 60×72 cm.
- 9-12-06 : "Vaisseaux de la compagnie des Indes au port Saint-Louis" - 50×73 cm. -
- 9-12-06, Auction commisionaire Leclere (Marseille - France)"La tour de Babel à marée basse" - huile sur toile (tableau crée en 2005 ?) - 55 × 46 cm.
- 24-06-07, Auction commisionaire Lesieur-Lebars, (Le Havre - France), "Trois mâts" - oil on panel - 60 × 102 cm.
- 20-09-07, Auction commisionaire Tajan, "Trois mâts au mouillage - oil on canvas - 60 × 72 cm.
- 02-02-08 : "Trois mâts" - oil on canvas.
- 12-06-08 : "La plage du Pouliguen à contre-jour" - oil on canvas - 35×55 cm (13,8×21,7 in).
