= Nelson Garrison Band =

New Zealand military brass band

The Nelson Garrison Band was a military brass band in the New Zealand Army that served the citizens of the city of Nelson in the eastern shores of Tasman Bay. It was one of 5 garrison bands in the New Zealand Army and is considered by many to be the country's first brass band. Its legacy is retained today through the Nelson City Band. During its existence, the band had served as the premier brass band in the city of Nelson, often working with other brass bands such as the Nelson Citizen's Silver Band.

== History ==
The band has roots in bands that date back to 1857 and 1841. These bands were formed by early settlers to the city and later came under the control of the regular army. It was formed as an army band 1873, being originally known as the Artillery Band. It took part in notable events related to the community. In late April 1888, in the presence of about 250 citizens, the band took part in the opening of the Nelson Athletic Ground Company. That same year, the band was dissolved, with another Garrison Band being formed in 1890, and Fred House serving as conductor. As it was attached to volunteer force units, there few regulations on the structure of bands. From 1901 to 1903, the band was led by Charles Trussell, during which he had composed the Alexandra Dance. and the march Joys of Life (the latter for the national band contest held in New Plymouth). It moved into the building of the Nelson Provincial Council in 1903. The band led a farewell parade in December 1939 for troops being deployed during the Second World War. In 1964, the number of army bands was reduced to seven, with the Nelson Garrison Band being one of them in order to create a larger New Zealand Army Band. It later changed its name to the Nelson Municipal Band and the Nelson City Brass throughout the latter half of the 20th century.

== Notable people ==
- George Page – Mayor of Nelson from 1935 to 1941.
- Charles Trussell, bandmaster of the band from 1901 to 1903.
- Maurice Abrahams, bandmaster of the band from 1956 to 1964.
- Alfred Oakley, director of the band in the 1870s.
- Herr Julius Lemmer, former bandmaster and principal of the Nelson School of Music.
