= Mercadante =

Mercadante is an Italian surname. Notable people with the surname include:

- Aloizio Mercadante (born 1954), Brazilian economist and politician
- Antonio Mercadante (1962–2018), Italian art historian and critic
- Lorenzo Mercadante (fl. 15th century), French sculptor
- Rafael Mercadante (born 1973), Mexican television host
- Saverio Mercadante (1795–1870), Italian opera composer
