= Marius Vasselon =

French painter

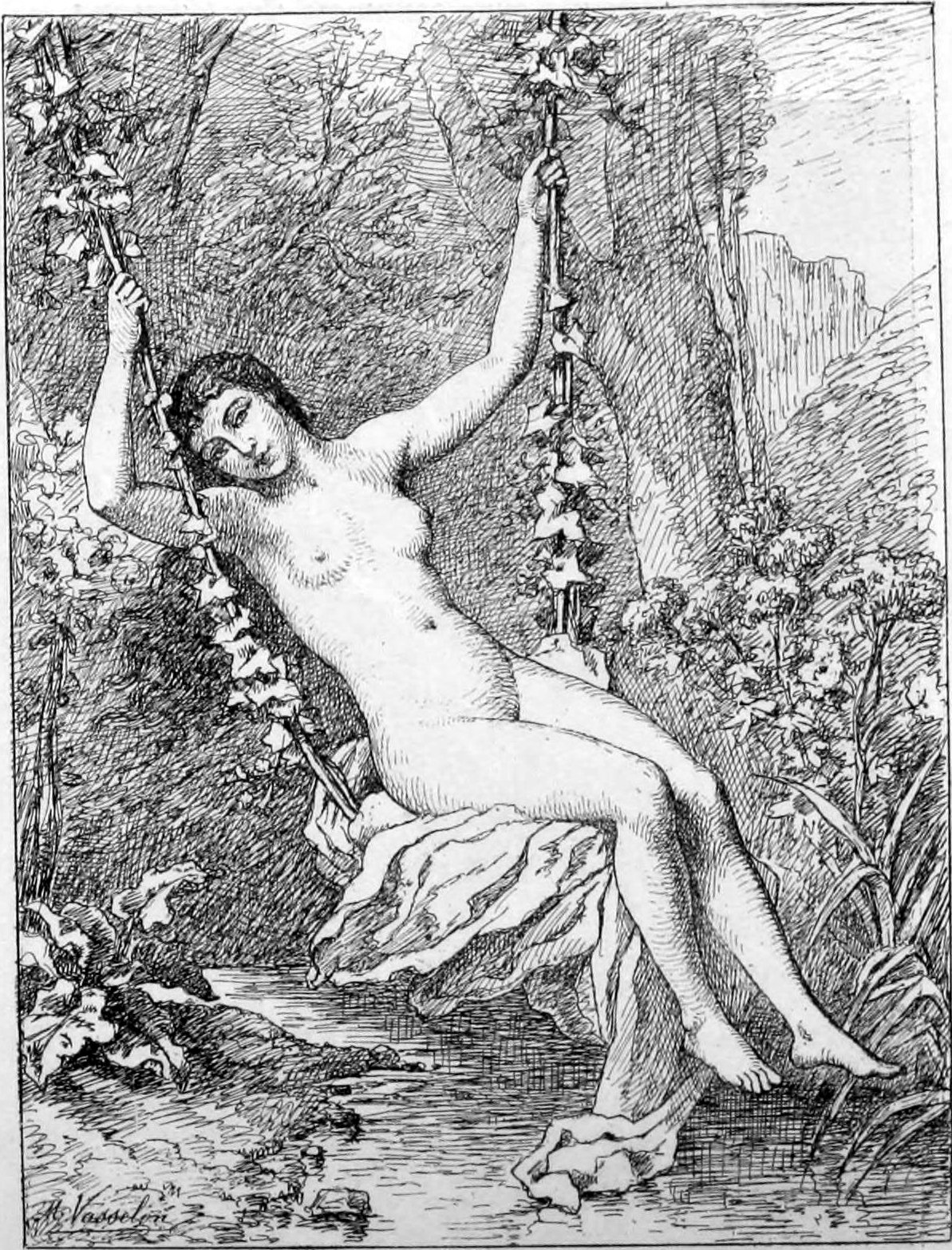
Marius Vasselon, Sarah the bather

Marius Vasselon (1841–1924) was a French painter. He was the son of the painter Edouard Vasselon (1814–1884) and the brother of the painter Alice Vasselon. He would have been educated under Leon Bonnat and Dessurgey. His works consists mostly of landscapes painted on location, still lifes, murals, nudes and portraits.

He was married with Hortense Dury-Vasselon who was a painter specialized in flowers.

The couple had three children (Gabrielle, Jeanne and Marthe - Claude Le Baube's mother). The three girls learned drawing and painting and they used to exhibit at the Salon until the beginning of World War I.
