= Band of the Royal Regiment of New Zealand Artillery =

Volunteer Military Band from New Zealand

- Volunteer Military Band affiliated to 16 Field Regiment New Zealand Artillery
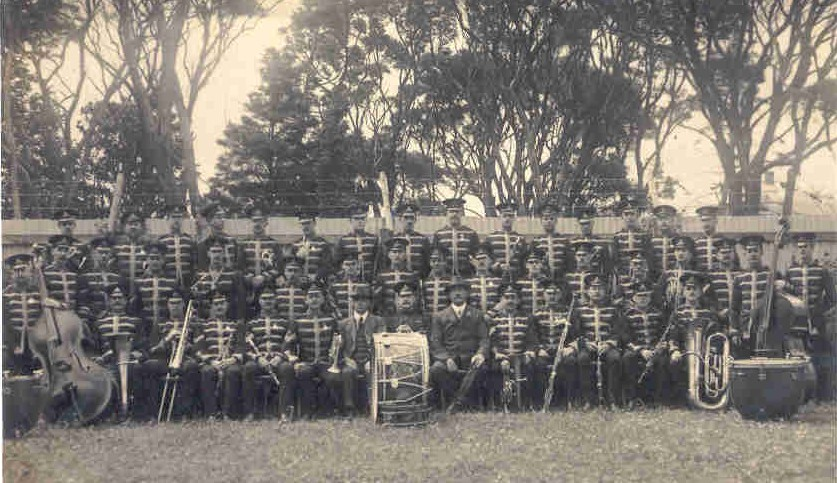
- Band in 1912
- Short name: Royal NZ Artillery Band
- Founded: 1864
- Location: Panmure, Auckland
- Music director: WO1 Steven Booth (2015 - )
- Website: https://www.rnzartilleryband.co.nz/

The Band of the Royal Regiment of New Zealand Artillery (abbreviated to Royal NZ Artillery Band) is a voluntary military band of the Royal Regiment of New Zealand Artillery. The band is based in the south eastern Auckland suburb of Mount Wellington, and was part of the Army Reserve (Territorial Force) up until 2012. The Band has an agreement with 16th Field Regiment, Royal New Zealand Artillery, which allows the band to retain its name and uniform.

The band has performed at a range of events including:

- Commemorations
  - ANZAC Day services and parades
  - Remembrance Day services
- Beating retreats and sunset ceremonies
- Weddings
- Sports events
- Park concerts
- Military tattoos
- Military parades
- Military reunions
- Street parades
- Medal presentation ceremonies

As of 2021, the band is the oldest surviving military band in the country. The band celebrated its centenary in 1964 and its 150th anniversary in 2014.

== History ==
=== Early years ===
After the arrival of the 58th (Rutlandshire) Regiment of Foot in 1845, many were discharged and transferred to the Band of the Auckland Volunteer Rifles, formed in 1858. The first documented public appearance of the band was chronicled in The New Zealander newspaper on 23 October 1860. One of its last duties was to play during the laying-up of the colours of the 58th. From this earlier band the modern band was founded in 1864. 12 years later, the band became the first musical groups to perform God Defend New Zealand, the future national anthem.

=== 1870s to early 1905 ===
From approximately 1869 to 1905, the band was directed by bandmaster Lieutenant Andrew R. Hunter, born in Thames NZ of a famous brass band family. For some time, the band was known as "Hunter's Band" after the popular leader. The band visited Wellington in 1885 to compete in the band contest and was asked to play for Sir George Grey, and later invited to Bellamys in the House of Parliament. It was during this visit that Sir George was alleged to have referred to the Artillery Band as "his boys". Over these years, the band played at various civic events, such as the 1899 Auckland Industrial and Mining Exhibition, concerts and dances, and other band contests. In 1886, the Government decided to support only one band in each town and to call it the Garrison Band. The band was allowed to retain the title Artillery.

=== 1905 to 1918 ===
After Lt. Hunter's tenure, Mr J. Ewart directed the band from 1905 to 1906, and then Mr E. Williams and Mr. P. Williams from 1906 to 1907 and 1907-08 respectively. During the early 1910s, band practices were held in an old shed in Sale Street, Freeman's Bay, under the baton of Lieutenant G. F. Cater (Bandmaster 1908–1926). Lt. Cater was born in Thames, NZ in 1871. In 1912, the band moved to a new space on the top floor of a building on the corner of Albert and Wellesley Streets. At about this time, the Band - a volunteer unit - was taken into the territorials for compulsory training. This in turn meant a change from the Band's blue uniforms to khaki. A further change in band rooms saw the Artillery in the Drill Hall at Rutland Street, shared with the Mounted Rifles Band. Subsequently, a fire was to damage fifty years' worth of music collection due to water damage from the attempt to save the building. Prior to the First World War, there were plenty of engagements for the Band, such as picnics, sports meetings, shows and races. In early 1914, the band, which at this stage had a mixed set of older instruments, ordered a full set of class A Boosey instruments. In August of that year war broke out, and the instruments were lost at sea as a result of enemy action. A new set eventually arrived in 1916.

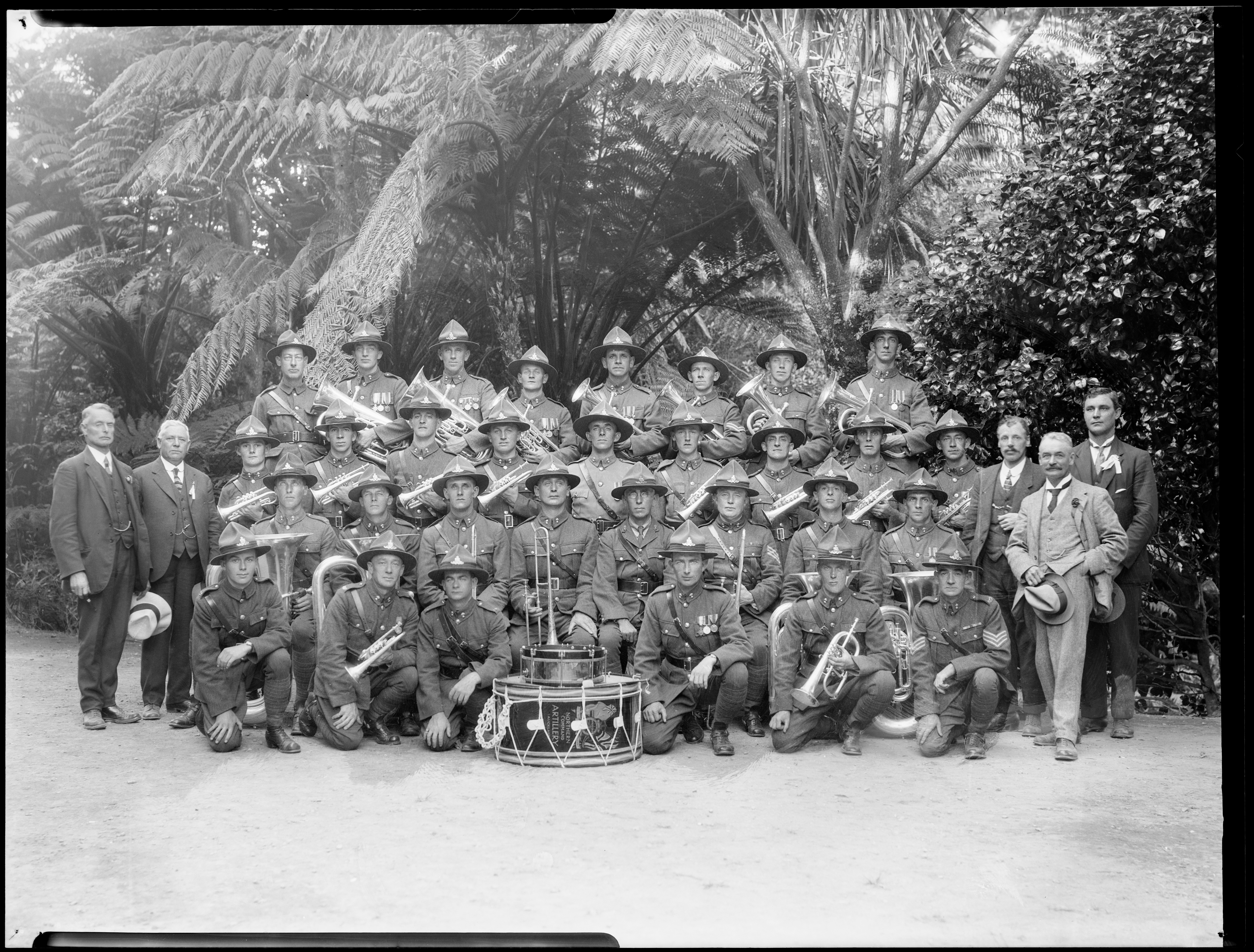
Auckland Artillery Band, circa 1930, by William Oakley.

In 1915, the Band celebrated its 50th jubilee with a social held in the Druid's Hall, Newton.

==== First World War ====
With the outbreak of war the Band volunteered as a unit to go overseas, however the Army authorities keep the Band at Fort Cautley, Takapuna. One or two members, however, did serve overseas. The Band marched troops from the Drill Hall to the old Auckland railway station at the back of the Chief Post Office, playing for almost every batch of troops which left Auckland. Other duties involved manning guns and searchlights at Fort Cautley during four hour shifts at night, and playing for patriotic ventures and recruiting for the army. A few members of the Band helped in the armed escort of Count Felix von Luckner to Motuihe Island, and after his escape they also helped rig guns on the cable ship Iris which was sent out in pursuit. Married men in the band were allowed to work during the day, but had do their four-hour shifts.

=== 1918-1939 Inter-war Years ===
After the war ended, the Band resumed normal functions and activities. A highlight of each year was competing in national band competitions. Of note, the Band often one the 'quickstep' competition. Band competitions were attended in: 1921, Wellington; 1922, Nelson; 1923, New Plymouth, 1924, Palmerston North; 1925, Auckland; 1926, Dunedin at the New Zealand and South Seas International Exhibition. At the Exhibition in Dunedin, the Band stayed at the barracks at St. Kilda and Lieutenant J.T. Lighton was conductor. Due to bad weather before the Quickstep, the expert band marching trainer from the NZ Staff Corps, Major T. P. Laffey, who had been Drum Major from 1923 to 1924, ordered and got steel golf spikes for the bandsmen's boots. These were put on in a working bee that went well into the evening. The next morning the Band paraded "booted and spurred." The studs did the job and the Band marched to victory in the Quickstep competition. At this 1926 contest, the Band met up with a visiting unit, The 2nd Battalion Argyll and Sutherland Highlanders Band under Major Frederick Ricketts. Under the pen name Kenneth Alford, it was he who wrote such famous marches as Coloney Bogey, Great Little Army, Thin Red Line and others. The Band continued to strive to attend contests over the following years under a number of directors of music. Mr C. Hayes (1927), Lt. E. Tregilgas (1927–28), Mr. S. Martin (1928–29), Mr. W. Smith (1929-1932 and 1935–36), Mr. H. Dunn (1932–34), Mr. A. Taylor (1933–35), Capt. G. Buckley V.D. (1936–39).

=== World War Two ===
From 1940, the band was under the baton of Lieut. H. Christensen. In January 1941, the Band was mobilised for war-time training and moved to Waiouru Military Camp. The Band spent three and a half months in camp, training each day and performing a daily Retreat ceremony. In addition to the daily routine, the Band performed at the changing of the guard and at Officers Mess. The Band members were to expected to become efficient as stretcher bearers and received lectures from the camp doctor on elementary first aid. At conclusion of camp the Band accompanied the 38th Battery on a motorised trek back to Auckland, terminating at Narrow Neck Military Camp. The Band marched up through Queen Street to disperse back into civilian life at the Rutland St. Drill Hall. The Band was once again fully mobilised in January 1942, and sent to Hopu Hopu Camp, near Ngaruawahia and attached to 1st Field Regiment, New Zealand Artillery under the command of Colonel L. P. Leary. Colonel Leary was determined that every man would be able to play an active part in the Regiment if called upon. Consequently, the bandsmen were required to do fun training, rifle practice, signalling courses and truck driving. After four months at Hopu Hopu the Regiment and Band moved to the field camp at Bombay Hills. This was the time of the Japanese invasion scare and it was announced that the Regiment was digging in to defend one of the approaches to Auckland. About this time Lieut. Christensen retired due to heart trouble.

W.O.II F. B. Smyth took command, and a critical stage in the Band's history took place. Different batteries of the Regiment absorbed a certain number each of bandsmen with the result that the Band was in grave danger of losing its identity. With winter closing in, lack of suitable practice quarters and difficulties in getting together a whole band, it appeared that the hitherto unbroken service of the unit was about to be terminated. However, at this stage strong representation was made in the right quarters to such effect that the Band was retained by the Army as a separate unit. The Band was posted to the Northern Military School of Instruction at Narrow Neck Camp. This school as primarily maintained for the purpose of officer cadet training. Duties of the Band at Narrow Neck were mainly band work. A big event in the life of the Band took place with the arrival of US Troops in June 1942. The Band entertained troops arriving at the wharfs and was a forerunner of similar event thereafter: Playing troopships in to berth, leading troops from the wharves to the Auckland Railway station, playing at hospitals and the Red Cross vessel "Solace" which regularly called at Auckland.

=== Later years ===
In 1963, the Band played at the opening of the National Women's Hospital, which was formally opened by the Queen Mother. At the time, the band had played at every Royal visit to New Zealand. During the civic parade of the 4 Troop, New Zealand Special Air Service in May 1971 organised to welcome home the units during the Vietnam War, protesters attempted to block the progress of the band through the city. In October 1973, the band changed its name from the Northern Military District to its current name. On 24 September 1995, Major F. F. Whiting opened the current rehearsal band rooms that the band uses to this day.

=== Financial assistance ===
In the 1960s, the band formed an advocacy association to help with its financial backing. The Auckland City Council has also give financial assistance to the band, giving it in April 1970 a grant of $5,000 to establish a permanent rehearsal hall in the city. In the fall of 1974, the band spend up to $20,000 on instruments and uniforms. The band has also received donations from other brass bands, including the Auckland City Silver and Boys' Band.

=== 2012 re-organization ===
This was a result of a 2012 decision to stop public government funding from going to reserve bands, effectively dissolving bands such as the artillery band, which was then based in Maungarei/Mount Wellington. It formerly received around $112,000 a year for providing support to communities from Kaitaia to Palmerston North from the New Zealand Defence Force. Bob Davis, secretary of the Auckland Artillery Band Association criticized the decision saying it was "unnecessary, expensive and flawed". In April 2013, then Bandmaster Dennis Schofield WO1, revealed a need for the band to expand, saying that an extra 10 members would be needed to join the then 26 members to meet its demands for services over the five years that follow.

== Recordings ==
During the week of October 9, 1964, the band of the Royal New Zealand Artillery Northern Military District, station in Auckland, celebrated its centenary. To end of weekend of centennial celebrations then bandmaster Captain Smyth mustered together a band of present and past players, 100 strong, to perform at a spectacular concert in the Auckland Town Hall. The concert was recorded in the Town Hall on October 11, 1964, by the New Zealand Broadcasting Corporation and a record was produced.

In 1988, the band recorded an album titled "Lest We Forget - For ANZAC Day". Originally released on audio cassette tape, the album is now available on CD and on music streaming platforms such as Apple Music and Spotify.

== Musical Directors ==
List of long-serving Musical Directors
Date	Musical Director
1869-1905	Lieutenant A. R. Hunter
1908-1926	Lieutenant G. F. Cater
1942-1944	W.O.II F. B. Smyth
1945-1965	Captain F. B. Smyth MBE ED
	W.O.I D. F. Schofield
2015 - present	WO1 Steven Booth

== See also ==
- New Zealand Army Band
- Australian Army Band Kapooka
- Band of the Royal Canadian Corps of Signals
