= SS Orcades (1921) =

Battleship and ocean liner

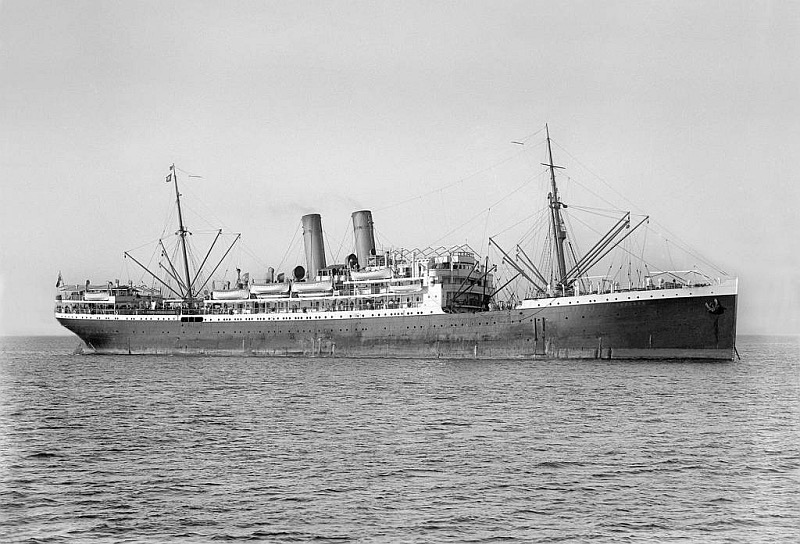
- Orcades c.1921-1925 formerly Prinz Ludwig

History
- Name: Prinz Ludwig (1906) Orcades (1921)
- Owner: North German Lloyd 1906–1919; British Shipping Controller 1919–1921; Orient Steam Navigation Company (Orient Line) 1921–1924
- Route: Germany-South America 1906–1914 UK-Australia 1919–1924
- Builder: Vulkan SMAE, Stettin, Germany
- Laid down: 1903
- Launched: 12 May 1906
- Out of service: 20 September 1924
- Fate: Broken-up 1925, Bremerhaven, Germany

General characteristics
- Tonnage: 9,764 GRT
- Length: 492ft(150m)
- Beam: 58ft(17.7m)
- Draught: 26.9ft(8.2m)
- Installed power: Quadruple expansion engines
- Propulsion: Twin screws
- Speed: 15 knots
- Capacity: 599 passengers: 123 First Class and 476 Third Class (after 1921 refit)
- Notes: Transferred from Germany to the UK under war reparation conditions

SS Orcades was built in Germany from 1903 and launched as Prinz Ludwig. She served on routes to South America until laid up in Germany during the 1914-1918 War.

As part of war reparations Prinz Ludwig came under control of the British Shipping Controller in 1919 and she was managed for the British Government by P&O.

At the war’s conclusion, there were countless thousands of Australian soldiers to be repatriated from Europe and she made several voyages to Australia in this role. Late in 1920 the Prinz Ludwig was laid up awaiting her next role, which came quickly for Orient Line was looking for ships.

Prinz Ludwig was purchased by the Orient Steam Navigation Company (Orient Line) in 1921 and she underwent a refit and was renamed Orcades.

After her refit she accommodated a comfortable 599 passengers, 123 First Class and 476 Third Class, and she commenced on the very busy Australian service on October 21, 1921. Due to her slower speed she operated on a secondary service, which was separate from the “mail service” thus she was prefixed SS and never RMS.

Although she was never the best arrangement for Orient Line, she was a stop gap until Orient Line could build their new fleet of ships, the first scheduled to come into service in 1924, the next in 1925 and then the SS Orcades could be withdrawn.

She departed London on her final voyage for Orient Line on September 20, 1924. Upon her return she was placed on the market and the Orcades was laid up but was sold in due course and broken up at Bremerhaven Germany in 1925.

Orcades is an ancient name for the Orkney Islands.
