= Ryazan, Vologda Oblast =

Ryazan Рязань
- Village
- Location within Vologda Oblast Location within Russia
- Coordinates: 59°02′N 37°18′E
- Country: Russia
- Region: Vologda Oblast
- District: Cherepovetsky District
- Time zone: UTC+3:00

Ryazan (Russian: Рязань) is a rural locality (a village) in Korotovskoye Rural Settlement, Cherepovetsky District, Vologda Oblast, Russia. The population was 4 as of 2002.

== Geography ==
Ryazan is located 55 km (34 mi) southwest of Cherepovets (the district's administrative centre) by road. Akinkhovo is the nearest rural locality.
