= Antonio Mercadante =

Italian art historian and critic (1962–2018)

Antonio Alessandro Mercadante was an Italian art historian and critic specialized in 20th century Italian painting. He was born in Rome in 1962 and he died in Sciacca, Sicily, in 2018. (1)

Initially trained as a classical cellist, Mercadante switched his focus to the visual arts while studying at Università La Sapienza of Rome, where he graduated in 1986 with an undergraduate thesis on Italian art between WWI and WWII. He then specialized in contemporary art with scholars Simonetta Lux and Corrado Maltese before becoming an assistant professor of History of Contemporary Arts at La Sapienza. Mercadante soon moved to Paris, France, where he collaborated with the Italian Institute of Culture, writing critical articles and curating art exhibits. Starting in the early 1990s, he contributed reviews and essays to numerous Italian art journals and magazines. He organized seasons of art exhibits for museums and galleries, both in Italy and France, with an emphasis on painting. Mercadante also created several projects aimed at facilitating exchanges for young artists throughout Europe.

Mercadante's critical essays appeared in art catalogues by many renowned Italian publishers in the field of art: Mazzotta, Electa, De Luca, Mondadori, Colombo, and Gangemi. In 2009 he began a collaboration with the publisher Lussografica of Caltanissetta, Sicily, and produced five books of art history fundamental to the reconstruction of Sicilian art from the 1800s to present. All of Mercadante's books are accompanied by his own photographic documentation. (2)
