= Apolloni =

Apolloni is an Italian surname. Notable people with the surname include:

- Achille Apolloni (1823–1901), Italian cardinal
- Adolfo Apolloni (1855–1923), Italian sculptor
- Ag Apolloni (born 1982), Albanian writer, poet, playwright, scholar and essayist
- Giovanni Filippo Apolloni (c. 1620 – 1688), Italian composer and librettist
- Giuseppe Apolloni (1822–1889), Italian composer
- Luigi Apolloni (born 1967), Italian football manager and former player

== See also ==
- Apollonis, a Muse in Greek mythology
