= SS Ryazan =

Steamships named Ryazan include:

- SS Ryazan, a Russian cargo liner in service 1909–14 that was captured by Imperial Germany and refitted as merchant raider SMS Cormoran (1914) before being scuttled in 1916 at Guam
- SS Ryazan (1944), a Sovitet Hansa A Type cargo ship in service 1946–79
