= Kiwi =

Kiwi most commonly refers to:

- Kiwi (bird), a flightless bird endemic to New Zealand
- Kiwi (nickname), for New Zealanders
- Kiwifruit, an edible vine berry
- Kiwi dollar, a unit of currency

Kiwi or KIWI may also refer to:

== Arts and entertainment ==
=== Comics ===
- Kiwi Blitz, a 2009 webcomic by Mary Cagle

=== Music ===
- Kiwi (band), a girl group from Mongolia
- "Kiwi" (song), 2017, by Harry Styles
- "Kiwi", a 2007 song by Maroon 5 from It Won't Be Soon Before Long

=== Radio and film ===
- KIWI, a radio station in California, U.S., currently branded as Radio Lobo
- Kiwi FM, a New Zealand radio network
- Kiwi!, a 2006 short animated film

== Science and technology ==
- .kiwi, an Internet top-level domain
- KIWI (openSUSE), image software
- KIWI, a testbed prototype of the nuclear thermal rocket
- Kiwi Farms, an Internet forum
- Kiwi IRC, an Internet Relay Chat software client
- Kiwi vacuum extractor, a device to assist delivery of a baby

== Ships ==
- HMNZS Kiwi, several ships
  - HMNZS Kiwi (T102), a minesweeper commissioned in 1941
  - HMNZS Kiwi (P3554), a patrol boat commissioned in 1983

== Sports ==
- Kiwi (horse) (1977–1995), a thoroughbred racehorse
- Kiwis (rugby league), the New Zealand national rugby league team
- Kiwi FC or Vailima Kiwi FC, a Samoan football club
- Kiwi Soccers, an American Samoan football club

== Travel ==
- Kiwi.com, a Czech online travel agency
- Kiwi International Air Lines, an American airline 1992–1999
- Kiwi Regional Airlines, a New Zealand airline 2015–2016
- Kiwi Travel International Airlines, a 1990s New Zealand airline
- Wiscasset Airport (ICAO code: KIWI), US

== People with the given name ==
- Kiwi Camara (born 1984), Filipino American attorney
- Kiwi Chow (born 1979), Hong Kong filmmaker
- Kiwi Gardner (born 1993), American basketball player
- Kiwi Kingston (1914–1992), New Zealand wrestler and film actor
- Kiwi Searancke (born c. 1952), New Zealand rugby player

== Other uses ==
- Kiwi (business) or Kiwi Campus, a food delivery service using robots
- Kiwi (shoe polish), an Australian brand name
- KiwiSaver, a savings scheme
- Kiwi (store), a Scandinavian supermarket chain
- Kiwi River, a river in New Zealand's South Island
- Goodnight Kiwi, an animated short seen in TVNZ

== See also ==
- Bulford Kiwi, a chalk hill carving in Wiltshire, England
- Kiwikiwi (Blechnum fluviatile), a fern species
- Kivi (disambiguation)
- Kivy (disambiguation)
