= Gordon Bridson =

New Zealand swimmer

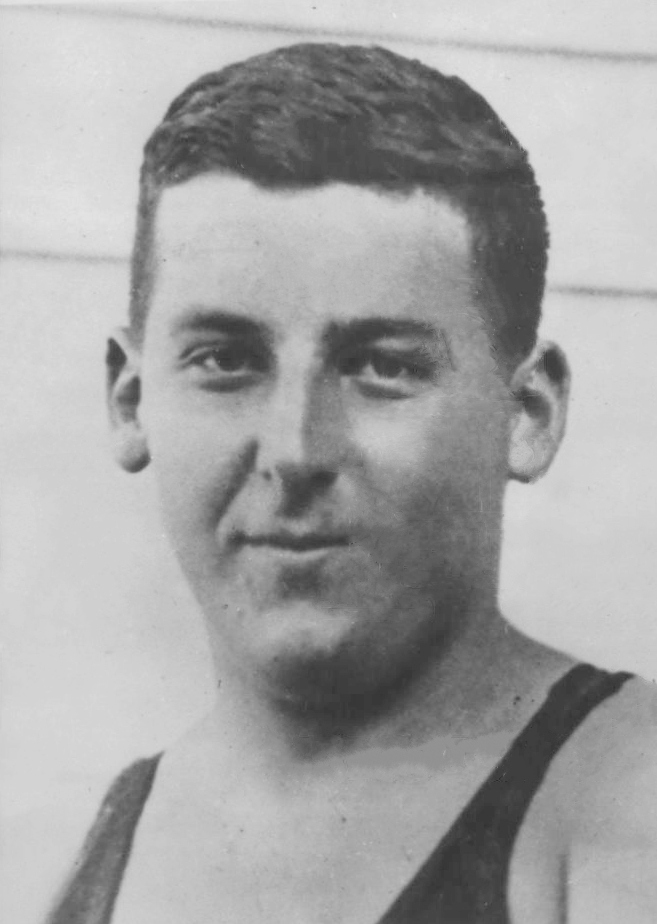
- Bridson in 1930
- Born: 2 December 1909; Wellington, New Zealand
- Died: 6 December 1972 (aged 63); Cambridge, New Zealand
- Military career
- Allegiance: New Zealand
- Branch: Royal New Zealand Navy
- Service years: 1927–46
- Rank: Commander
- Commands: HMNZS Kiwi; HMT Walnut
- Conflicts: Second World War
- Awards: Distinguished Service Order; Distinguished Service Cross; Navy Cross (United States)
- Sports career
- Country: New Zealand
- Sport: Swimming

Sports achievements and titles
- National finals: 100 yd freestyle champion (1930, 1931, 1932); 220 yd freestyle champion (1930, 1931, 1932); 440 yd freestyle champion (1929, 1930, 1931)
Medal record
Swimming
Representing New Zealand
British Empire Games
Silver medal – second place	1930 Hamilton	400-yard freestyle
Silver medal – second place	1930 Hamilton	1500-yard freestyle

Commander Gordon Bridson, DSO, DSC (2 December 1909 – 6 December 1972) was a New Zealand swimmer who won two silver medals at the 1930 British Empire Games. He was also in the New Zealand Royal Naval Volunteer Reserve and in the Second World War, he served in the Royal New Zealand Navy. Seconded to the Royal Navy in 1940, he commanded a minesweeper vessel that accompanied coastal convoys along the English Channel. He was later the commander of the minesweeper HMNZS Kiwi which, with her sister ship Moa, sunk the Japanese submarine I-1 off Guadalcanal in the Solomon Islands.

== Early life ==
Gordon Bridson was born in Wellington in New Zealand on 2 December 1909. His parents were William Bridson, a manager, and Agnes Bridson née Gordon. The Bridson family later moved to Auckland where he grew up. He was educated at Auckland Grammar School up to six form level. He then started working at a metal merchant. He began his naval career in 1927 by enlisting in the Auckland Division of the New Zealand Royal Naval Volunteer Reserve (RNVR) in Auckland. He quickly progressed to being a commissioned officer.

An accomplished swimmer, Bridson won nine national men's swimming freestyle titles over the 100 yards (91 m), 220 yards (200 m) and 440 yards (400 m) distances from the period 1929 to 1932. He participated in the 1930 British Empire Games in Hamilton, Ontario, where, competing for New Zealand, he won silver medals for both the 400 yards (370 m) and 1,500 yards (1,400 m) freestyle.

== Second World War ==
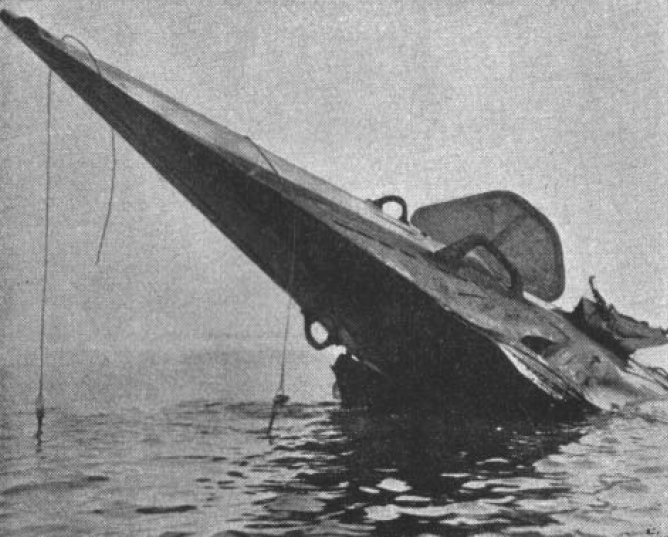
The wreck of the Japanese submarine I-1, sunk by Moa and Kiwi

Bridson was not immediately mobilised for war service following the outbreak of the Second World War in 1939. He was called up for duty in April the following year, receiving a promotion to lieutenant commander. The next month a group of RNVR personnel, including Bridson, were dispatched to England to serve in the Royal Navy. Once in England, Bridson was given command of HMT Walnut, a Tree-class minesweeper that belonged to the 25th anti-submarine and minesweeping flotilla. He was one of several New Zealanders commanding ships in the flotilla. For the next several months, Walnut helped protect convoys along the east coast of England and in the English Channel.

In late 1941, Bridson was appointed the commander of the newly built HMNZS Kiwi, one of three Bird-class minesweeping trawlers which had just been commissioned into the newly formed Royal New Zealand Navy (RNZN). After initial working up in Scotland, Kiwi accompanied a convoy that departed on 1 January 1942 to cross the North Atlantic to Newfoundland. While crossing the Atlantic, Kiwi encountered a severe storm which damaged the ship and necessitated repairs in Boston. It then continued onto New Zealand via a transit through the Panama Canal.

In the 1942 King's Birthday Honours, Bridson was awarded the Distinguished Service Cross for his leadership the previous year as commander of Walnut. The published citation noted his "outstanding zeal, patience and cheerfulness."

=== Solomon Islands ===
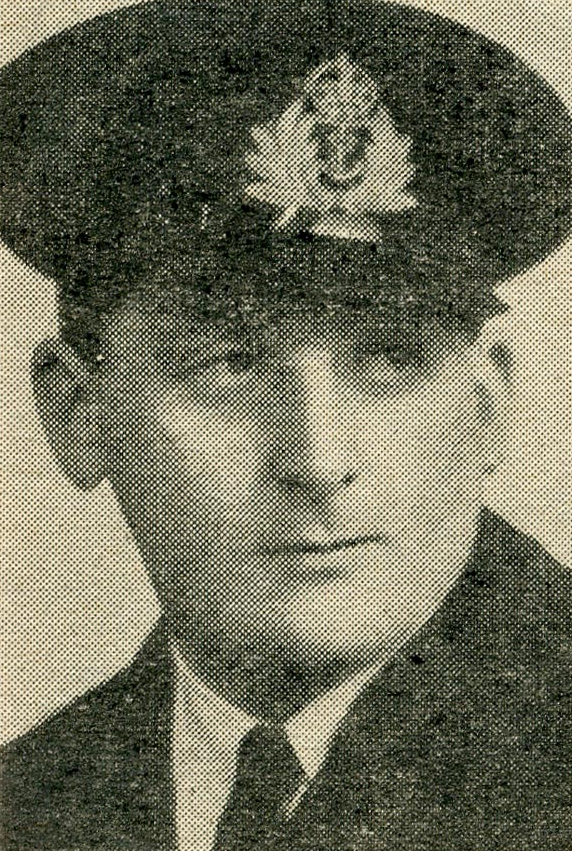
Bridson in naval uniform during World War II

Arriving in Auckland on 21 May 1942, the Kiwi, together with Moa and Tui, the two other Bird-class minesweepers, were assigned to the 25th Minesweeping Flotilla. At the time of the arrival of the Bird ships in New Zealand, the flotilla was operating in the waters around Fiji but in August 1942 was dispatched on anti-submarine duties around Noumea. Kiwi was sailing with the flotilla by the end of the following month. In December 1942 the flotilla set sail for deployment in the Solomon Islands in support of the Allied operations there.

The flotilla was initially used in anti-submarine patrols around Guadalcanal's Cape Esperance. On 14 January 1943 Kiwi was the subject of a friendly fire incident when in poor light an American PT boat fired two torpedoes at her which only just missed. Bridson subsequently became friends with the commander of the PT boat. Later the same month, in the late evening of 29 January, Kiwi and Moa was carrying out patrols around Guadalcanal with Bridson in overall command. A Japanese submarine, the I-1, was detected by Kiwi, which launched a series of depth charges. The I-1 surfaced so it could use its 5-inch gun on the much smaller minesweepers. The Kiwi repeatedly rammed the submarine while firing point blank with its own 4-inch gun and an unofficial 20-mm Oerlikon that had been installed on its bow while stationed at Noumea. The submarine was badly damaged but broke free. Eventually, chased by Moa, the I-1 was stranded and sank on a reef. During this action, three of the Kiwi's crew were wounded, one fatally.

The damage to the Kiwi as a result of the engagement with the I-1 saw it return to New Zealand for repairs to her bow. Once back in Auckland, the crew of the Kiwi paraded down Queen Street to the city's town hall, where a civic reception was held in recognition of their exploits in sinking the I-1. For his role in the destruction of the Japanese submarine, Bridson was awarded the Distinguished Service Order and the United States Navy Cross.

=== Later military service ===
Once repairs were completed, Kiwi returned to the Solomon Islands in May 1943, although not before another friendly fire incident where she was fired upon by an American Liberty Ship. Bridson remained in command of Kiwi until May 1944 when he received a temporary promotion to commander and took over as naval officer-in-charge Dunedin. Six months later he was made commander in charge at Lyttelton. In April 1945, he was appointed as an honorary aide de camp to the Governor-General of New Zealand, Sir Cyril Newall. He remained in these posts until demobilisation from the RNZN in 1946.

== Later life ==
Returning to civilian life, Bridson moved to Te Aroha, in the North Island and became involved in the hardware trade. Several years later he took up farming on a property near Cambridge, where he died on 6 December 1972. He was survived by his wife Ada née Gilcrist, who he had married in March 1940, and three children.
