= HMNZS Wakakura =

Two ships of the Royal New Zealand Navy (RNZN) have been named HMNZS Wakakura:

- HMNZS Wakakura (T00), transferred to the RNZN in 1941, was a Castle-class minesweeper. She served for New Zealand in the Second World War. Sold and converted to a merchant ship in 1947, becoming the SS Wakakura
- HMNZS Wakakura (P3555), commissioned in 1985, was a Moa-class patrol boat, decommissioned in 2007
