= Monowai =

Monowai may refer to:

- Lake Monowai, a lake in New Zealand
- Monowai Seamount, a volcanic seamount north of New Zealand
- HMNZS Monowai (F59), an armed merchant cruiser commissioned in 1940
- HMNZS Monowai (A06), a hydrographic survey vessel commissioned in 1977

== See also ==
- HMNZS Monowai, a list of Royal New Zealand Navy vessels
