= Survey ships of the Royal New Zealand Navy =

Commissioned survey and research vessels of the Royal New Zealand Navy from its formation on 1 October 1941 to the present:

Name	Type	Class	Dates	Notes
HMNZS Lachlan	Survey vessel	River class	1949–1975	Converted frigate. Replaced by Monowai
HMNZS Monowai	Hydrographic survey vessel	Converted merchant ship	1975–1998	Former Pacific Island ferry Moana Roa. Replaced by Resolution.
HMNZS Resolution	Survey and research vessel	Stalwart class	1997–2012	Former USNS Tenacious
HMNZS Takapu	Inshore survey craft	Moa class	1980–2000	
HMNZS Tarapunga	Inshore survey craft	Moa class	1980–2000	
HMNZS Tui (T234)	Oceanographic research	Bird class	1956–1967	1941-1946 was ASW minesweeping naval trawler, 1952-1955 was training ship
HMNZS Tui (1970)	Research vessel	Conrad class	1970–1997	Replaced by Resolution.

== See also ==
- Current Royal New Zealand Navy ships
- List of ships of the Royal New Zealand Navy
- History of research ships
