= HMNZS Tui (T234) =

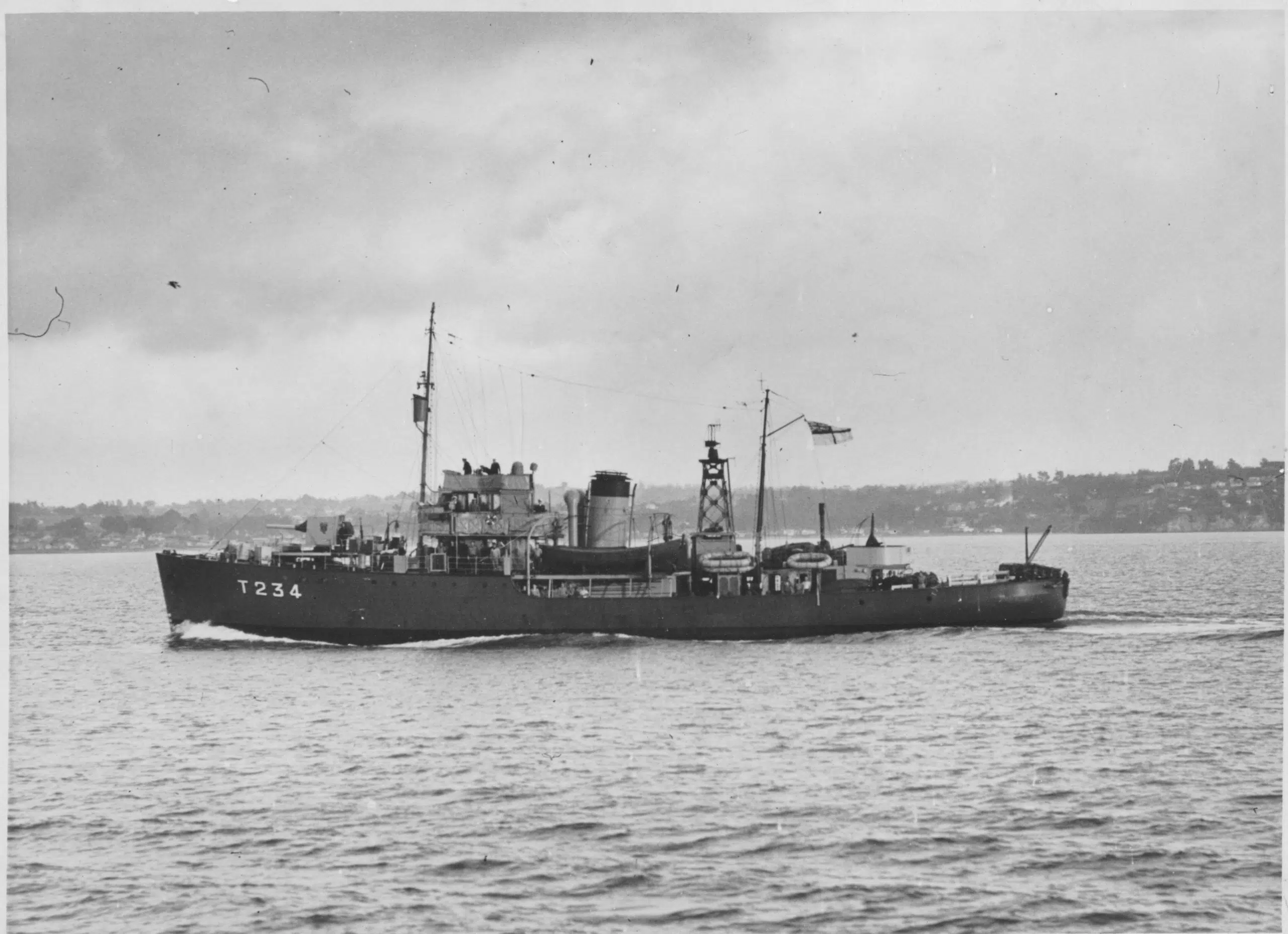
- HMNZS Tui in 1944

History

New Zealand
- Name: Tui
- Builder: Henry Robb Ltd, Scotland
- Commissioned: 26 November 1941
- Decommissioned: 22 December 1967
- Identification: Pennant number: T234
- Fate: Sold to Pacific Scrap in December 1969

General characteristics
- Class & type: Bird-class minesweeper
- Displacement: 607 standard, 923 full load
- Length: 168 ft (51 m)/157.5 ft (48.0 m)
- Beam: 30 ft (9.1 m)
- Draught: 15.3 ft (4.7 m)
- Propulsion: 1,100 ihp (820 kW) oil
- Speed: 13 knots (24 km/h; 15 mph)
- Complement: 33–35
- Armament: 1 × 4 in (102 mm) gun; 2 × 1 Hotchkiss guns; twin Lewis guns; 40 depth charges

HMNZS Tui (T234) was a Bird-class minesweeper of the Royal New Zealand Navy. She was commissioned in 1941 for minesweeping and anti-submarine roles. Tui was the first of two ships with this name to serve in the Royal New Zealand Navy and was named after a native bird from New Zealand.

== War service ==
In March 1942 in Scotland, Tui and the four Isles-class trawlers, Killegray, Inchkeith, Sanda and Scarba had been newly built for New Zealand. They were formed into a flotilla and departed from the River Clyde with a convoy bound for Canada. The trawler flotilla then left for Auckland, arriving there in August.

In Auckland, Tui was assigned to the 25th Minesweeping Flotilla and sailed for Suva to replace Matai. In December she joined her sister ships Kiwi and Moa at Nouméa. The 25th Minesweeping Flotilla had been offered to COMSOPAC, and by early December Tui, Moa, and Kiwi with Matai as flotilla leader, were all together at Nouméa ready to move north. They sailed for the Solomons, escorting a convoy some of the way. Making Tulagi their base they began anti-submarine screen patrols on 19 December 1942 off Tulagi and Lunga Point, Guadalcanal.

=== Landing barges ===
On 21 January 1943, Tui and Moa came across four Japanese landing barges stopped close inshore. When Tui and Moa closed in, those aboard the barges opened fire with machine guns and small arms and got underway. At close range Moa fired on the leading barge, but a fluke shot passed through the 4-inch (102 mm) gun aperture, ignited a cordite charge and injured all seven in the gun crew. Moa managed to silence the first barge and sink the last in line with 20 mm (0.79 in) gunfire, then withdrew and attended to the cordite fire and injuries. Tui then opened fire on the barges, sinking one with her 4-inch gun, and the remaining two escaped inshore in the darkness.

=== Submarine I-17 ===
On 19 August 1943, while escorting a convoy from Nouméa, Tui picked up a submarine contact. She made an initial run over it without using depth charges, a second run dropping two depth charges, and a third run throwing another two depth charges. Contact was lost and Tui signalled some US Kingfisher seaplanes of US Scouting Squadron VS-57, based in New Caledonia, to join the search. One of these indicated that Tui should investigate smoke on the horizon, where a submarine was sighted on the surface and Tui opened fire at maximum range, scoring one, possibly two hits. The aircraft then dropped depth charges, and the submarine sank at 23°26′S 166°50′E.

The submarine was the Japanese submarine I-17, 2,190 tons, 108 metres (354 ft) long, built in 1939. Ninety-one crewmen were lost and Tui picked up six survivors who said that Tui's depth charge attacks had damaged the submarine and forced it to the surface.

The commanding officer and anti-submarine control officer on Tui had doubted whether the contact was really a submarine, so the depth-charge attacks were not properly carried out. A later Naval Board report concluded that "had the proper procedure been followed and a full depth-charge pattern fired in the original attack, there is little doubt but that the submarine would have been destroyed."

I-17 was the first Axis ship to shell the United States mainland when she shelled an oil refinery near Santa Barbara on 23 February 1942.

=== Other service ===
COMSOPAC released the New Zealand ships in June 1945, and Tui departed the Solomons escorting a group of six RNZN Fairmiles. On her return to Auckland, Tui worked with Kiwi and the 7th Trawler Group on the final clearing of the German minefield in the outer Hauraki Gulf.

== Post-war service ==
Tui was put in reserve in June 1946.

=== Training ===
In 1952 the Navy wanted to free some Loch-class frigates for service in the Korean War. Tui was recommissioned in February 1952 to take over training duties previously undertaken by the frigate Kaniere. This training was carried out for the Naval Volunteer Reserve and included training for compulsory reservists as well as volunteer reservists and sea cadets.

She was also used part-time by the DSIR and the Naval Research Laboratory (NRL).

=== Oceanographic research ===
In October 1955, Tui was docked for conversion to an oceanographic research ship. On 5 March 1956, the now disarmed Tui was recommissioned and reclassified as a fleet auxiliary. She made many scientific cruises for the DSIR and NRL to places around New Zealand and Pacific islands. She investigated shipwrecks, notably MV Holmglen off Timaru in 1959 and MV Kaitawa off Cape Reinga in 1966.

=== Fate ===
Tui was decommissioned for the last time on 22 December 1967. She was stripped of her equipment and sold in December 1969 to Pacific Scrap Ltd who demolished her. She was replaced in 1970 by a purpose-built oceanographic ship with the same name.

== See also ==
- Minesweepers of the Royal New Zealand Navy
- Survey ships of the Royal New Zealand Navy
