= HMNZS Monowai =

The name HMNZS Monowai may apply to the following ships of the Royal New Zealand Navy:

- HMNZS Monowai (F59), an armed merchant cruiser commissioned 1940–1943
- HMNZS Monowai (A06), a hydrographic survey vessel commissioned 1977–1997
