= Kivi =

Kivi may refer to:

- Kivi (surname)
- Kivi, Iran, a city in Ardabil Province, Iran
- Kivi, Khalkhal, a village in Ardabil Province, Iran
- KIVI-TV, a TV station in Boise-Nampa, Idaho
- Kivi, an albatross in the book Call It Courage

== See also ==
- Kivy (disambiguation)
- Kiwi (disambiguation)
- Khivi
