= Royal Naval School of Meteorology and Oceanography =

- RNSMO
- Location within Cornwall
- Former names: Royal Naval School of Meteorology

General information
- Type: Training centre
- Location: Cornwall, TR12 7RH
- Coordinates: 50.088°N 5.249°W
- Elevation: 80 m (262 ft)
- Completed: 1959
- Inaugurated: 1959
- Client: Fleet Air Arm
- Owner: Royal Navy

The Royal Naval School of Meteorology and Oceanography was a Royal Navy military meteorology training establishment in Cornwall; the site closed, and the school moved to Devon in 2003.

== History ==
The meteorological training site began at Dale, Pembrokeshire, moving to Cornwall in 1959 for sailors, with officers arriving in 1960 at the RN School of Meteorology.

Also at the site in Wales was the RN Air Direction Centre, which trained officers and sailors in radar navigation; this training moved to Fareham in 1959 for sailors, and officer radar training moved to Somerset in July 1960.

The site became the Royal Naval School of Meteorology and Oceanography in 1968.

=== Hydrography ===
Hydrography was taught in Devon, and any additional oceanography was taught at Fareham, at the Applied Oceanography and Meteorological Centre.

The site in Cornwall closed in 2003, and meteorological and oceanography training was moved to the RN School of Hydrography, in Devon; this site in Devon opened in the early 1960s. The RN Hydrography School received four survey motor boats in September 1996.

The combined site is now the HMTU.

=== Commanders ===
- 2000 John Sephton

== Meteorology in the Royal Navy ==
After training, officers entered the Naval Weather Service. The Weather and Oceanographic Centre was in Hertfordshire, which is now the Joint Operational Meteorology Oceanography Centre.

== Training ==
The meteorology course was known as METOC. Current training has six months of meteorology, followed by three months of hydrography.

== See also ==
- List of survey vessels of the Royal Navy
- Naval Hydrographic and Oceanographic Service, of France
