= Takapu =

Takapu or Tākapu is:

- The New Zealand name for the Australasian gannet (Morus serrator), a seabird.
- HMNZS Takapu, a patrol vessel of the Royal New Zealand Navy
- Takapu Road in Wellington, New Zealand, is the location of Takapu Road Railway Station and Takapu Valley.
