= HMNZS Resolution =

Royal New Zealand Navy surveillance ship

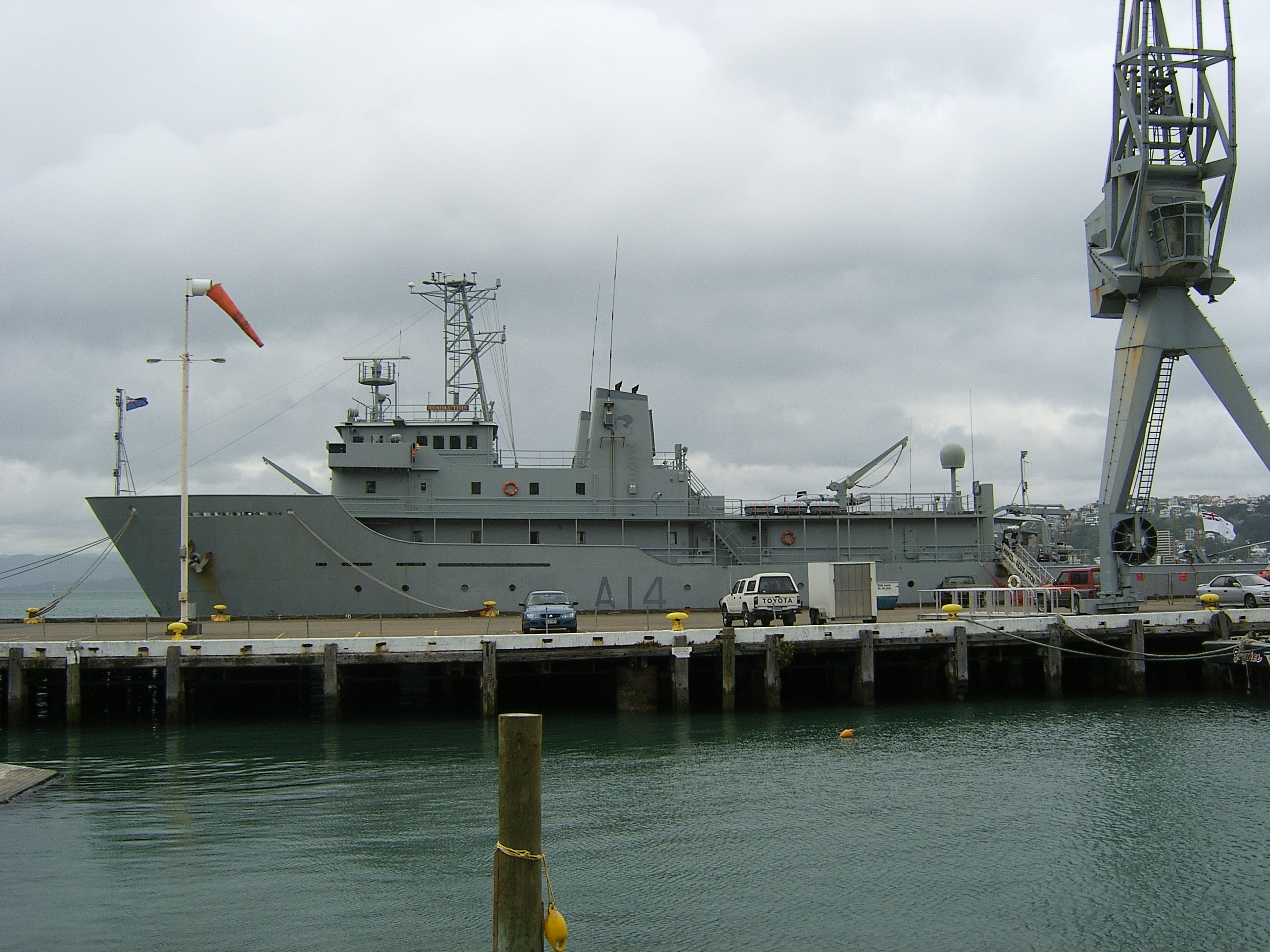
- HMNZS Resolution

History

United States
- Name: USNS Tenacious
- Ordered: 20 February 1987
- Builder: VT Halter Marine, Inc., Moss Point, Mississippi
- Laid down: 26 February 1988
- Launched: 17 February 1989
- Commissioned: 29 September 1989
- Stricken: 6 February 1997
- Fate: Sold to New Zealand

History

New Zealand
- Name: HMNZS Resolution
- Namesake: Cook's sloop Resolution
- Acquired: 6 February 1997
- Commissioned: 13 February 1997
- Decommissioned: 27 April 2012
- Home port: Gisborne
- Fate: Sold into civilian service

History

Hong Kong
- Name: RV Geo Resolution
- Owner: EGS Group
- Acquired: 11 October 2014
- Home port: Hong Kong
- Identification: IMO number: 8835243; MMSI number: 512000200; Callsign: ZMRS
- Status: In service

General characteristics
- Class & type: Stalwart-class ocean surveillance ship
- Displacement: 2,262 tonnes
- Length: 68 m (223 ft)
- Beam: 13 m (43 ft)
- Draught: 4.4 m (14 ft)
- Propulsion: Four Caterpillar D398B diesel generators 3,200 hp (2.4 MW); Twin shafts; Bow thruster 550 hp (410 kW)
- Speed: 11 knots (20 km/h; 13 mph)
- Range: 21,500 nautical miles (39,800 km; 24,700 mi)
- Boats & landing craft carried: (SMB) Adventure
- Complement: 41 (7 officers, 34 ratings); Max accommodation: 45

HMNZS Resolution (A14) was a hydrographic ship of the Royal New Zealand Navy (RNZN). Originally the United States Naval Ship USNS Tenacious (T-AGOS-17), the Stalwart-class ocean surveillance ship was used by the United States to locate and track Soviet submarines from 1989 to 1997, when she was transferred to the RNZN for use as a hydrographic survey ship. She served until 27 April 2012. She was subsequently sold to EGS Group, a private surveying company, and renamed RV Geo Resolution.

== Construction ==
The ship's construction contract was awarded 20 February 1987 to VT Halter Marine, Inc. of Moss Point, Mississippi, under then name Intrepid. Her keel was laid down 26 February 1988, she was launched 17 February 1989 and commissioned as USNS Tenacious on 29 September 1989. The renaming was prompted by protests from veterans of the Essex-class aircraft carrier USS Intrepid, who felt that the surveillance ship was not a fitting vessel to carry on the carrier's name.

== Operational history ==
=== United States ===
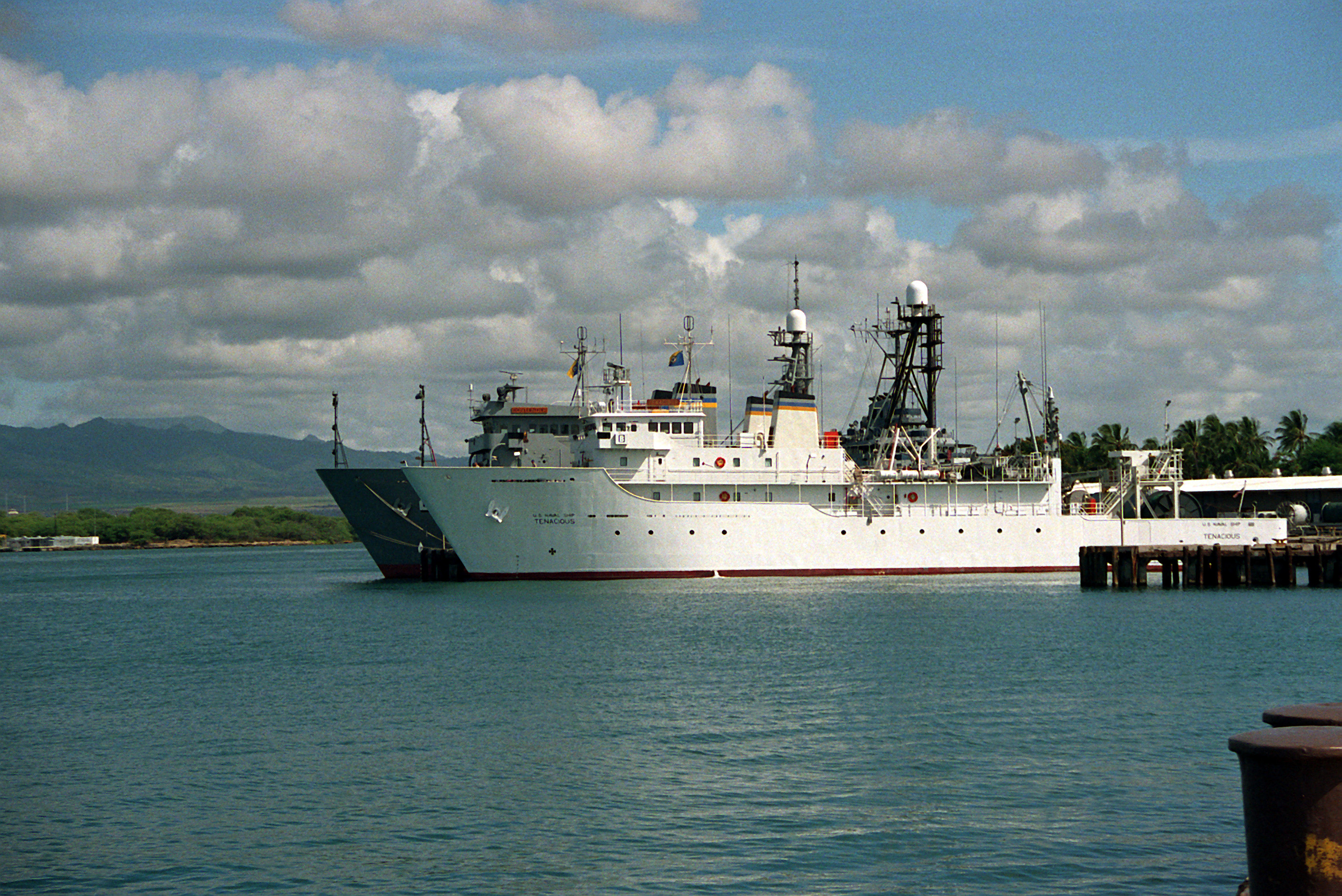
Tenacious (foreground) and sister ship Contender tied up at Bishop's Point, Pearl Harbor, in 1991

During the Cold War, Ocean Surveillance Ships patrolled the world's oceans searching for Soviet Navy submarines. Data was collected using the Surveillance Towed Array Sensor System (SURTASS), consisting of listening devices and electronic equipment that transmit the acoustic data via satellite to shore for analysis. SURTASS is a linear array of 8,575 feet (2,614 m) deployed on a 6,000-foot (1,800 m) tow cable and neutrally buoyant. The array could operate at depths between 500 and 1,500 feet (150 and 460 m).

Tenacious was stricken from the Naval Vessel Register and sold to New Zealand on 6 February 1997.

=== New Zealand ===
On commissioning into the RNZN on 13 February 1997, the ship was renamed HMNZS Resolution, after the sailing sloop HMS Resolution, used by James Cook during his second and third voyages of exploration, in recognition of the extensive hydrographic survey work done by Cook. Resolution replaced HMNZ Ships Tui and Monowai as the navy's primary survey and acoustic research vessel. She undertook various marine survey tasks, including for the Land Information New Zealand agency. SMB Adventure was operated by Resolution as a tender and survey motor boat.

Resolution sponsored a scholarship for under-privileged high school students to participate in a 10-day passage on the sail training ship Spirit of New Zealand. On occasion, university and high school students were embarked aboard Resolution as part of the 'Students at Sea' programme.

On 22 February 2011, Resolution was underway off Christchurch when the 2011 Canterbury earthquake occurred. NZ Navy Today said later : '..the feeling onboard was that the engines had been set in full astern with associated shuddering and shaking. It was only when a dust cloud over Christchurch was observed and chatter on VHF soon alerted the bridge team of the enormity of the disaster. With Captain Dean McDougall (CTU 654.0.1, Captain Fleet Operational Support) in an established headquarters on HMNZS Canterbury (L421) in Lyttelton, Resolution reported for duty and was subsequently called in to conduct a hydrographic confidence survey of the main channel into the Port of Lyttelton.

Resolution was decommissioned at Devonport Naval Base on 27 April 2012. She was subsequently sold to EGS Group, a private surveying company, and renamed RV Geo Resolution. Following the sale she left Devonport Naval Base for the final time on 11 October 2014.

== See also ==
- Survey ships of the Royal New Zealand Navy
