= Hinau =

Hinau may refer to:

- Elaeocarpus dentatus, a New Zealand native tree
- HMNZS Hinau, the name of two ships of the Royal New Zealand Navy
