= Kivi (surname) =

Family name

Kivi is an Estonian and Finnish surname meaning "stone" in both languages. Notable people with the surname include:

- Aleksis Kivi (1834–1872), Finnish author
- Antero Kivi (1904–1981), Finnish discus thrower
- Eve Kivi (born 1938), Estonian actress
- Iikka Kivi (born 1986), Finnish stand-up comedian and scriptwriter
- Juha Kivi (born 1964), Finnish long jumper
- Katrin Kivi (born 1967), Estonian diplomat
- Karri Kivi (born 1970), Finnish ice hockey player and coach
- Maarja Kivi (born 1986), Estonian musician, also known as Marya Roxx
- Signe Kivi (born 1957), Estonian textile artist and politician

== As a first name ==
- Kivi Larmola (born 1966), Finnish comics artist
