= SMB Adventure =

History

New Zealand
- Name: Adventure
- Launched: 1998
- Out of service: 2022
- Identification: Pennant number: A05

General characteristics
- Class & type: Survey Motor Boat
- Type: Catamaran
- Displacement: 9 tonnes
- Length: 9.7 m (32 ft)
- Beam: 3.5 m (11 ft)
- Draught: 0.7 m (2.3 ft)
- Propulsion: 2 x Volvo-Penta AD31P/DP 4-cylinder diesels (150 hp each)
- Speed: Baseline speed 25 knots (46 km/h; 29 mph); Economical speed 18 knots (33 km/h; 21 mph); Survey speed 10 knots (19 km/h; 12 mph)
- Range: 1,000 nautical miles (1,900 km; 1,200 mi)
- Complement: 3 crew, with up to 6 shore support party

SMB Adventure is an inshore Survey Motor Boat of the Royal New Zealand Navy and part of the Navy's Deployable Hydrographic Unit. She is not a commissioned ship, and was usually transported on and operated as a tender from HMNZS Resolution. Adventure is capable of independent operations and short coastal passages.

SMB Adventure was built in Kumeu, North Auckland, in 1998. A catamaran hull was chosen to give a wide working area aft and allow the multibeam echo sounder to be retracted between the hulls.

== Bibliography ==
- Saunders, Stephen (2009). Jane's Fighting Ships 2009–2010. Jane's Information Group. ISBN 978-0-71062-888-6.
