= Tarapunga =

Tarapunga is:

- The Māori language name for the red-billed gull and black-billed gull
- HMNZS Tarapunga is a patrol vessel of the Royal New Zealand Navy
