= HMNZS Wakakura (P3555) =

Royal New Zealand Navy patrol vessel

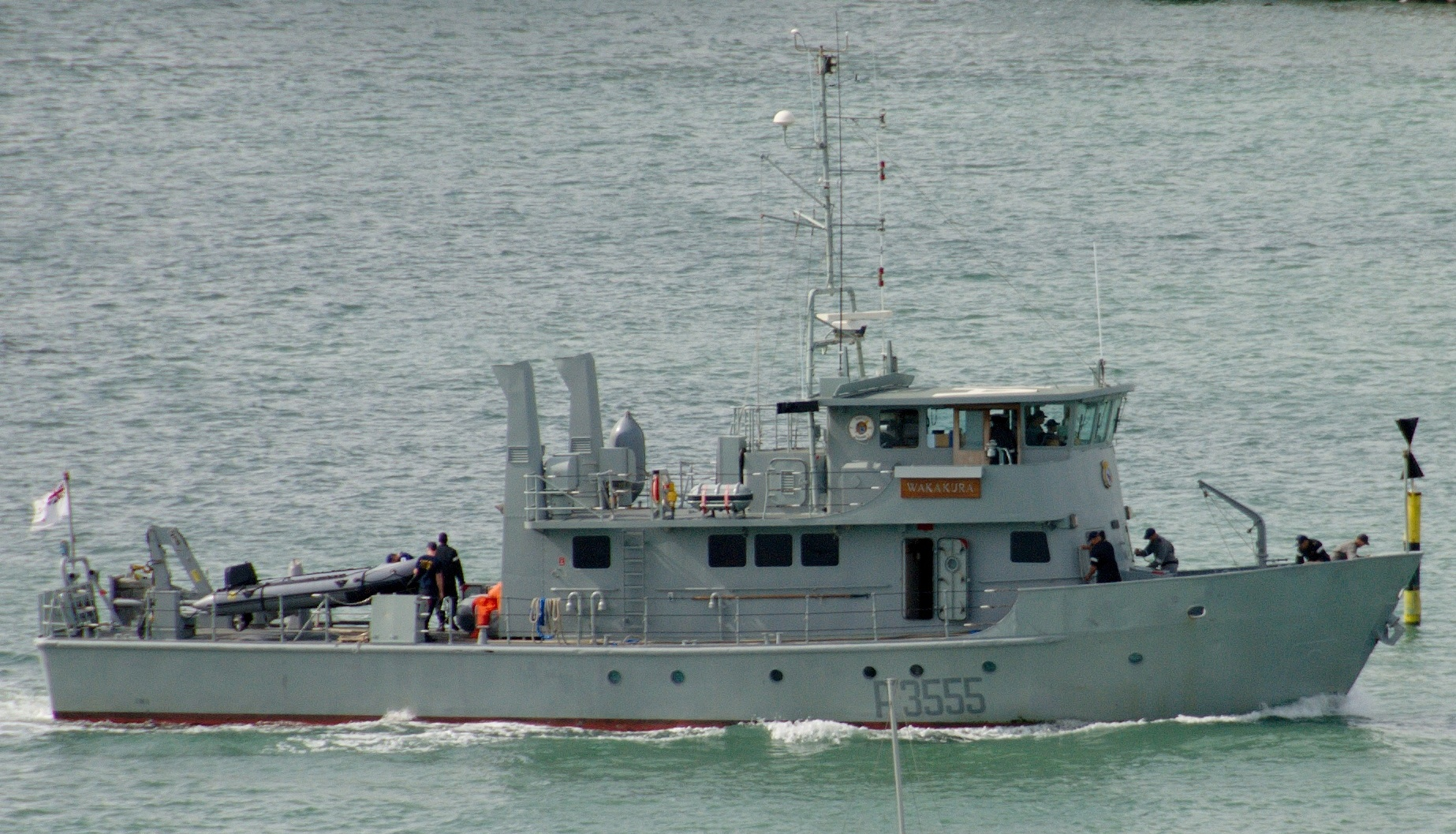
- HMNZS Wakakura in Devonport

History

New Zealand
- Namesake: HMNZS Wakakura (T00)
- Owner: Jason and Clayton Knowles
- Builder: Whangarei Engineering and Construction Company
- Commissioned: 26 March 1985
- Decommissioned: 11 December 2007
- Home port: Auckland
- Fate: Decommissioned

General characteristics
- Class & type: Moa-class inshore patrol vessel
- Displacement: 91.5 ton standard; 105 ton full load
- Length: 27 m (89 ft)
- Beam: 6.1 m (20 ft)
- Draught: 2.4 m (7 ft 10 in)
- Propulsion: Two Cummins diesels (710 hp) Twin shafts
- Speed: 12 knots (22 km/h; 14 mph)
- Range: 3,000 nmi (5,600 km; 3,500 mi)
- Complement: 18: 5 Officers: 3 Senior Rates: 10 Ratings
- Sensors & processing systems: Navigation Radar Racal Decca 916 I Band
- Armament: 1 × 12.7mm MG

HMNZS Wakakura (P3555) was a Moa-class inshore patrol vessel of the Royal New Zealand Navy. It was commissioned in March 1985 for the Naval Volunteer Reserve.

== Service ==
Wakakura was attached to the Wellington division of the Naval Volunteer Reserve from her commissioning until 2005, when she returned to the fleet base in Auckland.

Wakakura, in company with Kiwi, carried out farewell manoeuvres on 29 November 2007, flying a paying-off pennant, in Waitemata Harbour prior to decommissioning on 11 December 2007.

Wakakura was the second ship of this name to serve in the New Zealand Navy. The first ship was the training minesweeper HMNZS Wakakura (T00) (1926–1947). Wakakura is a Māori word which could mean "precious canoe" or could mean "training boat".

== Decommissioning ==
After decommissioning the Wakakura was put up for sale by tender. The vessel was acquired by the owner of Helipro, Rick Lucas, under the Lucas Family Trust. With the receivership of Helipro in 2014, the vessel was sold in February 2015 to Jason and Clayton Knowles and moved from Queens Wharf Wellington to the Marlborough Sounds. As of 2020 HMNZS Wakakura (P3555) remains tied to a jetty in Kaipapa Bay in the Marlborough Sounds at 41°13'36.5"S 174°04'37.2"E. In July 2022, the ship was purchased by Maria Kuster and Sean Liam Ellis who own and operate Pure Salt; a charter company who operate the sister ship "Flightless". M.V. Flightless is based in the coastal waters of Fiordland and Stewart Island. It is understood Wakakura will operate as a charter vessel for Pure Salt.

== See also ==
- Patrol boats of the Royal New Zealand Navy
