= HMNZS Moa (P3553) =

History

New Zealand
- Namesake: HMNZS Moa (T233)
- Owner: Maria Kuster & Sean Ellis
- Operator: Pure Salt
- Builder: Whangarei Engineering and Construction Company
- Commissioned: 28 Nov 1983
- Decommissioned: 23 Jan 2007
- Renamed: Flightless
- Identification: IMO number: 8648793; MMSI number: 512000550; Callsign: ZMG2121
- Fate: Sold to private ownership

General characteristics
- Class & type: Moa-class inshore patrol vessel
- Displacement: 91.5 ton standard; 105 ton full load
- Length: 27 m (89 ft)
- Beam: 6.1 m (20 ft)
- Draught: 2.4 m (7 ft 10 in)
- Propulsion: Two Cummins diesels (710 hp) Twin shafts
- Speed: 12 knots (22 km/h; 14 mph)
- Range: 3,000 nmi (5,600 km; 3,500 mi)
- Complement: 18: 5 Officers: 3 Senior Rates: 10 Ratings
- Sensors & processing systems: Navigation Radar Racal Decca 916 I Band
- Armament: 1 × 12.7mm MG

HMNZS Moa (P3553) was a Moa-class inshore patrol vessel of the Royal New Zealand Navy. It was commissioned in 1983 for the Naval Volunteer Reserve and decommissioned in 2007.

Moa was the second ship of this name to serve in the Royal New Zealand Navy and was named after the moa bird from New Zealand.

After she was decommissioned in January 2007, she was sold on in March to a Picton builder who renamed the vessel Flightless. On Friday 20 June 2008 the vessel, moored at anchor on the eastern side of Waikawa Bay, Picton, was struck by a commercial fishing boat, with the loss of two lives aboard the fishing boat. After an extensive refit Flightless is now owned by Pure Salt Ltd and operates as an expedition vessel, providing adventure charters in Fiordland & Stewart Island.

== See also ==
- Patrol boats of the Royal New Zealand Navy
