= SS Walnut =

Refugee ship

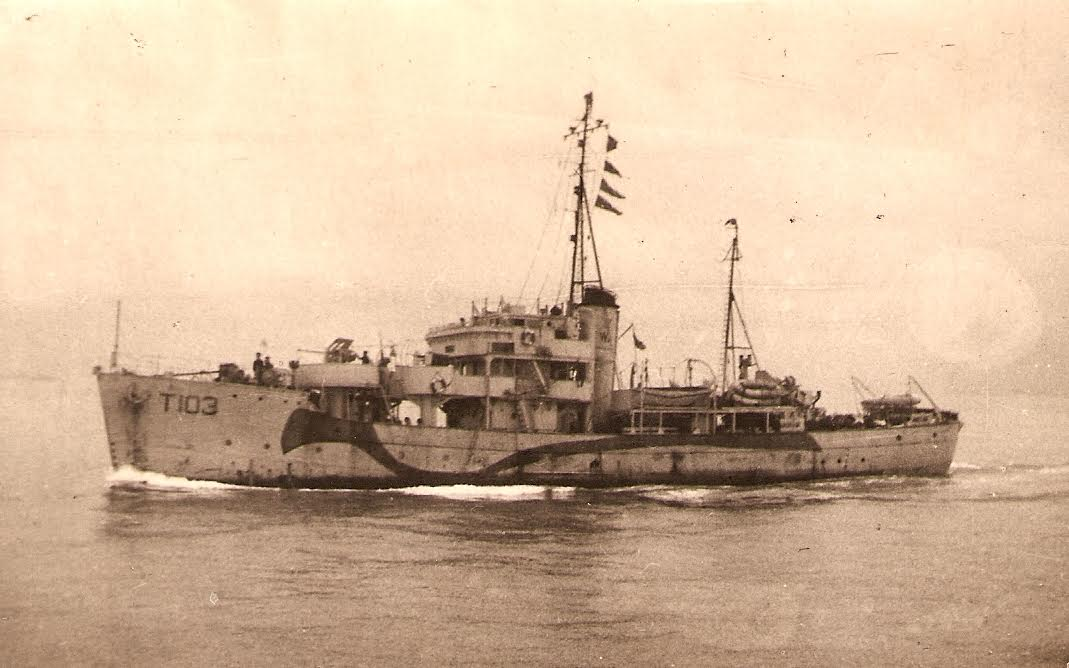
- HMS Walnut, T103 in WW2 Royal Navy configuration

History

United Kingdom
- Name: HMS Walnut
- Builder: Smiths Dock Company, South Bank, Middlesbrough
- Yard number: 755
- Laid down: June 15, 1939
- Launched: August 12, 1939
- Completed: December 31, 1939
- Identification: Pennant number T103
- Fate: Sold to Stem Olson Company Limited 1948
- Notes: Source: Miramar Ship Information Database, Record No. 5185985
- Name: SS Walnut
- Owner: Stem Olson Company Limited
- Port of registry: Gothenburg, Sweden
- Acquired: 1948
- Fate: Sold to Compania Maritima Walnut S/A in 1948
- Name: SS Walnut
- Owner: Compania Maritima Walnut S/A
- Port of registry: Panama City, Panama
- Acquired: 1948
- Fate: Court Auction in 1949, Salvaged, Sold to Borromee Verreault Company 1951
- Notes: Source: "Ship Statistics", SS Walnut 1948 – Voyaged to Freedom
- Name: Keta
- Owner: Borromee Verreault Company
- Port of registry: (Canada) Halifax, Nova Scotia
- Fate: Broken up Les Méchins, Quebec, December 1976 by Nittolo Metal Company
- Notes: Source: Miramar Ship Information Database, Record No. 5185985

General characteristics
- Class & type: Tree-class trawler
- Displacement: 545 tons
- Length: 164 ft (50 m)
- Beam: 27 ft 8 in (8.43 m)
- Draught: 11 ft 1 in (3.38 m) (mean)
- Propulsion: One triple expansion reciprocating engine, 1 shaft, 850 ihp (630 kW)
- Speed: 12.25 knots (22.69 km/h; 14.10 mph)
- Complement: 40 (as naval ship)
- Crew: 18 (as civilian ship)
- Armament: 1 × QF 12-pounder (76 mm) anti-aircraft gun; 3 × 20 mm Oerlikon AA guns; 30 × depth charges

SS Walnut was a refugee ship converted from a British minesweeping Tree-class trawler which carried Baltic refugees from Sweden to Canada in 1948. The refugees' arrival at Pier 21 in Halifax, Nova Scotia led to a controversy which played an important role in shaping Canada's postwar refugee policies.

Initially entering service during the Second World War as HMS Walnut, the trawler was sold for commercial purposes following the war. Converted for use as a cargo ship, the vessel retained the name Walnut until 1959 when sold and renamed Keta. The ship was broken up in 1976.

== Design and description ==
Tree-class trawlers were designed to displace 545 tons standard and 770 tons at deep load. They were 164 feet (50 m) long overall with a beam of 27 feet 8 inches (8.43 m) and a draught of 11 feet 1 inch (3.38 m). They were powered by a one-cylinder boiler providing steam to one vertical triple expansion engine. This droved one shaft creating 850 indicated horsepower (630 kW) and giving the ship a maximum speed of 12.25 knots (22.69 km/h; 14.10 mph). The ship could carry 183 tons of coal.

The Tree class was armed with one QF 12-pounder (76 mm) gun, three 20 mm Oerlikon anti-aircraft guns and 30 depth charges. The trawlers had a complement of 40.

== Royal Navy service ==
Walnut was laid down on June 15, 1939 as HMS Walnut (T103) by Smiths Dock Company at South Bank, Middlesbrough with the yard number 1031, one of 20 Tree-class trawlers built for the British Royal Navy. Walnut was launched on August 12, 1939 and completed on December 13, 1939. Walnut belonged to a group of ten minesweepers commanded by New Zealanders in the 24th and 25th anti-submarine and minesweeping flotillas, protecting convoys on the east coast of Britain where they faced numerous German air and sea attacks. Walnut's commander, Gordon Bridson, received the Distinguished Service Cross for his performance while in command of Walnut. By the end of 1946, Walnut was one of only two Tree-class trawlers still in service with the Royal Navy. Both were sold in 1948.

== Refugee ship ==
Walnut was first purchased by the Swedish firm Stem Olson and converted to a coastal cargo ship. In September 1948 the ship was purchased by a group of refugees from several Baltic countries who pooled their life savings to form a company called "Compania Maritima Walnut S/A". The refugees had fled to Sweden after the Soviet occupation of the Baltic republics. The uncertainty of their status in Sweden and fears that they would be forcibly repatriated to the Soviets led the refugees to search for ships which could take them to another country that might offer secure refuge. Walnut was registered under the Panama flag to avoid Swedish restrictions on passenger capacity and hastily converted to accommodate 200 passengers.

The ship sailed from Gothenburg, Sweden on November 13, 1948 and stopped at Lysekil, Sweden to complete the embarkation of passengers and supplies before a final departure on November 17. Walnut carried 347 passengers, mostly Estonians, but also Latvians, Lithuanians, Finns, Austrians, and Polish refugees. Walnut stopped at Sligo, Ireland to load coal before crossing the Atlantic. Designed for a civilian crew of 18 or a military crew of 40, the 347 passengers endured a difficult voyage in bad weather, battling leaks and seasickness but arrived safely at Sydney, Nova Scotia on December 10 where food and more coal were taken aboard before the ship resumed its voyage for the Canadian immigration terminal at Pier 21 in Halifax, Nova Scotia.

== Canadian reaction ==
Walnut arrived at Halifax on December 13. The small ship was among the smallest to ever call at the Pier 21 immigration terminal, dwarfed by the giant four stacker RMS Aquitania which arrived at the same pier a few days later with 1,656 passengers. Walnut presented Halifax immigration officials with a dilemma. The passengers aboard had arrived in Canada without permission or clearance, one of a series of small ships carrying Baltic refugees, nicknamed "The Viking Ships", which suddenly arrived in Canada in the fall of 1948. Others included the ships Gladstone, Sarabande, Parnu, Ostervag, Capry, and Amanda. Walnut had the largest number aboard and became the focus of public and official attention over the fate of the refugees. The Baltic refugees had tried to come to Canada through official channels but were frustrated by the long delay and barriers in Canada's immigration system which left them vulnerable to a forced return to the Soviet controlled Baltic republics. Walnut's passengers were detained, some at Halifax's Rockhead prison and others in the detention quarters at the Pier 21 immigration terminal.

However, the plight of the refugees soon attracted considerable support, especially as they arrived close to Christmas. The Halifax West End Baptist Church presented the refugees in detention with a radio for entertainment and organized a Christmas carol concert on December 21. A variety of civic groups led by the mayor of Halifax John E. Ahern banded together to present a Christmas concert and gifts to the refugees on Christmas Eve. Local seamstresses assembled a costume to represent an Estonian version of Santa Claus, Youluvana, for the captain of Walnut to wear as he gave presents to all the children aboard including silver dollars given the youngest child; the oldest refugee and the mother of the largest family meant to mark the "start of the wealth they would accumulate when they were allowed to settle in Canada".

Public pressure and widespread press attention made Canadian immigration officials investigate and consider each passenger's background. In the end, Canada admitted all but two passengers from Walnut, waiving the immigration restrictions of the time by issuing an Order in Council for each individual. The two individuals denied entry as "security risks" were deported overseas. In January 1949, the Walnut refugees held a farewell party with local immigration officials before leaving by train to settle in various regions of Canada. The arrival of the small ex-warship had pushed Canadian immigration officials to change Canadian immigration intervention and interception policies.

== Later career ==
After Walnut's arrival in Halifax, the ship was detained at the French Cable Wharf in Dartmouth, Nova Scotia. The ship was sold by auction to pay for expenses from the voyage. During the protracted legal process surrounding her refugee passengers, the ship was stripped of its brass fittings by thieves and scuttled in shallow water in Dartmouth. The ship was sold at another auction in 1951 and rebuilt by the Quebec firm Borromee Verreault. Walnut was renamed Keta and worked on the St. Lawrence River and Canadian Arctic until 1967 or 68. The ship was scrapped in 1975 at Les Méchins.

== Commemoration ==
Passengers who arrived aboard Walnut and their families remained in contact and organized several re-unions. Many shared photographs to remember their journey which were featured in a display at the Pier 21 museum which opened in the former immigration terminal in 1999. When the Pier 21 museum reopened as national museum, the Canadian Museum of Immigration at Pier 21 in 2014, Walnut was featured in an interactive video which presents visitors with the 1948 Walnut controversy and asks them how they would have responded.
