= HMNZS Tui =

The name HMNZS Tui may apply to:

- HMNZS Tui (T234), a minesweeper commissioned 1941–1967
- HMNZS Tui (1970), an oceanographic research ship commissioned 1970–1998
