= Torpedo Bay Navy Museum =

Naval history museum

National Museum of the Royal New Zealand Navy Te Waka Huia o Te Taua Moana O Aotearoa
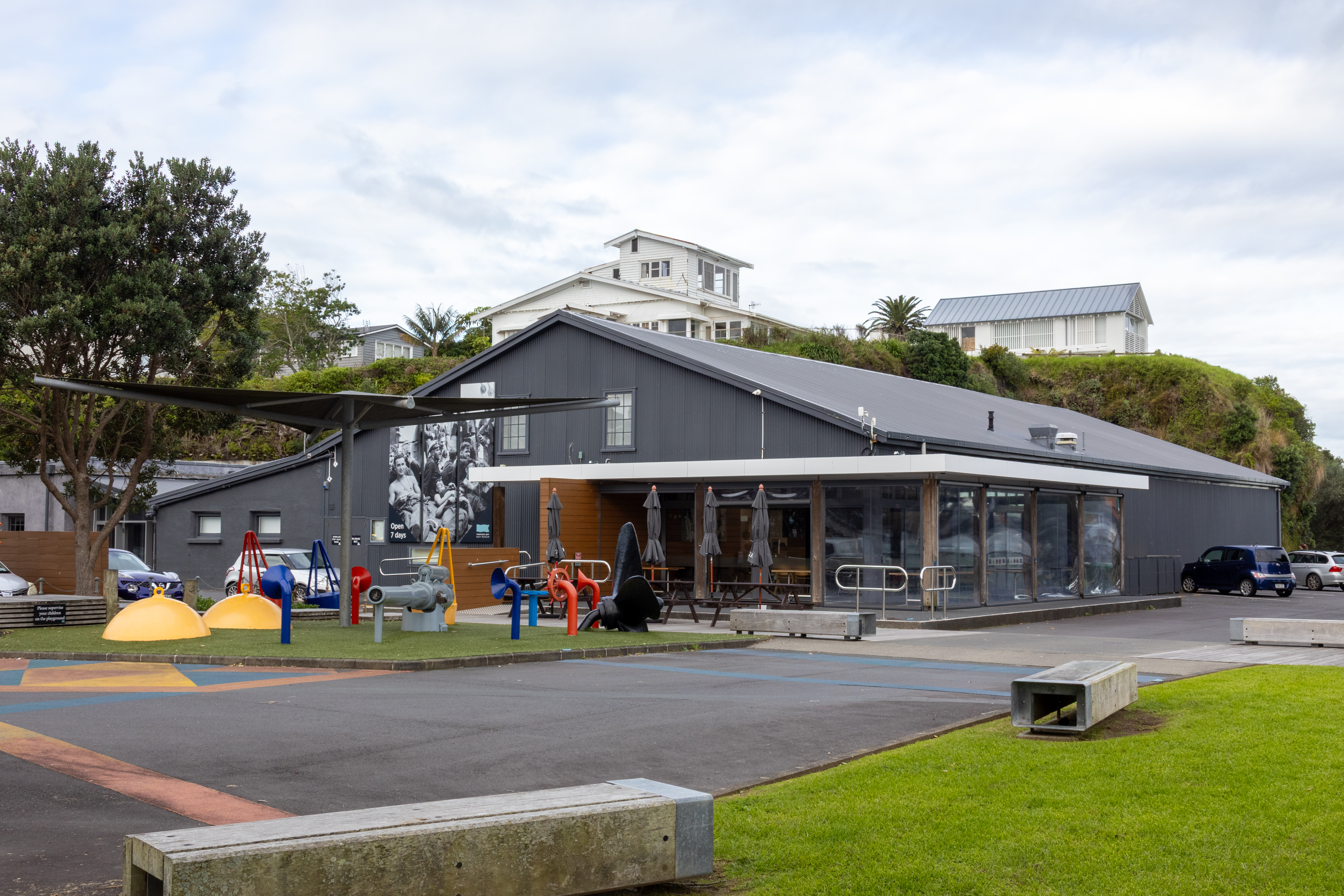
- The Torpedo Bay Navy Museum in 2025
- Established: 9 October 2010
- Location: Devonport, New Zealand
- Coordinates: 36.8287°S 174.8093°E
- Type: Naval history
- Website: navymuseum.co.nz

The Torpedo Bay Navy Museum is the official museum of the Royal New Zealand Navy. Located in Devonport, Auckland, it opened in 2010 to replace an earlier naval museum.

== History ==
The first Royal New Zealand Navy (RNZN) museum was established in 1974 and was housed in a single room within HMNZS Philomel, the navy's main administrative facility at Devonport. It was only open to RNZN personnel for two hours per week, though groups visiting the base could also view the museum by appointment. In 1982 the Royal New Zealand Navy Museum was moved to a small building on Spring Street at the edge of HMNZS Philomel. This building proved too small, however.

On 9 October 2010 the RNZN Museum moved to larger premises at Torpedo Bay in Devonport. It is housed in buildings which were constructed in 1896 to control naval mines at the mouth of Waitematā Harbour. These buildings were refurbished at a cost of $NZ 1.5 million.

== Exhibits ==
The exhibits on display at the Torpedo Bay Navy Museum trace New Zealand's naval history since the Flagstaff War in 1845.

One of the first displays covers the New Zealand-funded British battlecruiser HMS New Zealand, and includes the piupiu (Māori warrior's skirt) which was presented to the ship's commanding officer during the vessel's visit to New Zealand in 1913. The piupiu was worn by the battlecruiser's captains in battle during World War I as a good luck charm.

Displays on World War II cover topics such as the cruiser HMNZS Achilles and the battle fought between the small minesweepers HMNZS Kiwi and HMNZS Moa and the larger Japanese submarine I-1 on 29 January 1943 off the island of Guadalcanal.

The museum also has displays on the RNZN's role in the Korean War, Malayan Emergency, Vietnam War, Gulf War, and the War in Afghanistan, as well as the navy's contribution to the New Zealand peacekeeping force which was deployed during the Yugoslav Wars. Other displays cover the RNZN's peacetime roles of fisheries protection, search and rescue, disaster relief, and conducting hydrographic surveys.
