= HMNZS Kiwi (P3554) =

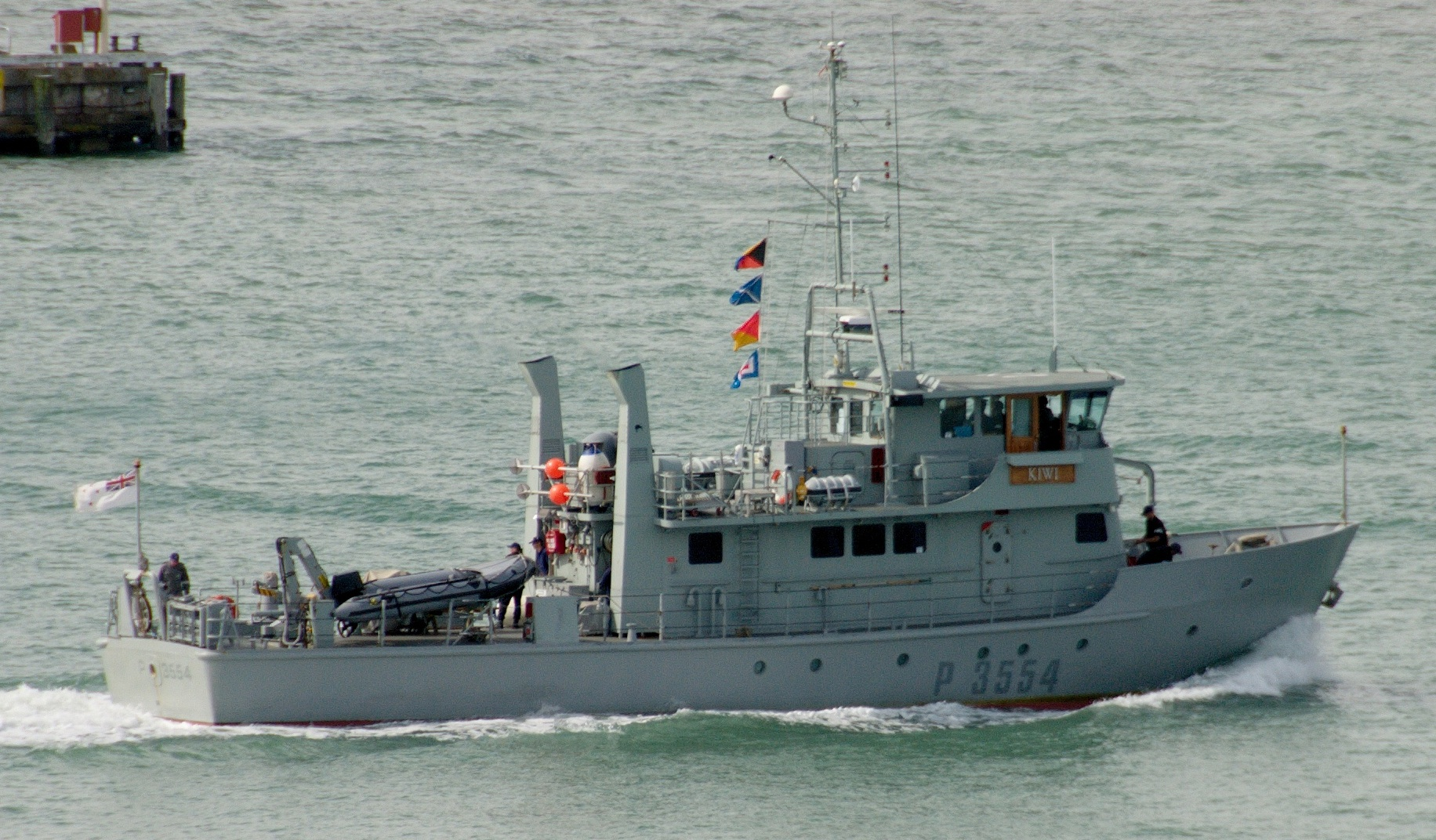
- HMNZS Kiwi in Devonport

History

New Zealand
- Namesake: HMNZS Kiwi (T102)
- Builder: Whangarei Engineering and Construction Company
- Commissioned: 2 September 1984
- Decommissioned: 11 December 2007
- Home port: Lyttelton
- Fate: Sold to private ownership

General characteristics
- Class & type: Moa-class inshore patrol vessel
- Displacement: 91.5 ton standard; 105 ton full load
- Length: 27 m (89 ft)
- Beam: 6.1 m (20 ft)
- Draught: 2.4 m (7 ft 10 in)
- Propulsion: Two Cummins diesels (710 hp) Twin shafts
- Speed: 12 knots (22 km/h; 14 mph)
- Range: 3,000 nmi (5,600 km; 3,500 mi)
- Complement: 18: 5 Officers: 3 Senior Rates: 10 Ratings
- Sensors & processing systems: Navigation Radar Racal Decca 916 I Band
- Armament: 1 × 12.7mm MG

HMNZS Kiwi (P3554) was a Moa-class inshore patrol vessel of the Royal New Zealand Navy. It was commissioned in 1983 for the Naval Volunteer Reserve. Kiwi had been attached to the Christchurch division of the Naval Volunteer Reserve from her commissioning until relocating to Auckland in 2006.

Kiwi, in company with Wakakura, carried out farewell manoeuvres on 29 November 2007, flying a paying-off pennant, in Waitemata Harbour prior to decommissioning on 11 December 2007.

As of 2009 the ship was privately owned and renamed Sarasu. Was seen at Melbourne in 2015, and was actively sailing in 2017.

Kiwi was the second ship of this name to serve in the Royal New Zealand Navy and is named after the national bird of New Zealand.

== See also ==
- Patrol boats of the Royal New Zealand Navy
