= HMNZS Kiwi =

Ship name

HMNZS Kiwi may refer to:

- HMNZS Kiwi (T102), a minesweeper commissioned in 1941
- HMNZS Kiwi (P3554), a patrol boat commissioned in 1983
