= HMNZS Moa =

The name HMNZS Moa may apply to:

- HMNZS Moa (T233), a minesweeper commissioned in 1941
- HMNZS Moa (P3553), a patrol boat commissioned in 1983
