= HMNZS Hinau =

HMNZS Hinau has been the name of two ships of the Royal New Zealand Navy:

- HMNZS Hinau (T17), commissioned 1942 and decommissioned 1945.
- HMNZS Hinau (P3556), commissioned 1985 and decommissioned 23 January 2007.
