= KIVY =

KIVY may refer to:

- KIVY (AM), a radio station (1290 AM) licensed to serve Crockett, Texas, United States
- KIVY-FM, a radio station (92.7 FM) licensed to serve Crockett
- KIVY-LD, a low-power television station (channel 17, virtual 16) licensed to serve Crockett
- Kivy (framework), an open source Python library for developing mobile apps
- Peter Kivy (born 1934), American musicologist

== See also ==
- Kivi (disambiguation)
- Kiwi (disambiguation)
