= HMNZS Tarapunga =

History

New Zealand (RNZN)
- Builder: Whangarei Engineering and Construction Company
- Commissioned: 1980
- Decommissioned: 8 June 2000
- Identification: MMSI number: 512004164; Callsign: ZMLQ

General characteristics
- Class & type: Modified Moa class inshore patrol vessel
- Displacement: 91.5 ton standard; 105 ton full load
- Length: 27 m (89 ft)
- Beam: 6.1 m (20 ft)
- Draught: 2.4 m (7.9 ft)
- Propulsion: Two Cummins diesels (710 hp) Twin shafts
- Speed: 12 knots (22 km/h)
- Range: 3,000 nautical miles (5,600 km)

HMNZS Tarapunga was a modified Moa-class inshore patrol vessel of the Royal New Zealand Navy (RNZN).

She was built by 1980 by the Whangarei Engineering and Construction Company as a version re-engineered for use as an inshore survey vessel.

After decommissioning, she was purchased by North American owners and appeared in Harper's Island Episode 1, as the charter boat that brings the wedding party to the island. She also appeared in season 2, episode 9 of Psych in 2007.

== See also ==
- Survey ships of the Royal New Zealand Navy
