= HMNZS Tui (1970) =

Conrad class oceanographic ship

Coordinates: 35.5832°S 174.5394°E

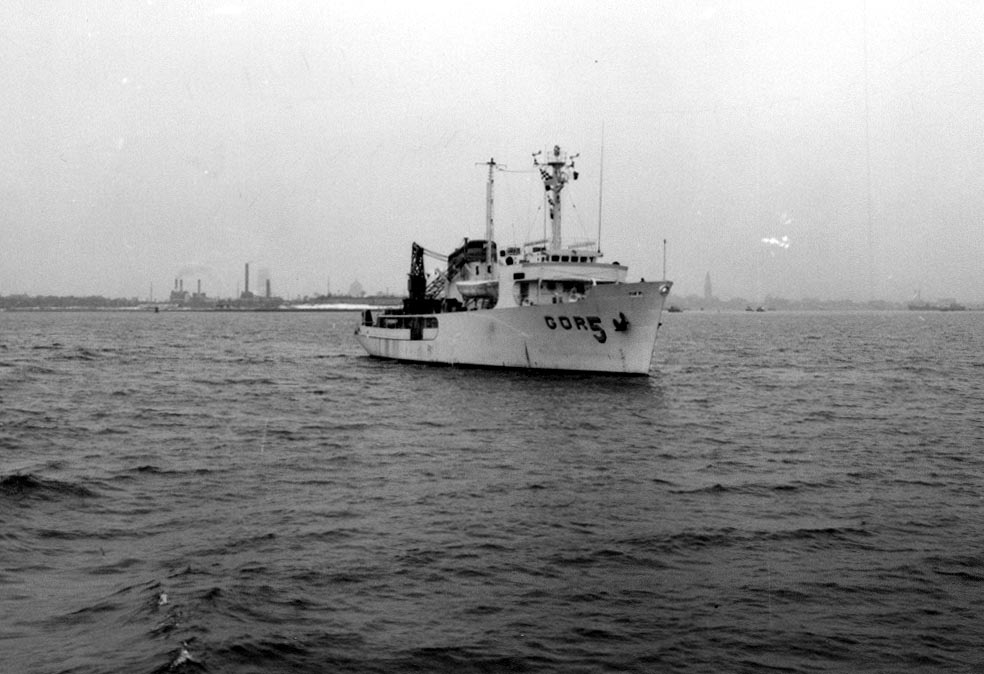
- Charles H. Davis underway in Boston Harbor, 30 January 1963, five days after being placed in service

History

United States
- Name: USNS Charles H. Davis
- Namesake: Rear Admiral Charles Henry Davis
- Builder: Christy Corporation, Sturgeon Bay, Wisconsin
- Laid down: 15 June 1961
- Launched: 30 June 1962
- Christened: 30 June 1962
- Commissioned: 25 January 1963
- Fate: Transferred to RNZN

History

New Zealand (RNZN)
- Name: HMNZS Tui
- Namesake: The Tūī bird
- Commissioned: 11 September 1970
- Decommissioned: 1997
- Fate: Sunk as dive wreck, 1999

General characteristics
- Class & type: Conrad class oceanographic ship
- Displacement: 1,200 tons standard; 1,380 tons full load
- Length: 63.7 m (209 ft)
- Beam: 11.4 m (37 ft)
- Draught: 4.7 m (15 ft)
- Propulsion: 1-shaft diesel electric, 10,000 bhp (7400 kW); one 620 hp (420kW =*6.5 kts) gas engine housed in the funnel for quiet running during sound experiments; 175 hp bow thruster
- Speed: 13.5 knots (25.0 km/h)
- Complement: (NZ) 36 plus up to 10 scientists

HMNZS Tui, formerly USNS Charles H. Davis (T-AGOR-5), was one of nine Conrad class oceanographic ships built for the United States Navy (USN), that later saw service in the Royal New Zealand Navy (RNZN). Serving with the USN from 1963 to 1970, these ships were designed to perform acoustic experiments on sound transmission underwater, and for gravity, magnetism and deep-ocean floor studies.

The ship was recommissioned into the RNZN in late 1970, and as HMNZS Tui served as an oceanographic survey and research ship until her decommissioning in 1997. In 1999, the ship was scuttled as a dive wreck.

== Construction ==
The fourth ship to be so named by the Navy, Charles H. Davis (T-AGOR-5) was laid down by Christy Corporation in Sturgeon Bay, Wisconsin, 30 June 1962; launched 30 June 1962; sponsored by Mrs. Roy Alexander Gano, wife of Admiral Roy Alexander Gano, Commander MSTS; delivered to the Navy 25 January 1963 and turned over to the Military Sea Transportation Service (MSTS) 25 January 1963.

== Operational history ==
=== RNZN ===
In 1970, she was transferred to the RNZN, and was commissioned on 11 September 1970 as HMNZS Tui. Tui was named after the Tūī bird, and was the second of two ships with this name to serve in the RNZN.

After a partial refit and the installation and testing of scientific equipment, Tui began a program of work for the Defence Scientific Establishment in Auckland. For years Tui went unobtrusively about the kind of work she was designed for, primarily underwater acoustics.

Tui worked in Australian, Indian Ocean and South Pacific waters. She worked on Auckland University research, with DSIR scientists, and with other oceanographic ships. Tui also took part in several American research programs. Her acoustic research was mainly to do with the detection and tracking of submarines.

During the 1970s she made an extensive search for the Maria Theresa Reef.

== Decommissioning and fate ==
In 1997, Tui was decommissioned and was replaced by the hydrographic ship HMNZS Resolution.

In February 1999, Tui was scuttled 2 kilometres (1.2 mi) from Tutukaka Heads to serve as a tourist attraction and wreck for divers, following a period of work on her which removed any objects in danger of breaking free and welding shut any areas that may have posed a hazard for wreck divers. Her anchor was presented to the City of Napier.

== See also ==
- Survey ships of the Royal New Zealand Navy
