= Kiwi River =

Coordinates: 42.629350°S 172.246204°E

Location
- Country: New Zealand

Physical characteristics
- Mouth
  - location: Hope River
- Length: 8 km (5.0 mi)

The Kiwi River is a river of New Zealand's South Island. One of the headwaters of the Hope River, it flows generally northwest from its source within Lake Sumner Forest Park, 4 kilometres (2.5 mi) north of Lake Sumner.

There are numerous other smaller watercourses in New Zealand called "Kiwi stream" or "Kiwi creek".

== See also ==
- List of rivers of New Zealand
