= Iikka Kivi =

Finnish comedian (born 1986)

Iikka Kivi (born 1986 in Ylivieska, Finland) is a Finnish stand up comedian and scriptwriter. Currently living in Oulu, Kivi has worked as a stand up comedian since 2012. He rose to national publicity in 2014 after winning the Naurun tasapaino competition organised by YLE TV2. Kivi has later worked as a producer of stand up comedy festivals and wrote scripts for the satire shows Noin viikon uutiset and Yle Leaks. He is also known as a provocative communal speaker. On his gigs, Kivi almost never makes jokes about communal matters, but instead spreads political jokes on social media.

Iikka Kivi spent his childhood in Ylivieska and has graduated as a medianomist from the Oulu University of Applied Sciences. Before his career as a comedian, he had worked as columnist and a literary critic. According to Kivi, he was bullied in primary school and had later suffered from depression and burn-out at work. He has said he had previously been a racist supporter of Jussi Halla-aho and the Finns Party, spreading anti-immigrant hatred on the Internet. According to Kivi, he left the movement for good in June 2015, when Member of Parliament Olli Immonen, whom he had voted for, appeared in a photograph together with members of the Neo-Nazi organisation Finnish Resistance Movement. Kivi has also said he had felt guilt for the rise of the Finns Party and anti-immigration sentiment.

In connection with the Me Too movement in autumn 2017 Kivi told he had been guilty of sexual harassment in his childhood and youth. On the sixth grade (last grade of the lower stage) in primary school, it had been a gang of boys squeezing the bottoms of girls, and later verbal abuse during his youth. Currently Kivi identifies as a feminist. In 2017 he left the Vuosisadan suomalainen stand up tour because no women participated in it. As a controversy arose from the matter, the tour was joined by four female comedians and one transsexual one, after which Kivi rejoined the tour. In 2018 Kivi published a book called Menisit ennemmin terapiaan, parodying coping guides.

In spring 2019 Iikka Kivi started as a columnist in Helsingin Sanomat. In September the same year Kivi quit his job as a columnist as a protest against a propaganda advertisement of the Chinese government published on the front page. The advertisement was clearly separate of the editorial content but still raised a great deal of discussion both for it and against it.

== Bibliography ==
- Menisit ennemmin terapiaan: rehellinen self help -kirja. Helsinki: Kosmos, 2018. ISBN 978-952-71446-1-9.
