= HMNZS Hinau (P3556) =

New Zealand navy vessel

History

New Zealand
- Name: Hinau
- Builder: Whangarei Engineering and Construction Company
- Commissioned: 4 October 1985
- Decommissioned: 23 January 2007
- Renamed: Sea Patroller
- Identification: IMO number: 9089633; MMSI number: 512000183; Callsign: ZMSP

General characteristics
- Class & type: Moa-class inshore patrol vessel
- Displacement: 91.5 ton standard; 105 ton full load
- Length: 27 m (88 ft 7 in)
- Beam: 6.1 m (20 ft 0 in)
- Draught: 2.4 m (7 ft 10 in)
- Propulsion: Two Cummins diesels (710 hp) Twin shafts
- Speed: 12 knots (22 km/h; 14 mph)
- Range: 3,000 nmi (5,600 km; 3,500 mi)
- Complement: 18
- Armament: 1 × 12.7 mm machine gun

HMNZS Hinau (P3556) was a Moa-class inshore patrol vessel of the Royal New Zealand Navy. It was commissioned in 1985 for the Naval Volunteer Reserve and decommissioned in 2007. Hinau was the second ship with this name to serve in the Royal New Zealand Navy. The name comes from the forest tree Elaeocarpus dentatus which is native to New Zealand.

== Construction and career ==
Hinau was commissioned on 4 October 1985.

As of 2025, the ship is sailing in active use (by a civilian organization not Royal New Zealand Navy) and is known as Seapatroller (Sea Patroller etc.). It patrols Cook Strait cables.

== See also ==
- Patrol boats of the Royal New Zealand Navy

== Bibliography ==
- Saunders, Stephen, ed. (2004). Jane's Fighting Ships 2004–2005. Coulsdon, UK: Jane's Information Group. ISBN 0-7106-2623-1.
