= Kivi Larmola =

Finnish comics artist and illustrator (born 1966)

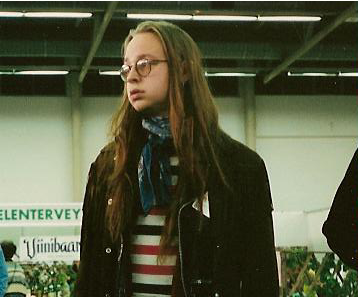
Kivi Larmola

Kivi Larmola (born 1966) is a Finnish comics artist, illustrator, translator, freelance journalist and a musician. His subject matter often reflects on the absurdities of everyday life and he has a particular interest and affinity to the urban rock music scene as a lifestyle.

Larmola was born in Helsinki, and has been a professional comic artist since 1986, though his earliest work was published in the late 1970s. He received the most prestigious comics-related award, Puupäähattu, in 1991. He served on the board of the Finnish Comics Society from 1991 to 1992, and was the editor-in-chief of Sarjainfo (the Finnish equivalent of Comics Journal). His work has been exhibited both nationally in Finland and abroad.

Larmola has also played guitar in numerous rock bands, including Sekunda, Lunatunes, and Kätyrit. He has also written and published a guidebook for 'the touring musician' (Rokkibändin ABC : käytännön opas keikkailevalle muusikolle) in 2004.

== Collected works ==
- 1991 Pieni taivas
- 1992 Kytkijät
- 1994 Lasikuula
- 1996 Parkkipaikka auringossa
- 1997 Saippuaa
