= HMNZS Takapu =

History

New Zealand (RNZN)
- Builder: Whangarei Engineering and Construction Company
- Commissioned: 1980
- Decommissioned: 8 June 2000
- Identification: IMO number: 8975639; Hull number: A07

General characteristics
- Class & type: Modified Moa class inshore patrol vessel
- Displacement: 91.5 ton standard; 105 ton full load
- Length: 27 m (89 ft)
- Beam: 6.1 m (20 ft)
- Draught: 2.4 m (7.9 ft)
- Propulsion: Two Cummins diesels (710 hp) Twin shafts
- Speed: 12 knots (22 km/h)
- Range: 3,000 nautical miles (5,600 km)

HMNZS Takapu was a modified Moa class inshore patrol vessel of the Royal New Zealand Navy (RNZN).

She was built by 1980 by the Whangarei Engineering and Construction Company as a version re-engineered for use as an inshore survey vessel.

HMNZS Takapu completed service in 2000 and was sold into private ownership. The vessel was converted for private use following an extensive refit. HMNZS Takapu was renamed Takapu 2 following her decommissioning from the Royal New Zealand Navy.

== Private Ownership ==
Following her time in the Royal New Zealand Navy, she was purchased by an Auckland family and put into commercial charter. During this time the vessel was transformed into a luxury vessel and travelled throughout the Pacific.

The ship was again sold in 2017 to another Auckland family. She was berthed in the Viaduct marina for the 25 years from 2000 until 2025.

As of 2026, the ship is up for sale.

== See also ==
- Survey ships of the Royal New Zealand Navy
