= Bird-class minesweeper =

Bird class
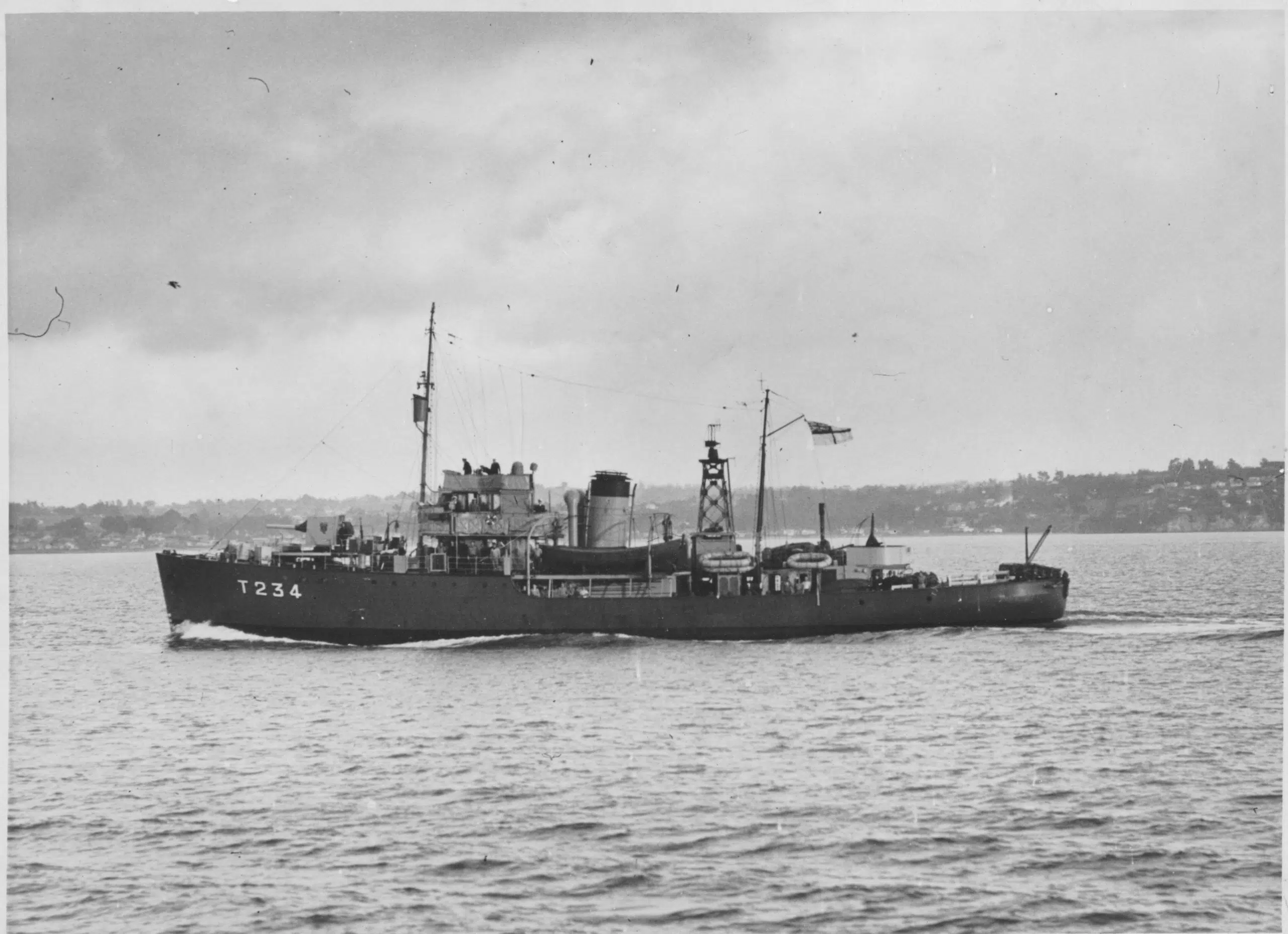
- HMNZS Tui in 1944

Class overview
- Name: Bird class
- Builders: Henry Robb Ltd, Scotland.
- Operators: Royal New Zealand Navy
- Succeeded by: Isles class
- In service: 1941–1967
- Completed: 3
- Lost: 1
- Retired: 2

General characteristics
- Type: Minesweeper
- Displacement: 607 long tons (617 t) (standard); 923 long tons (938 t) (full load)
- Length: 168 ft (51 m) overall; 157.5 ft (48.0 m) keel
- Beam: 30 ft (9.1 m)
- Draught: 15.3 ft (4.7 m)
- Propulsion: 1,100 ihp (820 kW) oil
- Speed: 13 knots (24 km/h; 15 mph)
- Complement: 33–35
- Sensors & processing systems: ASDIC
- Armament: 1 × 4 inch gun; 2 × 1 Hotchkiss guns; Twin Lewis guns; 40 depth charges

The Bird-class minesweeper was a class of naval trawlers built for the Royal New Zealand Navy and which served during the Second World War. A total of three vessels in the class were built: Kiwi, Moa and Tui. All were named for New Zealand native birds and were also referred to as corvettes.

== Design ==
In late 1939, the New Zealand government contracted Henry Robb Ltd, a Scottish shipbuilding firm, to build three naval trawlers for the New Zealand Division of the Royal Navy. These vessels were intended for training naval personnel in seamanship, gunnery skills and minesweeping work.

Henry Robb Ltd had built the minesweeping trawlers HMS Basset and HMS Mastiff, in 1935 and 1938 respectively, and this experience influenced the design of the Bird-class vessels. Although similar in appearance to the later Isles-class minesweeping trawlers, derived from Basset and Mastiff, the Bird-class ships had an extended forecastle. They were slightly larger and more powerful than the Isles-class minesweepers. Indeed, by 1943, the Bird-class ships were referred to as corvettes when official reports were submitted to the New Zealand parliament.

== Characteristics ==
The ships of the Bird class had a standard displacement of 607 standard tons and when fully loaded displaced 923 standard tons. They were 168 ft (51 m) in total length, 157.5 ft (48.0 m) in length at the keel, had a beam of 30 ft (9.1 m) and a draught of 15.3 ft (4.7 m). The main armament was a 4-inch (102 mm) gun, supplemented with two quick firing 3-pounder Hotchkiss guns and one twin Lewis machine gun. The ships carried ASDIC and 40 depth charges. Propulsion was through a single-shaft reciprocating steam engine that burned oil, providing a top speed of 13 knots (24 km/h; 15 mph) at 1,100 indicated horsepower (820 kW).

Their design complement was to be between 33 and 35 men, although this increased as the war progressed and the ships were upgraded.

== Construction ==
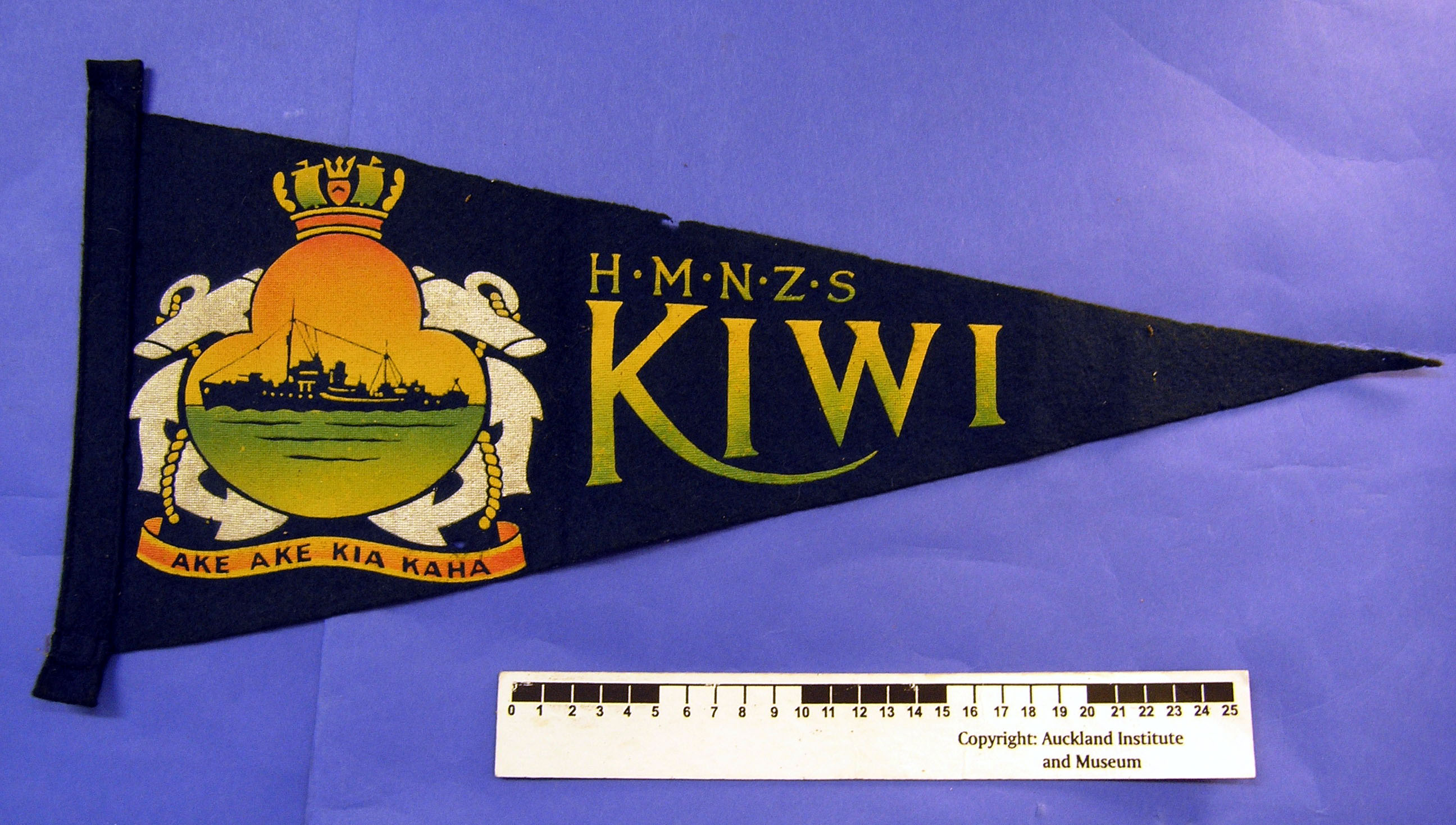
The pennant of Kiwi

The Bird-class vessels were Kiwi, Moa and Tui, all named for native bird species of New Zealand. The three Bird-class vessels, designated build numbers 314 to 316, were laid down on 19 March 1940 with the first of them, Moa, launched on 15 April and completed on 19 August 1941. She had been commissioned into the Royal Navy on 12 August. The second and third ships, Kiwi and Tui respectively, were completed on 28 October and 5 December. They were commissioned directly into the Royal New Zealand Navy (RNZN), which had been formed on 1 October 1941.

== Service history ==
Upon commissioning, each ship worked up in Scotland before being dispatched to New Zealand with the first leg being a North Atlantic crossing as part of an escort to a convoy. They steamed, via the Panama Canal, to the west coast of the United States and then crossed the Pacific with stops at various islands along the way. On arrival in New Zealand, from April (Moa) to August (Tui) 1942, the minesweepers joined the 25th Minesweeping Flotilla. Kiwi's transit of the North Atlantic resulted in some damage and she had to have repairs completed in Boston, Massachusetts.

=== South Pacific duty ===
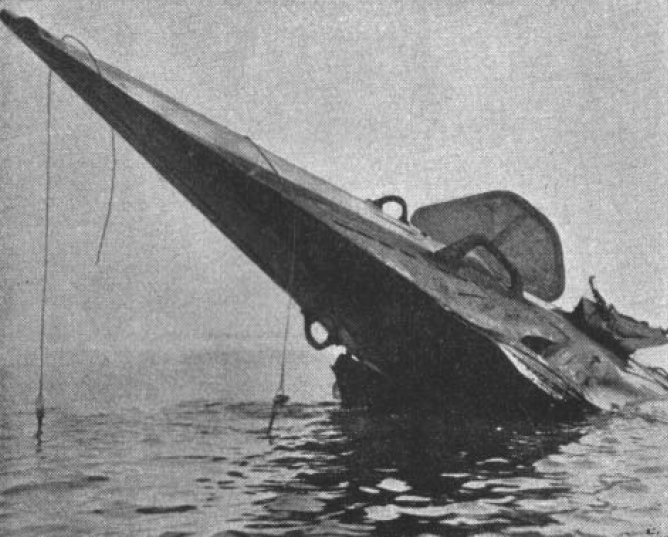
The wreck of the Japanese submarine I-1, sunk by Kiwi and Moa

On 29 January 1943, Kiwi and Moa rammed and wrecked the Japanese submarine I-1, which had surfaced off the coast of Guadalcanal after several depth charges had been dropped. Kiwi's bow had been damaged and she returned to Auckland for repairs. Once completed she went back to the Solomons but not long after her return to service she suffered damage from a friendly fire incident which necessitated more repairs at Auckland.

External videos
- The two converted New Zealand Trawlers that shortened WW2 in The Pacific - YouTube

The flotilla was offered for service in the South Pacific and the offer was accepted by Vice Admiral Robert L. Ghormley the commander of South Pacific. The ships of the flotilla began operations in the Solomon Islands, conducting anti-submarine operations and carrying out escort missions from December 1942. They also disrupted the Japanese supply efforts, destroying a number of landing barges. The ships were considered to have weak defences against attacking aircraft, and they were unofficially up-gunned with 20 mm (0.8 in) Oerlikon guns scrounged from wrecked ships.

In April 1943, Moa was sunk when it was attacked while refuelling at Tulagi Harbour, by Aichi D3A "Val" dive bombers. The attack killed five seamen and wounded another 15. One of the wounded was the captain of Moa, Lieutenant Commander Peter Phipps (later Vice Admiral), who had a bomb penetrate the roof of his cabin and pass through the floor where it exploded beneath him.

On 19 August 1943 Tui with some United States Kingfisher floatplanes jointly sank the Japanese submarine I-17. With her ASDIC, Tui had detected the submarine and depth charged it. Contact with the submarine had then been lost and Tui departed the scene. However, passing Kingfishers directed Tui to the crippled submarine, I-17, which had surfaced some distance away. Tui scored hits with her main gun and these were followed up with depth charges from the US aircraft, resulting in the sinking of I-17. Tui picked up six survivors who confirmed that her earlier depth charge attack had forced the submarine to the surface.

As the Japanese abandoned Guadalcanal and withdrew to the north, the flotilla's area of operations moved as well, to around Bougainville. Both Tui and Kiwi returned to Auckland for refits in 1944 during which the previously unofficial 20 mm Oerlikon guns were made a permanent feature of their armament. The flotilla was released from service in the South Pacific in mid-1945 and returned to New Zealand. After the war, both Kiwi and Tui were involved in clearing the Hauraki Gulf of German-laid mines before being deactivated in 1946.

=== Later service ===
The ships were recommissioned a few years later, Kiwi in 1949 and Tui in 1952, as training vessels for Navy personnel undergoing compulsory military service and then later for men preparing for service with RNZN frigates in the Korean War. Laid up in 1956, Kiwi was scrapped in Auckland in 1964. After ending her military career and having her armament removed, Tui was used as an oceanographic research ship for a number of scientific institutions. She was scrapped in 1969, having been laid up since 1967.

== See also ==
- List of ship classes of the Second World War
