= HMNZS Monowai (A06) =

History

New Zealand
- Namesake: Lake Monowai
- Builder: Grangemouth Dockyard
- Laid down: 1960
- Acquired: 1975
- Commissioned: 1977
- Decommissioned: 1997
- Identification: IMO number: 5237969
- Nickname(s): Ghost of the Coast
- Fate: Scrapped in 2002

General characteristics
- Type: Hydrographic survey vessel
- Displacement: 3,900 tons full load
- Length: 90.8 metres (298 ft) overall; 82.3 metres (270 ft) keel length
- Beam: 14.1 metres (46 ft)
- Draught: 5.2 metres (17 ft)
- Propulsion: 2 x 7-cylinder two-stroke TAD 36 Clark Sulzer diesels, 3,640 hp (2,694 kW) with controllable pitch propellers
- Speed: 14 knots (26 km/h; 16 mph)
- Complement: 126
- Armament: 2 × 20 mm Oerlikons (fitted 1980)
- Aircraft carried: 1 Wasp helicopter (from 1982)

HMNZS Monowai (A06) was a hydrographic survey vessel of the Royal New Zealand Navy (RNZN). Built in 1960, the ship was originally used as a civilian supply and passenger vessel by the New Zealand Government, under the name GMV Moana Roa, before being acquired by the RNZN in 1974. She was commissioned into the RNZN in 1975 for the voyage to Scotland for conversion and commissioned into the RNZN in October 1977. She remained in RNZN service until April 1998, performing various duties such as coastal surveying, resupply, and surveillance. After being decommissioned she was sold to civilian operators in Britain in 1998 for conversion to a cruise ship, but was found unsuitable for the role and eventually sent to Spanish shipbreakers in 2002.

== Construction and design ==
The ship was laid down by Grangemouth Dockyard in Scotland in 1960. The ship displaced 3,900 tons at full load, was 90.8 metres (298 ft) in length overall and 82.3 metres (270 ft) long at the keel, had a beam of 14.1 metres (46 ft) and a draught of 5.2 metres (17 ft). Propulsion machinery consisted of two 7-cylinder two-stroke TAD 36 Clark Sulzer diesels, which provided 3,640 horsepower (2,710 kW) to the controllable pitch propellers The ship had a top speed of 14 knots (26 km/h; 16 mph). In RNZN service, the ship had a crew of 126 and after 1980 was armed with two 20 mm Oerlikons for self-defence. In 1982, she was fitted out to carry a single Wasp helicopter.

== Operational history ==
After being completed, the vessel spent the first part of her operational life as the New Zealand Government Island supply/passenger vessel GMV Moana Roa. She was acquired by the Royal New Zealand Navy in 1974 and converted over a two-year period in Scotland 1975-77 to replace her predecessor, HMNZS Lachlan. Monowai was the second of two ships with this name to serve in the RNZN. She was named after the glacial Lake Monowai. Monowai is a Māori word meaning "channel full of water".

During her naval service she was known as the "Ghost of the Coast", as she quietly remapped most of the New Zealand coastline including the Chatham, Campbell, and Auckland Islands, as well as the many sub-Antarctic islands in New Zealand's responsibility. She also acted as a resupply vessel carrying stores and equipment to Campbell and other sub-Antarctic islands and served as an "official residence" for VIPs and dignitaries at Pacific Island conferences.

Other tasks included monitoring Chinese missile splashdown tests, responding to the 1987 Fijian coups d'état to assist in the evacuation of New Zealand citizens, participating in the ANZCAN cable route survey, and assisting in international searches for sea mounts and shoals. She carried a helicopter and undertook rescue or aid missions, saving the lives of eight people during the New Zealand to Tonga Yacht Regatta.

== Decommissioning and fate ==
Monowai was replaced in 1998 by HMNZS Resolution, formerly USNS Tenacious. She was sold to British buyers, Hebridean Island Cruises, for conversion into a cruise ship in 1998. She was laid up at Lowestoft in England after being found unsuitable for her intended use until 2002 when she was finally sent to Spanish shipbreakers.

== See also ==
- Survey ships of the Royal New Zealand Navy
