= HMNZS Monowai (F59) =

1925 ocean liner converted to armed merchantman

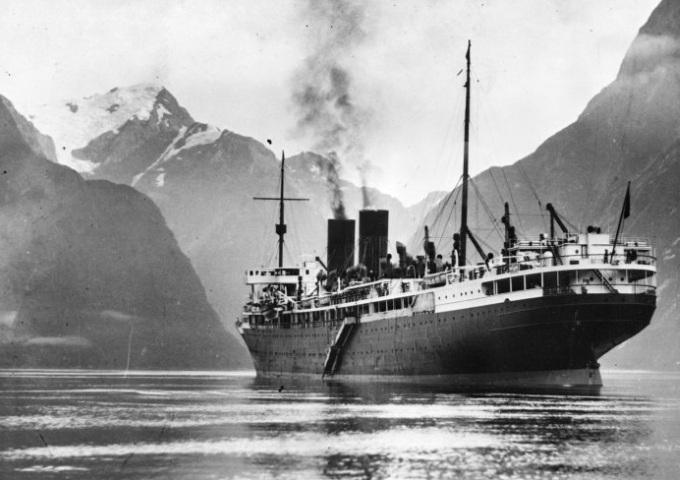
- Monowai in Milford Sound in 1933.

History

New Zealand
- Name: SS Razmak
- Namesake: Razmak in the Northwest Frontier
- Builder: Harland & Wolff
- Yard number: 659
- Laid down: 1923
- Launched: 16 October 1924
- Completed: 26 February 1925
- In service: 1925
- Out of service: 1930

New Zealand
- Name: SS Monowai
- Namesake: Lake Monowai. (Note: Monowai is a glacial lake in New Zealand. Monowai is a Māori word meaning "channel full of water".)
- In service: 1930
- Out of service: 1939

New Zealand
- Name: HMNZS Monowai
- Acquired: 21 October 1939
- Commissioned: 30 August 1940
- Decommissioned: 18 June 1943
- Identification: F59

United Kingdom
- Name: HMS Monowai
- Acquired: 1943
- Commissioned: 18 June 1943
- Decommissioned: August 1946

New Zealand
- Name: SS Monowai
- Acquired: Returned to owners 1946
- Fate: Sold for breaking up 1960

General characteristics
- Class & type: armed merchant cruiser; from 1944: landing ship/troopship
- Tonnage: 10,852 GRT, 4,925 NRT
- Length: 158.2/152.5 m (519/500 ft)
- Beam: 19.3 m (63 ft)
- Propulsion: two-shaft reciprocal 4-cylinder QE; plus low reduction twin exhaust turbines; 14,740 bhp (10,990 kW)
- Speed: 18 knots (33 km/h; 21 mph) max
- Complement: 366 as AMC
- Sensors & processing systems: SS1 Type Radar
- Armament: As AMC; 8 × 6 in (152 mm) guns (4 each side); 2 × 3 in (76 mm) AA; 6 × 20 mm; Twin 20 mm with radar added June 1942; Some machine guns, 8 depth charges; As LSI(L); 1 × 4 in (100 mm) gun; 2 × QF 12-pounder; 2 × QF 2-pounder AA; 2 × 40 mm; 2 × quad RPs; 8 × 20 mm AA
- Notes: Davits fitted for 20 LCAs (Landing Craft Assault) for 800 plus troops. Capacity of each 35 troops or 365 kg (805 lb) cargo.

HMNZS Monowai (F59) was a former P&O merchant vessel. At the outbreak of World War II she became an armed merchant cruiser of the Royal New Zealand Navy (RNZN). She subsequently became HMS Monowai, a Landing Ship, Infantry and mostly operated as a troopship. In 1946 she returned to her old trade as a passenger ship.

== Civilian career ==
SS Razmak was built at Greenock yard for P&O by Harland & Wolff, launched in 1924 and completed on 26 February 1925. She was designed for service between Bombay and Aden and spent several years in the Mediterranean Sea. When demand on her original route dried up, she was offered for sale and transferred to the antipodes. The Union Steam Ship Company, part of the P&O group, took her on in 1930 as the Monowai and she ran a subsidised service from Wellington to Vancouver via several Pacific Ocean stops. From 24 November 1932 she ran mostly from Wellington to Sydney.

== Conversion to armed merchant cruiser ==
Guns suitable for Monowai had been ordered and stored at the Devonport Naval Base in Auckland. Monowai was requisitioned by the Royal New Zealand Navy on 21 October 1939 and was prepared for mounting the guns. Then followed a period of indecision, and in February 1940 work on her was suspended for over four months. After construction was completed in August 1940, she was commissioned.

The Japanese submarine I-20 conducted an unsuccessful attack on her on 16 January 1942.

Monowai was the first of two ships with this name to serve in the Royal New Zealand Navy. She was named after the New Zealand glacial lake Monowai. Monowai is a Māori word meaning "channel full of water".

== Conversion to LSI ==
As surplus, in 1943 she was transferred to Liverpool in England and handed over to the British Ministry of War Transport. Monowai went to Glasgow for conversion to an "Landing Ship, Infantry (Large)" or LSI(L). From June 1943 to February 1944 she was refitted with completely different armament, capacity for up to 1,800 fully equipped troops, and 20 Assault Landing Craft. She was used during the Normandy landings.

In the later period of the war she was used as a troopship transporting soldiers and after the end of the war in repatriation, one of whose passengers is Holocaust survivor Otto Frank.

== Post war ==
On 31 August 1946 she was returned to her owner. She resumed merchant service in January 1949 after extensive repair. In 1960 she was sold for breaking up in Hong Kong.
