= Moa-class patrol boat =

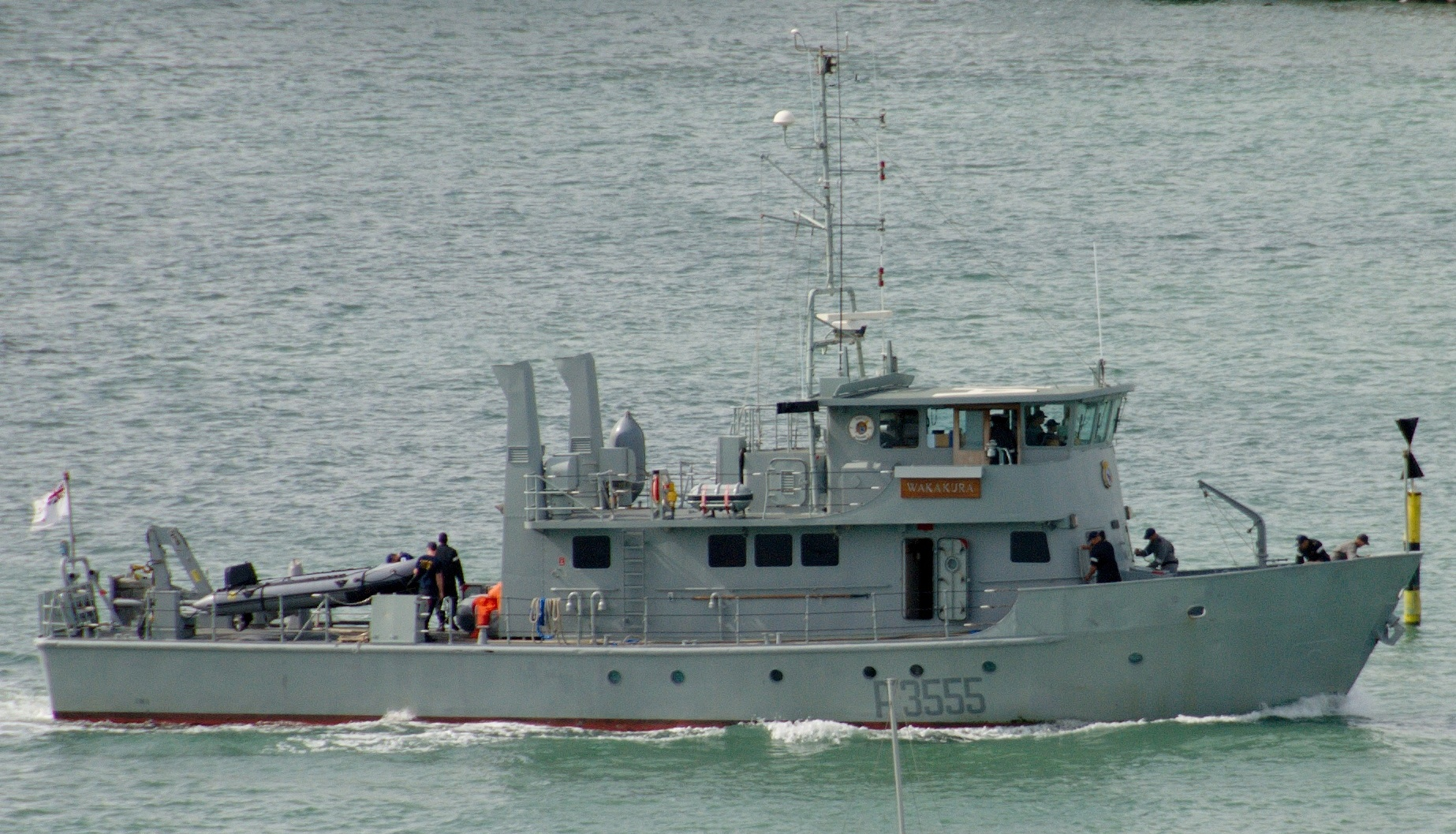
- HMNZS Wakakura in Devonport

Class overview
- Name: Moa
- Operators: Royal New Zealand Navy
- Succeeded by: Protector-class IPV
- In commission: 1983-2009
- Completed: 7
- Active: 0
- Retired: 7

General characteristics
- Type: Patrol boat
- Displacement: 91.5 tons standard; 105 tons full load
- Length: 27 metres (89 ft)
- Beam: 6.1 metres (20 ft)
- Draught: 2.4 metres (7 ft 10 in)
- Propulsion: Two Cummins diesels (710 hp) Twin shafts
- Speed: 12 knots (22 km/h; 14 mph)
- Range: 3,000 nautical miles (5,600 km; 3,500 mi)
- Complement: 18: 5 Officers: 3 Senior Rates: 10 Ratings
- Sensors & processing systems: Navigation Radar Racal Decca 916 I Band
- Armament: 1 x 12.7mm MG
- Aviation facilities: None
- Notes: Four ships previously fitted with side scan sonar

The Moa-class patrol boat was a class of patrol boats built between 1978 and 1985 for the Royal New Zealand Navy by the Whangarei Engineering and Construction Company. They were based on an Australian boat design.

== Vessels of the class ==
Altogether there were seven vessels in the class

Name	Commissioned	Decommissioned
HMNZS Kahu (A04)	17 May 1988	30 October 2009
HMNZS Tarapunga		8 June 2000
HMNZS Takapu		8 June 2000
HMNZS Moa (P3553)	28 November 1983	23 January 2007
HMNZS Kiwi (P3554)	2 September 1984	11 December 2007
HMNZS Wakakura (P3555)	26 March 1985	11 December 2007
HMNZS Hinau (P3556)	4 October 1985	23 January 2007

The lead vessel, Kahu, was initially named HMNZS Manawanui from 28 May 1979 to 17 May 1988. She was modified so she would function as a diving tender. After the commissioning of the dedicated Diving Support Tender HMNZS Manawanui (A09) she remained in service (as the Kahu) attached to the Royal New Zealand Naval College, now the New Zealand Defence College, as the basic seamanship and navigation training vessel.

The next two vessels, Tarapunga and Takapu, were modified with their superstructure accommodation increased so they could function as inshore survey vessels. These were both decommissioned in the year 2000.

The last four vessels functioned as inshore patrol vessels for the Naval Volunteer Reserve. From 1994 these were modified to conduct mine countermeasures route surveying using side-scan sonar. This was used on several occasions for search-and-rescue or transport investigations. In 2005, three vessels were relocated to Auckland to fill the training gap left by the decommissioning of HMNZS Canterbury. Kiwi relocated to Auckland during 2006. On relocating, the vessels' side scan sonars were removed.

With the introduction of the Project Protector ships, Moa, Kiwi, Wakakura and Hinau were replaced by four Protector-class inshore patrol vessels during 2007 and 2008. Kahu remained in service for seamanship and Officer of the Watch training until 2009.

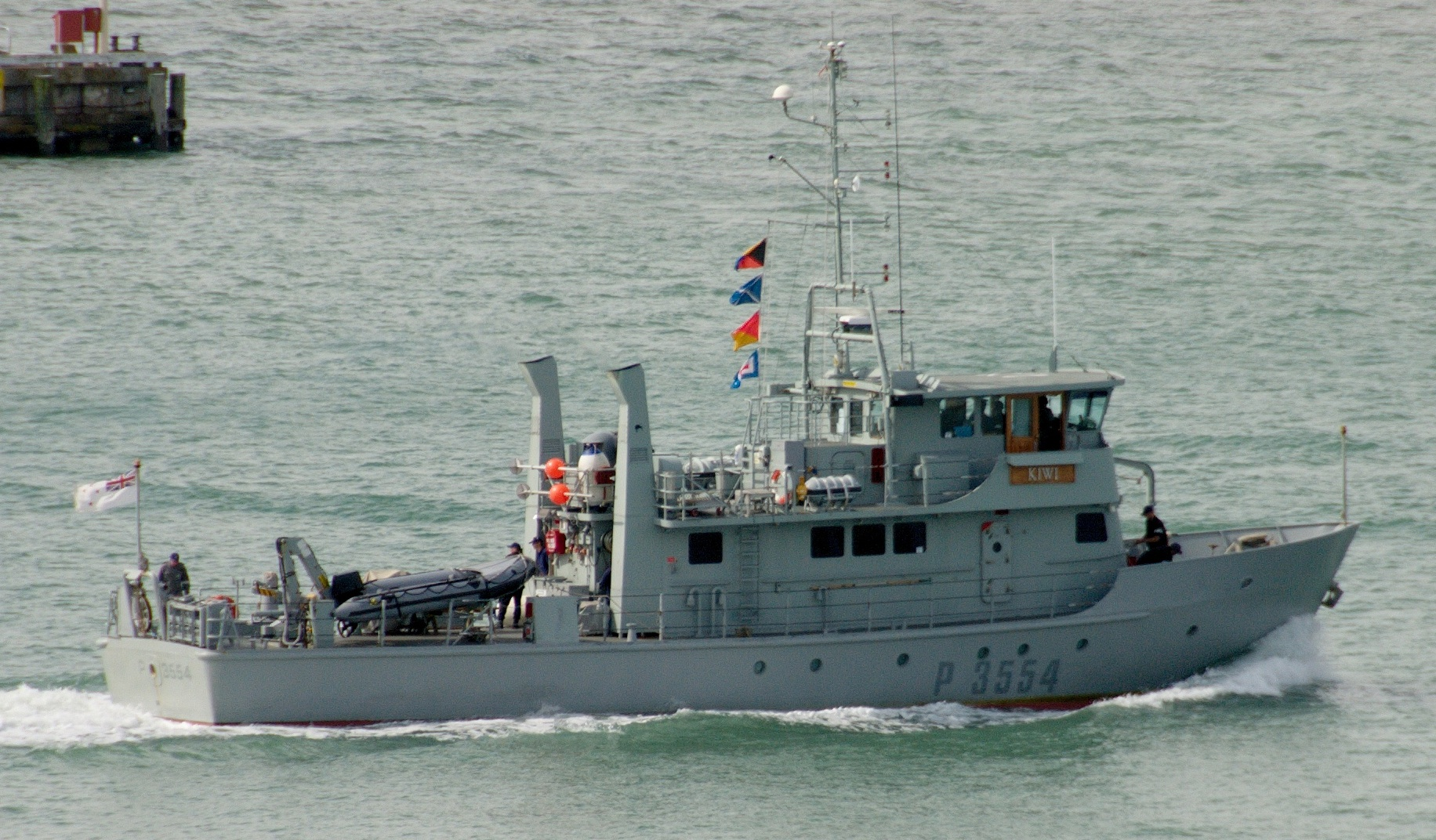
HMNZS Kiwi in Devonport
