= HMNZS Wakakura (T00) =

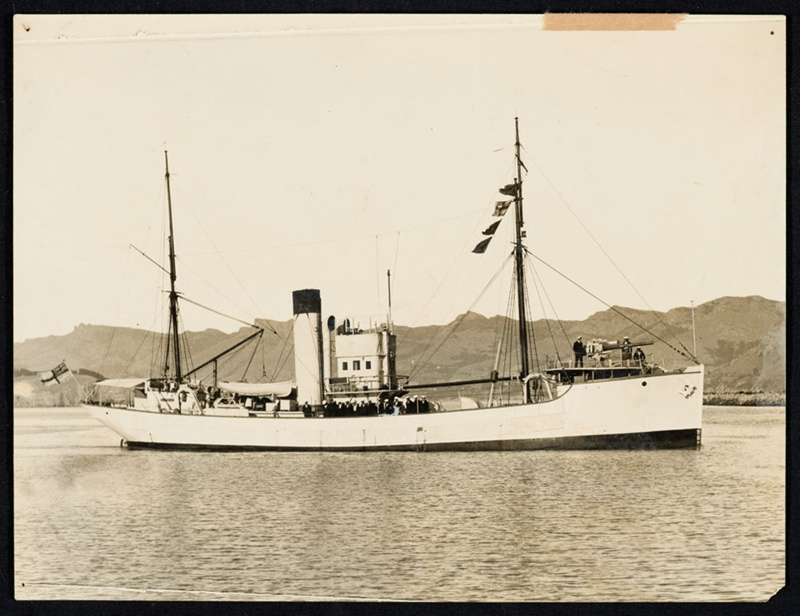
- Wakakura at Lyttelton

History

Canada
- Name: HMCS TR 1
- Builder: Port Arthur Shipbuilding, Port Arthur
- Laid down: 31 May 1917
- Launched: September 1917
- Completed: 17 October 1917

New Zealand
- Name: HMNZS Wakakura
- Acquired: 1926
- Commissioned: 1926
- Decommissioned: 1947
- Identification: Pennant number T00
- Fate: Scrapped 1953

General characteristics
- Class & type: Castle-class naval trawler
- Displacement: 540 standard, 620 tons fully loaded
- Length: 135 ft (41 m) /125 ft (38 m) feet
- Beam: 23.5 ft (7.2 m)
- Draught: 15 ft (4.6 m)
- Propulsion: One shaft reciprocating, 420 ihp (310 kW)
- Speed: 10 knots (19 km/h; 12 mph)
- Complement: 26 (training)
- Armament: 1 × 4 in (102 mm) gun; 2 × 1 machine guns; twin Lewis guns; 4 depth charges

HMNZS Wakakura (T00) was originally a First World War Castle-class naval trawler built in Canada. Ordered by the Admiralty, the vessel, named TR 1, was loaned to the Royal Canadian Navy for use on the East Coast of Canada. She was purchased by New Zealand in 1926 and transferred to the Royal New Zealand Navy when it was established in 1941.

She displaced 530 tons standard, could manage 10 knots (19 km/h; 12 mph) and was equipped with a 4-inch (102 mm) gun during World War II.

Wakakura is a Māori word which means "precious canoe" or "training boat"

== World War II ==
Wakakura remained in commission throughout the Second World War as a training vessel and minesweeper. For the first part of the war she was part of the 28th Minesweeper Flotilla, until the flotilla was transferred overseas. From then the Wakakura was based at Lyttelton.

"A little trawler paid a big part in the lives of New Zealand's pre-war and wartime naval reservists. Her Majesty's Trawler (later HMNZS) Wakakura, purchased from the Royal Navy scrap heap 'as is, where is' to be a training ship, also left an impression on various wharves and a couple of other ships as she roamed from port to port around New Zealand instructing young would-be sailors in naval procedures."

During 1944 the Wakakura reported that it had sighted and depth charged a Japanese submarine off the Canterbury Coast, possibly sinking it. Naval historians concluded that while it was possible for Japanese submarines to be in the area, it was unlikely at that stage of the war.

The ship's bell was installed in the Devonport Naval Base Chapel.

== Cargo vessel ==
After the war in 1947 she was sold to the Tasman Steamship Company owned by a syndicate of 17 former merchant seamen. The ship was renamed SS Wakakura and converted to a refrigerated cargo vessel for use on the trans-Tasman run from Auckland and Wellington to Sydney. The ships maiden voyage as a merchant ship was in October 1947 under Captain F A Barrett from Auckland to Sydney. The newspaper stated that the voyage across the Tasman Sea was expected to take 6 days.

By 1948 the company decided that the ship was to small for the Trans-Tasman run and decided to purchase a larger vessel. The ship had made seven return voyages by the time. The Fiji Government owned motor ship Viti was acquired by the company as a replacement. When the Viti entered service the Wakakura was used for coastal shipping.

The company put the ship up for sale in November 1950, and was sold to Mason Bros. Engineering Co. Ltd, being broken up at the Viaduct Basin in Auckland.

== See also ==
- Minesweepers of the Royal New Zealand Navy
