= Survey motor boat =

Small vessel used for hydrographic survey

A survey motor boat (abbreviated SMB), is a vessel equipped for commercial and/or military hydrographic survey operations.
