= HMNZS Moa (T233) =

1941 Bird-class minesweeper

Coordinates: 9°05′42.1″S 160°8′57.20″E

History

New Zealand
- Name: HMNZS Moa (T233)
- Namesake: Moa
- Ordered: September 1939
- Builder: Henry Robb Ltd., Leith
- Laid down: 22 March 1940
- Launched: 15 May 1941
- Sponsored by: Lady Ferguson, wife of former governor-general Sir Charles Fergusson
- Commissioned: 12 August 1941
- Fate: Sunk by Japanese aircraft, 7 April 1943

General characteristics
- Class & type: Bird-class minesweeper
- Displacement: 607 tons standard; 923 tons full load
- Length: 168 ft (51 m) (overall); 157.5 ft (48.0 m) (keel)
- Beam: 30 ft (9.1 m)
- Draught: 15.3 ft (4.7 m)
- Propulsion: 1,100 ihp (820 kW) oil
- Speed: 13 knots (24 km/h)
- Complement: 33–35
- Sensors & processing systems: ASDIC
- Armament: 1 × 4-inch gun; 1 × QF 2-pounder naval gun; 1 × twin Lewis; 40-42 depth charges

HMNZS Moa (T233) was a Bird-class minesweeper of the Royal New Zealand Navy (RNZN) that served during World War II.

== Construction and design ==
The first of three Bird-class minesweepers, Moa displaced 607 tons standard and 923 tons at full load. She was 168 ft (51 m) long overall, had a beam of 30 ft (9.1 m) and a draught of 15.3 ft (4.7 m). She had a top speed of 13 knots (24 km/h) and a crew of between 33 and 35 personnel. Moa's main armament was a single 4-inch Mk IX naval gun, which was supplemented by anti-aircraft guns. She also carried minesweeping equipment and 40 depth charges for anti-submarine operations.

== Operational history ==
Commissioned into the Royal New Zealand Navy on 12 August 1941, Moa was the first of two vessels with this name to serve in the RNZN and was named after a native bird from New Zealand.

External videos
- HMNZS Kiwi and Moa versus submarine I-1: David versus Goliath at Sea - Drachinifel

On 29 January 1943, in concert with her sister ship Kiwi, Moa helped to ram and wreck the Japanese submarine I-1. At the time Moa was under the command of Lieutenant Commander Peter Phipps, later to become a vice admiral.

In February 1943, Moa participated in Operation Cleanslate, the occupation of the Russell Islands. However, when the Moa put the forces ashore, local natives informed them that the Japanese had left ten days before.

On 7 April 1943 Moa was refuelling from the USS Erskine M. Phelps at Tulagi Harbor when Japanese aircraft attacked. Moa sustained two near misses and two direct hits from 500-pound (230 kg) bombs, one that passed through the ship before exploding in the water abeam to starboard, the other passed through the captain's cabin into the boiler room, where it exploded, effectively "breaking the ship′s back." Moa sank bow-first within about four minutes. Five ratings were killed and seven were seriously wounded, including Phipps. At some point in the interim following the sinking of the submarine I-1 and her own sinking, the Moa crew had acquired and mounted a 20 mm Oerlikon anti-aircraft gun on her very bow, with which the crew used against their attackers before they sank. This 20mm gun could still be seen on her wreck in 2002.

== Postscript ==
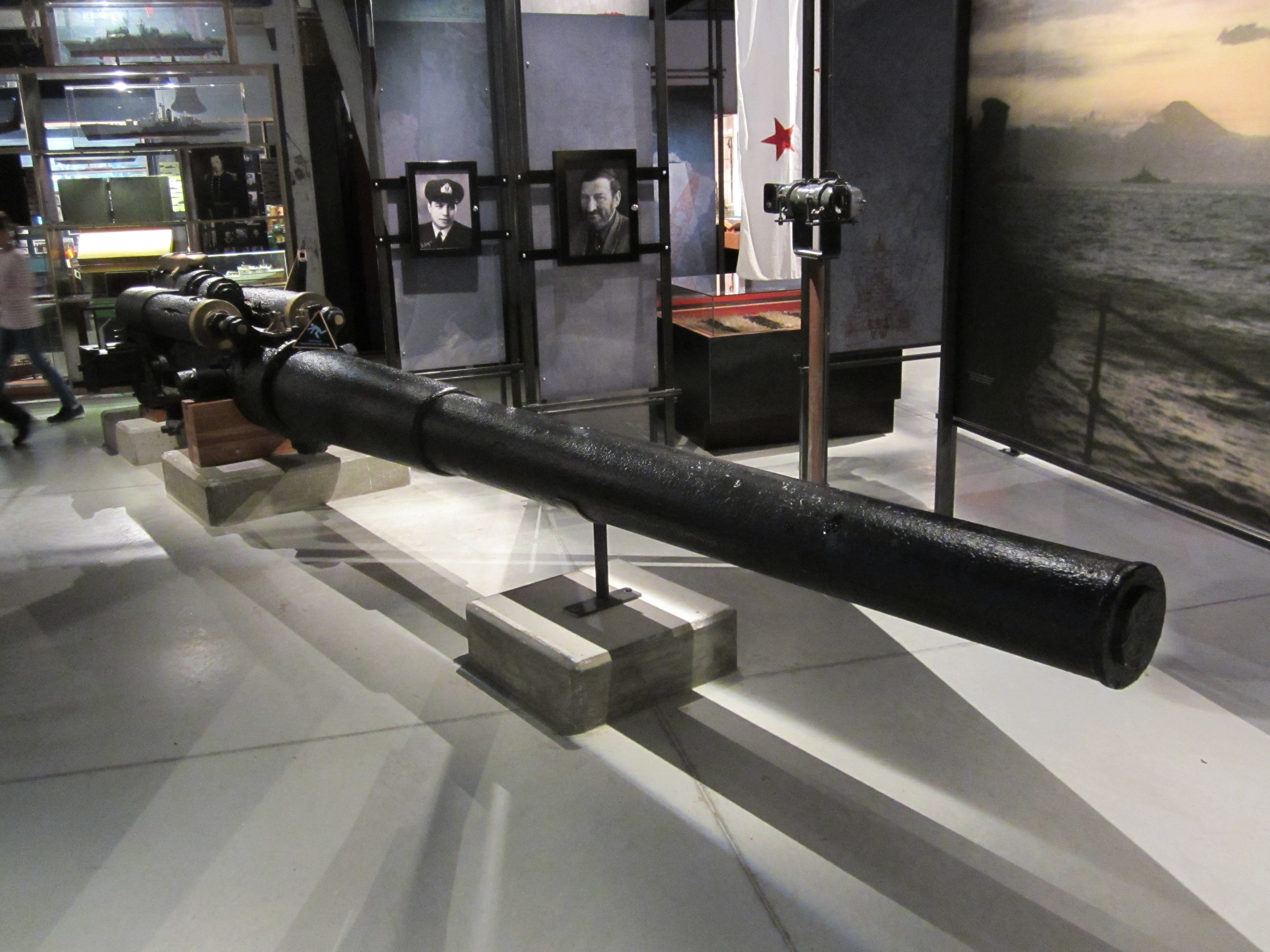
I-1's gun on display at the Torpedo Bay Navy Museum

Seventy-one years after her sinking, Moa's name plate was recovered by divers and is being restored for eventual display at the Torpedo Bay Navy Museum in Auckland, New Zealand. The Torpedo Bay Naval Museum already has on display the main deck gun recovered from the wreck of the I-1.

== See also ==
- Minesweepers of the Royal New Zealand Navy
