= HMNZS Kiwi (T102) =

Bird class minesweeper of the Royal New Zealand Navy

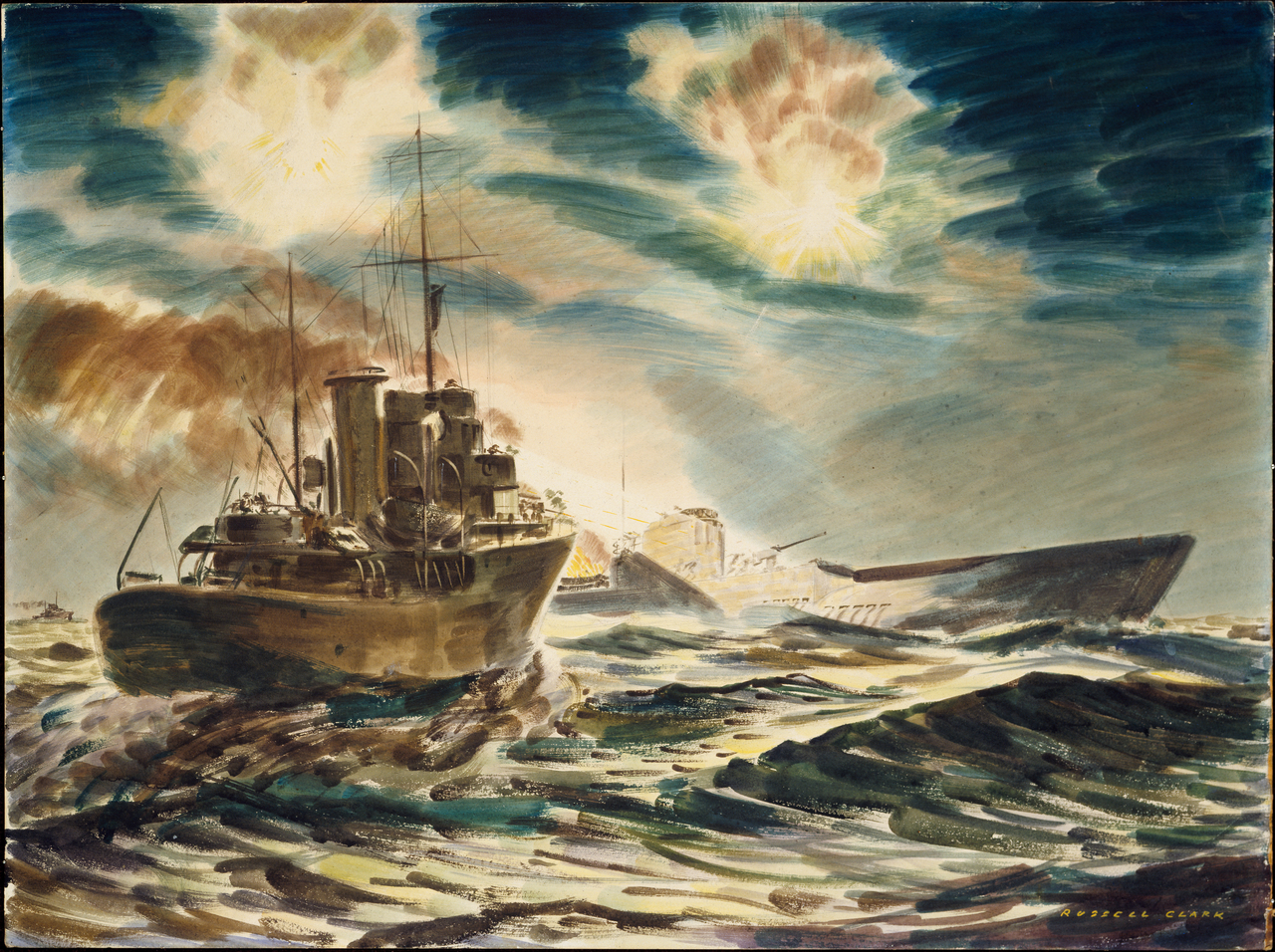
- Night action off Guadalcanal; HMNZS Kiwi and Japanese submarine I-1

History

New Zealand
- Name: HMNZS Kiwi (T102)
- Builder: Henry Robb Ltd. Scotland.
- Commissioned: 20 October 1941
- Decommissioned: 20 December 1956

General characteristics
- Class & type: Bird class minesweeper
- Displacement: 607 tons standard; 923 tons full load
- Length: 168 ft (51 m)
- Beam: 30 ft (9.1 m)
- Draught: 15.3 ft (4.7 m)
- Propulsion: 1,100 ihp (820 kW) oil
- Speed: 13 knots (24 km/h)
- Complement: 33-35
- Armament: 1 × 4 inch gun; 2 × 1 Hotchkiss guns; Twin Lewis guns; 40 depth charges

HMNZS Kiwi (T102) was a Bird class minesweeper of the Royal New Zealand Navy.

She was commissioned in 1941 for minesweeping and anti-submarine roles. From 1948 to 1956 she functioned as a training ship.

On 29 January 1943, with her sister ship Moa, Kiwi rammed and wrecked the large Japanese submarine I-1. At the time Kiwi was under the command of Lieutenant Commander Gordon Bridson who was awarded the DSC and the United States Navy Cross for this action. Leading Signalman Campbell Howard Buchanan (7 April 1920, Port Chalmers – 31 January 1943, Tulagi) manned the Kiwi's searchlight during the action and remained at his post despite having been mortally wounded. He was posthumously mentioned in despatches and awarded the United States Navy Cross.

Kiwi was the first vessel with this name to serve in the Royal New Zealand Navy and is named after the national bird of New Zealand.

== Fate ==
Laid up in 1956, Kiwi was scrapped in Auckland in 1964.

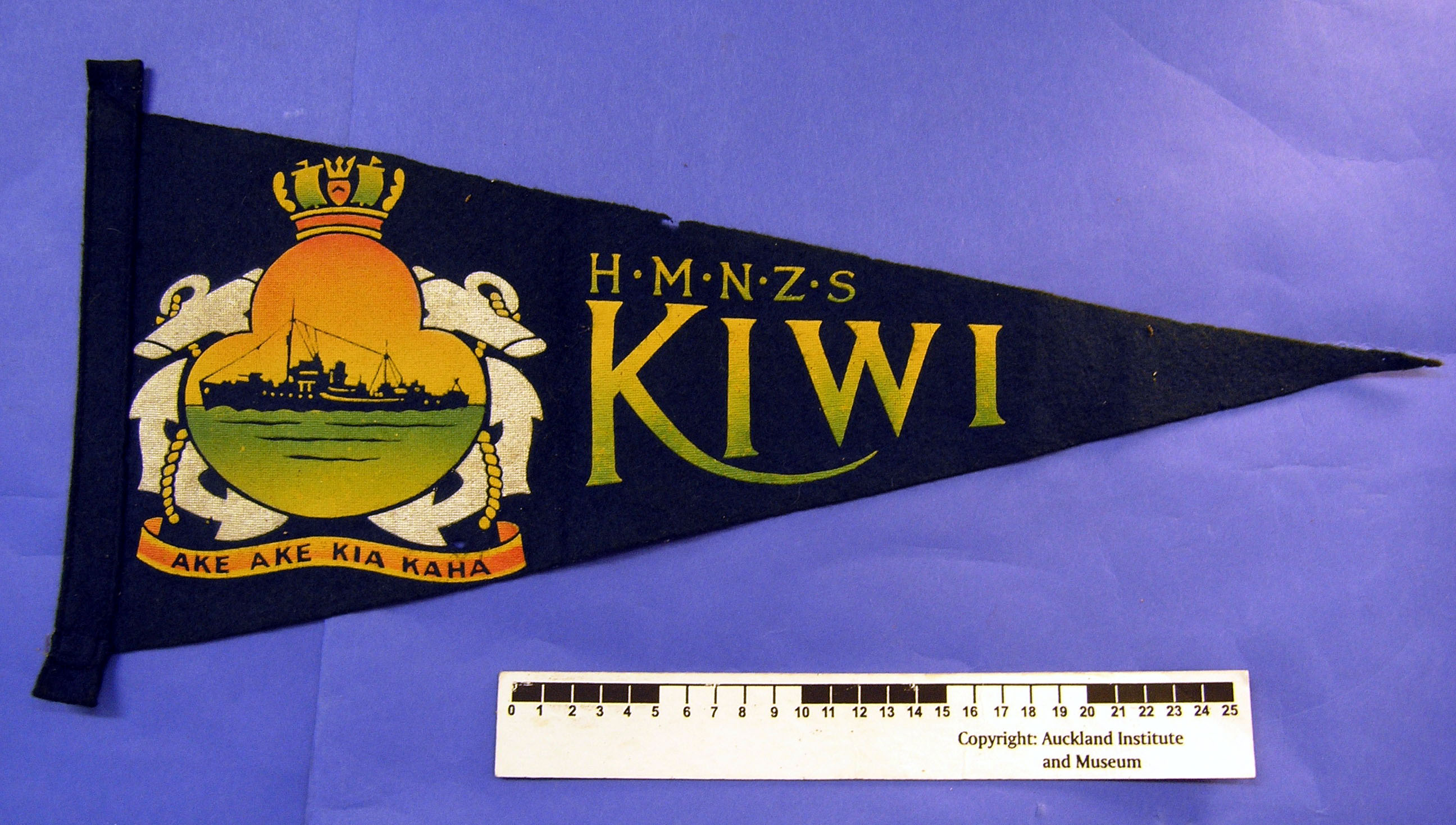
HMNZS Kiwi pennant

External videos
- HMNZS Kiwi and Moa versus submarine I-1: David versus Goliath at Sea - Drachinifel

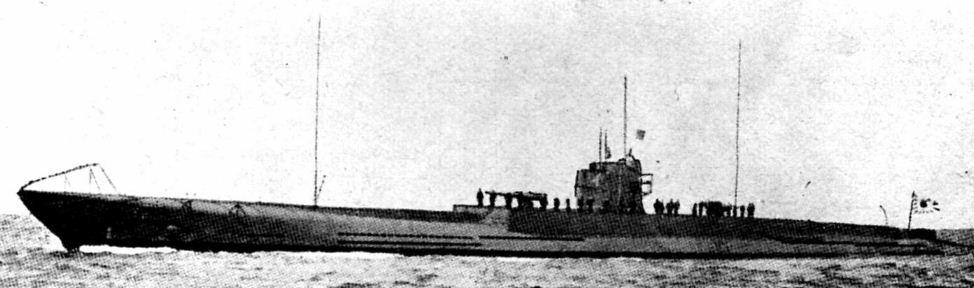
Japanese submarine I-1

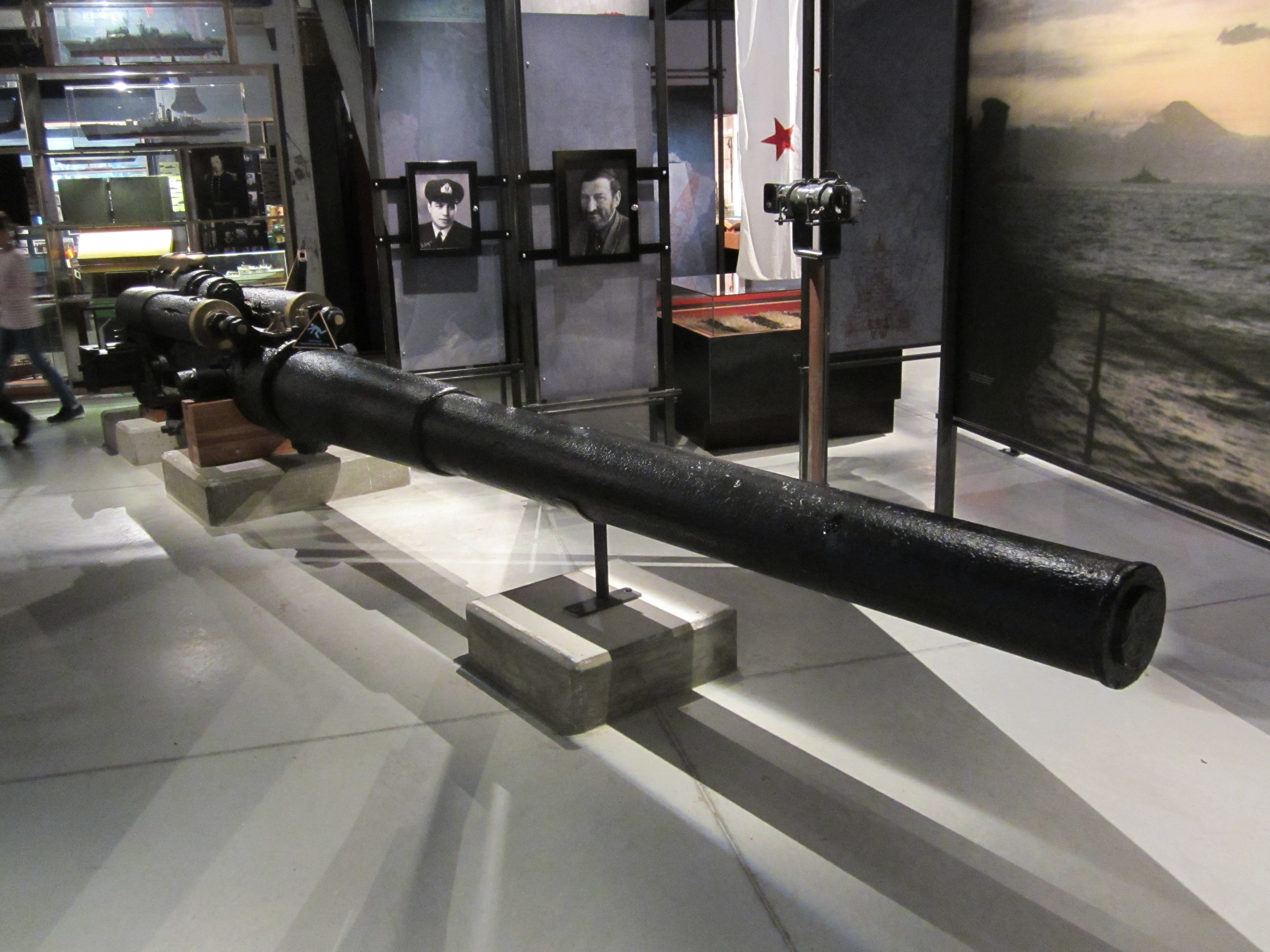
I-1's 140mm gun on display at the Torpedo Bay Navy Museum

== See also ==
- Minesweepers of the Royal New Zealand Navy
