= Nicholas Tarling =

New Zealand historian

Nicholas Tarling MNZM
- Born: Peter Nicholas Tarling; 1 February 1931; Iver, Buckinghamshire, England
- Died: 13 May 2017 (aged 86); Auckland, New Zealand
- Children: 1

Academic background
- Education: University of Cambridge
- Thesis: British Policy towards the Dutch and Native Princes in the Malay Archipelago, 1824–1871 (1956)
- Doctoral advisor: Victor Purcell

Academic work
- Institutions: Royal Historical Society; University of Queensland; University of Auckland
- Doctoral students: Brook Barrington
- Notable works: The Cambridge History of Southeast Asia (1992)

Peter Nicholas Tarling MNZM (1 February 1931 – 13 May 2017) was a historian, academic, and author. He specialised in Southeast Asian history, and wrote on 18th- and 19th-century Malaysia, North Borneo, the Philippines, and Laos, especially regarding foreign involvement in those countries.

== Biography ==
=== Early life ===
Nicholas Tarling was born on 1 February 1931 in Iver, Buckinghamshire, England, and obtained his secondary education at St Albans School. As an undergraduate at Christ's College, Cambridge, he was supervised by, among others, Sir John H. Plumb. He also earned his PhD at Cambridge, supervised by Dr Victor Purcell.

=== Career ===
In 1957 he took up a teaching post at the University of Queensland in Gordon Greenwood's Department of History and Political Science. There, he taught courses in both European and Asian history. During those years he visited Southeast Asia and the US, and published three books: a revised version of his thesis; Anglo-Dutch Relations in the Malay World; Piracy and Politics in the Malay World.

In 1965 Tarling was appointed associate professor at the University of Auckland in New Zealand, and in 1968 he became a full professor, still as a European and Asian history teacher. He also held posts as Dean of the Faculty of Arts, Chairman of the Deans Committee, and Deputy Vice-Chancellor. He also served on a number of inter-university and government committees.

He was the founder and president of the New Zealand Asian Studies Society (NZASIA) and also had two terms as President of the Association of University Teachers of New Zealand. His interest in the arts led to his appointment to Queen Elizabeth II Arts Council, to the chairmanship of the Symphonia of Auckland, and to a directorship of Opera New Zealand. He was a busy amateur actor and served for many years as University Orator.

He retired in 1996. He was a Fellow of the New Zealand Asia Institute and served for a while as director of the institute and later of the International Office. He was also a visiting professor at University of Brunei Darussalam and honorary professor at University of Hull.

He was awarded the Cambridge Litt.D. in 1974 and given an honorary Litt.D. by the University of Auckland in 1996. In the 1996 Queen's Birthday Honours, Tarling was appointed a Member of the New Zealand Order of Merit, for services to historical research and the arts.

=== Death ===
Tarling died on 13 May 2017 while swimming at Narrow Neck beach on Auckland's North Shore.

== Publications ==
Tarling published some 45 books and edited fifteen. Those in Asian history include Britain, the Brookes and Brunei (1971), Sulu and Sabah (1978), The Burthen, The Risk and the Glory (1982), and The Fourth Anglo-Burman War (1987).

He also edited The Cambridge History of Southeast Asia. In retirement he has completed a trilogy on British policy in Southeast Asia during the Pacific War, the Cold War and the Korean War, and also published a book on the Japanese interregnum, A Sudden Rampage. A second trilogy, on imperialism, nationalism and regionalism in Southeast Asia, is almost complete. He also published books on university policy, including one on overseas students, and on opera.

=== Selected publications ===
- Tarling, Nicholas. Anglo-Dutch rivalry in the Malay world, 1780–1824. Cambridge: Cambridge University Press, 1962.
- Tarling, Nicholas. Sulu and Sabah : a study of British policy towards the Philippines and North Borneo from the late eighteenth century. Kuala Lumpur; New York : Oxford University Press, 1978. ISBN 019580337X
- Butterworth, Ruth; Tarling, Nicholas (1994). A Shakeup Anyway: Government and the Universities in New Zealand in a Decade of Reform. Auckland University Press. ISBN 1869401034.
- Tarling, Nicholas. Historians and Southeast Asian history. Auckland, N.Z.: New Zealand Asia Institute, University of Auckland, c2000. ISBN 0-908689-66-7 (pbk.)
- Tarling, Nicholas. History Boy : a memoir. Wellington, N.Z.: Dunmore Publishing, 2009. ISBN 978-1-877399-45-9
- Tarling, Nicholas. The State, Development and Identity in Multi-ethnic Societies: Ethnicity, Equity and the Nation. London: Routledge, 2010. ISBN 978-0-415-58691-7
- Tarling, Nicholas. Orientalism and The Operatic World. 2015.
