= 1986 New Zealand Royal Visit Honours =

Appointments to the Royal Victorian Order

1986 Royal Visit Honours
- Previous: 1986 Special Honours; Next: 1986 Queen's Birthday Honours
- Type: New Zealand royal honours: Royal Victorian Order
- Date: 28 February – 2 March 1986
- Country: New Zealand
- Total recipients: 10

The 1986 New Zealand Royal Visit Honours were appointments by Elizabeth II to the Royal Victorian Order, to mark her visit to New Zealand that year. The honours were announced between 28 February and 2 March 1986.

The recipients of honours are listed here as they were styled before their new honour.

== Royal Victorian Order ==
=== Knight Grand Cross (GCVO) ===
- The Most Reverend Sir Paul Alfred Reeves GCMG – governor-general of New Zealand
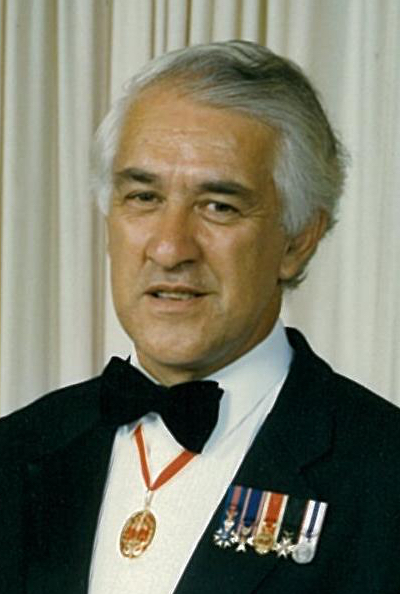
Sir Paul Reeves

=== Commander (CVO) ===
- Edward James Babe

=== Lieutenant (LVO) ===
- Genevieve Margaret Jordan MVO

=== Member (MVO) ===
- Helen Lorraine Aitken
- Ian Gordon Edward Coddington – chief traffic superintendent, Ministry of Transport
- Judith Anne McConway
- Lieutenant Anthony Jonathan Parr – Royal New Zealand Navy
- Ronald Edward Terry
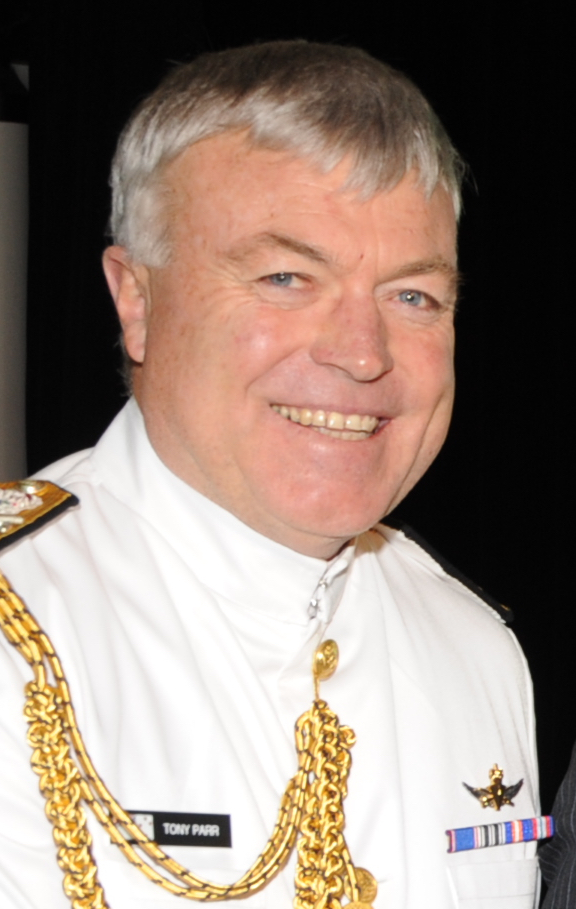
Tony Parr

== Royal Victorian Medal ==
=== Bar to the Royal Victorian Medal (Silver) (RVM) ===
- Sergeant Peter Forbes Orr RVM QSM – New Zealand Police

=== Silver (RVM) ===
- Frederick James Page

=== Bronze (RVM) ===
- Evelyn Doris Hodson
