= David Ledson =

Admiral Royal New Zealand Navy

David Ledson ONZM CRSNZ
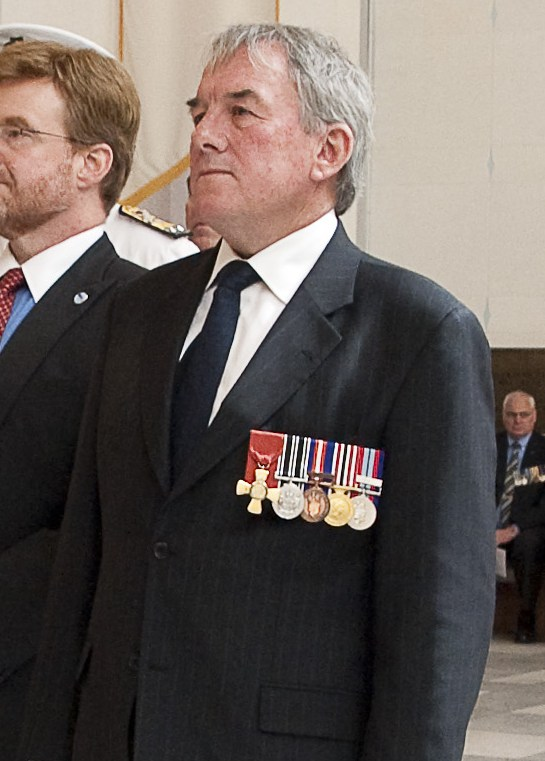
- Ledson in 2010
- Born: 13 January 1951 (age 75); Reefton, New Zealand
- Military career
- Allegiance: New Zealand
- Branch: Royal New Zealand Navy
- Service years: 1967–2009
- Rank: Rear Admiral
- Commands: Chief of Navy (2004–09); HMNZS Waikato (1989–90)
- Awards: Officer of the New Zealand Order of Merit

Rear Admiral David Ian Ledson, ONZM CRSNZ (born 13 January 1951) is a retired senior officer of the Royal New Zealand Navy and former Chief of Navy (2004–09). He is the Chairman of the Board of Maritime New Zealand, and was named a Companion of the Royal Society of New Zealand in 2009.

== Early life and education ==
Ledson was educated at Inangahua College and Christchurch Boys' High School, and joined the Royal New Zealand Navy as a cadet midshipman in January 1967. He underwent training at the Royal Australian Naval College, Jervis Bay. From 1969 to 1971 he studied at the University of Auckland and obtained a Bachelor of Arts degree in history.

== Naval career ==
He served in HMNZS Waikato between July 1973 and October 1975, followed by almost two years in HMNZS Otago. He then attended warfare courses in the United Kingdom, specialising in navigation. After the course he returned to HMNZS Waikato as the Weapons Control Officer.

In March 1980 he became the Personal Staff Officer to the Chief of Naval Staff before returning to HMNZS Waikato as the Operations Officer in April 1982. Between January and June 1984 he attended the Royal Australian Naval Staff College in Sydney. In October 1985 he joined the staff of the Chief of Naval Staff as the Director of Naval Operational Data Systems until October 1989 when he became Commanding Officer of HMNZS Waikato. In November 1990 he was attached to Blohm & Voss, in Hamburg for eighteen months for duties with the ANZAC Ship project.

In July 1992 he was appointed as Chief of Naval Development on the staff of the Chief of Naval Staff. Between July 1994 and June 1995 he was posted to the United States' Naval War College. After the War College he was appointed Director of Resource Policy for the Chief of Defence Force.

In February 1998 he was posted as Captain Fleet Support and was promoted Deputy Chief of Naval Staff, with the rank of commodore, in April 2000. He became Chief of Navy and was promoted rear admiral on 8 April 2004.

== Honours and awards ==
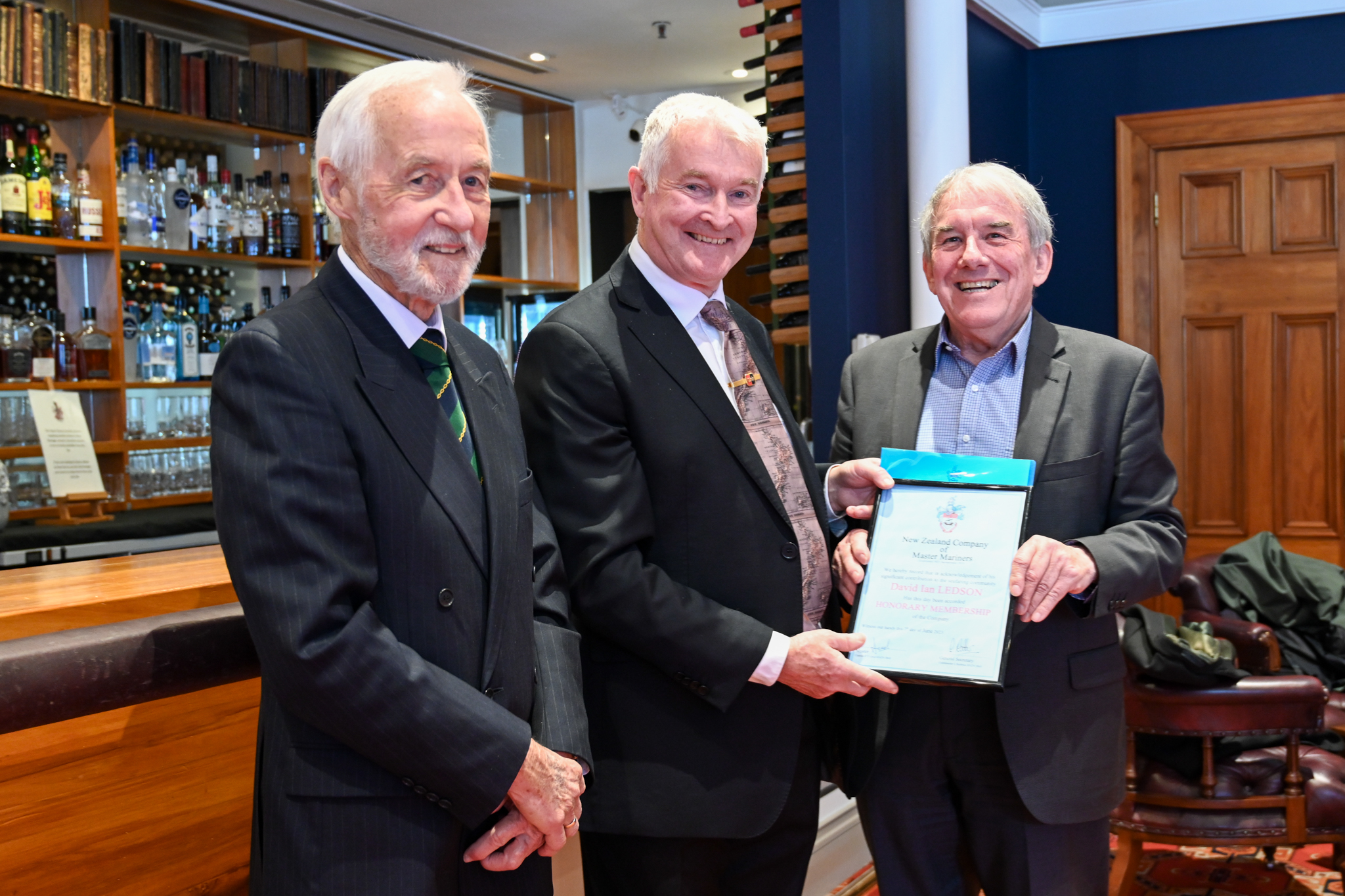
Ledson (right) is presented with honorary membership to the New Zealand Company of Master Mariners by the vice-regal consort, Richard Davies (centre), at the Wellington branch of the company on 8 November 2023, while the Wellington branch warden, John Mansell, watches on

In 1990, Ledson was awarded the New Zealand 1990 Commemoration Medal. In the 2000 Queen's Birthday Honours, he was appointed an Officer of the New Zealand Order of Merit. He was made an honorary member of the New Zealand Company of Master Mariners in November 2023.

Military offices
Preceded by Rear Admiral Peter McHaffie	Chief of Navy; 2004–2009	Succeeded by Rear Admiral Tony Parr
