= Tony Parr =

New Zealand navy officer (born 1955)

Anthony J. Parr
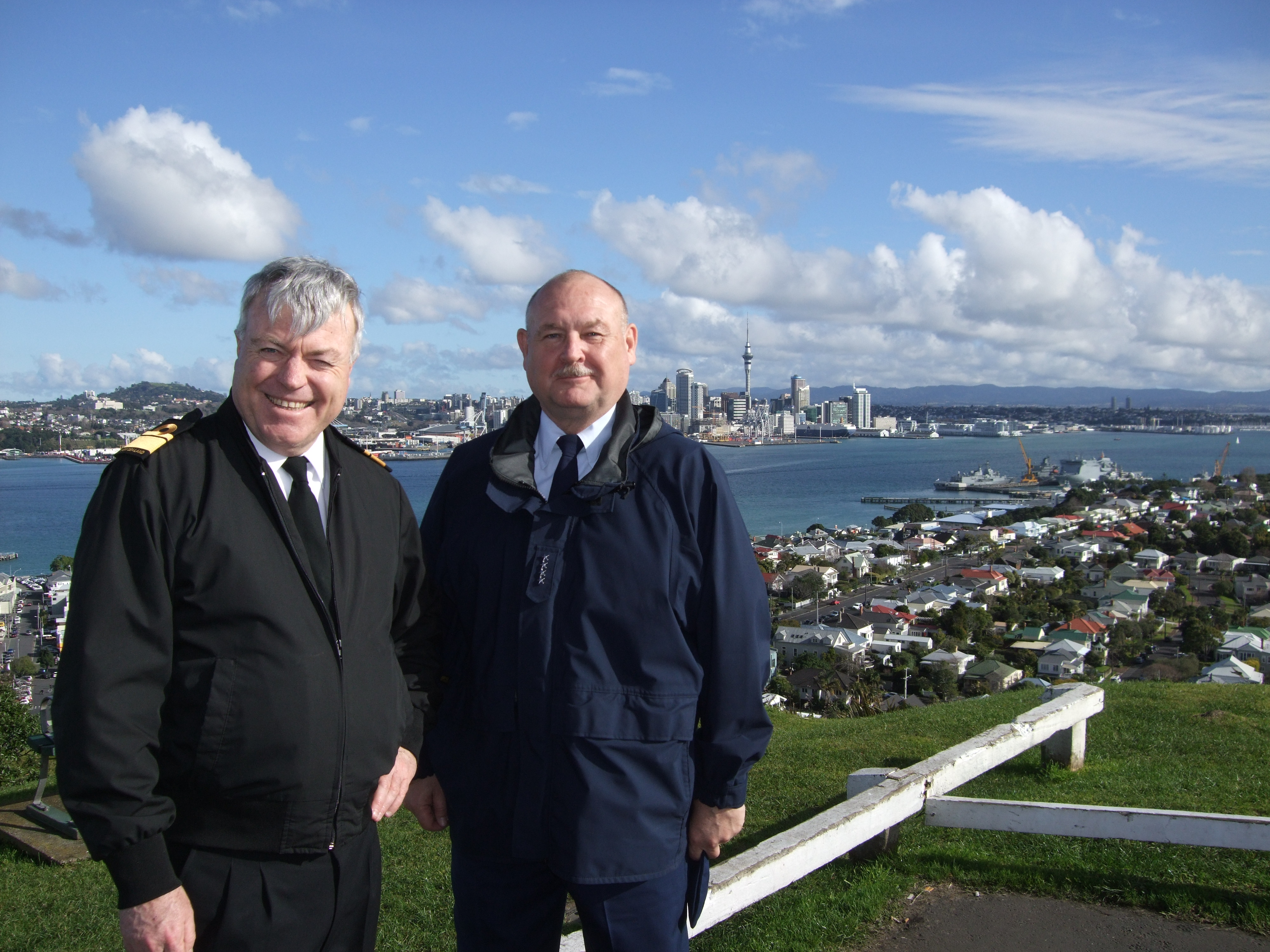
- Parr (left) with Admiral Thad Allen of the US Coast Guard in July 2009
- Born: 4 August 1955 (age 71); Wellington, New Zealand
- Military career
- Allegiance: New Zealand
- Branch: Royal New Zealand Navy
- Service years: 1980–2012
- Rank: Rear Admiral
- Commands: Chief of Navy; HMNZS Te Mana; HMNZS Waikato; HMNZS Pukaki
- Awards: Officer of the New Zealand Order of Merit; Member of the Royal Victorian Order

Rear Admiral Anthony Jonathan Parr, ONZM, MVO (born 4 August 1955) was the Chief of the Royal New Zealand Navy from April 2009 to November 2012. He was succeeded by Rear Admiral Jack Steer.

== Early life ==
Parr was born in Wellington, New Zealand. He was raised in Fiji and attended New Plymouth Boys' High School as a boarder. He graduated from the University of Waikato in 1977 with a Bachelor of Social Science in politics and after completing the first year of a Bachelor of Law degree in 1979, he joined the Royal New Zealand Navy in January 1980 in the rank of sub lieutenant.

== Naval career ==
During his naval career, Parr served aboard the ships HMNZS Taranaki, HMNZS Canterbury and HMNZS Wellington. He also served as the commanding officer of HMNZS Pukaki, HMNZS Waikato and HMNZS Te Mana.

Since leaving Te Mana, Parr served at HQ Joint Forces New Zealand, holding a number of senior positions in the RNZN.

In the 1986 New Zealand Royal Visit Honours, Parr was appointed a Member of the Royal Victorian Order. In the 2012 New Year Honours, he was appointed an Officer of the New Zealand Order of Merit for services to the State.

== Dates of rank ==
Rank	Date	Role
CDR	Nov 1995	Commanding Officer – HMNZS Waikato
CAPT	13 March 2002	Assistant Chief of Naval Staff (Personnel)
CDRE	30 November 2007	Deputy Chief of Navy
RADM	1 April 2009	Chief of Navy

Military offices
Preceded by Rear Admiral David Ledson	Chief of Navy; 2009–2012	Succeeded by Rear Admiral Jack Steer
