= The Cambridge History of Southeast Asia =

1992 history book edited by Nicholas Tarling

- Author: Nicholas Tarling
- Country: United Kingdom
- Language: English
- Genre: Asian history
- Publisher: Cambridge University Press
- Published: 1992
- No. of books: 2

The Cambridge History of Southeast Asia is a 2-volume history book published by Cambridge University Press (CUP) covering the history of Southeast Asia. It was edited by Nicholas Tarling.

== Contents ==
The volumes of the series are as follows:

1. From Early Times to c.1800 (edited by Nicholas Tarling), 1992. ISBN 9780521355056
2. The Nineteenth and Twentieth Centuries (edited by Nicholas Tarling), 1992. ISBN 9780521355063
