= Robert Smellie (judge) =

New Zealand lawyer and judge (1930–2025)

The Honourable Robert Smellie CNZM KC

Judge of the High Court
- In office 1985–1998

Personal details
- Born: Robert Philip Smellie; 30 August 1930 Dunedin, New Zealand
- Died: 23 December 2025 (aged 95) Auckland, New Zealand
- Spouse: Lyndsay Ann Craig (m. 1959; died 2008)
- Children: 3
- Education: University of Auckland
- Occupation: Lawyer; judge

Robert Philip Smellie CNZM KC (20 August 1930 – 23 December 2025) was a New Zealand lawyer and judge. He was appointed Queen's Counsel in 1979, and served as a High Court judge from 1985 until 1998.

== Early life and family ==
Smellie was born in Dunedin on 20 August 1930, the son of Winifred Lilian and Peter Orr Smellie. He was educated at Otago Boys’ High School, and went on to study at the University of Auckland, graduating with a Bachelor of Laws degree in 1958.

In 1959, Smellie married Lyndsay Ann Craig, and the couple had three children.

== Legal career ==
Smellie began his legal career with Grierson, Jackson and Partners (later Simpson Grierson). He was appointed Queen's Counsel on 20 August 1979. Between 1982 and 1985, he served as chair of the Equal Opportunities Tribunal. He was appointed to the High Court bench on 18 December 1985.

After retiring from full-time judicial work in 1998, Smellie continued to serve as an acting High Court judge until 2002. He then served as a judge of the Fiji Court of Appeal until 2007.

== Honours and awards ==
In 1990, Smellie was awarded the New Zealand 1990 Commemoration Medal. On 9 August 1998, he was granted retention of the title The Honourable for life, in recognition of this services as a judge of the High Court. He was appointed a Companion of the New Zealand Order of Merit in the 2000 Queen's Birthday Honours, for services as a judge of the High Court.

== Death ==
Smellie died on 23 December 2025 at the age of 95. He had been predeceased by his wife, Lyndsay Smellie, in 2008.
