= Jenny Carryer =

New Zealand nursing academic

Jenny Carryer CNZM
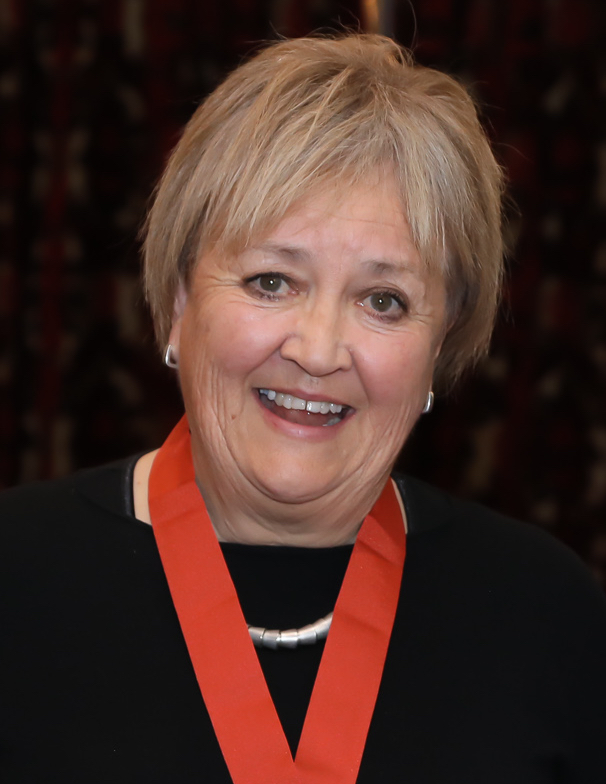
- Carryer in 2020
- Other name: Jennifer Barbara Carryer
- Education: Massey University
- Scientific career
- Workplaces: Massey University
- Thesis: A feminist appraisal of the experience of embodied largeness : a challenge for nursing (1997)
- Website: Massey staff page

Jennifer Barbara Carryer CNZM is a New Zealand nursing academic. She is currently a full professor of nursing at the Massey University and executive director of the New Zealand College of Nurses.

== Academic career ==
Carryer completed a PhD at Massey University in 1997, before joining the staff and rising to full professor in 2011. Her thesis was titled 'A feminist appraisal of the experience of embodied largeness: a challenge for nursing' . Her research interests are nurse practitioners, chronic illness, obesity and gender.

In the 2000 Queen's Birthday Honours, Carryer was appointed a Member of the New Zealand Order of Merit, for services to nursing. In the 2020 New Year Honours, she was promoted to Companion of the New Zealand Order of Merit, for services to health, particularly nursing.

== Selected works ==
- Carryer, Jenny, Glenn Gardner, Sandra Dunn, and Anne Gardner. "The core role of the nurse practitioner: practice, professionalism and clinical leadership." Journal of Clinical Nursing 16, no. 10 (2007): 1818–1825.
- Gardner, Anne, Stewart Hase, Glenn Gardner, Sandra V. Dunn, and Jenny Carryer. "From competence to capability: a study of nurse practitioners in clinical practice." Journal of Clinical Nursing 17, no. 2 (2008): 250–258.
- Flynn, Linda, Jenny Carryer, and Claire Budge. "Organizational attributes valued by hospital, home care, and district nurses in the United States and New Zealand." Journal of Nursing Scholarship 37, no. 1 (2005): 67–72.
- Gardner, Glenn, Jenny Carryer, Anne Gardner, and Sandra Dunn. "Nurse practitioner competency standards: findings from collaborative Australian and New Zealand research." International journal of nursing studies 43, no. 5 (2006): 601–610.
- Poudel, Pratima, and Jenny Carryer. "Girl-trafficking, HIV/AIDS, and the position of women in Nepal." Gender & Development 8, no. 2 (2000): 74–79.
