= 2000 Birthday Honours (New Zealand) =

Awards list for New Zealand

2000 Queen's Birthday Honours
- Previous: 2000 New Year Honours; Next: 2001 New Year Honours
- Type: New Zealand royal honours: Order of New Zealand; New Zealand Order of Merit; Queen's Service Order; Queen's Service Medal; New Zealand Gallantry Star; New Zealand Gallantry Decoration
- Date: 5 June 2000
- Country: New Zealand

Highlights
- Total recipients: 207

The 2000 Queen's Birthday Honours in New Zealand, celebrating the official birthday of Queen Elizabeth II, were appointments made by the Queen in her right as Queen of New Zealand, on the advice of the New Zealand government, to various orders and honours to reward and highlight good works by New Zealanders. They also incorporated gallantry awards, and a special honours list recognising military operational and other service in East Timor. They were announced on 5 June 2000.

The recipients of honours are listed here as they were styled before their new honour.

== Order of New Zealand (ONZ) ==
Ordinary member

- His Eminence Cardinal Thomas Stafford Williams – of Wellington; Catholic Archbishop of Wellington and Metropolitan of New Zealand.
Tom Williams

== New Zealand Order of Merit ==
=== Principal Companion (PCNZM) ===
- The Right Reverend Te Whakahuihui Vercoe MBE – of Rotorua. For services to Māori and the community.

=== Distinguished Companion (DCNZM) ===
- (Isoleen) Heather Begg OBE – of Sydney, Australia. For services to opera.
- Russell Coutts CBE – of Auckland. For services to yachting, especially the 2000 America's Cup challenge.
- Grace Shellie Hollander CBE JP – of Christchurch. For services to the community.
- The Honourable Douglas Lorimer Kidd MP – of Blenheim. For services as Speaker of the House of Representatives, 1996–99.
- Professor Vincent O'Sullivan – of Wellington. For services to literature.
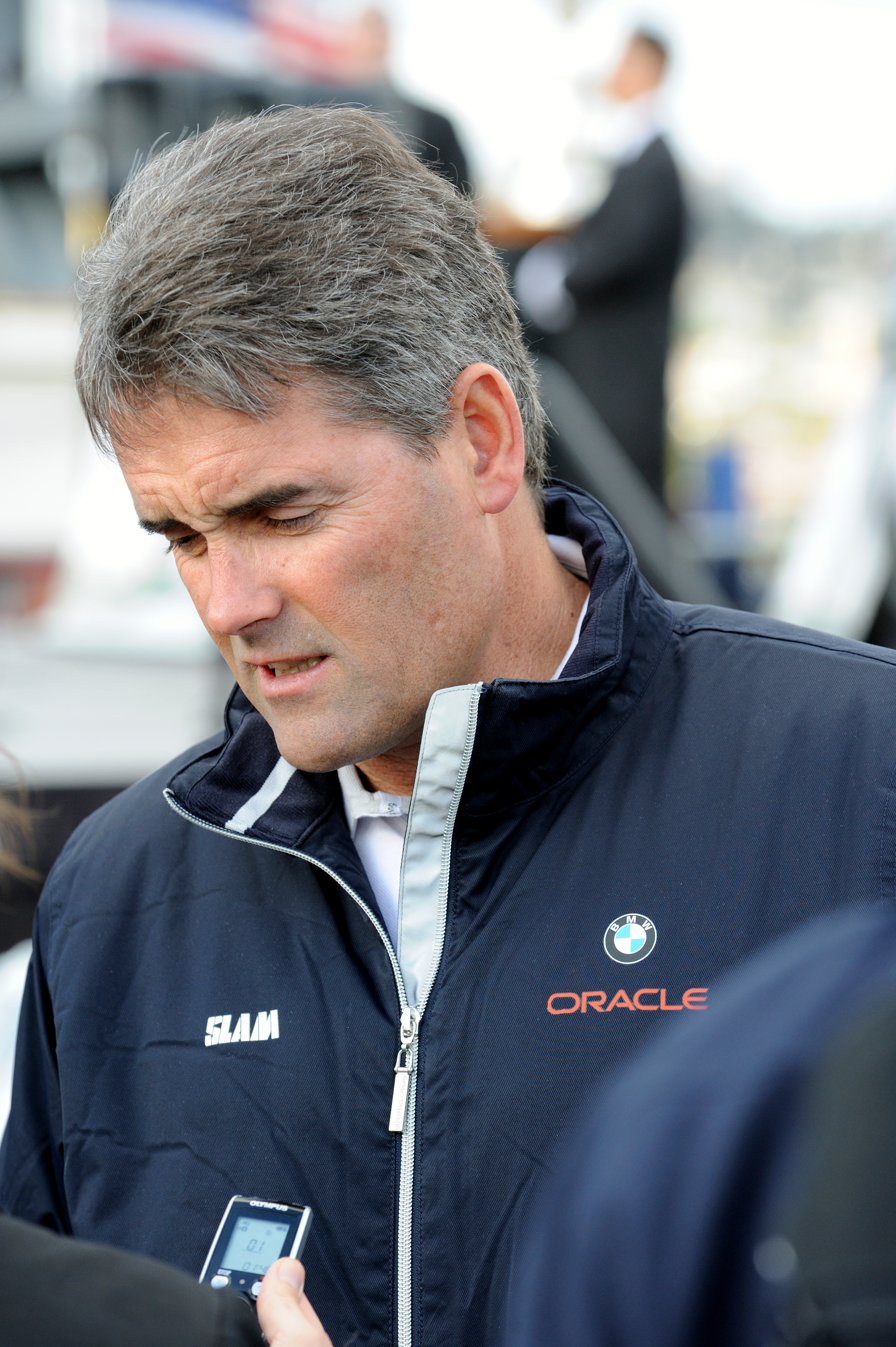
Russell Coutts

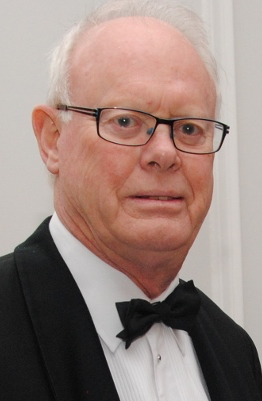
Doug Kidd

=== Companion (CNZM) ===
- Gretchen Albrecht – of Auckland. For services to painting.
- Dr Ruth Helen Butterworth – of Auckland. For services to tertiary education.
- Spencer Waemura Carr JP – of Hāwera. For services to Māori.
- Judy Marie Cooper – of Christchurch. For services to the elderly and education.
- Sir Geoffrey Sandford Cox CBE – of Gloucestershire, United Kingdom. For services to New Zealand and New Zealand interests in the United Kingdom.
- Marjorie Mary Foy (Sister Mary Foy) – of Auckland. For services to the community.
- Stuart Alisdair Macaskill QSO JP – of Upper Hutt. For services to local government.
- Juliet Peter (Judith Eleanor Cowan) – of Wellington. For services to the arts.
- Emeritus Professor Bryan Passmore Philpott – of Wellington. For services to economics.
- Wolfgang Rosenberg – of Christchurch. For services to economics and tertiary education.
- The Honourable Robert Philip Smellie QC – of Auckland. For services as a judge of the High Court.
- The Right Honourable Robert James Tizard – of Auckland. For public services.
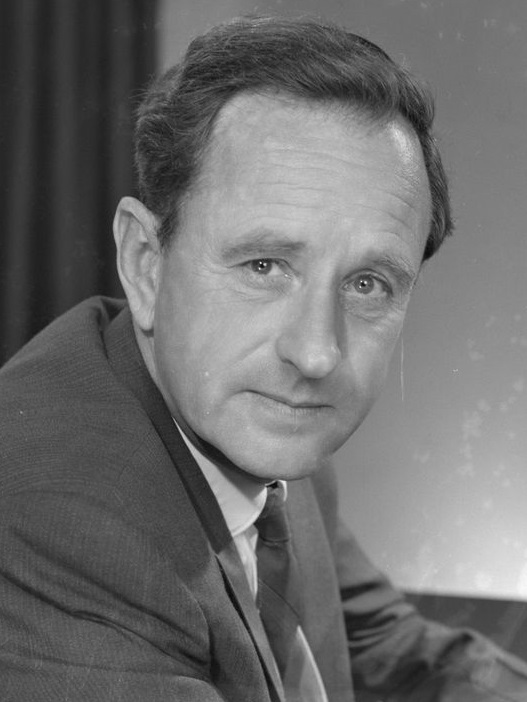
Bob Tizard

=== Officer (ONZM) ===
- Carol Margaret Archie – of Auckland. For services to Māori and journalism.
- Leigh Carol Brewer (Mann) – of Wellington. For services to dance.
- Colin Chan – of Auckland. For services to the community.
- Gordon Charles Ell – of North Shore City. For services to journalism and conservation.
- Robert Bertram Keith Gardiner – of Hamilton. For services to art and tourism.
- Acting Colonel Philip John Gibbons – New Zealand Army.
- Riripeti Patricia Haretuku – of Auckland. For services to Māori health.
- Raymond Benjamin Thomas Hawthorne – of Auckland. For services to the theatre.
- Ian Leslie Haynes – of Auckland. For services to the legal profession.
- Peter Gordon Henson JP – of Hamilton. For services to the newspaper industry.
- George Randolph Hudson – of Waiheke Island. For services to tourism and the public transport industry.
- Emeritus Professor Clifford Hugh Greenfield Irvine – of Christchurch. For services to veterinary science.
- Russell Ian Kerr QSM – of Christchurch. For services to ballet and dance.
- Commodore David Ian Ledson – Royal New Zealand Navy.
- William Rex Manning – of Wellington. For services to hockey.
- Colin Albert Murdoch – of Timaru. For services to inventing.
- Anne Elizabeth Murphy – of Auckland. For services to health administration and the community.
- The Very Reverend John Stewart Murray – of Raumati Beach. For services to the community.
- Dr John Murray Neutze – of Auckland. For services to cardiology.
- Dr Edwin Richard Nye – of Dunedin. For services to medicine and the community.
- Gordon Joseph Pullar JP – of Gore. For services to farming and the community.
- Ronald Fong Sang – of Auckland. For services to architecture and the arts.
- Alan James Sefton – of Auckland. For services to yachting.
- Ronald John Sharp – of Hamilton. For services to dairy farming.
- Cynthia Emmeline van Asch – of Christchurch. For services to the disabled.
- Carla Marja Olga van Zon – of Wellington. For services to the arts.

Honorary

- Francesco de Angelis – of Milan, Italy. For services to yachting and New Zealand–Italy relations.
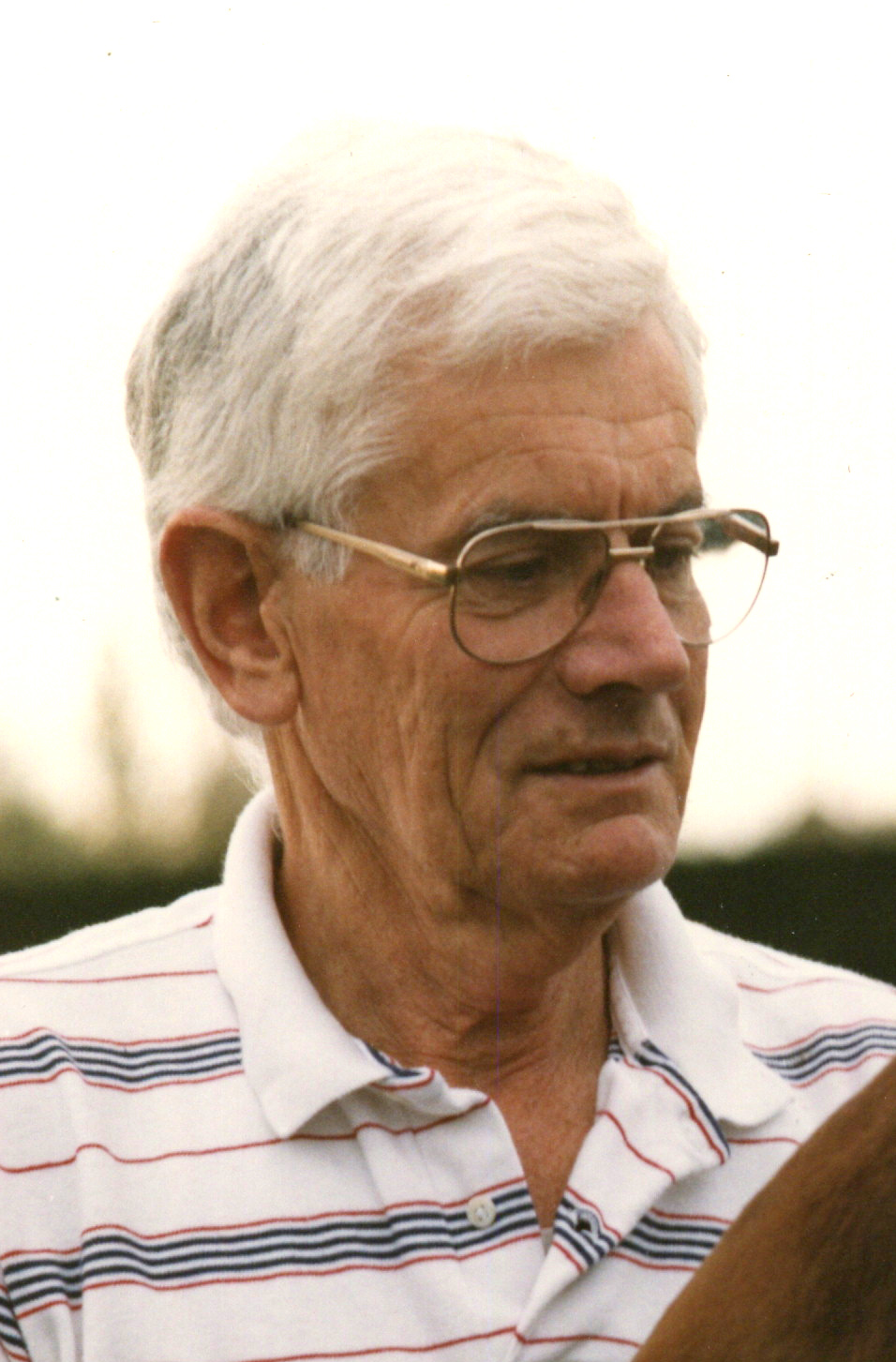
Cliff Irvine

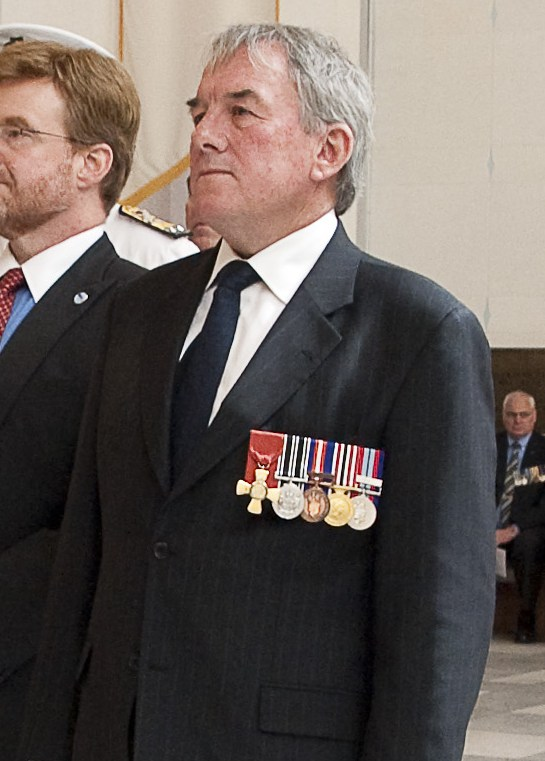
David Ledson

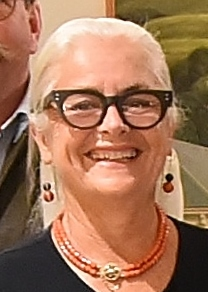
Carla van Zon

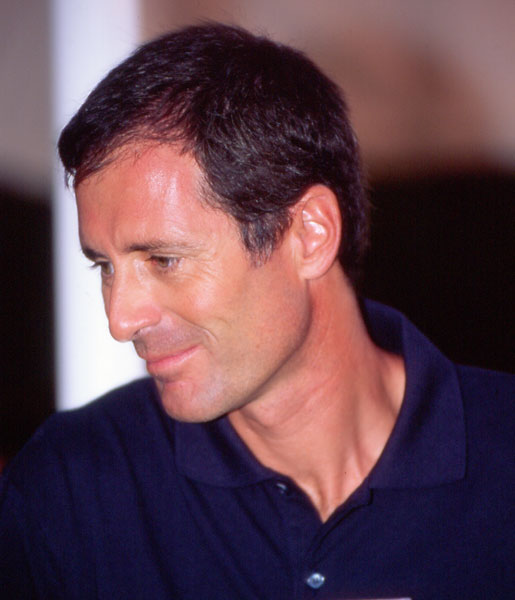
Francesco de Angelis

=== Member (MNZM) ===
- Joseph Johnston Arrell – of Te Awamutu. For services to the community.
- Rosemary Jocelyn Barnes – of Auckland. For services to music.
- David Beaumont – of Blenheim. For services to music.
- Collis John Blake – of Levin. For services to farming and the community.
- Trevor Herbert Bremner – of New Plymouth. For services to music and the community.
- Rhys Philip Buckingham – of Nelson. For services to ecology.
- Alan Kenneth Burgess – of Ashburton. For services to the New Zealand Fire Service.
- Dr Patricia Claire Cairney – of Wellington. For services to the community.
- Dr Jennifer Barbara Carryer – of Palmerston North. For services to nursing.
- Vilma Bernice Cocker – of Invercargill. For services to the community.
- Dr Diana Alison Cook – of Owaka. For services to the community.
- Squadron Leader Ian Edward Davie-Martin – Royal New Zealand Air Force.
- Edith Urutawhana Dockery JP – of Kawhia. For services to the community.
- Richard John Drake – of Tangiteroria. For services to farming, conservation and the community.
- Dr Christine Shirley Forster – of Auckland. For services to the community.
- Gary Richard Froggatt JP – of Auckland. For services to scouting and the community.
- Kathleen Sally Frykberg – of Wellington. For services to business and the community.
- Karen Guilliland – of Christchurch. For services to midwifery.
- The Right Reverend Monsignor Timothy Francis Hannigan – of Napier. For services to the community.
- Gordon Edgar Hasell – of Timaru. For services to mountaineering and search and rescue.
- Thomas Cosgrove Hayes – of Rotorua. For services to business and inventing.
- Rosaline Ann Hobbs – of Auckland. For services to the community.
- Flight Sergeant Craig Douglas Hughan – Royal New Zealand Air Force (Retired).
- John Rex Inder – of Grovetown. For services to surgery.
- Colin McDonald King – of Rolleston. For services to shearing and the wool industry.
- Warwick Norwood Larkins JP – of Dunedin. For services to cricket.
- Winifred Lawrence – of Waitakere (West Auckland). For services to swimming.
- Ronald Morton Mercer Leggett – of Lower Hutt. For services to the disabled.
- Helen Fay Love – of Ashburton. For services to the community.
- Gordon Frank Lowry – of Rangiora. For services to the Cancer Society.
- Shona Margaret McCullagh – of Leigh. For services to dance.
- Peter Brendon Marshall – of North Shore City, detective superintendent, New Zealand Police.
- Raymond Edward Meinung – of Dunedin. For services to wrestling.
- Ina Frances (Frankie) Mills – of Blackball. For services to the community.
- Alan Miall Moss – of New Plymouth. For services to sport and the community.
- Alan George Nixon – of Wellington. For services to social welfare.
- Dominic James O'Sullivan – of Reefton. For services to returned services personnel and the community.
- Ada Mary Adeline Paterson JP – of Waitakere City. For services to the community.
- Maureen Alys Potter – of Taupō. For services to music.
- Ataur Rahman – of North Shore City. For services to race relations.
- Dr Nagalingam Rasalingam QSM – of Auckland. For services to ethnic and refugee communities.
- Aaron Tony Slight – of Masterton. For services to motor sport.
- Eardrie Adam Stewart – of Dunedin. For services to pipe bands.
- Ruth Joyce Todd – of Christchurch. For services to women and literature.
- Cyril Kenneth George Townsend – of Lower Hutt. For services to cultural affairs.
- Timothy George Twist – of Napier. For services to education and the community.
- Patricia Ellen Weaver – of Hastings. For services to bowls.
- Jacqueline Jill White JP – of Palmerston North. For services to local-body and community affairs.
- Brenda Wilson – of Wellington. For services to nursing.
- Dorothy Elizabeth Wilson JP – of Waitakere City. For services to local-body and community affairs.

Additional

- Major Jeremy Dan St Clair Ramsden – Royal New Zealand Armoured Corps.

Honorary

- Minoru Kasuya – of Palmerston North. For services to education.
- Lammert (Max) Visch – of Christchurch. For services to the community.
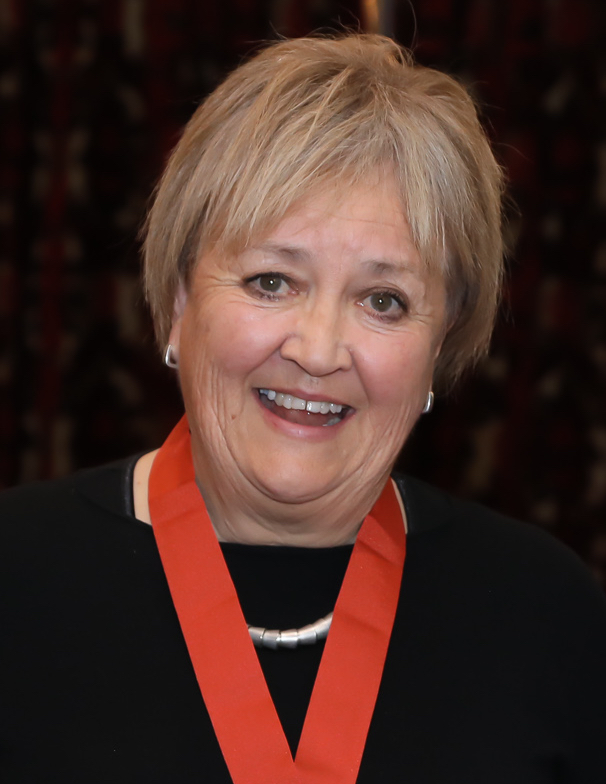
Jenny Carryer

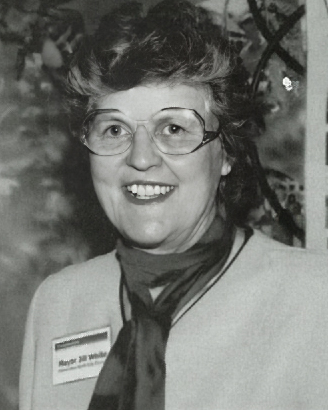
Jill White

== Companion of the Queen's Service Order (QSO) ==
=== For community service ===
- Doreen Teresa Chandler – of Auckland.
- Keith Robert Chapple – of Kakahi.
- Pakaariki Harrison – of Coromandel.
- Dorothy Elizabeth McGray – of Waitakere City.
- David James Mays Mason – of Auckland.
- Louise Durant Petherbridge – of Dunedin.
- Timi (Jim) Rawiri – of Huntly.
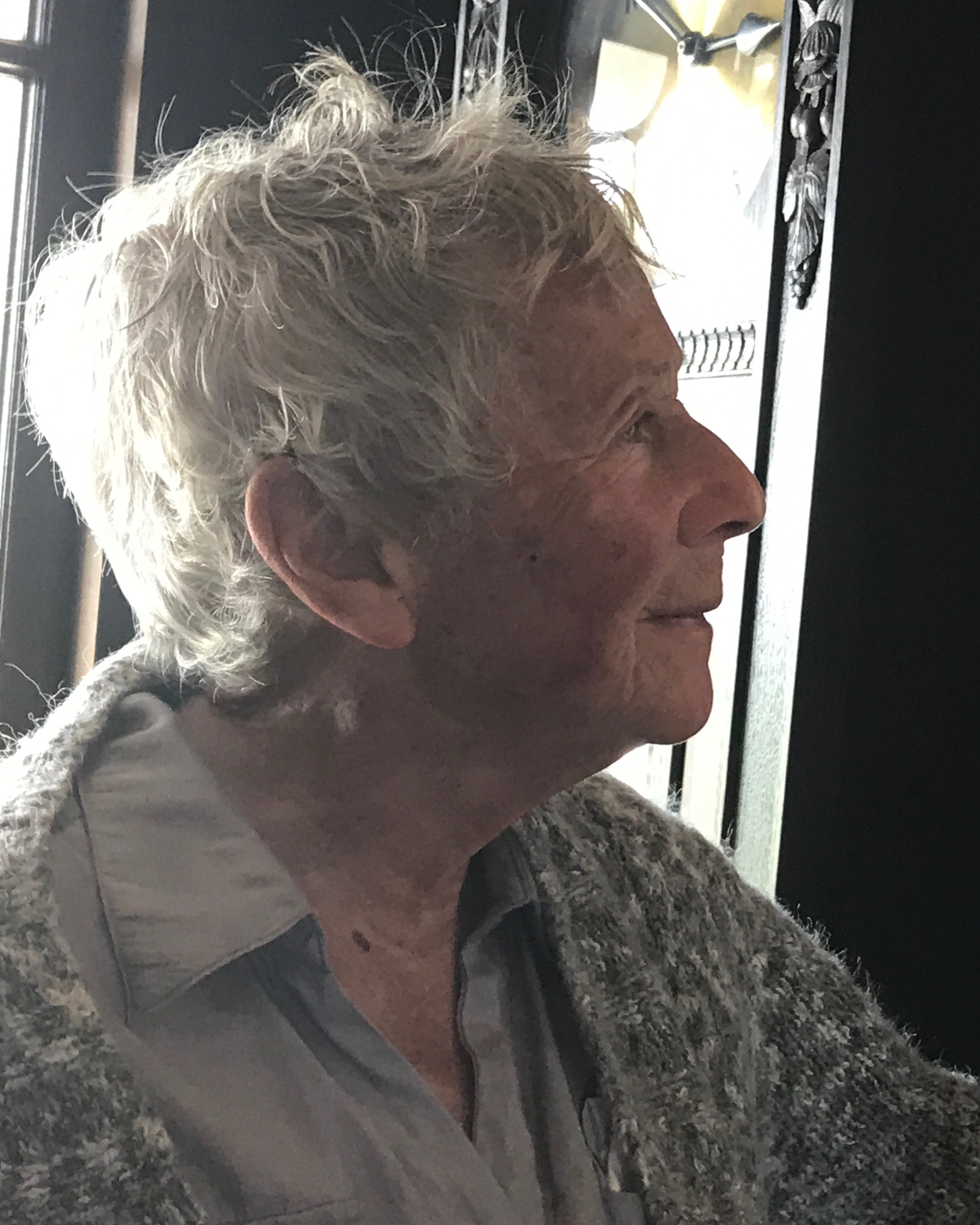
Louise Petherbridge

=== For public services ===
- Tuhuatahi Tui Adams – of Hamilton].
- David Constable Close – of Christchurch.
- David Edgar Crockett – of Whangārei.
- Bruce Nevile Hamilton – of Westport.
- Dr Murray Laugesen – of Waiheke Island.
- Ross Roderick Spence – of Auckland.
- Barbara Judith Walker – of Kaikohe.
- Graham Richard White – of North Shore City.

== Queen's Service Medal (QSM) ==
=== For community service ===
- Douglas Alexander Baird – of Timaru.
- Lily Christina Mary Baker – of Hastings.
- Jean Bassett – of Taumarunui.
- Donald Raymond Peter Bethune – of Hamilton.
- Margaret Nancy Booth – of Gisborne.
- Benjamin Graham Carr – of Christchurch.
- Noelene Kathleen Casey – of Upper Hutt.
- George Gordon Cleverley JP – of Levin.
- Robert Collins JP – of Wainuiomata.
- Te Whakapumautanga Downs – of Taupō.
- Dr George West Emerson – of Dunedin.
- The Very Reverend Dr John Oliver Evans – of Auckland.
- Fay MacDonald Giles – of Auckland.
- Barbara Anne Griffin JP – of Orewa.
- Maureen Winifred Okeroa Jones – of Stewart Island.
- Raymond William Jones – of Stewart Island.
- Lois Audrey Kelly – of Morrinsville.
- Arieta Leoititi Vila Kerr – of Invercargill.
- John (Hoani) Apiata Komene JP – of Auckland.
- Chana Esther Lust – of Wellington.
- June McGregor – of Gisborne.
- Eric McKellar – of Auckland.
- Verna Elaine Mossong JP – of North Shore City.
- Nuku Roti Rapana – of Auckland.
- Jean Heather Robinson – of Auckland.
- Jean Nancy Ruddenklau – of Christchurch.
- Kurt Schwarz – of Wellington.
- Harbans Singh-Randhawa – of Ngāruawāhia.
- Betty Murray Thomson – of Masterton.
- The Reverend Mataara Raureti Waara – of Taupō.
- Mavis Isabel Warren – of Upper Hutt.
- Maureen Francis Emily Whiting – of Christchurch.

=== For public services ===
- Alison Mamie Anderson – of Temuka.
- Alison Ann Broad – of Invercargill.
- Merle Donnell – of North Shore City.
- Donald James Geddes – of Whakatāne.
- Margaret Ann Gibson Smith – of Warkworth.
- William Cuthbert Guy JP – of Auckland.
- John Frederick Haynes – of Nelson; senior constable, New Zealand Police.
- Brent Arthur Holmes – of Auckland; inspector, New Zealand Police.
- Joan (Johnny) Hudson – of Whakatāne.
- Francis Murray Hustler – of Orewa.
- Janice Lorraine Jeffery – of Tauranga.
- Leslie Allan Jeffery – of Tauranga.
- Charles Edmund Jones JP – of Wellington.
- Lesley Dawn Keast JP – of Christchurch.
- Colin George Kennedy JP – of Wellington.
- John Linton King – of Manukau City.
- Maureen Elaine Kós – of Rawene.
- Douglas Henry Robert Laskey JP – of Hamilton.
- Wilfred Brian Litten – of Auckland.
- Marlene Joyce McKerrow – of Oamaru.
- Margaret Ellen McNamara – of Dargaville.
- Frederick Herbert Matthews – of Wanganui.
- John Sydney Moran – of Porirua; senior sergeant, New Zealand Police.
- Jack Morris – of Southbrook.
- Brian Henry Palmer – of Christchurch.
- Nelson Francis Rangi – of Kawerau.
- The Reverend Harvey Te Hawe Ruru – of Nelson.
- Brian Douglas Seymour – of Alexandra; senior Sergeant, New Zealand Police.
- James Arnold Sutton JP – of Oratia.
- Michael David Tod – of Pukekohe.
- Patricia Dulcie Wells JP – of Urenui.
- Herbert George Westbrooke – of Tokoroa; chief fire officer, Mangakino Volunteer Fire Brigade.

== New Zealand Gallantry Decoration (NZGD) ==
- Lieutenant Colonel John Charles Dyer – Royal Regiment of New Zealand Artillery. For actions with the United Nations Mission in Sierra Leone.

== Special list for East Timor ==
=== New Zealand Order of Merit ===
Appointments to the New Zealand Order of Merit were for military operational and other service in East Timor.

==== Companion (CNZM) ====
Additional

- Major General Peter John Cosgrove AC MC – Generals' List, Australian Army.
- Brigadier Martyn John Dunne – Brigadiers' List, New Zealand Army.
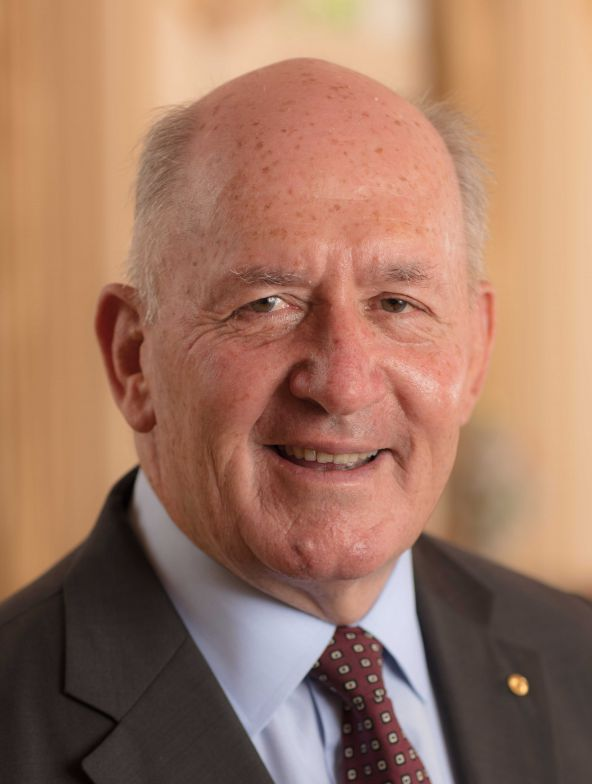
Peter Cosgrove

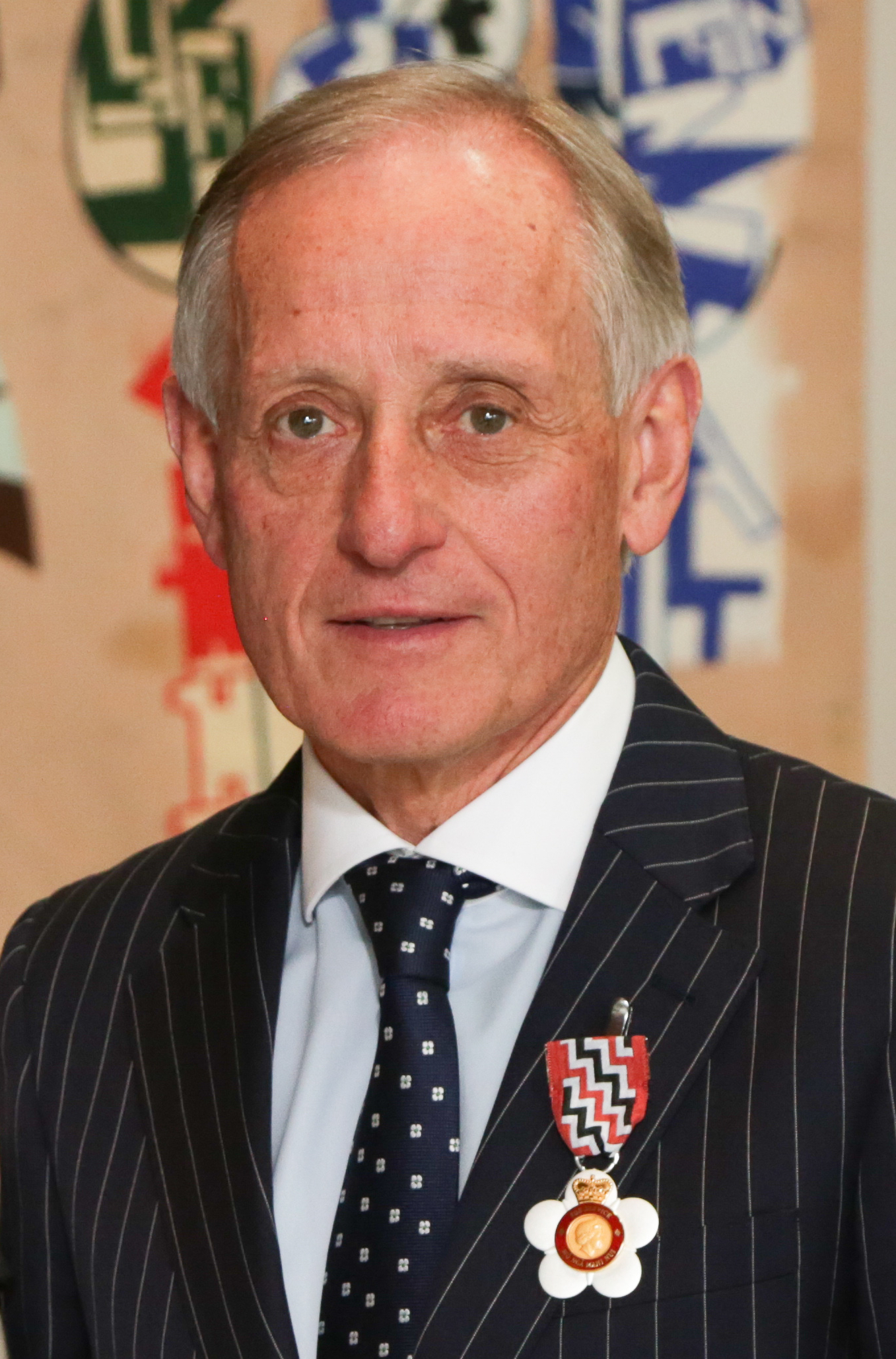
Martyn Dunne

==== Officer (ONZM) ====
Additional

- Dr Andrew Steven Ladley – of Lower Hutt.
- Raymond Leslie Sutton – of Rotorua; inspector (temporary superintendent), New Zealand Police.
- Commander Warren Michael Cummins – Royal New Zealand Navy.
- Lieutenant Kevin Jeffery Burnett – Royal New Zealand Infantry Regiment.
- Wing Commander Peter Maxwell Port ADC – Royal New Zealand Air Force.

==== Member (MNZM) ====
Additional

- June Maureen Harré – of Christchurch.
- Judy Margaret Lessing (Popkin) QSO – of New York, United States of America.
- Lieutenant Commander Dean James Rugby McDougall – Royal New Zealand Navy.
- Major Jon Burton Knight – Royal New Zealand Infantry Regiment.
- Major John Garry Howard – Royal New Zealand Infantry Regiment.
- Captain Christopher John Parsons – New Zealand Special Air Service.
- Acting Captain Rua Te Atawhai Pani – Royal New Zealand Army Logistic Regiment.
- Flying Officer Jane Louise Davies – Royal New Zealand Air Force.
- Warrant Officer Class One George Carruth – Royal New Zealand Army Logistic Regiment.
- Warrant Officer Patrick Joseph Smith – Royal New Zealand Air Force.
- Chief Petty Officer Gunnery Instructor Ricky John Derksen – Royal New Zealand Navy.
- Flight Sergeant Richard James Sinclair – Royal New Zealand Air Force.
- Corporal Paul Christopher Albert – Corps of Royal New Zealand Engineers.
- Corporal Jacinda Cherie MacDonald – Royal New Zealand Army Medical Corps.

=== Queen's Service Medal (QSM) ===
==== For public services ====
Awards were for public services in East Timor.

- Deborah Bickler – of London, United Kingdom.
- Barry Robert Hay – of Wanganui.
- Peter John Burt – of Timaru; detective sergeant (temporary inspector), New Zealand Police.
- Bruce Trevor Davies – of Rotorua; constable (temporary sergeant), New Zealand Police.
- Te Rangituamatotoru Maniapoto – of Wanganui; constable (temporary sergeant), New Zealand Police.

=== New Zealand Gallantry Star (NZGS) ===
- Colonel Neville John Reilly ONZM – Colonels' List, New Zealand Army. For actions in East Timor.

=== New Zealand Gallantry Decoration (NZGD) ===
- Squadron Leader Logan Charles Cudby – Royal New Zealand Air Force. For actions in East Timor.
