= Victor Purcell =

British sinologist

Victor William Williams Saunders Purcell CMG (26 January 1896 – 2 January 1965) was a British colonial public servant, historian, poet, and Sinologist in Malaya (now Malaysia).

He was educated at Bancroft's School and joined the British Army as an officer in 1914. He fought in France in the First World War and was severely wounded in combat on two occasions. He was taken prisoner by the Germans in 1918 and spent the remainder of the war in a POW camp.

After the war, Purcell entered Trinity College, Cambridge under the veteran admissions scheme to study history. At Cambridge, he was editor of Granta and secretary of The Cambridge Union.

He joined the Malayan Civil Service in 1921 and chose to specialize in Chinese affairs. After some years of language study in China, he embarked on a twenty-five year career in the Chinese secretariat of the MCS.

In 1926 he spent seven months as District Officer on Christmas Island in the Indian Ocean, with wide-ranging but largely undemanding responsibilities in that remote mining community (Magistrate, Assistant District Judge, Port Officer, Port Health Officer, Postal Agent, Assistant Protector of the Chinese, and other responsibilities).

He became particularly interested in the topic of Chinese education and in 1939 returned to Cambridge where he wrote a dissertation on the topic, drawing on his experiences among the Chinese community in Malaya, that was accepted for a Ph.D.

He returned to Southeast Asia during the Second World War and was involved in information and publicity. He finished the war with the rank of colonel, having served with Louis Mountbatten, 1st Earl Mountbatten of Burma in the South East Asia Command at Ceylon.

From 1949 he lectured in Far Eastern History at Cambridge University and gained the degrees of Doctor of Philosophy and Litt.D (Cantab.) During this period he published a mock epic poem The Sweeniad under the pseudonym Myra Buttle (Secker & Warburg 1958), which parodied the style of T. S. Eliot and which was subject to a long, mostly favorable article by the eminent American man of letters Edmund Wilson.

In 1978 he was honoured by a postage stamp of Christmas Island. In 1970 he had a collection of essays in his memory.

== Bibliography ==
- Victor Purcell: Early Penang, Penang 1928
- Victor Purcell: The Further Side of No Man's Land, London 1929
- Victor Purcell: An Index to the Chinese Written Language on a New Non-radical System with Reference to the Dictionaries of Kanghsi and Giles, Singapore 1929
- Victor Purcell: The Spirit of Chinese Poetry, and original essay, Singapore 1929
- Victor Purcell: Problems of Chinese Education, London 1936
- Victor Purcell: The Dog and the Don, Singapore 1938
- Victor Purcell: Chinese Evergreen, the story of a journey across south China, London 1938
- Victor Purcell: Cadmus: The Poet and the World, Melbourne 1944
- Victor Purcell: Malaya: Outline of a Colony, London 1946
- Victor Purcell: The Chinese in Malaya, London 1948; (Chinese translation), Singapore 1950
- Victor Purcell: The Position of the Chinese in Southeast Asia, New York 1950
- Victor Purcell: The Chinese in Southeast Asia, London 1951; 2nd impression 1952; new edition 1964; (Chinese translation), Taipei 1966
- Victor Purcell: The Colonial Period in Southeast Asia, a historical sketch (mimeograph), New York 1953
- Victor Purcell: Malaya: Communist or Free, London 1954
- Victor Purcell: The Chinese in Modern Malaya, Singapore 1956
- Victor Purcell: The Sweeniad, signed Myra Buttle, New York: Sagamore Press, 1957, London 1958. (The identification of this pseudonym was published by Edmund Wilson in 1966 in The Bit Between my Teeth.)
- Victor Purcell: Toynbee in Elysium, a fantasy in one act, signed Myra Buttle, London 1959
- Victor Purcell: The Bitches's Brew or the Plot against Bertrand Russell, signed Myra Buttle, London 1960
- Victor Purcell: The Revolution of Southeast Asia, London 1962
- Victor Purcell: The Boxer Uprising, a background study, Cambridge 1963
- Victor Purcell: Malaysia, London 1965
- Victor Purcell: Memoirs of a Malayan Official, London 1965
- Victor Purcell: South and East Asia since 1800, Cambridge 1965
- Hai Ding Chiang: Sino-British mercantile relations in Singapore's entrepot trade, 1870-1915. In: J. Chen und N. Tarling (Hrsg.): Studies in the social history of China and Southeast Asia: essays in memory of Victor Purcell. Cambridge University Press, Cambridge, UK 1970. S. 247–266.
