= Ruth Butterworth =

New Zealand political studies academic (1934–2020)

Ruth Butterworth CNZM
- Born: Ruth Helen Butterworth; 21 August 1934; England
- Died: 29 January 2020 (aged 85); Auckland, New Zealand

Academic background
- Education: University of Oxford
- Thesis: The structure and organisation of some Catholic lay organisations in Australia and Great Britain: a comparative study with special reference to the function of the organisations as social and political pressure groups (1959)

Academic work
- Discipline: Political studies
- Institutions: University of Auckland

Ruth Helen Butterworth CNZM (21 August 1934 – 29 January 2020) was a New Zealand political scientist at the University of Auckland from 1965 until her retirement.

== Biography ==
Born in England, Butterworth studied at the University of Oxford, from where she graduated Master of Arts and, in 1959, DPhil. The title of her doctoral thesis was The structure and organisation of some Catholic lay organisations in Australia and Great Britain: a comparative study with special reference to the function of the organisations as social and political pressure groups.

Butterworth was appointed as a lecturer in political studies at the University of Auckland in 1965. She was a member of the Labour Party and in 1975 she was speculated by media as a likely contender for the Labour Party candidacy for the Onehunga electorate following the retirement of Hugh Watt, but did not put herself forward. She also taught African studies and trade unionism. Her teaching influenced students who became leading politicians, including Helen Clark and Phil Goff. She was a regular contributor to Zealandia, writing on topics including nuclear testing, the Vietnam war, and abortion.

Between 1990 and 1991, Butterworth served as president of the Association of University Staff of New Zealand.

In 1993, Butterworth was awarded the New Zealand Suffrage Centennial Medal. In the 2000 Queen's Birthday Honours, she was appointed a Companion of the New Zealand Order of Merit, for services to tertiary education.

Butterworth died in Auckland on 29 January 2020.
