= 1986 Special Honours (New Zealand) =

Awards list for New Zealand

The 1986 Special Honours in New Zealand were two Special Honours Lists: the first was dated 27 February 1986 and made one appointment to the Queen's Service Order; and the second was dated 31 July 1986, in which six people were awarded the Polar Medal, for good services as members of New Zealand expeditions to Antarctica in recent years.

== Companion of the Queen's Service Order ==
=== For public services ===
- The Right Honourable Sir Philip (Brian Cecil) Moore GCB GCVO CMG – Private Secretary to The Queen since 1977.

== Polar Medal ==
- Gary Henry Lewis – of Wellington; technician, 1979–1980.
- Barrie Cooper McKelvey – of Armidale, New South Wales, Australia; geologist, 1981–1982.
- Peter Robert Nelson – of Whangārei; mechanic, 1984–1985.
- Charles Ashley Roper – of Christchurch; technical officer, 1981.
- Eric John Saxby – of Christchurch; assistant maintenance officer, 1981–1982.
- Leo Bernard Slattery – of Leeston; postmaster, 1984–1985.
