= HMNZS Waikato (F55) =

Leander class frigate of the Royal New Zealand Navy

Coordinates: 35.6528°S 174.5445°E

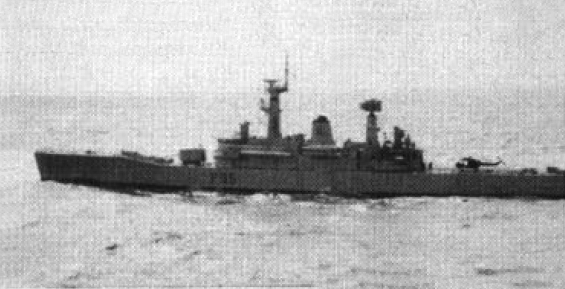

History

New Zealand
- Name: HMNZS Waikato
- Namesake: Waikato province of New Zealand
- Operator: Royal New Zealand Navy
- Builder: Harland and Wolff
- Laid down: January 1964
- Launched: 18 February 1965
- Commissioned: September 1966
- Decommissioned: 1998
- Refit: Major modernisation refit 1986–88
- Home port: Tauranga, New Zealand, but based out of Devonport Naval Base, Auckland
- Identification: F55
- Nickname(s): "The Mighty Y"
- Honours and awards: Armilla Patrol - 1982; Bougainville - Operation Big Talk 1990
- Fate: Sunk on 18 December 2000 as an artificial reef

General characteristics
- Class & type: Leander-class frigate
- Displacement: 2,450 tons standard; 3,200 tons full load
- Length: 372 ft (113 m)
- Beam: 41 ft (12 m)
- Draught: 19 ft (6 m)
- Propulsion: 2 × Babcock & Wilcox boilers delivering steam to; 2 × English Electric geared steam turbines, 30,000 shp to 2 shafts
- Speed: 27 knots (50 km/h)
- Range: 4,600 nautical miles (8,520 km) at 15 knots (28 km/h)
- Complement: 18 officers, 248 sailors
- Sensors & processing systems: Type 965 air search radar. 993 main search radar. 1006 Navigational Radar
- Armament: 2 × 4.5 in (114 mm) guns in twin Mk6 mounting; 1 × quadruple Sea Cat SAM launcher; 2 ×; Mark 32 torpedo tubes for Mark 46 torpedoes; 4 × M2 Browning machine guns.
- Aircraft carried: Originally a Wasp helicopter, later a Kaman SH-2G

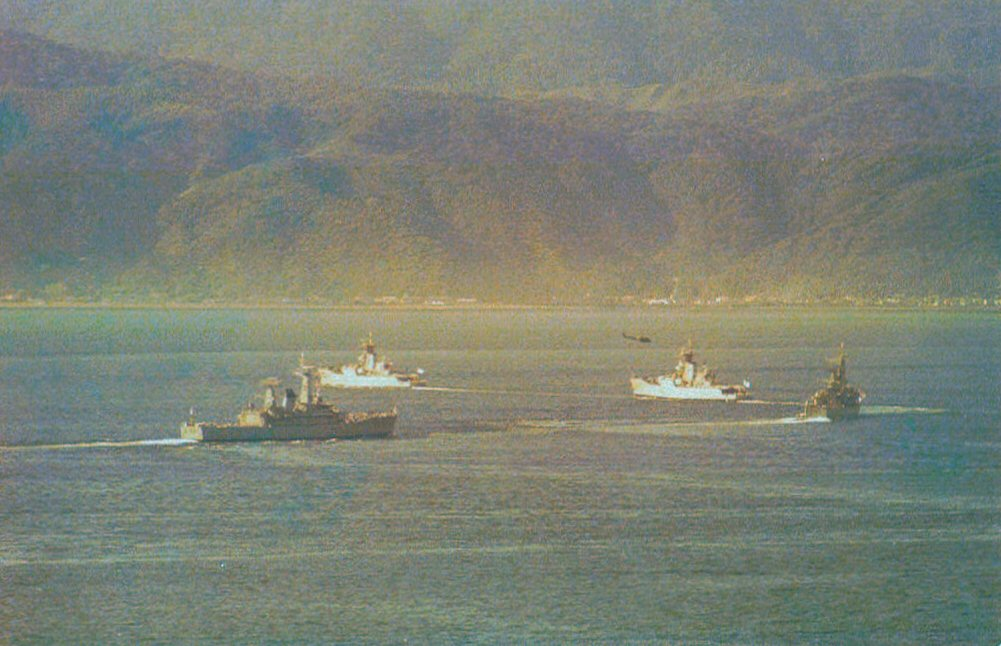
HMNZS Waikato and 3 sister ships in Wellington Harbour 1980

HMNZS Waikato (F55) was a Leander Batch 2TA frigate of the Royal New Zealand Navy (RNZN). She was one of two Leanders built for the RNZN, the other being the Batch 3 HMNZS Canterbury. These two New Zealand ships relieved British ships of the Armilla patrol during the Falklands conflict, freeing British ships for deployment.

== Construction and design ==
Waikato was ordered in 1963 for the RNZN after a delay of more than six years after the order for the Type 12 frigates Otago and Taranaki, which had proved successful in New Zealand service. There was a pressing need to replace the ageing cruiser Royalist and the RNZN's last two operational Loch-class frigates, which carried outdated sonars and anti-submarine weapons and were slow. The Navy board view was that a minimum of six frigates were required for protection of trade including strategic oil shipments to New Zealand, and the improved anti submarine Type 12 was considered 'eminently suited' for New Zealand conditions. Additionally, Cold War tensions were high in the aftermath of the Cuban Missile Crisis with escalating trouble in South East Asia over Vietnam and Indonesia's infiltration into Malaysia and Borneo, led the government to order a third Type 12. The actual suitability of the Leander for New Zealand was questioned by many Royal Naval officers, who regarded the Leander as a short-ranged North Atlantic anti-submarine hunter, designed to operate as part of the radar, air direction, anti-submarine screen of the British aircraft carrier groups being phased out between 1967 and 1971. Nevertheless, the Type 12 rode very well in a seaway, had excellent communications, a much better arranged operations room than the Rothesays, good margin for modernisation, and good workshops and carried 60 days worth of supplies, other than weapons and fuel.

Laid down in January 1964, Waikato was constructed by Harland and Wolff and was delivered in 1966, commissioning into the RNZN in September that year. Displacing 2,450 tons standard and 3,200 tons at full load, Waikato was 372 ft (113 m) long, had a beam of 41 ft (12 m) and a draught of 19 ft (6 m). She was fitted with two Babcock & Wilcox boilers which delivered steam to two English Electric geared steam turbines, producing 30,000 shaft horsepower (22,000 kW) to two shafts, which gave Waikato a top speed of 30 knots (56 km/h; 35 mph). Her range was 4,600 nautical miles (8,520 km) at 15 knots (28 km/h), and she had a complement of 18 officers and 248 sailors.

In terms of armament, Waikato was a fully armed Batch 2 Leander, with Mk 6 twin 4.5-inch guns, a Seacat GWS22 point defence missile, Limbo anti-submarine mortar and Wasp helicopter. She was identical to the Royal Navy Leanders of her group, with 965M LRAW and 177 hull and 199 Variable depth sonars, while her half sister, HMNZS Canterbury was a larger improved Leander, completed in 1971, with a more automated and remote controllable steam plant, a frigate potentially capable of updating with long range bow sonars and Seawolf missiles. HMNZS Canterbury had a similar sensor and weapons to Waikato, because New Zealand could not afford the better screen displays and faster processing systems fitted to 1971/2 RN Leanders, and because cost margins of the last group of the Leanders were tight, it did not receive the more modern sonar and ECM/ESM of the last two Royal Navy Leanders. The Leanders were very expensive for New Zealand and the cost per ton, was just as high as the U.S. Navy Knox class, which were poor seaboats. Some Royal Navy Leanders eventually carried bow sonars in the 1980s with the range of power of AN/SQS-26, and all recently refitted clean bottom Leanders and Rothesays were silenced more effectively than early 1980s Type 22 frigates.

== Operational history ==
For the first nine years of its RNZN service Waikato operated around New Zealand and with the ANZUK naval squadron based at Singapore, which continued in reduced form in 1971–75 with the Royal Navy sending 5 or 6 frigates and destroyers. From 1975 Royal Navy task forces continued to visit New Zealand and Australia for exercises until 1983, when the Falklands commitment and the aftermath effectively ended the Royal Navy's central involvement with the RAN and RNZN. The Naval Board described the late 1970s Five Power Treaty as in a 'sense transitional'.

In 1975–77, Waikato was given an extensive mid-life refit, and essentially modified to the specifications of HMNZS Canterbury with the mortar and VDS wells suppressed and replaced by an enlarged helicopter landing pad, intended for Lynx helicopters that were never ordered and a closed circuit TV system to monitor helicopter operations from the flight deck. Surface and navigation radar was also updated to current RN standards a rather inexpensive alteration. At the time the RN had already rebuilt its early Leanders at great expense with Ikara missiles and computer action automation of weapon systems and the second batch Leanders of the same type as Waikato were to have their gun turret replaced with Exocet missiles, receiving additional Seacat launchers and improved C3. The cost of the later Ikara RN modernisations and the modernisation the Batch 2 RN Leanders often exceeded that of new built Type 21 frigates. The cost of modernisation of the Leanders depended on the hull age, and a nine-year old Leander like Waikato could almost certainly have been rebuilt, with automated 76 mm, CIWS in the mid-1970s, in the pattern of the Dutch Leander modernization at an affordable cost compared with the very costly modernization of a 12-year-old frigate like HMS Dido or HMNZS Wellington.

After re-entering service under the command of Captain Ian Bradley, Waikato was involved in the rescue of a seriously injured fisherman from the Soviet trawler Ardatov during which a Wasp, flown by Lieutenant Joe Tunicliffe, was launched in rough sea conditions to pick up the man from a trawler. On 15 November the ship had left Wellington to visit the Bounty Islands, to the southeast of the South Island, in heavy weather. During the forenoon a Russian fishing vessel well to the south of New Zealand called for assistance for a critically injured seaman and Waikato altered course and increased speed to get within flying range. Several unsuccessful attempts were made to locate the fishing vessel, in appalling weather conditions. The vessel was finally located 60 miles from its reported position the following afternoon and with considerable difficulty the sailor was winched off the ship and taken on board, to be flown to hospital at 3.30 am the next morning. For this incident the pilot, Lieutenant Joe Tunnicliffe received the Air Force Cross and Chief Medical Assistant Bill Filmer, who was winched on board the fishing vessel, received the British Empire Medal for gallantry.

Later, in January 1978, while escorting the United States Navy Sturgeon-class submarine Pintado into Auckland harbour, Waikato faced an armada of anti-nuclear protest yachts, which attempted to block the passage of the possibly nuclear-armed and certainly nuclear-powered submarine. Waikato ran into the harbour ahead of Pintado, with Waikato's Wasp helicopter and another RNZN Wasp in company, deployed over the protest yachts to create downdraft which destabilised the protest yachts, and tipped several over in a controversial move which secured the rapid passage of Pintado to its berth. No one was hurt. While appreciated by the US Navy and crew of the submarine, the move was regarded as aggressive by New Zealand politicians and was condemned by the protesters. The approach was never adopted again. Waikato escorted the nuclear-powered USS Haddo into Auckland harbour with less drama the following February 1979, under the command of Cmdr Ian Hunter in a combined RNZN and Police operation deploying navy patrol craft and the police launch Deodar, but confining use of the intrusive Wasp to transfer of a police inspector to Haddo and clearing the protest armada with only a kayak capsizing. Waikato earlier had deployed to Pearl Harbor for work ups with USN fleet units and performed well in RIMPAC and exercises with the US and Canadian fleet. During these exercises Commander Bradley, positioned Waikato to land a USN Sea King about to be lost with zero fuel. Some crew believed the frigate and its personnel were endangered by landing a large chopper never before tested upon Leanders and the order was officially noted. However, on the last day of the Falklands War a British Leander, Minerva, landed a Sea King helicopter.

During and after the Falklands conflict in 1982–3, Waikato deployed to the Armilla patrol to help free up British ships for deployment. Waikato alternated with HMNZS Canterbury on these duties, the frigates visiting Colombo, Karachi, Mauritius, Zanzibar, Port Sudan, Muscat, Oman and Diego Garcia on what was officially known as the Indian Ocean Patrol.

During July and August 1990, Waikato was involved in Operation BIGTALK, an intervention that was a direct result of the ongoing civil conflict in and around Bougainville. The New Zealand government was tasked with deploying its naval resources to negotiate a peace accord between the two warring factions, the resulting document is now known as the "Endeavour Accord". The ships deployed to this incident were the frigates Waikato and HMNZS Wellington and the supply vessel HMNZS Endeavour. Although the naval forces were not engaged during the operation, due to the intense fighting and civil unrest there was serious potential for insurgent attacks on New Zealand naval forces. Commendations were issued to each member of the crews to acknowledge their contribution. On 23 February 2017, it was announced by NZDF that the New Zealand Operational Service Medal (NZOSM) had been awarded to personnel who were in Bougainville for the Operation BIGTALK peace talks.

== Decommissioning ==
HMNZS Waikato was decommissioned from the Royal New Zealand Navy in 1998 and sold by the government for $1. She was stripped in the Northland port of Opua and sunk off the coast of Tutukaka on 18 December 2000 as an artificial reef. In 2002, the sunken Waikato's bow was separated from the rest of the ship in heavy weather.

== See also ==
- Frigates of the Royal New Zealand Navy
