= Commonwealth Ordnance Services in Malaya and Singapore =

With the adoption of the Singapore strategy in the 1920s as a key cornerstone of Imperial Defence, Singapore and Malaya became the major British bases in the East, not only to defend British possessions in Asia, but also the dominions of Australia and New Zealand, who also contributed a large portion of the construction costs.

Up to the 1920s Malaya and Singapore were seen as benign areas, and as such only a small Ordnance Depot was located on the small Island of Palau Brani in Singapore Harbour. By 1937 a New Base Ordnance Depot and Workshops had been completed in Alexandra, Singapore. In the early 1940s tensions with Japan were rising, so a steady but insufficient reinforcement of Malaya command was undertaken, and by the start of hostilities in December 1941 many units of the Royal Army Ordnance Corps (RAOC), Indian Army Ordnance Corps (IAOC) and Australian Army Ordnance Corps (RAAOC) had been dispatched to the region.

Singapore would capitulate in February 1942 in what was to be the largest loss of manpower, resources and stature in the Empire's history and it would not be until late 1945 the British forces returned. Post war, Britain and other Commonwealth nations retained military forces in the region to fight the communist insurgency, deal with the confrontation with Indonesia and nurture the independence of Malaysia and Singapore until 1989 when the New Zealand forces departed Singapore.

From the beginning of the commitment to the defence of Malaya and Singapore, the RAOC, IAOC, AAOC and the Royal New Zealand Army Ordnance Corps (RNZAOC) were working behind the scenes keeping the forces supplied, and during the 1950s and 60s working with and handing over their responsibility and facilities to their Singaporean and Malaysian counterparts as their nations became self-sufficient.

== Malaya Command 1939 ==
- Headquarters Malaya Command
  - Assistant Director of Ordnance Services - Lieutenant Colonel G.C Evelegh, RAOC (also O.C RAOC)
  - Chief Ordnance Mechanical Engineer - Lieutenant Colonel J.P McLare, M.Sc., M.I.E.E., RAOC
  - Resident Ordnance Unit
    - 14 Section RAOC
  - Ordnance Officers and Warrant Officers
    - Ordnance Officers, 3rd Class
      - Major C.H.E Lowther, MC
    - Ordnance Executive Officers, 2nd Class
      - Captain F.C White
      - Captain J.J Scully
    - Ordnance Officers, 4th Class.
      - Captain C.H McVIttle
      - Captain R.H Finney
    - Ordnance Mechanical Engineers 4th Class
      - Lieutenant D Carmichael, M.Sc.(Eng.),.A.M.I.Mech.E.
      - Lieutenant H Ortliger
      - Lieutenant W.J Whately, A.M.Inst.C.E
    - Ordnance Executive Officers, 3rd Class
      - Lieutenant H.J Bale
    - Armament Branch- Assistant Ordnance Mechanical Engineers
      - Lieutenant H.J Howland
    - Warrant Officers
      - Sub-Conductor J.F Ardell
      - Sub-Conductor E.A.J Mackenzie
      - Sub-Conductor W.E Gale
    - Armaments Articifer Section (Fitters) Section
      - Serjant Major W.C Bliss
    - Armaments Articifer Section (Instrument) Section
      - Serjant Major B Ashworth

== Malaya Command 1940–1942 ==
- Headquarters Malaya Command
  - DDOS Malaya – Brigadier G.C Evelegh
  - DDOS LofC – Colonel C.Hunt, RAOC
- 12 Indian Brigade
  - 3 Mobile Workshop, IAOC
  - 25 Mobile Workshop, IAOC
  - 28 Mobile Workshop, IAOC
  - 36 Mobile Workshop, IAOC
- Indian III Corps
  - ADOS – Colonel W. P. B. Ashton
  - DDOS – Colonel (Acting) William Walter LINNEY, IAOC. May 1941 – February 1942 (Escaped)
  - DDOS (Mechanical Engineering) – Colonel (Acting) Robert Langdon ROPER, A.M.I.Mech.E. April 1941 – 15 February 1942 (Prisoner of War)
  - 9 Indian Division
    - 8 Mobile Workshops, IAOC
    - 9 Mobile Workshops, IAOC
    - 10 Mobile Workshops, IAOC
  - 11 Indian Division
    - 30 Mobile Workshop IAOC
    - 46 Mobile Workshop IAOC
    - 47 Mobile Workshop IAOC
    - 48 Mobile Workshop IAOC
    - "Z" Advanced Ordnance Workshop, RAOC (ZAOD) (1941–1942) at Maxwell Road
  - Advanced Base Ordnance Depot, Kent Halt
  - Advanced Base Ordnance Workshop
  - Advanced Ordnance Depot Kuala Lumpur
  - Advanced Ordnance Depot Penang
  - Advanced Ordnance Depot Valdor
  - Advanced Ammunition Depot Kuala Lumpur
  - Advanced Ammunition Depot Penang and
  - Advanced Ammunition Depot Valdor
- Singapore Fortress
  - ADOS – LTCOL C. H.McVittie, RAOC
  - Base Ordnance Depot, Alexandra
  - Base Ordnance Workshop, Alexandra (1937–1942)
  - Base Ammunition Depot, Alexandra
  - Base Ammunition Depot, Kranji
  - Base Ammunition Depot, Changi
  - Base Ammunition Depot, Nee Soon area
  - Base Ammunition Depot, Bukit Timah rifle range (under command of CAPT D. Lawson AAOC)
  - Base Ammunition Depot, Nee Soon area
- Australian 8th Division
  - DADOS – LTCOL L.R.D. Stahle
  - 8 Division Mobile Bath Unit,
  - 8 Division Salvage Unit,
  - 2/3 Ordnance Stores Coy -OC – MAJ G. McKay
  - 2/10 Ordnance Field Park – OC – CAPT S.S. Woods
  - 2/10 Field Park Workshop – OC – MAJ H. Jarvis
  - 22 Infantry Brigade Workshop – OC – CAPT S. Hawkees
  - 22 Infantry Brigade Ordnance Field Park – OC – CAPT A.T.J. Owen
  - 27 Infantry Brigade Workshop – OC – CAPT Moore
  - 27 Infantry Brigade Ordnance Field Park – OC – CAPT C.F. Young
  - 8 Light Aid Detachments
    - 69 Light Aid Detachment
    - 73 Light Aid Detachment
    - 74 Light Aid Detachment
    - 84 Light Aid Detachment
    - 85 Light Aid Detachment
    - 86 Light Aid Detachment
    - 87 Light Aid Detachment
    - 88 Light Aid Detachment
  - 8 Division Mobile Laundry and forward decontamination Unit – OC – CAPT A.A. Smith, Klaung then Farrar Road, Singapore
  - Ammunition Instruction and Inspection Staff (OC – CAPT D. Lawson).
  - Ordnance Infantry Battalion (Jan–Feb 1942)
    - A Company, AAOC Personnel
    - B Company, AAOC Personnel
    - C Company, AAOC Personnel
    - D Company, RAOC Personnel
    - E Company, Personnel from 8 Div Sigs and AASC
- British 18th Infantry Division
  - ADOS – LTCOL A.T. Hingston
  - 4th Ordnance Stores Company (400 men formed at Deepcut, UK December 1941)
  - 18 Division Ordnance Field Park
  - 18 Division Ordnance Workshops

== Malaya/Malaysia 1945–1972 ==
- Ordnance Depots
  - 221 (Indian) Base Ordnance Depot, Alexandra, Singapore 1945–1946
  - 223 (Indian) Base Ordnance Depot, Alexandra, Singapore 1945–1946
  - 223 Base Ordnance Depot, Alexandra, Singapore 1946–1949
    - 3 Base Ordnance Depot, Alexandria, Singapore 1949–1971
      - HQ, 3 Sub-depot and RSG in Alexandria
      - 1 Sub-depot Kranji
      - 2 Sub-depot (Clothing & General Stores) in Keat Hong
      - 4 Supply Depot, Dover Road formed from remnants of 4 SPRD Mid 1968
  - 30 Battalion, Alexandra, Singapore (Admin by 3BOD) 1949-19?
  - 31 Battalion, Keat Hong, Singapore 1949–1954? absorbed by 30 Battalion
  - Ordnance Depot, Kuala Lumpur Malaya 1945-1947
  - 7 Forward Ordnance Depot, Kuala Lumpur Malaya 1949–1957
  - 5 Advanced Ordnance Depot: 5 Advanced Ordnance Depot (5 AOD) was a short lived RAAOC and RNZAOC combined Depot in Singapore 1970 to 1971.
  - Ordnance Services Singapore
    RAOC residual unit withdrawn in 1975
- Ammunition Depots
  - 443 Base Ammunition Depot, Kranji Singapore 1945–1969
    - Ammo Sub Depot, Blakang Mati island (now Sentosa) 1948–1965
  - 3 BOD Ammo Sub Depot 1969–1971 formed when 443 BAD closed
  - Attap Valley Ammunition Depot
    Formally the Armament Depot of the British Naval Base, the majority of the depot was handed back to the Singapore Government in 1972 by the RAOC, but several Explosive Storehouses (ESH) were retained as the ammunition depot of the RNZAOC NZAOD until 1989.
- Vehicle Depots
  - 221 Vehicle Company 1945–195?9 King George then Park Jurong Road, Singapore, renamed to 221 Base Vehicle Depot
    - 221 Base Vehicle Depot, Tebrau, Johore Bahru, Malaya, 195?- 1969
      - Sub depot at Kranji with Centurion tanks
    - 3 BOD Vehicle Sub Depot 1969–1971, formed when 221 BVD closed
- Ordnance Field Parks
  - 28th Commonwealth Brigade Ordnance Field Park (28 OFP) 1955–1970) Taiping and Ternadak
    28 OFP was a RAOC and RAAOC unit capable of fully mobile operations and level of support required for brigade operations. Most of the vehicles Binned vehicles and wagons, fully equipped and stocked with spares to support the brigade in the field. Stores replenishment was achieved through sustainment runs to 3 BOD Singapore.
  - 35 Independent Infantry Brigade Ordinance Field Park, Kuala Lumpur, Kluang and Muar, Malaya, May 1955 -19?
  - 48 Gurkha Inf Bde Ordnance Field Park, Withdrawn from Malaya, 25 Aug 1950 reinforced with vols from Singapore and renamed 27 Inf Bde OFP
  - 63 Brigade Ordnance Field Park, Kluang, Malaya C1957
  - 3 Commando Brigade Ordnance Field Park, Singapore, Borneo, Singapore Jan 1964 –1974
  - 19 (Airportable) Ordnance Field Park, Singapore/Borneo, Feb 65 – Jan 66
  - 97 Ordnance Maintenance Park Formed at Labuan, Borneo early 1965 by renaming OFP Labuan, Feb 67 relocated to Singapore
  - 98 Ordnance Maintenance Park Formed at Kuching, Borneo Oct 1964 by renaming 98 OFP, moved to Singapore Dec 1966, disbanded Jan 1967
  - 99 Brigade Ordnance Field Park, .
    - Formed in Singapore Dec 1962, moved to Labaun .
    - Renamed OFP Labuan Sept 1963 .
- Supply Depots
  - 1 Supply Depot (Transferred from RASC) Terendak Camp, Malacca, Malaya 1965-19?
  - 2 Supply Depot (Transferred from RASC) Taiping then Kluang, Malaya 1965-19?
  - 3 Supply Depot (Transferred from RASC) Ipho then Malacca, Malaya 1965-19?
  - 4 Supply and Petroleum Reserve Depot (4 SPRD) (Transferred from RASC) Dover Road, Singapore 1965–1968, Navy took over distribution of bulk food and all stocks from 4 SPRD transferred to the Naval Base. The rest of the depot became part of 3 BOD
  - 50 Supply Depot (Transferred from RASC) Labuan, Borneo 1965-19?
  - 55 Supply Depot, Sembawang Naval basin, became ANZUK Supply Depot in 1972
  - 62 Supply Depot (Transferred from RASC) Malaya 1965-19?
  - 70 or 71 Supply Depot (Transferred from RASC) Kuching, Borneo 1965-19?
  - 6 Boat Stores Depot (Transferred from RASC) Singapore, 1965-19?
- Other Ordnance units
  - 21 Air Maintenance Platoon, Kuala Lumpur Malaya 1949–1957
  - FSTS ==Forward Stores Transit Section in Tawau
  - Combat Supplies Platoon, 3 Squadron, RCT, Terandak Camp, Malaysia. 1965–1969

== ANZUK Force 1971–1974 ==
- ANZUK Ordnance Depot
  ANZUK Ordnance Depot was the Ordnance component, manned by service personnel from the RAOC, RAAOC and RNZAOC with locally employed civilians (LEC) performing the basic clerical, warehousing and driving tasks. It was part of the ANZUK Support Group supporting the short lived ANZUK Force in Singapore from August 1971 to September 1974. ANZUK Ordnance Depot was formed from the Australian/NZ 5 AOD and UK 3BOD and consisted of:
  - Stores Sub Depot
  - Vehicle Sub Depot
  - Ammunition Sub Depot
  - Barrack Services Unit
- ANZUK Supply Depot, Note: Although an Army Service Corps unit, RAOC personnel were employed in it.

== New Zealand Forces South East Asia 1974–1989 ==
- New Zealand Advanced Ordnance Depot

From 1974 to 1989 the RNZAOC maintained the New Zealand Advanced Ordnance Depot (NZAOD) in Singapore as part of New Zealand Force South East Asia (NZFORSEA).

- RNZAOC Stores Section, NZ Force Workshops
- RNZAOC Stores Section, 1RNZIR, Light Aid Detachment.

== See also ==
- Royal Army Ordnance Corps
- Royal Australian Army Ordnance Corps
- Royal New Zealand Army Ordnance Corps

== Sources ==
- Bolton, J. S., A History of The Royal New Zealand Army Ordnance Corps (Trentham: The Corps, 1992)
- Ferneyhough, Brigadier A.H, A Short History of the RAOC (1965)
- Steer, Brigadier Frank, To the Warrior his Arms: The Story of the RAOC 1918–1994 (Pen & Sword, 2005)
- Tilbrook, Major John. To The Warrior His Arms: A History of the RAAOC (Royal Australian Army Ordnance Corps Committee, 1989)
