= New Zealand Advanced Ordnance Depot =

- Active: 1974–89
- Country: New Zealand
- Branch: New Zealand Army
- Type: Logistics
- Size: 25 military and 75 civilian staff
- Part of: HQ NZFORSEA
- Garrison/HQ: Singapore

The ANZUK Ordnance Depot was established in 1971 to provide logistical support to Australian, New Zealand and British forces stationed in Singapore and Malaysia as part of ANZUK Force. It was commanded by a Royal Army Ordnance Corps officer of the rank of lieutenant colonel and staffed by Australian, New Zealand and United Kingdom personnel and Locally Employed Civilians. This organisation operated for only a short period. Australia changed Government in 1972 and the incoming Labor Government decided to withdraw Australia’s commitment to the region. This took effect in 1974 and was followed later by the withdrawal of the British forces. It was then decided that New Zealand should form its own Advanced Ordnance Depot, designated the New Zealand Advanced Ordnance Depot (NZAOD). This was the start of a commitment which was to last until December 1989.

== Formation and personnel ==
The NZAOD came into being on 1 October 1974 to support the New Zealand Force which was to remain behind after the withdrawal of Australian and British forces from Singapore. It was a self-contained and independent depot with all the normal Ordnance supply functions. It was the first such depot raised by New Zealand since World War II. Although Australia was leaving the region, at the outset it was planned that the United Kingdom would also remain and as a result there was intense competition between New Zealand and the United Kingdom for stock, locally employed personnel (LECs), plant and materials handling equipment and warehouse accommodation of ANZUK Ordnance Depot. The creation of the two forces developed a working rivalry between the Royal Army Ordnance Corps and the Royal New Zealand Army Ordnance Corps personnel. However, before the first of the NZAOD staff had completed their full tour, the RAOC personnel returned to the United Kingdom following the confirmation of the British withdrawal from Singapore.

The main units NZAOD had to support consisted of headquarters New Zealand Force South East Asia (HQ NZFORSEA) and the 1st Battalion, Royal New Zealand Infantry Regiment (1 RNZIR). In addition, there were a host of supporting units. Initially these had been scattered all over Singapore Island but they were then concentrated in the Sembawang area in the former Royal Navy Singapore Naval Base, leaving 1 RNZIR in Dieppe Barracks located next to Sembawang Airbase.

NZFORSEA undertook a wide range of training exercises, exchanges, formal functions, as well as assistance to the Singapore and Malaysian Armed Forces. There were also New Zealand Government non-military requests such as logistic assistance to trade delegations, the attendance of the band at receptions, support to the local school and a host of sporting engagements. NZAOD support to the force developed over the years and at its peak the strength of the depot was over 100 personnel. This number was made up of approximately 25 military personnel, including a small group of female staff, and more than 75 civilians. The majority of the LECs came direct from service with the British forces, and they brought with them a lot of experience. Only a few hundred civilian employees were required, though, and as a result of the withdrawal of the British and the Australians many thousands of Singaporeans were made redundant.

== Organisation ==
The organisation of the depot was based on a New Zealand Ordnance Depot with a few additions to meet the needs of the force.

- Orderly room
- Internal Audit Section
- Claims
- Local Purchase Cell
  Given its location and long lead times from New Zealand the Local Purchase Cell was responsible for sourcing items from the local Marker
- Provision, Control and Accounts (PC&A)
  The control office was initially equipped with NCR 33 accounting machines, but these wore out and were not replaced as their demise coincided with the planned withdrawal of the force. In 1984, the depot reverted to a manual system of accounting while a stand-alone computer system was developed, which was in turn replaced with the Defence Supply System Retail (DSSR) in July 1987.
- Main Warehouse
  Initially the main warehouse adjacent to the HQ NZFORSEA housed approximately 10,000 lines of general stores including furniture. Stock holdings were based on six months consumption but this varied in some cases where large amounts of stock had been inherited from the 3 BOD, some of which were still in stock in 1989.
- Returned Stores and Disposals Section(RSDS)
  RSDS employed a number of tradesmen: carpenters looked after all the wooden furniture and fittings, rattan workers repaired the cane furniture, a seamstress maintained the curtains and cushion covers, textile refitters repaired tentage and leather goods, and storemen handled the host of unit camp equipment returns. The majority of the staff were civilians with a small number of military personnel in control.
- Direct Support Section (DSS)
  A separate clothing store was established in Dieppe Barracks to meet the needs of the infantry battalion and this two-man section became the clothing store for the entire force.
- Supply Section
  In 1978 when the New Zealand Army rationalised the supply services in line with the British 1964 McLeod Report, NZAOD inherited the following functions from the Royal New Zealand Army Service Corps:
  - ration platoon cold stores,
  - two static POL points,
  - the responsibility for field supply of rations and POL to all force activities, including the refuelling of helicopters.
    The supply of rations in Singapore was a challenging and varied task. Local contractors supplied the cold stores with fresh rations every day.
    To provide more variety and to supplement the standard issue ration packs, local items such as rice, noodles, tinned fruit and drinks were purchased and packaged into a local ration pack, known as the "Gerber Pack" which was made up specifically for tropical conditions.
    As they were in the Naval Base, the cold stores situated alongside the wharfs was used by allied navies when passing through Singapore, and NZAOD was frequently requested to assist in the supply of foodstuffs to the visiting warships. This became quite a task when the Falklands fleet was coming home and New Zealand warships were coming and going from the Indian Ocean. NZAOD also assisted the British Army on occasions when the troops from the Hong Kong garrison came to Malaysia for training. It was at such times that the Gurkha troops would arrive and live goats would be requested for consumption.
- Vehicle Group
  There was also a vehicle pool of a few RL Bedford trucks and land rovers for the maintenance of the force, but this was very small and the vehicle section only required three staff. There was a POL point at the Naval Base and another at Dieppe Barracks. While on exercises, refueling was achieved by converting an RL Bedford truck into a makeshift UBRE by loading it with 44 gallon drums or with an aluminium tank and pump unit. Aircraft were also refuelled by 44 gallon drums being manhandled at the landing zones.
- Accommodation Services
  In the latter stages of the life of NZAOD it took on the responsibility for barrack services. This was a departure from the norm for an RNZAOC unit as the married quarters in New Zealand were not furnished at the time. Barrack Services organised the replacement of household items that had been damaged or worn-out in the married quarters. There were over 330 fully furnished married quarters in Singapore when NZAOD took over the responsibility in 1984.
- Ammunition Section
  Ammunition supply was extremely difficult. Singapore is a densely populated island, smaller in size than Lake Taupo. The safety regulations which applied in New Zealand, had to be adjusted in Singapore, or restrictions would have made it impossible to operate. NZAOD occupied three ammunition warehouses in the nearby Singaporean Ammunition depot located at Attap Valley which was an ideal arrangement. A separate RNZAOC Stores Section was attached to the Force Workshops for the supply of technical spares. This unit had two military staff and at one time four civilians.
- NZ Force Quartermaster Store (Q Store)
  The NZ Force Q Store was responsible for providing first line support to HQ NZFORSEA and sub units.

== Operations ==
Although the size of the NZAOD remained small, the Force HQ also conducted many training exercises at various levels and supplied manpower assistance to fill enemy party positions and provide umpires, logistic backup in refuelling or rationing, and staff appointments for Command Post exercises.

== Withdrawal ==
As part of Operation Kupe, the withdrawal of New Zealand forces from Singapore in 1989, and the NZAOD was disbanded.

== Officers Commanding NZAOD ==
Rank	Name	Start date	Finish Date
Major	T.D McBeth	1 October 1974	23 April 1976
Major	R.L Cross	24 April 1976	16 May 1978
Major	C.M Corkin	17 May 1978	15 May 1980
Major	P.Te.T Puohataua	16 May 1980	20 May 1982
Major	J.S Bolton	21 May 1982	10 May 1984
Major	B.L Crafts	11 May 1984	21 August 1986
Major	I.J Juno	26 August 1986	25 May 1988
Major	D.H Watmuff	26 May 1986	10 December 1989

== Dress Distinctions ==
NZ Army personnel posted to NZAOD wore the following dress distinctions:

- NZ Flash – NZ Flash was affixed to each shoulder epaulette.

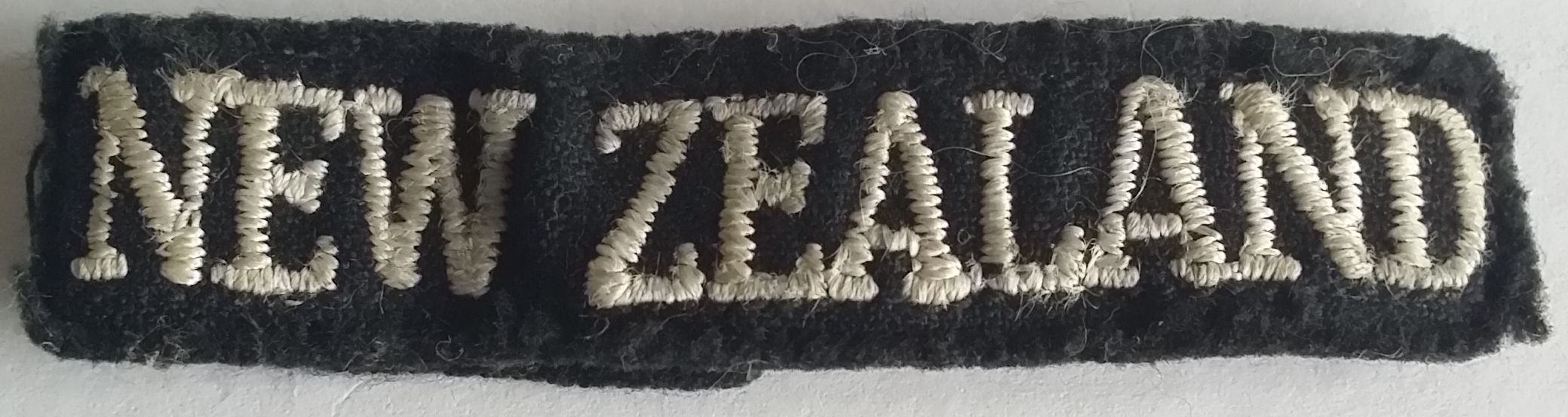
NZ epaulette flash

- Kiwis – Kiwi patch on each shoulder, (1 RNZIR personnel who only wore the Kiwi patch on the right shoulder).
- Garter Tabs – Also known as "woodchucks" Garter Tabs were worn with uniform shorts with the practical use of holding up knee high socks. Garter tabs also served the additional use of identifying the unit that the wearer belonged to. RNZAOC Garter Tabs were blue and Red.

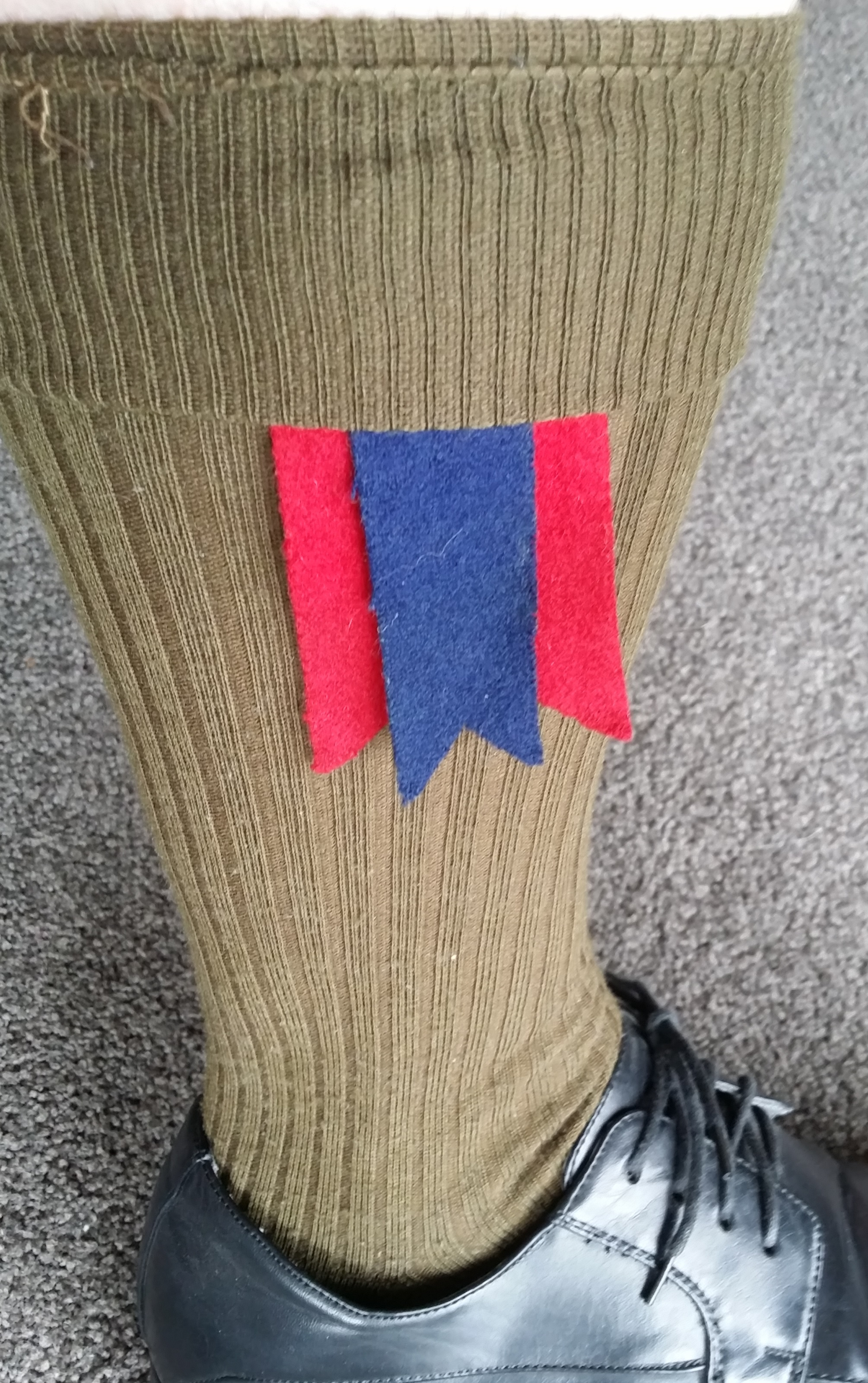
RNZAOC Garter tabs

== DOAZN Club ==
Established during Major Cross's tenure as officer commanding, the DOAZN Club was established in vacant area of the NZAOD warehouse as the focal point for all NZAOD social activities. the Club not only catered for the military staff but also for the LEC members of NZAOD Over the years the club hosted RNZAOC Corps day, Christmas and Waitangi day functions, hosted regular and impromptu happy hours and as the NZAOD was a multi ethnic workplace many function to celebrate all of the local holidays and festivals.

== Billy Beck Club ==
Unlike other RNZAOC units a Henry Tucker Club did not exist, as NZAOD was over the water and there was no real affiliation with the first colonial Storekeeper. As Billy Beck was the first New Zealand Ordnance soldier to set foot on a foreign land operationally, his name was chosen for the Club for all RNZAOC military members posted to Singapore.

== See also ==
- Military history of New Zealand in Malaysia
- 5 Advanced Ordnance Depot
- 28th Commonwealth Infantry Brigade Group
- Commonwealth Ordnance Services in Malaya and Singapore
