= New Zealand Transport Squadron =

E Platoon, 10 Transport Company, RNZASC New Zealand Transport Squadron RNZCT
- Active: 1974–89
- Disbanded: 1989
- Country: New Zealand
- Branch: New Zealand Army
- Type: Logistics
- Role: Provision of Catering, Movements, Transport and Postal services to NZFORSEA
- Garrison/HQ: Singapore

The ANZUK Support Group was established in 1971 to provide Transport and Supply services to Australian, New Zealand and British forces stationed in Singapore and Malaysia as part of ANZUK Force. It was commanded by a Royal Australian Army Service Corps officer and staffed by Australian, New Zealand, United Kingdom personnel and Locally Employed Civilians (LECs). This organisation operated for only a short period. Australia changed Government in 1972 and the incoming Labor Government decided to withdraw Australia’s commitment to the region. This took effect in 1974 and was followed later by the withdrawal of the British forces. It was then decided that New Zealand should form its own Transport Company, designated the New Zealand Transport Company. This was the start of a commitment which was to last until December 1989.

== Formation ==
The NZ Transport Squadron came into being to support the New Zealand Force South East Asia which was to remain in Singapore post the British and Australian withdrawal. In April 1974 E Platoon, 10 Transport Company, RNZASC was formed at Dieppe Barracks as a self-contained and independent Squadron which included:

- Headquarters
- General Service(GS) Transport Platoon
- Coach Platoon
- Base Transport Platoon
- Supply Platoon
- Light Aid Detachment (LAD)

In October 1974 the Company moved from Dieppe Barracks and unofficially changed its name to 18(NZ)Transport Company, this was a tribute to a RNZASC tank transporter company that served in World War II, and the name was frowned upon by the staff in wellington, who insisted that it be referred to as The NZ Transport Company, This would take some time to happen.

Because of the Company's proximity to the NZ Workshop, the LAD was disbanded in 1976.

In 1978 the Coach and Base Transport Platoons were Amalgamated to become the Base Transport Troop.

The New Zealand Army rationalised the supply services in 1979, in line with the 1964 British McLeod Report so that:

- The Supply Platoon was transferred to the New Zealand Advanced Ordnance Depot (NZAOD) and its Military personnel re-badged as Royal New Zealand Army Ordnance Corps soldiers:
- The RNZASC was disbanded and the Royal New Zealand Corps of Transport (RNZCT) came into being. As part of the changes the Company's name officially became New Zealand Transport Squadron RNZCT.

on 1 April 1984 the unit expanded to include;

- New Zealand Force Post Office 5 (NZFPO 5)
- Defence Travel Centre (DTC)
- Woodlands Base Section
  - Khatib Officers Mess
  - Woodlands Warrant Officers and Senior Non Commissioned Officers Mess (WOs & SNCO Mess)
  - Junior Ranks Club
  - Mayflower Club
  - NZ Force Transit Centre (Fernleaf Club)

== Organisation ==
The organisation of the Squadron in 1988–89 was based on a New Zealand Transport Squadron with a few additions to meet the needs of the force.

- Orderly room
- Movement Control Unit
  - Defence Travel Centre
  - Defence Freight Office
- The Fernleaf Centre
- Khatib Officers Mess
- Woodlands WOs & SNCO Mess
- NZFPO 5
- GS Troop
  - 1 Section
  - 2 Section
  - 3 Section
- Base Transport Troop

== Fleet ==
The New Zealand Transport Squadron fleet consisted of:

- Series 2, 2A and 3 Land-rover
- Bedford RL trucks
- Bedford SB3 FV3198 Buses (White Elephants)

== Operations and Daily Tasks ==
Although small, the Squadron was consistently engaged supporting NZFORSEA. Responsibilities included road transport support to 1 RNZIR, operating a large mixed fleet for unit and community needs (including a school bus service), running the Defence Travel Centre and the Defence Freight Office, and providing movement control. Personnel were trained in aerial despatch and recovery, working with No. 41 Squadron’s Bristol Freighters and Iroquois helicopters. Locally Employed Civilians were integral to operations, particularly as drivers and in support roles.

Contemporary reporting also highlights the unit’s role in provisioning: New Zealand‑sourced chilled and frozen foods supplied to NZ personnel, responsiveness to regional supply disruptions, and support to visiting ships and remaining allied contingents in Singapore. The fleet—centred on 1960s‑vintage Bedfords—may have looked dated beside local modern commercial vehicles, yet it was well maintained and reliable. The unit ran defensive driving courses for local authorities, operated a small car‑hire fleet for NZ personnel, and managed cold‑store operations within the former British Naval Base complex (including deep‑freeze handling under challenging conditions).

== Withdrawal ==
As part of Operation Kupe, the withdrawal of New Zealand forces from Singapore in 1989, and the NZ Transport Squadron was disbanded.
