= 655th Engineer Topographic Battalion =

U.S. Army technical support unit

The 655th Engineer Topographic Battalion (655th ENGR TOPO BN) was a technical support unit formed to provide surveying, drafting, and map production activities for the US Army during World War II. With the beginning of the war in Europe, the U.S. realized that the existing European maps were inadequate for tactical purposes or use by artillery units, since existing map grids were inconsistent and did not match up between countries. The Engineer Topographic Battalion's wartime mission was the development of accurate 4-color topographic maps created through timely survey work, drafting, printing, and distribution of military maps as required by the Allied Armed Forces of the United States. The Battalion was first formed in December 1943 and deactivated in December 1946.

== Formation ==
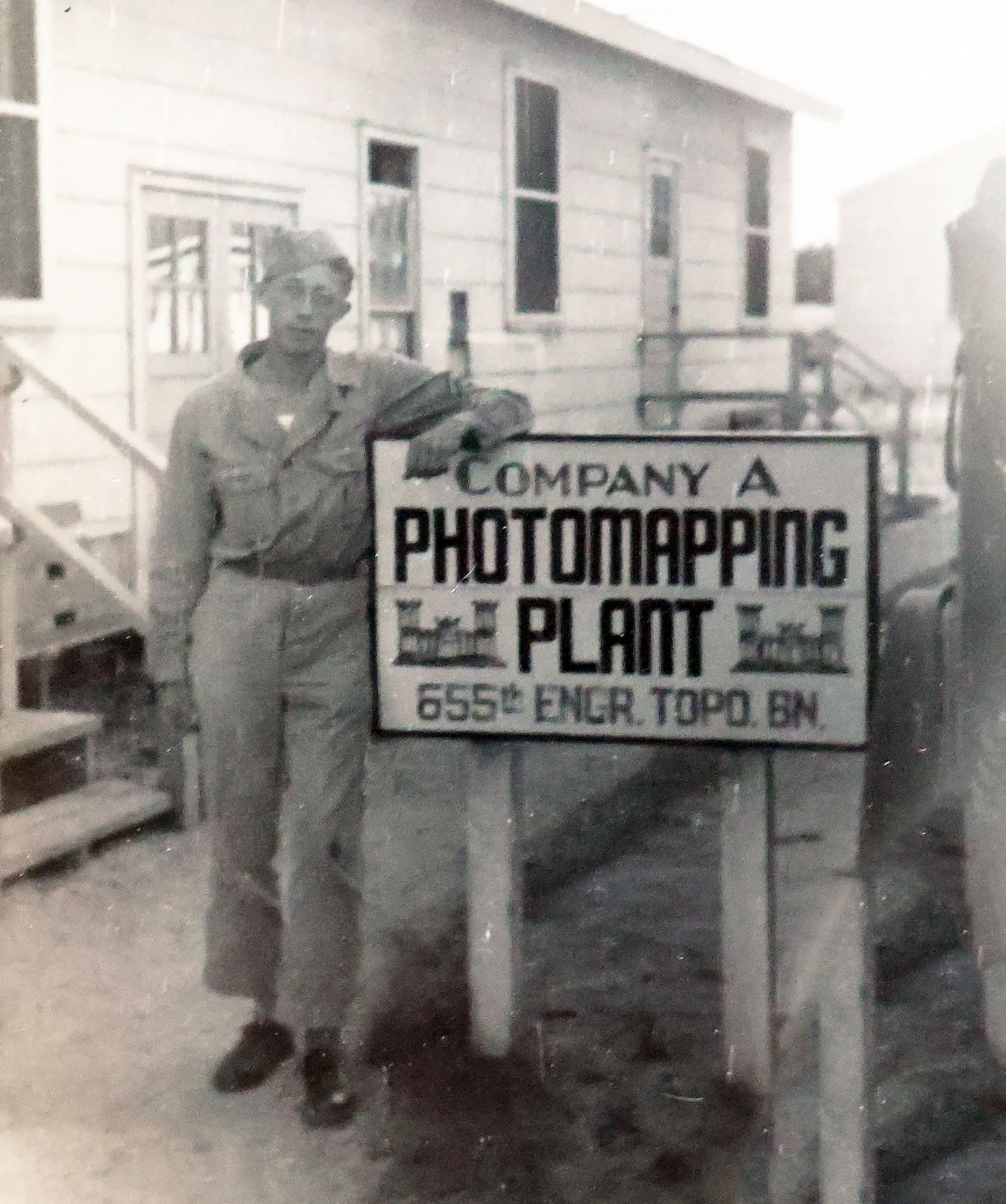
PFC Merle W. Smith, Company A, 655th Engineer Topographic Battalion, standing outside the Photomapping Plant at Camp McCoy, May, 1944

The 655th Engineer Topographic Battalion was activated at Fort McCoy, Wisconsin on December 17, 1943, as a technical unit for mapping and map reproduction activities, with the original squad consisting of 28 men and 1 officer transferred from the 650th Engineer Topographical Battalion, and 5 other officers drawn from other units. The Battalion was formed from personnel who had gone through the Army Specialized Training Program with experience in topographical survey and mapping processes and photomapping and reproduction techniques, and was rounded out with civilian trained personnel with the desired qualifications. The Unit was initially assigned to the Second Army and subsequently attached to the 17th Detachment Special Troops. Major John E. Unverferth assumed command of the unit on January 2, 1944. The first substantial gain in personnel occurred with the arrival of Company "A" of the 30th Engineer Topographic Battalion, who for the past three years had been training in topographic surveying and mapping work of North and South Carolina. Along with additions of other support staff, the battalion eventually grew to approximately 450 men as the gaps in personnel were filled in. On March 31, 1944, the 655th furnished cadres for the formation of the 598th, 599th, 656th and the 657th Engineer Topographic Battalions. At the same time, the 655th received 104 new recruits to refill its ranks.

Basic training included demolition, chemical warfare, and marksmanship drills, but also included conducting troop experiments on newly released GI winter clothing during the winter. After undergoing their winter training in Wisconsin, the Battalion then transferred via troop train to Camp Livingston, Louisiana, arriving July 26, 1944. There, the battalion received summer training including additional weapons practice and combat maneuvers, as well as training in the preparation of Planimetric maps using photographic and control data, based on aerial photos as reference. On August 22, 1944, the 655th Engineer Battalion was reorganized under T/O & E5-55 Engineer Topographic Battalion (Army), with three companies consisting of Headquarters and Services, Company A (Photomapping), and Company B (Reproduction). The Battalion now had an organizational strength of 19 officers, 3 Warrant Officers, and 423 enlisted men.

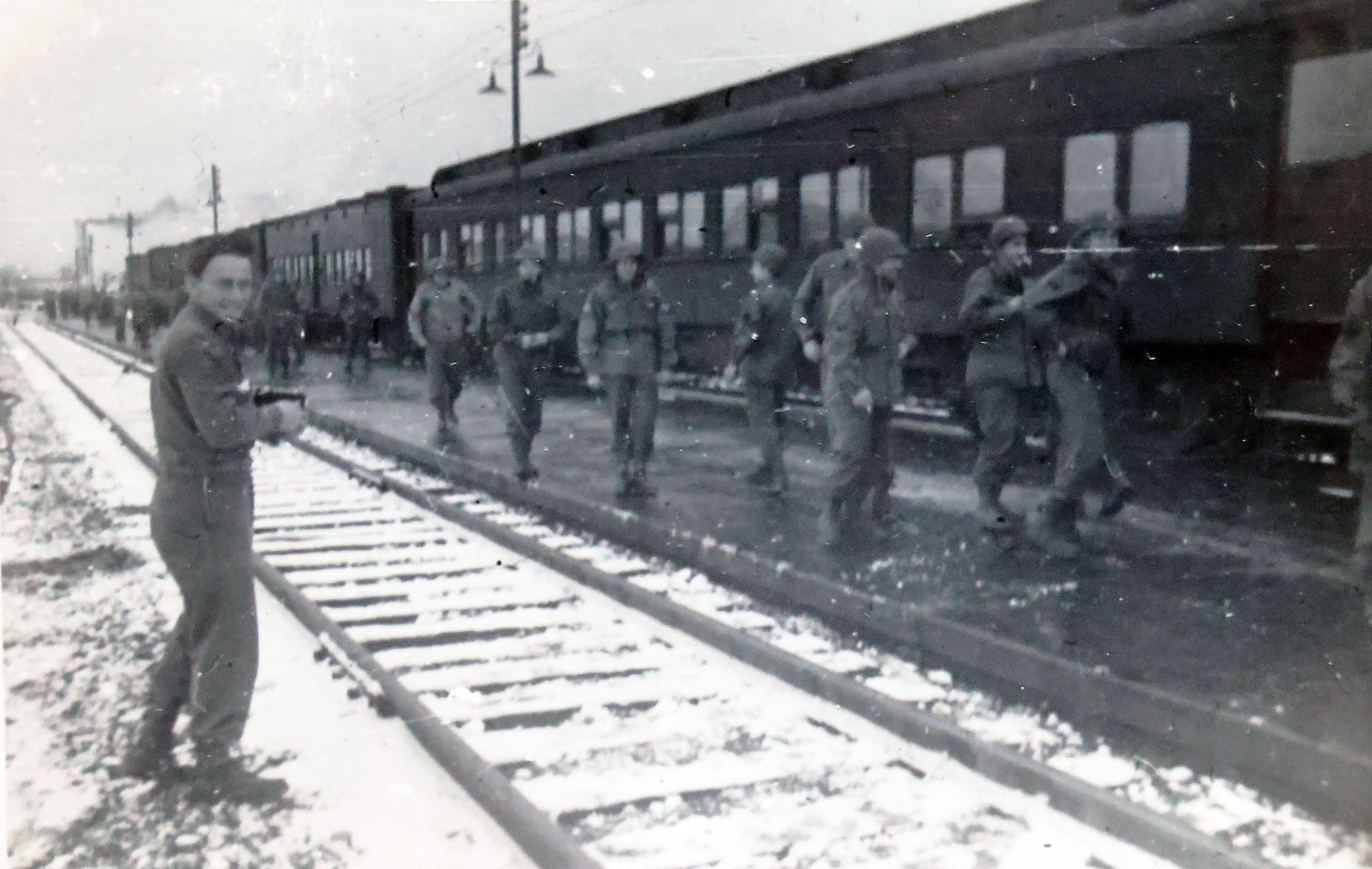
655th ENGR TOPO BN troops taking a short break on the way to Camp Shanks, N.Y. November, 1944.

On November 28, 1944, the Battalion departed by troop train for Camp Shanks, New York for deployment. During the short stay there, 12-hour passes to New York were granted to the personnel for their last chance to see friends and family for many months.

== Deployment ==
On December 8, 1944, the Battalion traveled to the New York City Port of Embarkation and boarded HMT Esperance Bay, an English ship that had been converted into a troop carrier. The convoy did not reach full convoy strength until more ships joined the group off the coast of Nova Scotia, which made the convoy number twenty-two ships and six escorts for the crossing of the Atlantic.

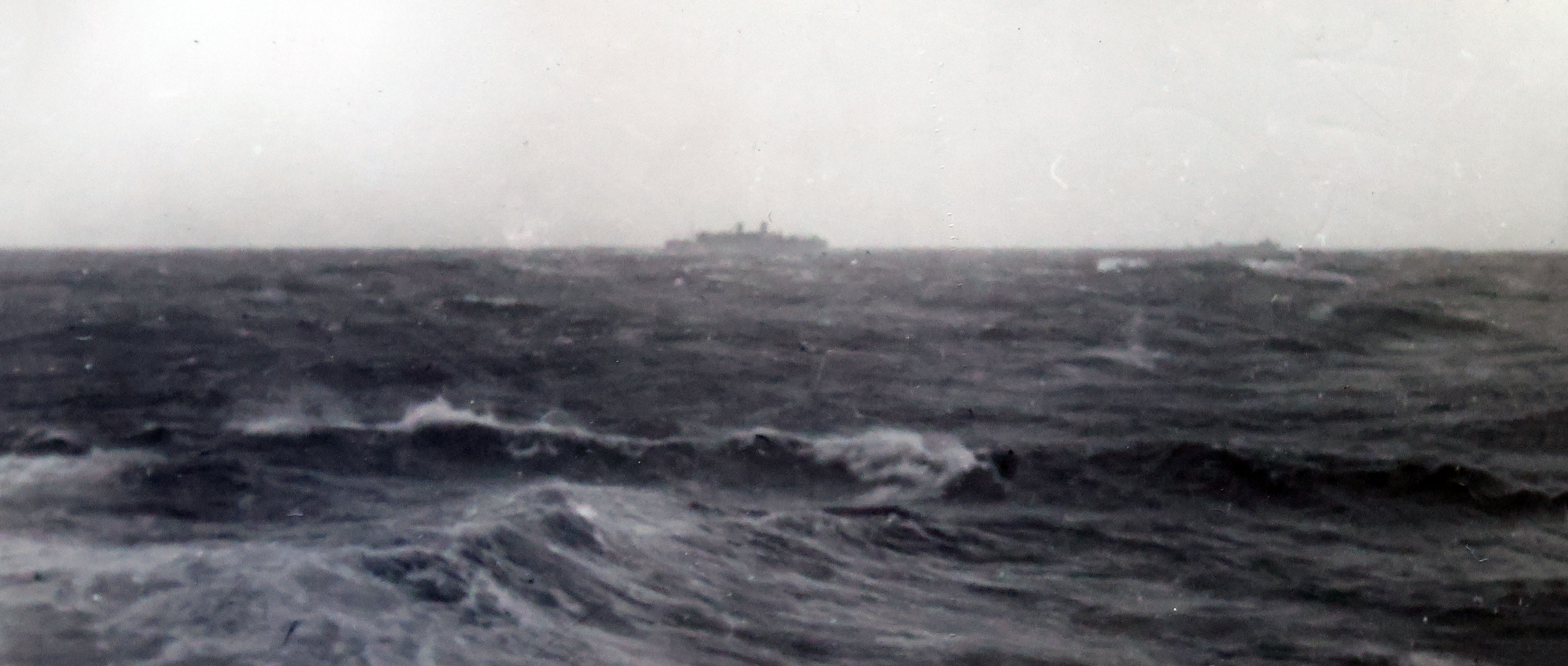
View from Esperance Bay, 655th ENGR TOPO BN troop ship, while in convoy crossing the Atlantic, December 1944

The trip went uneventful until when just off the Coast of Wales when a "Sub Alert" was sounded. Signal whistles beeped and the ships reformed quickly into their prearranged battle formation. There were three other troopships in the convoy. The large clean grey one took the position on the right of Esperance Bay, another fell in more closely to its left and the other one which also carried the Convoy Commander assumed the lead just in front of the ship. A zig-zag, quickly changing course, was taken and two escort destroyers closed in from the front and rear and cut back and forth through the convoy. There were a few ash cans dropped and a bit of gunfire in the distance. One sub was rumored as sunk, but no one saw it nor knew where the rumor originated.

Two weeks later it landed in Avonmouth, England, and the troops then went by troop train and truck to their new camp at Nine Yews, Cranborne, East Dorset, England, arriving on December 22, 1944. Their first task was to reassemble the printing and drafting equipment and prepare their supplies for relocation to the Theater of Operations.

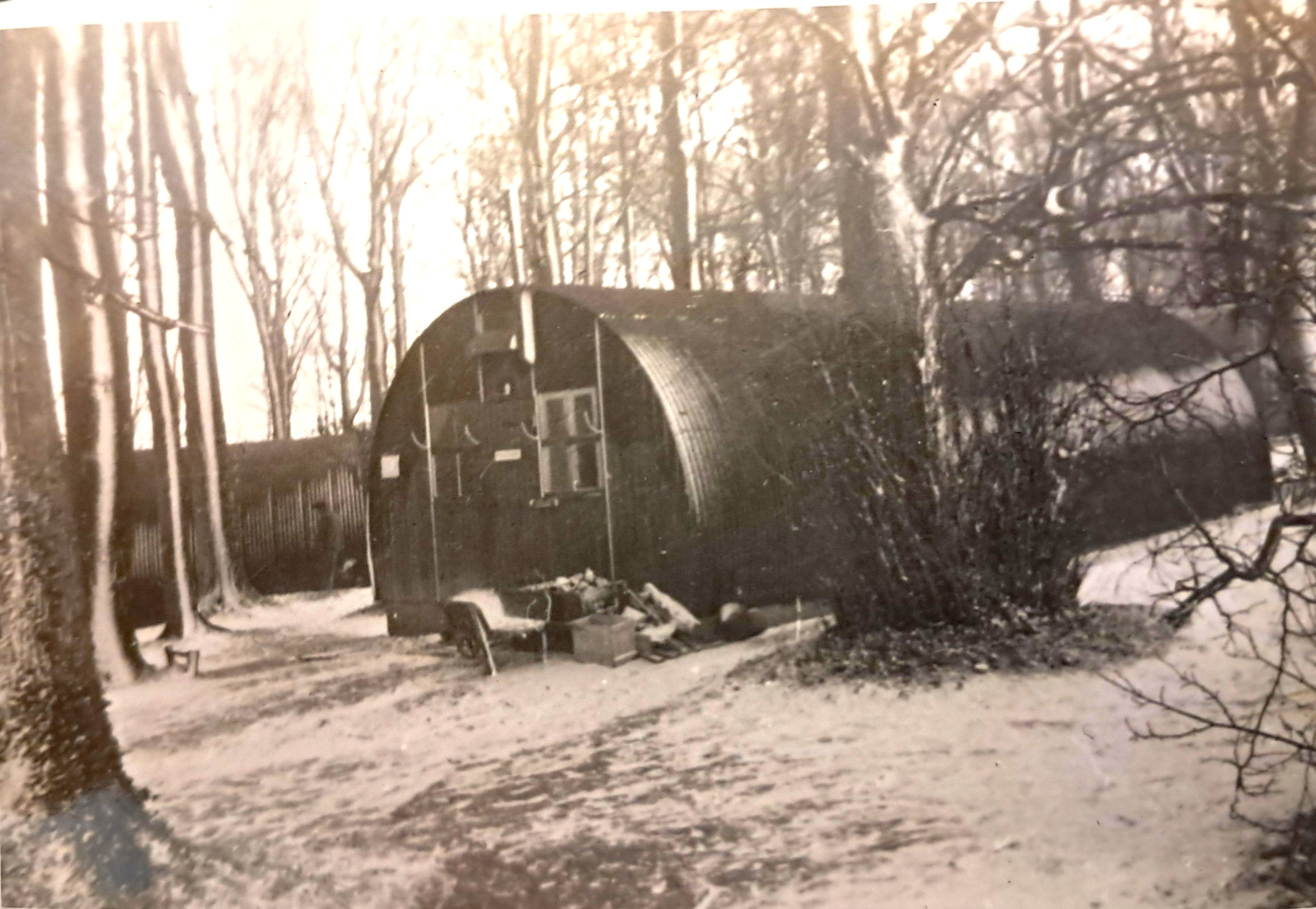
655th ENGR TOPO BN troop quarters in Nissen Huts at Nine Yews, England, December, 1944

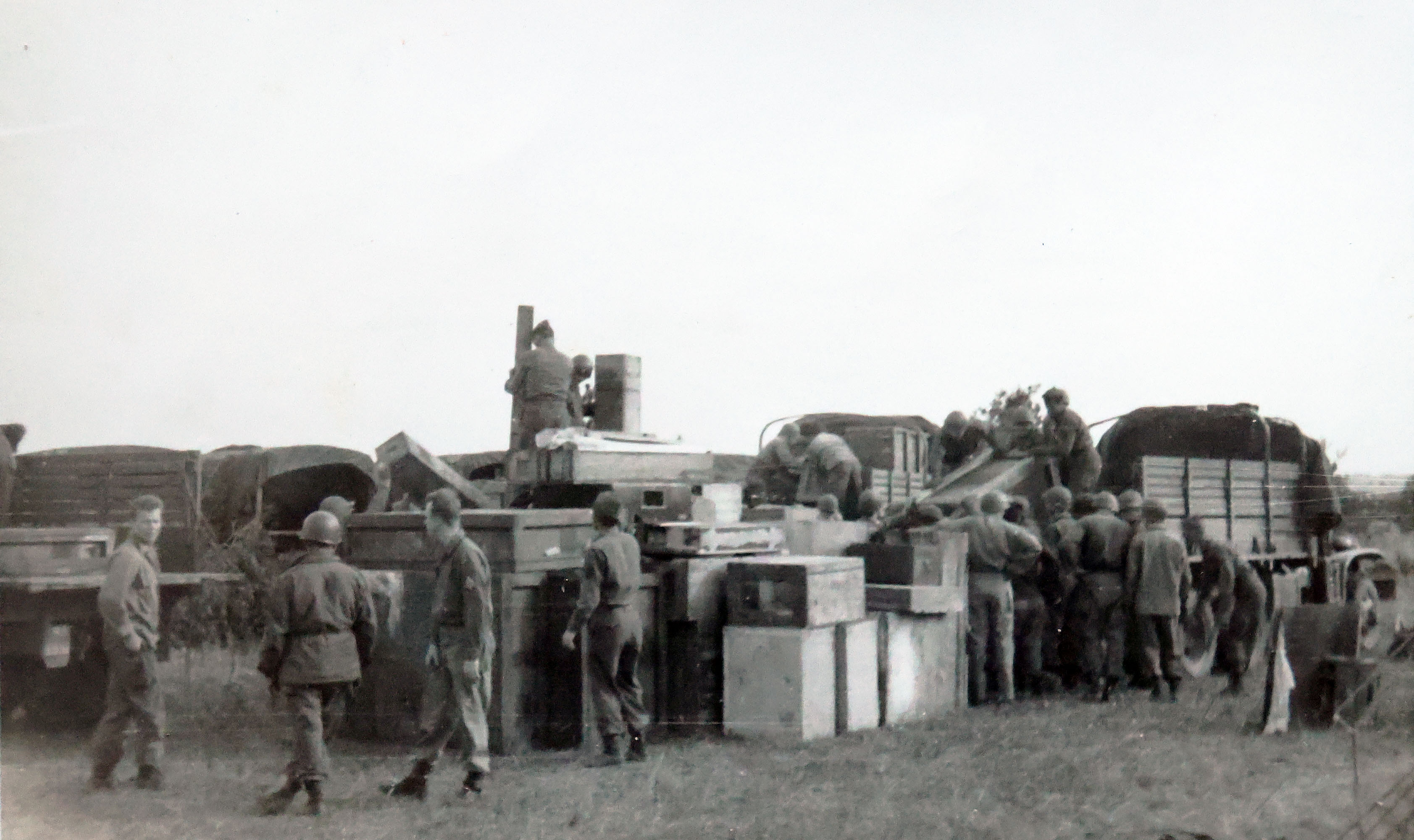
Soldiers of the 655th ENGR TOPO BN at Nine Yews, packing for the move into the Theatre of Operations, December 1944.

Their first task was to reassemble the printing and drafting equipment and prepare their supplies for relocation to the Theater of Operations. Everything was rechecked as it arrived at Nine Yews and was re-crated and packed where necessary.

On January 28, 1945, the Battalion traveled to Camp Hursley, Southampton, England in anticipation of their next move. On January 30, 1945, the Battalion Personnel arrived by motor transport at the Southampton Port of Embarkation and loaded onto the New Zealand Transport ship HMNZS Monowai for the Channel crossing. After landing in Le Havre, France, they were transported by trucks to Camp Twenty Grand (one of the "Cigarette" Camps) where they readied their equipment for rail shipment and awaited their assignment.

On February 8, 1945, the Battalion crowded into Forty and eights box cars for a 4-day rail trip to Visé, Belgium. From there, the Battalion Command Post and Headquarters and Service Company set up in a chateau in Altembrouck, Belgium, while Companies A and B proceeded to Castle Mheer in Mheer, Holland. The drawing and printing work of the 655th needed to be done out of the elements, so locations were required to contain a suitable indoor space to work. Map Storage and Distribution moved to Maastricht, Holland to be near the Ninth United States Army Headquarters (to which the battalion was currently assigned).

== Theater of operations ==
As soon as the equipment was operational in Castle Mheer, the 655th began producing 4-color maps for the Ninth US Army headquarters. Working from aerial photographs and ground survey information, topography maps would be drawn up and printed showing waterways, roads, buildings, and enemy locations. Over 3,000,000 impressions rolled off the presses during the first month. This quick response was possible because the presses and the large format cameras were installed on trucks that only needed to be leveled and connected to portable generators to be made functional.

On March 1, 1945, as the Ninth Army participated in pushing the Germans back across the Rhine, the 655th was ordered to move forward to Hoensbroek, Holland, with Map Storage and Distribution remaining in Maastricht, Holland. Then over the next two weeks, as the Allies again pushed forward, the 655th advanced to Mönchengladbach, Germany.

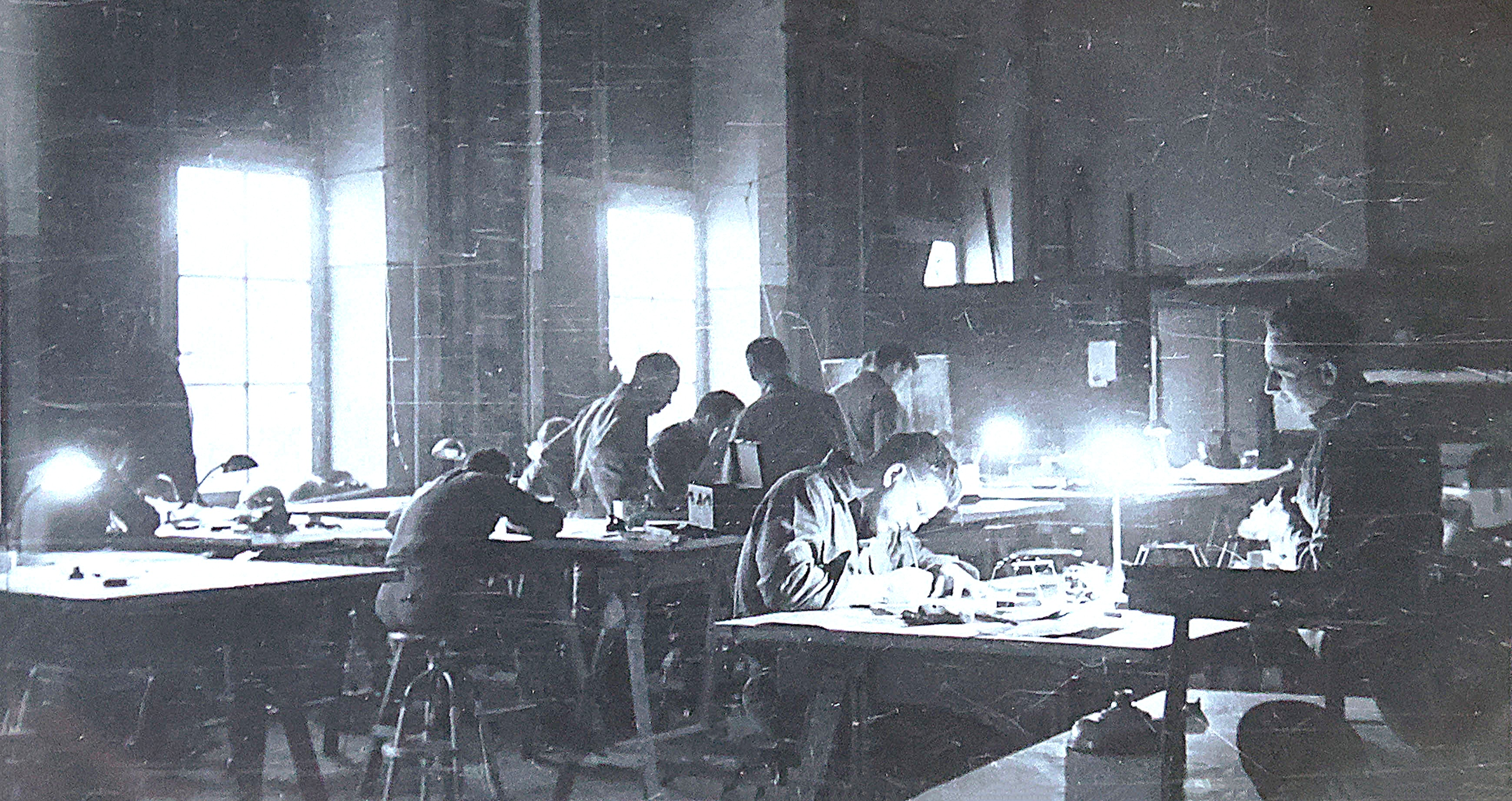
655th ENGR TOPO BN preparing maps in the Schwartz & Klein textile factory, Muchen – Gladbach, Germany, March, 1945

On the tenth of March, Map Storage and Distribution moved from Maastricht to Munchen-Gladbach, Germany, across the Rhine from Dusseldorf. On the eleventh, twelfth and fourteenth Headquarters and Service Company, Company A and Company B followed in the Company groups in that order. Munchen-Gladbach was mostly in ruins except for a small section on the outskirts of the town where the Battalion stopped to occupy and set up operations in a hastily deserted textile factory, bearing the name of Schwartz & Klein.

During the month of March 1945, the Battalion furnished survey teams to work with the 145th Engineer Combat Group on the Venlo Bridge site, survey work in the vicinity of Julich to locate German anti-tank gun emplacements, and survey work with the 1143rd Engineer Combat Group on the Rhine River Wesel Railway Bridge building job, and other areas. Staying close to the Ninth Army Headquarters in early April 1945, the Battalion again relocated and set up operations in the Bielefield, Germany Langemark Kaserne Camp. In mid-April 1945 they moved forward again to the Siegfried Kaserne in Braunschweig, Germany. From that location the survey and mapmaking work continued, including the job of making quadrangle maps of the surrounding areas.

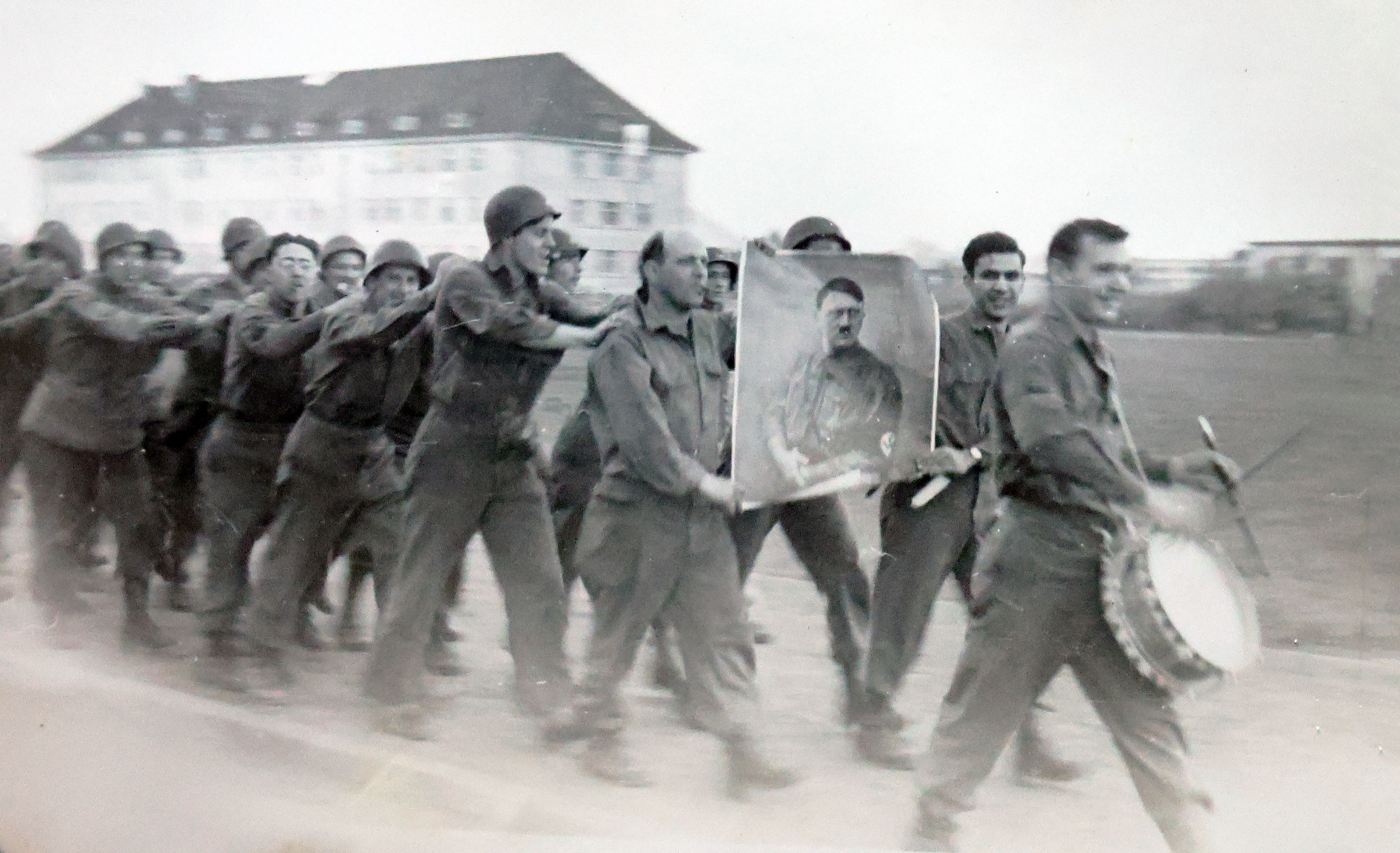
655TH ENGR TOPO BN soldiers celebrating upcoming VE Day, Braunschweig, Germany, May 7, 1944

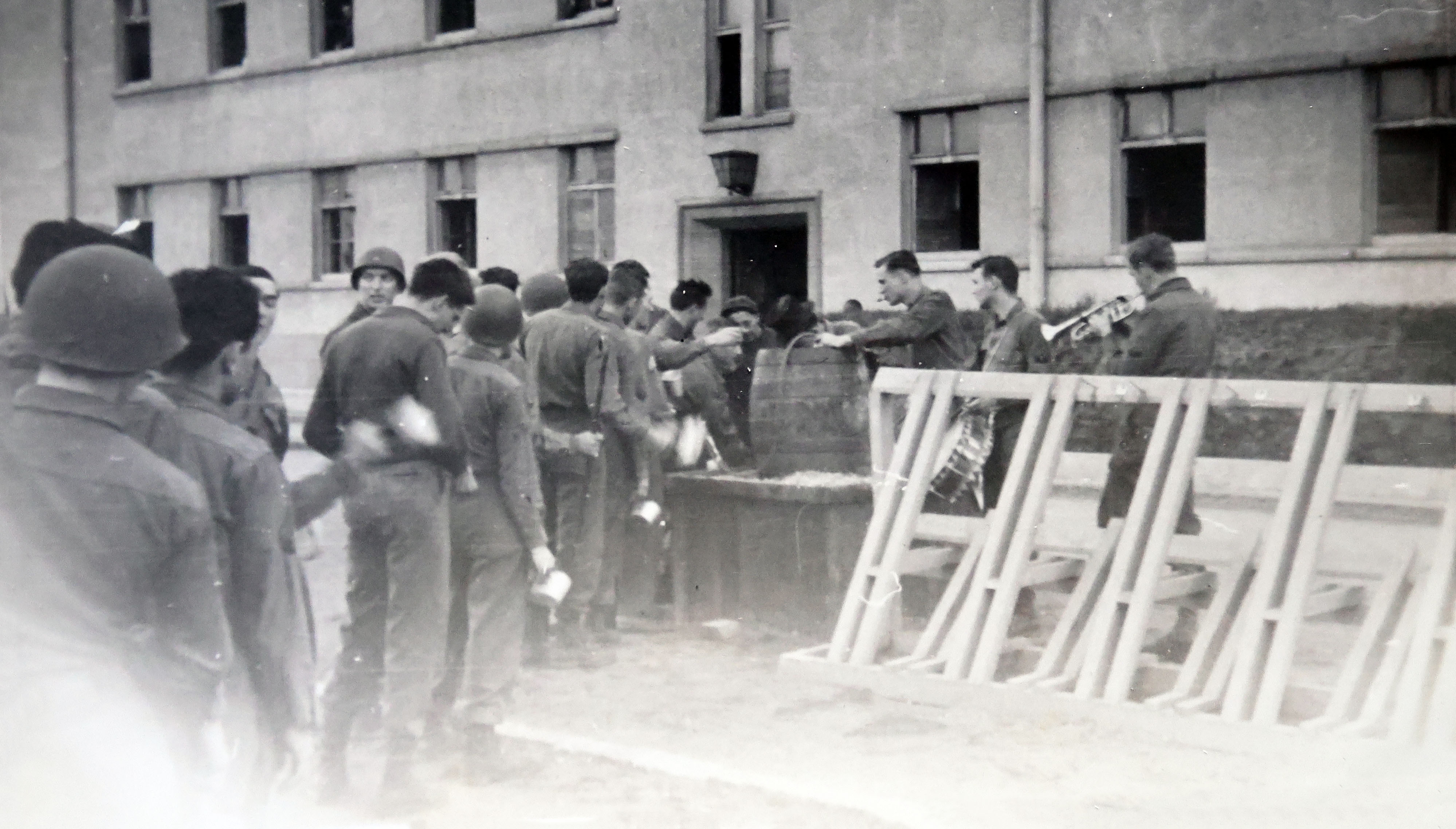
655TH ENGR TOPO BN soldiers celebrating VE day with Beer, Braunschweig, Germany, May 7, 1944

On the morning of the May 7th, a battalion formation was scheduled for the afternoon. Barrels of German beer were rolled out onto the big parade grounds and everyone gathered around with canteen cups in hand. Lt Branen called the noisy group to "At Ease" and Colonel Unverferth happily announced the official surrender of Germany, reassured the men that there was "Plenty Beer" and tomorrow was officially Proclaimed VE-Day and a "Holiday". A parade began to form, headed by a large picture of Hitler.

== Post VE Day activities ==
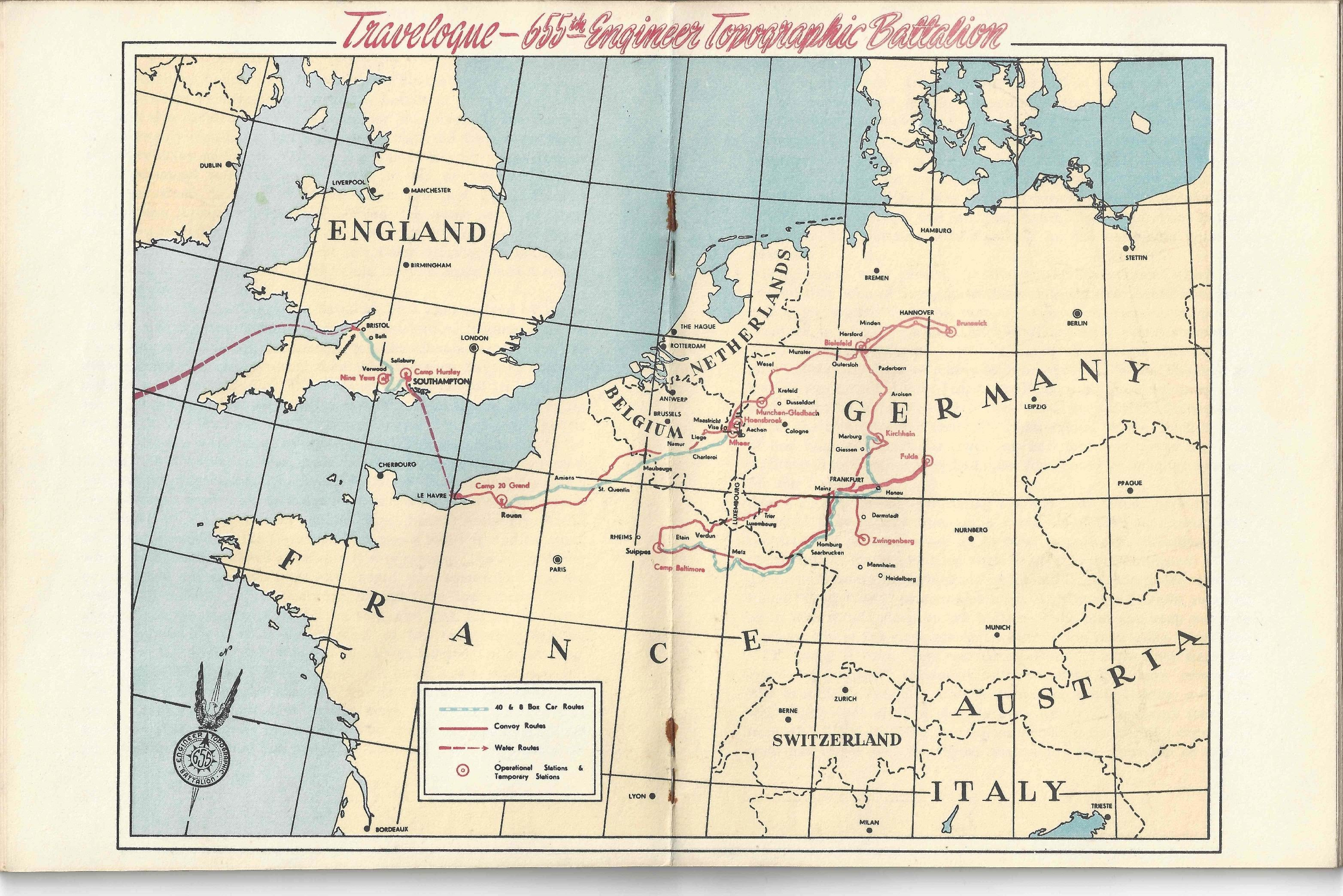
Map showing the movements of the 655th Engineer Topographic Battalion during WWII.

Surveying and map production in connection with the Occupation of Germany continued after the end of World War II in Europe (VE Day).

On May 18, 1945, while in the vicinity of Bremen, Germany one of the survey party's vehicles hit a concealed mine wounding four men, the first casualties of the unit. As the American Zone was established, the unit relocated to it in Kirchhain, Germany, while surveying work continued.

On June 15, 1945, as the Battalion began preparing for redeployment to the Pacific Theater, control for the 655th moved from the Ninth US Army to the Seventh Army. On June 25, 1945, the Battalion traveled again by train in "Forty and Eights" boxcars, and arrived in Camp Baltimore, near Suippes, France on June 28, 1945. Upon arrival, the Battalion was relieved of Seventh US Army control and assigned to Assembly Area Command.

On July 10, 1945, the unit prepared and dispatched the press trucks and photo making equipment to the Marseilles Port for disembarkation to the Pacific, and the personnel were at readiness for embarkation to the Pacific by August 20, 1945. The troops began orientation on Japan and Japanese Tactics.

On August 5, 1945, the unit organizational equipment, except for what was to accompany the troops on board ship, was loaded on trains in Suippes, France for shipment to the staging area in Arles, France.

== Postwar activities ==
The sudden end of the war in the Pacific brought a halt to the Battalion's embarkation. The Battalion remained in the Camp Baltimore Assembly Area for several months while its planned deployment continued to change. Originally the unit expected to be redeployed directly to the Pacific, then it was planned for the unit to be transferred to the States and then redeployed to the Pacific, and finally it was decided that the unit would remain as occupational troops. On October 6, 1945, GIs with 45 VE Day points or more were moved towards discharge, while those with fewer points were subject to transfer to service as occupational personnel. Passes to Paris and other areas were freely given to the occupational personnel while they awaited further orders.

As the Battalion shifted to its occupational force role, its control was transferred to the Third Army. On October 10, 1945, the unit moved to Fulda, Germany. Its new function focused on producing maps of Berlin and other towns, with greater detail on places, names, and coordinates. Because most of its original mapmaking and printing equipment had been shipped out, replacement press and photographic equipment had to be re-requisitioned and reinstalled.

By January 1, 1946, a printing plant had been established in Zwingenberg, Germany and was in full operation. However, by the end of March the survey platoon was reallocated elsewhere due to the lack of local survey projects, and as the redeployment of troops in Europe continued, most of the technically qualified men were being redeployed or demobilized and their replacements were without the appropriate skills.

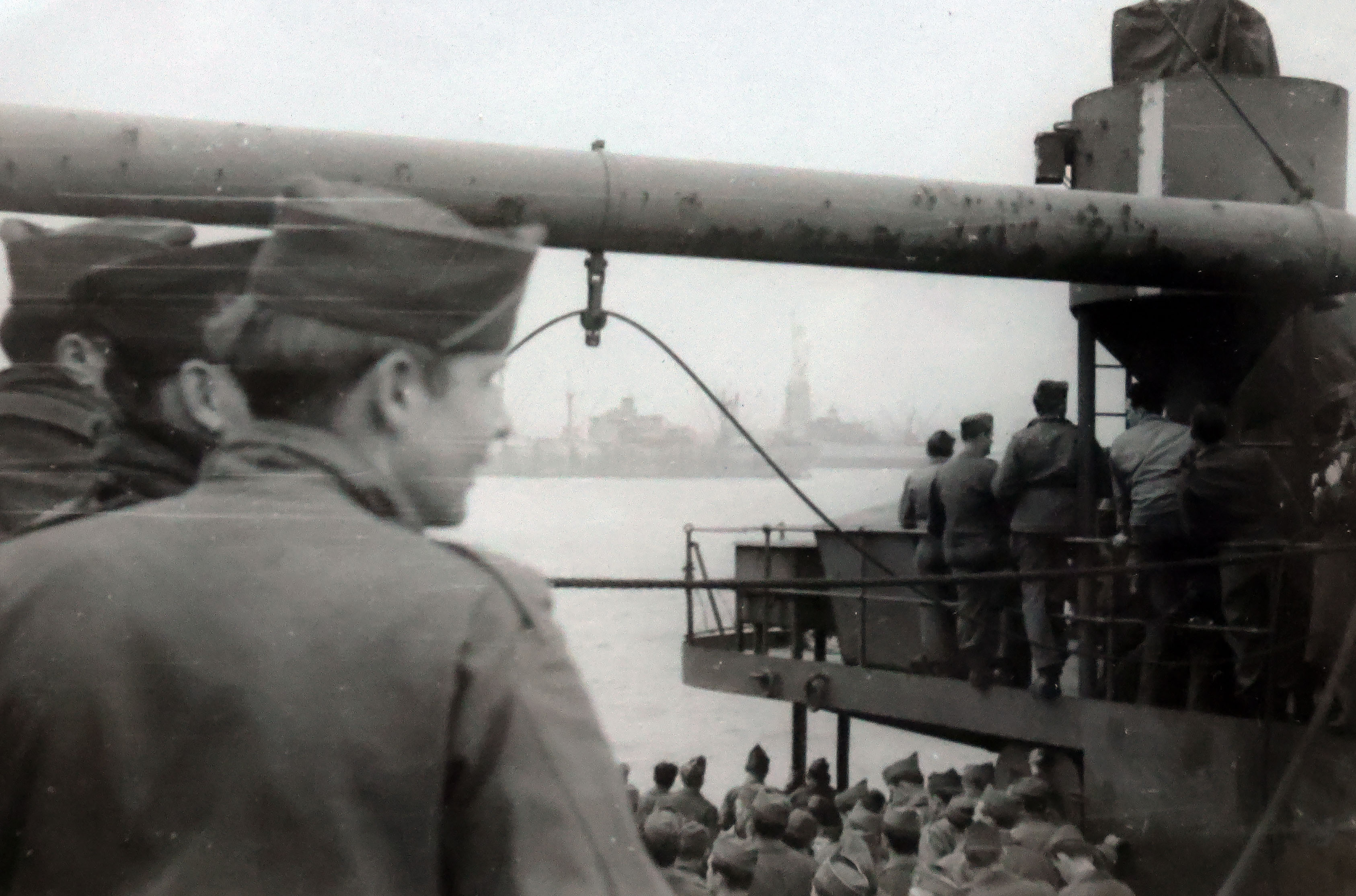
Soldiers from the 655TH ENGR TOPO BN returning home past the Statue of Liberty on the USS General A.E. Anderson, April 1946

Many of the GIs to be repatriated were transferred to Camp Lucky Strike, located near Saint-Valery, France, and from there they sailed back to New York on the USS General A. E. Anderson (AP-111) . The Battalion size dropped to approximately 200 men. The photomapping company had to cease all technical operations and instead set up training for the replacement personnel. Several German reproduction technicians were hired to fill in some of the skill gaps.

At the beginning of April, the only technical section in operation was the reproduction company due to shortages of parts, materials, and trained technicians. However, with the influx of a four experienced Master Sergeants, it was possible to revive the Photomapping and Drafting schools, and start a Surveying school. By the end of June productive work was being turned out again after a lapse of four months. Mapping work included work on Berlin and Frankfort town plans, and various projects in Bavaria and Germany.

Both the Photomapping and Reproduction platoons continued in production through the end of September 1946, however, there were no assigned projects for the Survey platoon, so they continued on with their training program.

During the period from October 1, 1946, to November 30, 1946, the unit experienced increasing rumors of inactivation. The Battalion continued to supply personnel for the Casey Jones Project (post-hostilities aerial mapping of Europe) and other assignments, even though the overall amount of work accomplished by the Battalion during this time was greatly lessened due to the lack of trained personnel. Most of the existing troops' time continued to be spent in training.

Shortages of diesel oil and coal caused slow-downs in the technical work areas. Spare parts for the vehicles were not available, so many of the vehicles were sidelined. The rapid turnover of enlisted personnel was felt to be responsible for causing large amounts of loss and damage of government property. Lower morale and efficiency was observed among the remaining regular army men awaiting return to the United States.

On November 26, 1946, Col. Unverferth was relieved from assignment with the Battalion and assigned to the 1681st Engineer Survey Team. Command of the Battalion was assumed by the executive officer Captain Wayne W. Walters.

The unit was officially deactivated in December 1946.

== Notes ==
655th Engineer Topographic Battalion Official Memos and History Book.

655th Engineer Topographic Battalion Company “A” Roster.
- 655th Engineer Topographic Battalion General Orders and Battalion History documents, reproduced for the Unclassified / Declassified Holdings of the National Archives, acquired from the National Archives at College Park, 8601 Adelphi Road, College Park, MD, 20740
- Definitions and examples of topographic maps
