= Far East Strategic Reserve =

The British Commonwealth Far East Strategic Reserve (commonly referred to as the Far East Strategic Reserve or the FESR) was a joint military force of the British, Australian, and New Zealand armed forces. Created in the 1950s and based in Malaya, the FESR was conceived as a forward defence point for Australia and New Zealand, while protecting Commonwealth interests in the Southeast Asian region from both internal and external communist threats. The FESR was made up of an infantry brigade and an aircraft carrier group, supported by squadrons of aircraft.

== Creation ==
The FESR originated from a June 1953 letter from Harold Alexander, the British Minister of Defence, to Philip McBride and Tom Macdonald, his equivalents in Australia and New Zealand ministries, respectively. The letter suggested the creation of a joint military force based in South-East Asia and tasked with protecting strategically important Commonwealth interests in the region (namely Sarawak, North Borneo, Malaya and Singapore), from the threat of attack by communist forces. The freeing up of military resources following the end of the Korean War was another factor.

Correspondence between the defence ministers of the three nations and their subordinates led to a meeting in Melbourne, Australia during October 1953. From this meeting, it was decided to create the FESR: a multinational force consisting of army, navy, and air force units from the three nations' armed forces. It was not until 1955 that the Reserve was established.

== Commitments ==
The FESR consisted of a brigade-strength infantry force known as 28th British Commonwealth Brigade and a carrier battle group, supported by land- and ship-based fighter and bomber squadrons. The Strategic Reserve's primary role was to protect Malaya and other Commonwealth interests in Southeast Asia from attack by external communist forces, with operations against internal communist organisations listed as the secondary role.

=== Australia ===
The decision to participate in the FESR was formally announced by Australian prime minister Robert Menzies in April 1955. Australian military units committed to the force included one light infantry battalion, between two and four destroyers or frigates, and two to three squadrons of aircraft (at least one each of bombers and fighters). An Australian aircraft carrier was to make an annual visit to participate in training exercises.

Australian forces remained under Australian command and control (unlike most earlier deployments in conjunction with British forces), but were to be used under the directives of the British Commander in Chief, Far East Fleet.

Australian units deployed to the FESR included:

Australian Army

- 1st Battalion, Royal Australian Regiment (1959–61),
- 2nd Battalion, Royal Australian Regiment (two tours of duty),
- 3rd Battalion, Royal Australian Regiment.
- 103rd Battery, Royal Australian Artillery (1961 - 1963), http://www.australianartilleryassociation.org/books/Whose-Name-We-Share/60/index.html

Royal Australian Air Force

- No. 1 Squadron RAAF (flying Avro Lincolns and later English Electric Canberra bombers),
- No. 2 Squadron RAAF (flying Avro Lincolns and later English Electric Canberra bombers),
- No. 3 Squadron RAAF (flying CAC Sabre fighters),
- No. 77 Squadron RAAF (flying CAC Sabre fighters),

Royal Australian Navy
(based out of Singapore Naval Base)

- HMAS Anzac,
- HMAS Arunta,
- HMAS Derwent - anti-submarine frigate
- HMAS Melbourne, - light aircraft carrier
- HMAS Parramatta - Type 12 frigate
- HMAS Quadrant,
- HMAS Queenborough,
- HMAS Quiberon,
- HMAS Quickmatch,
- HMAS Stuart,
- HMAS Sydney, - light aircraft carrier
- HMAS Tobruk,
- HMAS Vampire,
- HMAS Vendetta,
- HMAS Voyager,
- HMAS Warramunga
- HMAS Yarra - anti-submarine frigate

=== New Zealand ===
New Zealand contributed to the FESR from 1955. New Zealand's contribution to the FESR included:

Royal New Zealand Navy

New Zealand would commit two frigates with another available in case of emergencies.

- HMNZS Blackpool - Type 12 frigate
- HMNZS Royalist - light cruiser
- HMNZS Taranaki - Type 12M frigate
- HMNZS Otago - Type 12M frigate
- HMNZS Hickleton - minesweeper
- HMNZS Santon - minesweeper
- HMNZS Waikato - Leander-class frigate

New Zealand Army

New Zealand Special Air Service, (1955 to 1957)

New Zealand Infantry Battalion and support units as part of 28th Commonwealth Infantry Brigade Group.

- 1st Battalion of the New Zealand Regiment (1958 to 1959)
- 2nd Battalion of the New Zealand Regiment (1959 to 1961)
- 1st Battalion of the New Zealand Regiment (1961 to 1964)
- 1st Battalion, Royal New Zealand Infantry Regiment (1964 to 1971)

Royal New Zealand Air Force

- No. 14 Squadron (1955 to 1958)
- No. 75 Squadron (1958 to 1962)
- No. 41 Squadron (1955 to 1971)

=== United Kingdom ===
The British commitment was based around forces already in South-East Asia, including the Eastern Fleet, the Far East Air Force, and British Far East Command.

== History ==
From late 1955 until 1960, FESR infantry forces operated against the Malayan National Liberation Army during the Malayan Emergency. The Strategic Reserve was also involved in the Indonesia–Malaysia confrontation. FESR forces participated in South East Asia Treaty Organisation exercises.

In 1971 the FESR was superseded by the ANZUK Force.

Today, the Shrine of Remembrance memorial in Melbourne, Victoria, Australia conducts regular wreath laying commemorations in honor of FESR soldiers.

== See also ==
- ANZUK
- Military history of Britain
- New Zealand Force South East Asia
