= David Wells (admiral) =

- Born: 19 November 1918; Inverell, New South Wales
- Died: 27 September 1983 (aged 64); Coolah, New South Wales
- Military career
- Allegiance: Australia
- Branch: Royal Australian Navy
- Service years: 1933–1975
- Rank: Rear Admiral
- Commands: HM Australian Fleet (1974–75); ANZUK (1971–73); Deputy Chief of Naval Staff (1970–71); East Australia Area (1968–70); HMAS Albatross (1967–68); HMAS Melbourne (1965–67); HMAS Voyager (1959–60); HMAS Queenborough (1954–56)
- Conflicts: Second World War; Battle of the Atlantic; Battle of the Mediterranean; Arctic convoys; South West Pacific theatre; Battle of Leyte Gulf; Vietnam War
- Awards: Commander of the Order of the British Empire

Rear Admiral David Charles Wells, CBE (19 November 1918 – 27 September 1983) was a senior commander in the Royal Australian Navy, who commanded ANZUK in Singapore from its formation in November 1971 until 1973.

== Naval career ==
Wells entered the Royal Australian Navy's College at the Flinders Naval Depot in January 1933, aged 14. Almost four years later, he was awarded maximum time towards early promotion to lieutenant) as well as prizes for excellence in maths, physics and chemistry.

He earned the Otto Albert prize for seamanship, and the King's Gold Medal for most exemplary conduct, performance of duty and good influence among his peers. Wells was promoted to midshipman in January 1937.

From 1970–71 Rear Admiral Wells served as the Deputy Chief of Naval Staff in Canberra, in recognition of which he was appointed a Commander of the Order of the British Empire in 1971. Wells commanded the tri-nation and tri-service ANZUK force based in Singapore from 1971 to 1973 and, on his return to Australia, was posted as Flag Officer Commanding HM Australian Fleet from February 1974 to November 1975, after which he retired.

== Last years and death ==
Wells died at Coolah, New South Wales on 27 September 1983, aged 64.

Military offices
Preceded by Rear Admiral Anthony Synnot	Flag Officer Commanding HM Australian Fleet; 1974–1975	Succeeded by Rear Admiral Geoffrey Gladstone
New command	Commander ANZUK; 1971–1973	Succeeded by Air Vice Marshal Richard Wakeford
Preceded by Rear Admiral David Stevenson	Deputy Chief of Naval Staff; 1970–1971	Succeeded by Rear Admiral Anthony Synnot
Preceded by Rear Admiral Thomas Morrison	Flag Officer-in-Charge East Australia Area; 1968–1970	Succeeded by Rear Admiral Gordon Crabb
