= Army Ordnance Corps (India) =

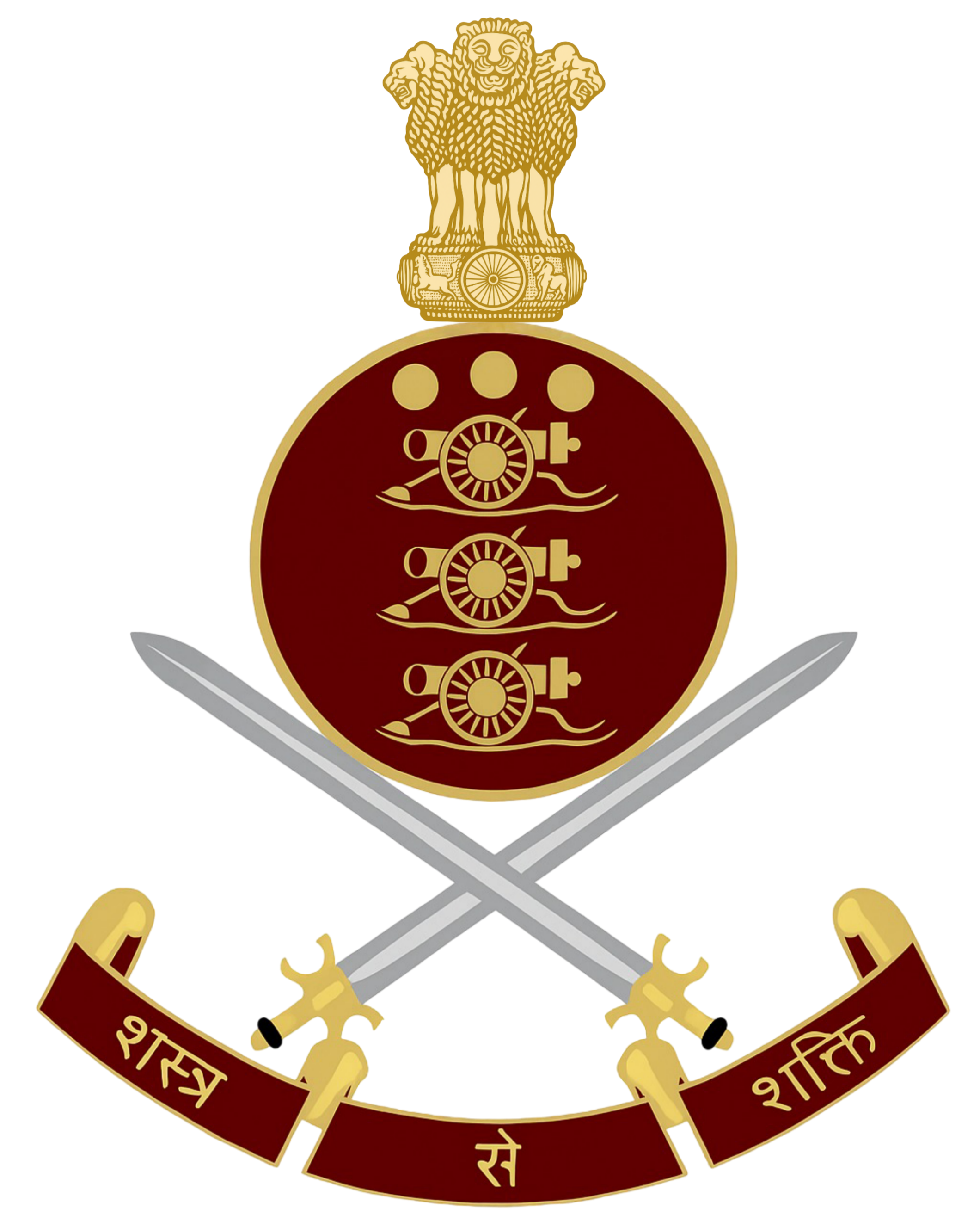
- Insignia of Army Ordnance Corps
- Active: April 8, 1775; 251 years ago
- Country: India (1947–present)
- Allegiance: Republic of India
- Branch: Indian Army
- Role: Material and logistic support
- Mottos: Shastra Se Shakti; English: Strength Through Arms
- Colors: Navy blue & Red
- Anniversaries: 8 April
- Engagements: Indo-Pakistani War of 1947; Sino-Indian War of 1962; Indo-Pak War of 1965; Indo-Pak War of 1971; 1999 Kargil Conflict
- Website: https://www.aocrecruitment.gov.in

Commanders
- Director General Ordnance Services & Colonel Commandant: Lieutenant General Deepak Ahuja

The Army Ordnance Corps (abbreviated as AOC) is an active corps of the Indian Army and a major formation responsible for providing material and logistical support to the Indian Army during war and peace.

== History ==
=== Pre-independence ===
The history of ordnance in India dates back to the 15th century. The early ordnance stores in the Indian sub-continent were established by the British East India Company for their logistical requirements. Following the military expansion of the company, the needs of military troops increased which in turn required the support of an ordnance department. By accepting the report of then Commander-in-Chief of the Bengal Army, Lieutenant General Sir John Clavering, the Board of Ordnance was established on April 8, 1775. This is considered to be the first step towards the recognition of the Army Ordnance Corps (AOC). Initially the board was put under the control of the Bengal Presidency.

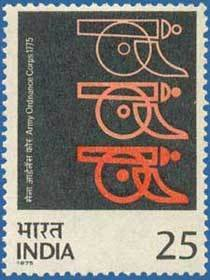
1975 stamp to commemorate the bicentenary Indian Army Ordnance Corps

With the increasing influence of the British crown over the sub-continent, the number of British troops increased significantly. In 1874, a "Special Ordnance Commission" was appointed by the government to prepare a report on the establishment of a new ordnance system at the national level. The report which was submitted on 7 April 1875 recommended a centralized system and the establishment of ordnance factories in the country. A report by the Army in India Commission, which was constituted in May 1879 by Lord Lytton, (Note: Viceroy and Governor-General of India from 12 April 1876 to 8 June 1880.) recommended the establishment of a centralized all-India organisation, headed by a Director General of Ordnance. On 1 April 1884, the Ordnance Department of India came into existence. The Ordnance's three Presidencies (Note: Bengal Presidency, Madras Presidency, and Bombay Presidency) of the British Raj were integrated into one. An Inspector General of Ordnance was appointed to each Presidency and was responsible to the Director General at the national level. Following the Partition of Bengal (1905), the Ordnance was split into two, each with an Inspector General. Several reorganizations took place during the tenure of Lord Kitchener as the Commander-in-Chief of India.

Overruling the report of the Esher Committee of 1919 recommended that a civilian member be in charge of civil business, a military officer was put in-charge of manufacture and production as Master General of Supply. Later in 1929, the office of Master of General of Supply was rechristened Master General of Ordnance.

With the start of the Second World War in September 1939, the AOC began a major expansion that continued to the end of the war in 1945. The number of installations rose from 10 to 77 in the span of six years. On 1 May 1943, the Indian Electrical and Mechanical Engineers (IEME) was separated from Indian Army Ordnance Corps.

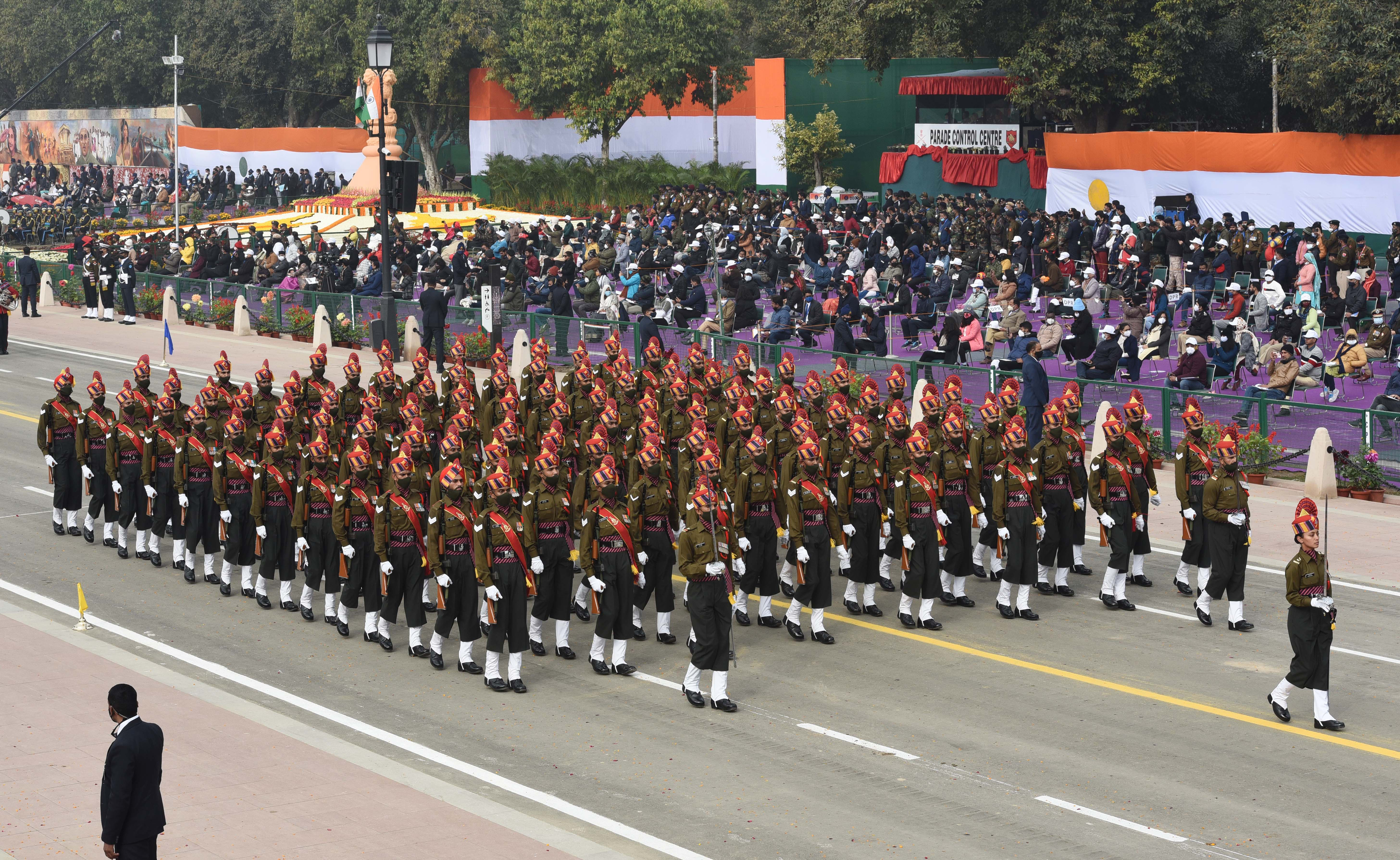
Army Ordnance Corps Marching Contingent, Republic Day Parade, 2022

=== Post-independence ===
After India became a republic on 26 January 1950, the corps was rechristened as the Army Ordnance Corps dropping the prefix Indian.

== Role and function ==
The Army Ordnance Corps main responsibility is to provide material and logistics support to the Indian Army and, if required, to the Navy and Air Force during war and peace. The inventory that the Army Ordnance Corps is responsible for ranges from clothing (e.g. coats, sleeping bags, gloves, goggles, etc.) to vehicles, equipment and munitions (e.g. bullets, artillery shells, missiles, etc.). The supply of fuel, fodder, and medicines are maintained by the Indian Army Service Corps, the Military Farms Service/Army Remount and Veterinary Corps and the Army Medical Corps respectively.

== Training academy ==
The Army Ordnance Corps centre in Secunderabad is the training academy of the corps. The AOC centre is responsible to impart training to the ordnance corps personnel. Apart from military training, the AOC personnel are also trained in different kinds of repair works, ancillary trades such as carpentry, tailoring, saddlery, driving etc.

== Regimental insignia ==
=== Crest ===
Evolution of AOC crest from 1855

- 1855 – The first crest of the Corps was adopted in 1855 with the motto of the corps Sua Tela Tonanti.
- 1896 – Queen Victoria approved the recommendation of the War Office to adopt a badge instead of crest. Separate badges were designed for officers and other personnel but with only small differences on the scroll.
- 1918 – After actively taking part in the First World War on behalf of the British, the prefix "Royal" was granted by King George V, the Corps renamed the Royal Army Ordnance Corps and the crest modified.
- 1922 – When the Corps was renamed the Indian Army Ordnance Corps in 1922, the crest was again modified. It contained three cannon balls and three field pieces on the shield with a crown on the top.
- 1954 – After India became a republic in 1950, the prefix "Indian" was dropped and the Corps was renamed the Army Ordnance Corps. The modified crest is similar to the previous one of 1922. It contained three cannon balls and three field pieces on a circular shield. The crown was replaced by the national emblem of India with a pair of crossed swords at the bottom.
- 1978 - The newly adopted motto Shastra se Shakti was incorporated in the scroll.

=== Flag and pennant ===
Flag and pennant

==== Regimental flag ====
A navy blue background "with a narrow horizontal saxe blue band between two broader maroon bands across the middle".

==== Pennant ====
The pennant is a triangle rotated through 90 degrees in a clockwise direction with the navy blue color filled in. The red coloured oval is present at the extreme right. The standard dimensions of the pennant are 0.9 meters by 0.6 meters with the red oval of 0.3 meters.

=== Colours ===
The Corps' regimental colours were awarded on 8 December 1970, by then Vice President of India, Gopal Swarup Pathak at the Army Ordnance Centre in Secunderabad. The colour is a silken flag filled with scarlet, and the Corps' crest in the center surrounded by Ashoka and Lotus leaves.

== See also ==
- Royal Army Ordnance Corps
- Royal Logistic Corps
- Royal Australian Army Ordnance Corps
- Royal New Zealand Army Ordnance Corps
- Commonwealth Ordnance Services in Malaya and Singapore
