= W. P. B. Ashton =

Brigadier W. P. B. Ashton, MC, CBE, (1897–1981) was a British Army officer and mechanical engineer who served in Malaya during the Second World War. Papers relating to his service are held by the Liddell Hart Centre for Military Archives, King's College London.

== Early life ==
W.P.B. Ashton was born in 1897. He obtained a Bachelor of Science degree.

== Career ==
Ashton served in the Royal Electrical and Mechanical Engineers of the British Army during the Second World War and was deputy director of ordnance services (engineering), Malaya Command, 1941–1942. His report on ordnance engineering services in Malaya, 1941–1942, written in 1946, is held in the Liddell Hart Centre for Military Archives, King's College London. He was awarded the Military Cross.

He was an associate member of the Institute of Mechanical Engineers. He was appointed Commander of the Order of the British Empire in the 1953 New Year's Honours List.

== See also ==
- Commonwealth Ordnance Services in Malaya and Singapore
- List of British generals and brigadiers
