= 5 Advanced Ordnance Depot =

- Active: 1 March 1970 – August 1971
- Country: Australia; New Zealand
- Branch: RAAOC; RNZAOC
- Garrison/HQ: Singapore

Commanders
- Notable commanders: Major N.W Spencer, RAAOC

5 Advanced Ordnance Depot (5 AOD) was a short lived Royal Australian Army Ordnance Corps and Royal New Zealand Army Ordnance Corps combined Depot in Singapore 1970 to 1971.

== 5 AOD ==
As a result of the Five Power Defence Arrangements (FPDA). 5 AOD was formed by Australia and New Zealand in 1970 to support the Australian and New Zealand Forces remaining in Singapore post the British withdrawal.

5 AOD was set up from scratch in March 1970 and as the first order of business finding working accommodation was a priority. The Singapore authorities were unwilling to provide suitable accommodation in any of the recently vacated British facility’s, so as a temporary measure 5 AOD was housed with the Royal Army Ordnance Corps (RAOC), 3 Base Ordnance Depot (3 BOD) at Alexandria and Keat Hong. Eventually 5 AOD was located at Transit Shed No 4 at the Sembawang Naval Basin on 15 July 1970.

In-scaling of stores was achieved by assuming the responsibilities of the Australian Cell of 3 BOD and their existing stocks. Additional stocks were delivered direct from Australia by HMAS Jeparit. By October 1970 5 AOD was functioning as a unit.

The Strength of 5 AOD in September 1970 was:

- 10 Officers
- 38 Other Ranks
- 58 Locally Employed Civilians (LECs)

New Zealand strength within 5 AOD averaged two Officers and 18 Other Ranks.

The Officer Commanding go 5 AOD was:

- Major N.W Spencer RAAOC

In 1971 the United Kingdom decided that’s its forces were to remain in Singapore and as an economy measure it would be sensible to have a combined UK, Australian and New Zealand Ordnance Depot and as a result 5 AOD ceased to exist on Aug 1971 and its responsibility, personnel and stock absorbed by the new ANZUK Ordnance Depot.

== See also ==
- Royal Australian Army Ordnance Corps
- Royal New Zealand Army Ordnance Corps
- Military history of New Zealand
- Military history of New Zealand in Malaysia
- New Zealand in the Vietnam War
- Military history of Australia during the Vietnam War
- 28th Commonwealth Infantry Brigade Group
- ANZUK
- Commonwealth Ordnance Services in Malaya and Singapore
