= List of international prime ministerial trips made by Norman Kirk =

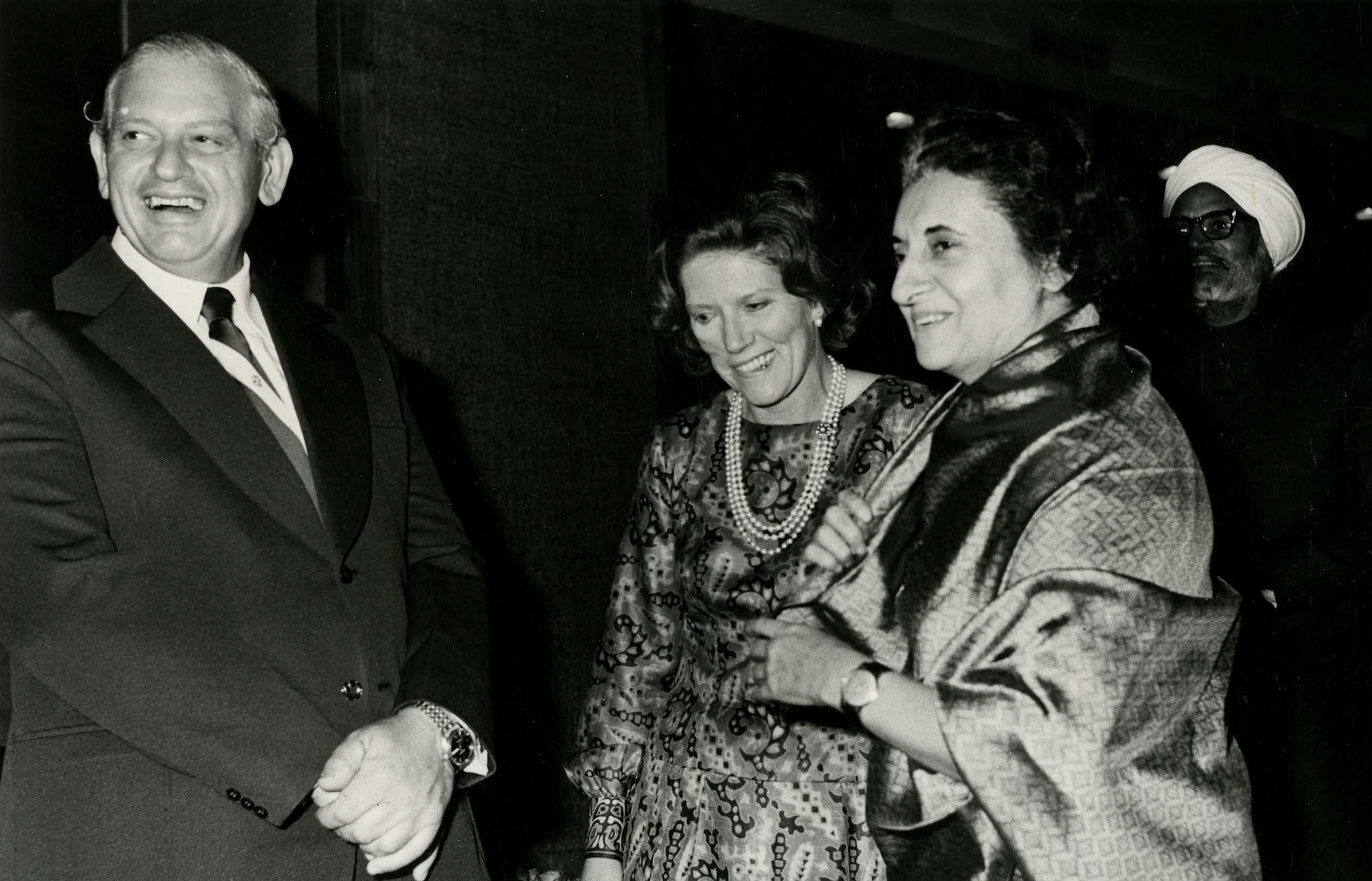
Kirk at the High Commissioner's reception on 29 December 1973 with Mrs Cunninghame, the wife of the New Zealand High Commissioner, and Indira Gandhi

Norman Kirk, who served as the 29th prime minister of New Zealand from 1972 to 1974, travelled internationally to attend bilateral and multilateral diplomatic meetings and to lead trade delegations. During his premiership, Kirk visited nine sovereign countries.

== Background ==
Kirk appointed himself as Minister of Foreign Affairs with Joe Walding as an associate and focused on external matters for much of his premiership.

== Summary ==
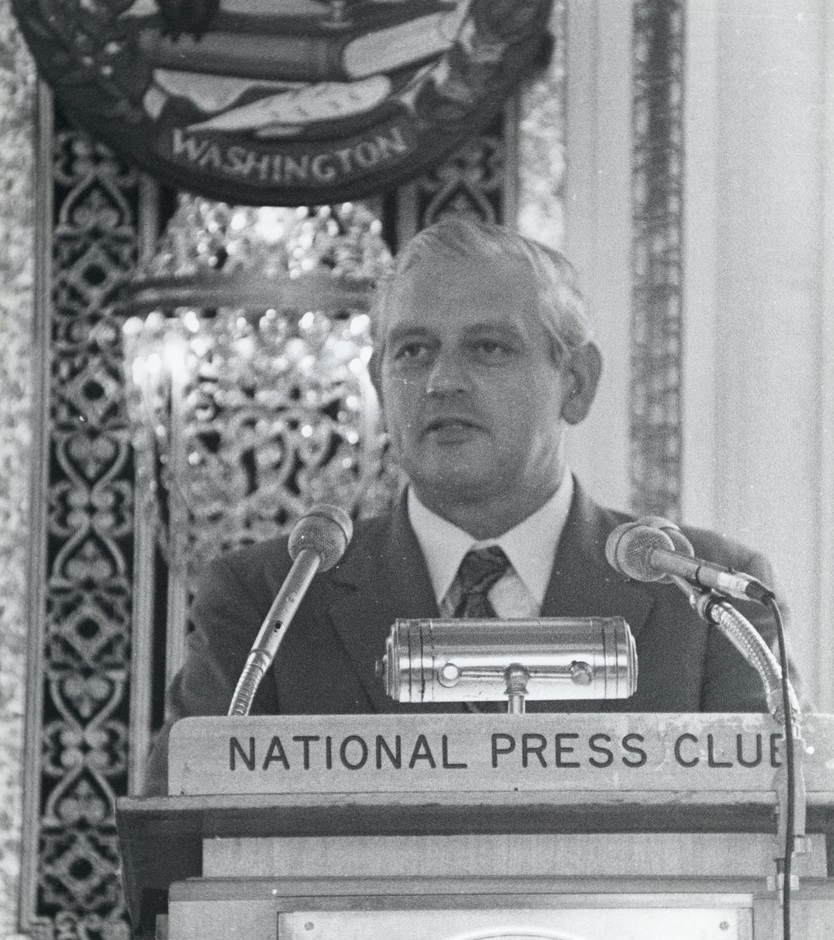
Kirk speaking at the National Press Club in Washington D.C. in September 1973

The table below lists Kirk's international prime ministerial trips:

=== 1973 ===
Country	Locations	Dates	Details
Western Samoa	Apia	17-24 April	Kirk attended the South Pacific Forum.
Cook Islands (Note: The Cook Islands are associated states of New Zealand.)	Rarotonga; Aitutaki	24 April	Kirk met with premier Albert Henry and agreed to give the Cook Islands more autonomy.
Canada	Ottawa	1-16 August	Kirk attended the 1973 Commonwealth Heads of Government Meeting.
United States	New York City; Washington D.C.	25 September-1 October	Kirk spoke at the United Nations General Assembly and met president Richard Nixon.
Australia	Canberra; Melbourne; Sydney	13-17 November	Kirk met prime minister Gough Whitlam and opened New Zealand's new chancery building at its High Commission.
Papua New Guinea	Port Moresby	12-13 December	Kirk had a bilateral meeting with chief minister Michael Somare and foreign minister Albert Maori Kiki.
Indonesia	Jakarta	13-18 December	Kirk met with president Suharto.
Malaysia	Kuala Lumpur	18-20 December	Kirk met with prime minister Abdul Razak Hussein.
Singapore	Singapore	21-23 December	Kirk met prime minister Lee Kuan Yew and visited servicemen at the Dieppe Barracks.
Indonesia	Medan; Lake Toba	23-26 December	Kirk met ambassador Soetikno and spent Christmas at Lake Toba.
India	New Delhi; Bangalore	27 December-1 January	Kirk met prime minister Indira Gandhi and president V. V. Giri.

=== 1974 ===
Country	Locations	Dates	Details
Bangladesh	Dacca; Chittagong	1-5 January	Kirk met prime minister Sheikh Mujibur Rahman and toured the reconstruction work underway following the Bangladesh Liberation War.
Singapore	Singapore	5-6 January	Kirk celebrated his 51st birthday.
Australia	Darwin	6 January	Kirk met with chief administrator Jock Nelson. A visit to Sydney is cancelled due to mechanical issues on the plane.

== See also ==
- Foreign relations of New Zealand
