= Richard Gordon Wakeford =

Royal Air Force air marshal (1922–2007)

- Born: 20 April 1922; Torquay, England
- Died: 13 February 2007 (aged 84); Aberdeen, Scotland
- Military career
- Allegiance: United Kingdom
- Branch: Royal Air Force
- Service years: 1941–1978
- Rank: Air marshal
- Nickname: Dickie
- Commands: ANZUK (1974); RAF Scampton (1964–65); Queen's Flight (1959–60)
- Conflicts: Second World War; Malayan Emergency
- Awards: Knight Commander of the Order of the Bath; Lieutenant of the Royal Victorian Order; Officer of the Order of the British Empire; Air Force Cross

Air Marshal Sir Richard Gordon Wakeford, KCB, LVO, OBE, AFC (20 April 1922 – 13 February 2007) was an officer in the Royal Air Force for 36 years, from 1941 to 1977. Beginning as a pilot of flying boats with Coastal Command, he became a flying instructor, and commanded the Queen's Flight. After various operational commands, his last post was as Deputy Chief of Defence (Intelligence) at the UK Ministry of Defence.

== Early life and war service ==
Wakeford was born in Torquay on 20 April 1922. He was educated at Kelly College, now known as Mount Kelly, in Tavistock, Devon.

Wakeford joined the Royal Air Force (RAF) in 1941. After flight training with the US Navy at Naval Air Station Pensacola in Florida, he joined Coastal Command to fly anti-submarine missions. He flew Catalina flying boats with No. 212 Squadron for 18 months from November 1942, patrolling the Indian Ocean from its base in Karachi. After a period training other pilots of flying boats, he joined No. 210 Squadron in October 1944, based at Sullom Voe in the Shetland Islands, patrolling the Norwegian Sea. He flew in support of Russian convoys and intercepted German submarines based in Norway.

Wakeford was involved in the last sinking of a German U-boat, on 8 May 1945. VE Day was the previous day, and all German submarines had been ordered to travel on the surface: submerged U-boats were liable to be attacked. Flying a Catalina over the North Atlantic, Wakeford detected a submerged German submarine. Having run out of depth charges, he dropped some sonobuoys to track the U-boat before returning to base in the Shetland Islands. A second Catalina relieved him and damaged U-320. The German submarine was later scuttled off the coast of Norway.

== Post-war career ==
After the war, Wakeford flew long-range Liberator and York transport aircraft with Transport Command in the Far East. He became a flying instructor at the RAF College at Cranwell. He married Anne Butler in 1948. He joined the Central Flying School as an examiner, testing other flying instructors, and received the Air Force Cross in 1953.

As a wing commander, he served in Malaya in 1955, during the Malayan Emergency. He was appointed an Officer of the Order of the British Empire in 1958. He was then commander of the Queen's Flight from 1959 to 1961, and was appointed a Member of the Royal Victorian Order (4th Class; later retitled as Lieutenant). He spent two years at the RAF Staff College, and was then promoted to group captain. He became commander of the V bomber base at RAF Scampton in June 1964, in charge of three squadrons of Vulcan bombers. He was assistant commandant of the RAF College from 1966 to 1969, during the period when it merged with the RAF Technical College at Henlow.

He was promoted to air vice-marshal in February 1969, and became Commander of the Northern Maritime Air Region, and Air Officer Scotland and Northern Ireland (AOSNI), based at Pitreavie Castle in Fife, where he was responsible for the squadrons that tracked Russian forces in the North Atlantic. He was Director of Service Intelligence at the Ministry of Defence, and was the second commander of the short-lived ANZUK Force, based in Singapore, from 1973 until it was disbanded in January 1975. His last post was as Deputy Chief of Defence (Intelligence) at the Ministry of Defence, from 1975 to 1978. He was appointed a Knight Commander of the Order of the Bath in 1976.

== Later life ==
He retired to Perthshire in 1977, where he enjoyed fly fishing and golf. He was director of the RAF Benevolent Fund in Scotland from 1978 to 1989, and served as a trustee of the MacRobert Trust from 1980 (chairman from 1982 to 1994), supporting hospitals and welfare organisations that assist ex-servicemen, and other educational organisations. He became a Commander of the Order of St John in 1986 and was awarded the inaugural President's Medal of the Royal Academy of Engineering in 1987. He moved to Inchberry in Moray in 1987.

His wife died in 2002. He died from cancer of the oesophagus in Aberdeen. He was survived by two sons, Richard and Christopher, and a daughter, Susan. A second daughter, Sally, predeceased him.

Military offices
Preceded by Sir David Willison	Deputy Chief of Defence Staff (Intelligence); 1975–1978	Succeeded by Sir Roy Halliday
