= Val d'Or, Penang =

Val d'Or
- Neighbourhood of Seberang Perai
- Location within Seberang Perai in Penang
- Coordinates: 5°14′44.6706″N 100°29′8.9304″E
- Country: Malaysia
- State: Penang
- City: Seberang Perai
- District: South Seberang Perai
- Time zone: UTC+8 (MST)
  - Summer (DST): Not observed
- Postal code: 14200

Val d'Or is a residential neighbourhood within the city of Seberang Perai in the Malaysian state of Penang. The mainly agricultural area is located between Simpang Ampat to the north and Sungai Bakap to the south, both of which are also within the South Seberang Perai District.

Jalan Valdor serves as the main thoroughfare within the town, with the southern end of the road connecting with Federal Route 1, which runs the length of western Peninsular Malaysia.

== Etymology ==
In French, Val d'Or meant a valley of gold. The town of Val d'Or had a French connection in the mid-19th century, when two Frenchmen arrived and set up an agricultural estate within the town.

== History ==
In the mid-19th century, a Frenchman by the name of Donnadieu arrived at what is now Val d'Or. He subsequently established a sugar cane plantation at the area, and was later joined by a second Frenchman, Leopold Chasseriau. However, Donnadieu came to a tragic end when he was murdered by unknown assassins.

Meanwhile, in 1852, Kee Lye Huat, an ethnic Chinese, landed in Province Wellesley (now Seberang Perai). Starting out as a coolie, he gradually became a successful sugar planter and the owner of the Val d'Or sugar cane estate; he is now credited as the founder of the town. Kee also played an instrumental role in the development of nearby Sungai Bakap. In 1872, he established the Kee Poh Huat Kongsi in Sungai Bakap, where his descendants still reside to this day.

== Education ==
Val d'Or is home to a Chinese primary school and a high school, SJKC Valdor and SMK Valdor, respectively

== Transportation ==
Val d'Or is accessible via either the North–South Expressway's Jawi Interchange (Exit 156) or Bukit Tambun Interchange (Exit 158). Federal Route 1 links both interchanges with the town.

== See also ==
- Sungai Jawi
- Nibong Tebal
