= New Zealand Force South East Asia =

- Active: 1974–1989
- Country: New Zealand
- Garrison/HQ: Singapore

New Zealand Force South East Asia (NZFORSEA) (1974–1989) comprised the elements of the Royal New Zealand Navy, New Zealand Army and Royal New Zealand Air Force. Much of the New Zealand military left Singapore as part of operation Kupe in 1989, leaving behind a residual Defence Support Unit (NZDSU).

== Background ==
Although New Zealand has had a military presence in South East Asia for most of the post WWII period, it was not until the disestablishment of the ANZUK Force in 1974, comprising Australian, New Zealand and United Kingdom military personnel, that New Zealand established a self-supporting national presence in the region.

Formally established on 30 January 1974, NZFORSEA was under the direct command of Ministry of Defence in New Zealand. Although NZFORSEA was based in Singapore, its normal area of operation, the territories of Malaysia and Singapore, was identical with its predecessor, the ANZUK Force.

=== Administrative arrangements and function ===
The ANZUK Force operated under the 1971 Five Power Defence Arrangements (FPDA) between Australia, New Zealand, United Kingdom, Singapore and Malaysia. This arrangement provided the framework for NZ FORSEA whose primary role was defined to be:

- Promote stability in the area.
- Enhance New Zealand's political and diplomatic influence in the region.
- Assist the development of the Armed Forces of countries in the area.
- Implement the Mutual Assistance Programme, where the force provided assistance and conducted exercises with armed forces of countries in the area, particularly those of Singapore and Malaysia.

With the Headquarters sited at the Stores Basin area adjacent to the current Sembawang Naval Basin, This was the last major foreign military presence based in Singapore. Total military strength at the time stood at 850 with some 700 dependants. NZFORSEA took over many of British married quarters, recreational and welfare facilities at Nee Soon, Sembawang and Woodlands.

== Units of the NZFORSEA ==
NZFORSEA was required to provide its own logistical support as well as a number of services to United Kingdom and Australian forces and comprised the following units during it existence:

=== NZ Force Headquarters ===
HQ NZFORSEA was a Tri-service Headquarters unit, commanded by a Brigadier equivalent and provided a headquarters with a nucleus of staff officers and support staff, including

- Personnel Branch
- Operations Branch
- Finance Branch (Finance Advisor and the Civilian Establishment and Pay Office (CEPO))
- Support Branch
  - Education Section,
  - Photographic Section,
  - Communications Centre,
  - Pass Issue Office.
- NZ Installation Auxiliary Police Unit
  The Installations Auxiliary Police Force (IAPF) was a small police force, staffed by Singaporeans but commanded by an NZ officer to provide security to the whole area.
- Legal Services Office.

=== ANZMIS ===
Australian New Zealand Military Intelligence Staff

=== Royal New Zealand Navy ===
Although no Royal New Zealand Navy (RNZN) vessels were permanently based at Singapore, there were frequent deployments of RNZN vessels and a good number of individual RNZN personnel were posted to all of the NZFORSEA units

=== 1 RNZIR ===
Based at Dieppe Barracks, 1st Battalion Royal New Zealand Infantry Regiment (1 RNZIR) was a light infantry battalion with a long history in South East Asia, Originally deployed to South East Asia in 1957, the battalion was first based at Taiping and then Terendak in Malaysia, Nee Soon Camp and Dieppe Barracks in Singapore. In its 32-year history serving in South East Asia, the Battalion had been involved in the Malayan Emergency 1950–1960, the Indonesia–Malaysia Confrontation1963–66 and the Vietnam War 1967–1971.

=== NZ Transport Squadron ===
NZ Transport Squadron was responsible for providing Movements, Catering and Transport support the NZFORSEA units. Originally created as E Platoon 10 Transport Coy, Royal New Zealand Army Service Corps(RNZASC) in April 1974 at Dieppe Barracks. In October 1974 it was unofficially renamed 18(NZ) Transport Company, RNZASC and relocated to the Naval Base. In May 1979 it was renamed NZ Transport Squadron Royal New Zealand Corps of Transport (RNZCT)

=== NZ Advanced Ordnance Depot ===
From 1974 to 1989 the Royal New Zealand Army Ordnance Corps (RNZAOC) maintained the New Zealand Advanced Ordnance Depot (NZAOD) in Singapore in order to provide Ordnance services to NZFORSEA units.

=== NZ Work Services Unit ===
Formed on 1 September 1975, NZ Work Services Unit (NZWSU) primary responsibility was the maintenance and repair of all NZFORSEA buildings and real estate.

=== NZ Force Hospital ===
Located at the former Royal Navy Medical Centre Woodlands, the NZ Force hospital provided medical care for NZ servicemen, NZ Civilian staff, dependants and members of visiting forces.

=== NZ Dental Unit ===
Formed on 1 May 1974, the NZ Dental Unit provided Dental Services to NZ servicemen, NZ Civilian staff, dependants and members of visiting forces.

=== NZ MP Unit ===
A Tri-Service platoon sized unit, The NZ MP unit provided policing support to NZFORSEA.

=== NZ Workshops ===
A Royal New Zealand Electrical and Mechanical Engineers (RNZEME) unit, NZ Workshop was established at Kangaw Barracks on 1 October 1974 when the ANZUK Workshop was split into the 28 UK Bde Spt Workshop and NZ workshop NZFORSEA. Progressively moving into the former Royal Navy (MT) Workshop at the Naval Base as Royal Navy withdrew. As much as possible the NZ Workshop provided services on par with a New Zealand RNZEME Workshop, including;

- HQ and Orderly Room
- Production Cell
- MT Section
- GE Section
- Tels Section
- Instrument Section
- Trade Repair Section
- Quartermaster Section
- NZAOC Stores Section

=== 41 Squadron RNZAF ===
41 Squadron RNZAF Originally deployed to RAF Changi in Singapore as part of an expansion of New Zealand's commitment to the Commonwealth Far East Strategic Reserve in 1955 and was equipped with four Bristol Freighters. From 1971 a flight equipped with Bell UH-1 Iroquois helicopters joined 41 Squadron.

In December 1977 41 Squadron returned to New Zealand and disbanded during December 1977. Following the disbandment of the unit, its Iroquois aircraft remained in Singapore as Support Unit Singapore.

=== Support Unit Singapore/141 Flight RNZAF ===
Support Unit Singapore, which was renamed No. 141 Flight RNZAF in 1985 to recognise its 41 Squadron origins. This flight was disbanded in 1989, ending the permanent presence of RNZAF units in South East Asia.

== Education ==
To support the Force and dependants NZFORSEA maintained a number of educational facilities:

=== NZ Force Library ===
The NZ force Library consisted of two libraries:

- Dieppe Barracks, which served 1 RNZIR and 141 Flight
- Sembawang Library, which was both a school and community Library

=== NZ Force Playgroup ===
NZ Force Playgroup was run by mothers and catered for children 0–3 years

=== NZ Force Preschool ===
NZ Force Playgroup for children 3–5 years

=== NZ Force School ===
The NZ Force School traced its roots back to the 1960s when 1 RNZIR was based in Terendak Camp in Malaysia. Up to 1974 schooling for NZ dependants was provided in combined Australian/United Kingdom and New Zealand Schools at Woodlands, Changi, Tengah and Sembawang. In 1976 the school came under New Zealand Department of Education regulations. By 1981 all the schools were centralised at Sembawang. Schooling was provided for New Zealand dependants, from infant classes to Form 7 (year 13).

== Welfare and Recreation ==
NZFORSEA provided soldiers and dependants many welfare and recreational activities, including:

- NZ Force Triathlon Team
- NZ Force Tennis club
- NZ Force Squash Club
- Tigers Rugby club
- NZ Force Soccer club
- NZ Force Runners club
- NZ Force Taekwondo
- Kiwi Woman's Bowling League
- Neptune Swimming club
- NZ Force Theatre club
- NZ Force Scouts and Guides

== Dress Distinctions ==
NZ Army personnel posted to NZFORSEA wore the following dress distinctions:

- NZ Flash – NZ Flash was affixed to each shoulder epaulette.

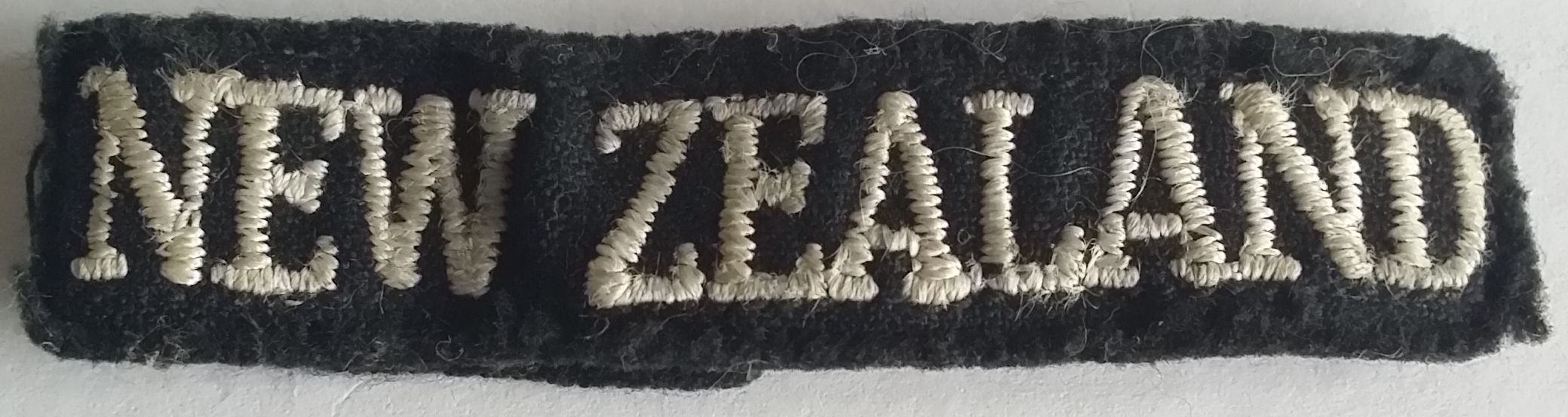
NZ epaulette flash

- Kiwis – NZ Army posted to NZFORSEA wore a Kiwi patch on each shoulder, except for 1 RNZIR personnel who only wore the Kiwi patch on the right shoulder.

== See also ==
- Military history of New Zealand
- Military history of New Zealand in Malaysia
- New Zealand in the Vietnam War
- Military history of Australia during the Vietnam War
- Military Reenactment Society of New Zealand
- ANZUK
