= 28th Commonwealth Infantry Brigade Group =

- Active: 16 September 1955– 31 October 1971
- Country: United Kingdom; Australia; New Zealand
- Branch: British Army; Australian Army; New Zealand Army
- Type: Infantry
- Role: Infantry Brigade Group for the Strategic Reserve
- Size: Brigade
- Part of: Far East Strategic Reserve
- Garrison/HQ: Terandak, Malaysia

The 28th Commonwealth Infantry Brigade Group was a Commonwealth formation of the Far East Strategic Reserve, based in Malaysia from 1955 to 1971 of which elements participated in the Malayan Emergency, Indonesia Confrontation and the Vietnam War.

== History ==
The 28th Commonwealth Infantry Brigade Group was formed in Malaya on 16 September 1955 with a combination of forces from Australia, New Zealand and the United Kingdom. Its main elements were three infantry battalions from Australia, the United Kingdom and New Zealand and a British field artillery regiment with an Australian battery. The Brigade's operational role was as the 'Immediate Reaction Force' for the South East Asia Treaty Organisation.

The brigade was initially dispersed to various sites throughout Northern Malaya, including Penang, Ipoh and Taiping. This provided logistical challenges, and after Malaysia Independence in 1957, Bukit Terendak close to Malacca was chosen as the new home for the Brigade. Terendak would house the entire brigade with its infantry battalions and support units, military hospital, airstrip, married quarters areas and shopping precinct. Terendak was of substantial size and covered several square miles with its southwestern border being the Straits of Malacca

Construction and occupation of Terendak was completed by August 1962, with the Brigade in place in its entirety. This brought all units of the Brigade together and under one roof.

During the 1960s elements of the Brigade, either units or components of units would be detached for short periods from 28th Commonwealth Infantry Brigade Group to other commands or formations for operations in Peninsular Malaysia, Singapore, Borneo or South Vietnam.

From 1970 due to the changing winds of politics in London and Canberra the Brigade started to wind down and units were either disbanded or moved to other locations and on 31 October 1971 the Brigade ceased to exist when it relocated to Singapore and was renamed 28 ANZUK Infantry Brigade on 1 November 1971. Terendak was handed over to the Malaysian Army where it remains in use today.

== Commanders ==
Command of the brigade was shared by the three contributing nations, Australia, New Zealand and the United Kingdom.

Commander	Country	Dates
Brigadier P.N.M Moore, DSO, MC	United Kingdom	September 1955 to July 1958
Brigadier H.J Mogg, CBE, DSO	United Kingdom	July 1958 to November 1960
Brigadier F.G Hassett, DSO, MVO, OBE	Australia	November 1960 to October 1962
Brigadier R.B Dawson, CB, DSO	New Zealand	October 1962 to October 1964
Brigadier T.D.R McMeekin, OBE	United Kingdom	October 1964 to January 1967
Brigadier P.L Tancred, OBE	Australia	January 1967 to March 1969
Brigadier R.M Gurr, OBE	New Zealand	March 1969 to March 1971
Brigadier M.J.H Walsh, CB, DSO	United Kingdom	March 1971 to November 1971

== Order of battle ==
- Headquarters 28th Commonwealth Infantry Brigade
  - 28 Commonwealth Infantry Brigade Def and Emp PL
  - 28 Commonwealth Infantry Brigade Group LAD
  - 28 Commonwealth Brigade Group Signal Squadron (1956 to 1957)
  - 28 (Commonwealth) Signal Squadron (1957 to 1959)
  - 208 Signal Squadron (Commonwealth) (1959 to 1970)
- Artillery
  - Royal Artillery
    - 14th Light Regiment, Royal Artillery, Terendak (1968 to 1969)
      - Headquarters Battery
      - No 1 Battery
      - No 5 Battery
  - Royal Australian Artillery
    - 101st Battery (1959 to 1961)
    - 103rd Battery (1961 to 1963)
    - 102nd Battery (1964 to 1966)
    - 'A' Battery(1965–1967)
    - 107th Battery (1967 to 1969)
- Engineers
  - 11 Independent Field Squadron (1954 to 1970)
  - 410 Plant Troop (1954 to 1962)
- Medical
  - 16 Field Ambulance, Penang (c1957)
  - 16 Commonwealth Field Ambulance, Terandak (c1960's)
  - 103 Australian Army Dental Section
- Infantry
  - Australian Battalion
    - 2nd Battalion, Royal Australian Regiment (1956 to 1957)
    - 3rd Battalion, Royal Australian Regiment (1957 to 1959)
    - 1st Battalion, Royal Australian Regiment (1959 to 1960)
    - 2nd Battalion, Royal Australian Regiment (1961 to 1963)
    - 3rd Battalion, Royal Australian Regiment (1963 to 1965)
    - 4th Battalion, Royal Australian Regiment (1965 to 1967)
    - 8th Battalion, Royal Australian Regiment (1967 to 1969)
    - 1st Battalion, Royal Australian Regiment (1969 to 1971)
  - New Zealand Battalion
    - 1st Battalion, Royal New Zealand Infantry Regiment (1958 to 1959)
    - 2nd Battalion, Royal New Zealand Infantry Regiment (1959 to 1961)
    - 1st Battalion, Royal New Zealand Infantry Regiment (1961 to 1964)
    - 1st Battalion, Royal New Zealand Infantry Regiment (1964 to 1971)
  - British Battalion
    - 1st Battalion, Royal Scots Fusiliers (1954 to 1956)
    - 1st Battalion, Royal Lincolnshire Regiment (1955 to 1958)
    - 1st Battalion, The Loyal Regiment (North Lancashire) (1957 to 1959)
    - 1st Battalion, 3rd East Anglian Regiment (16th/44th Foot) (1959 to 1961)
    - 1st Battalion, King's Own Yorkshire Light Infantry (1961 to 1964)
    - 1st Battalion, Scots Guards (1964 to 1966)
    - 1st Battalion, King's Shropshire Light Infantry (1967 to 1968)
    - 3rd Battalion, The Light Infantry (1968 to Apr 1969)
- Transport
  - 3 Squadron Royal Army Service Corps, Ipoh & Terandak (1952 to 1965)
  - 3 Squadron Royal Corps of Transport, Terandak (1965 to 1969)
- Ordnance
  - 28 Brigade Ordnance Field Park, Taiping (c1957)
  - 28 Commonwealth Brigade Ordnance Field Park, Terandak (c1960's)
- Workshop
  - 2 Infantry Workshop, Taiping & Terandak (1955 to 1970)
- Military Police
  - 28th Commonwealth Infantry Brigade Provost Unit
- Pay
  - 257 Field Cash Office
- Postal
  - 368 Postal Unit Royal Engineers, Terendak

Preceded by 28th Commonwealth Infantry Brigade	28th Commonwealth Infantry Brigade Group; 1955–1971	Succeeded by 28 ANZUK Infantry Brigade
