= ANZUK =

- Active: 1 November 1971 – 31 January 1974
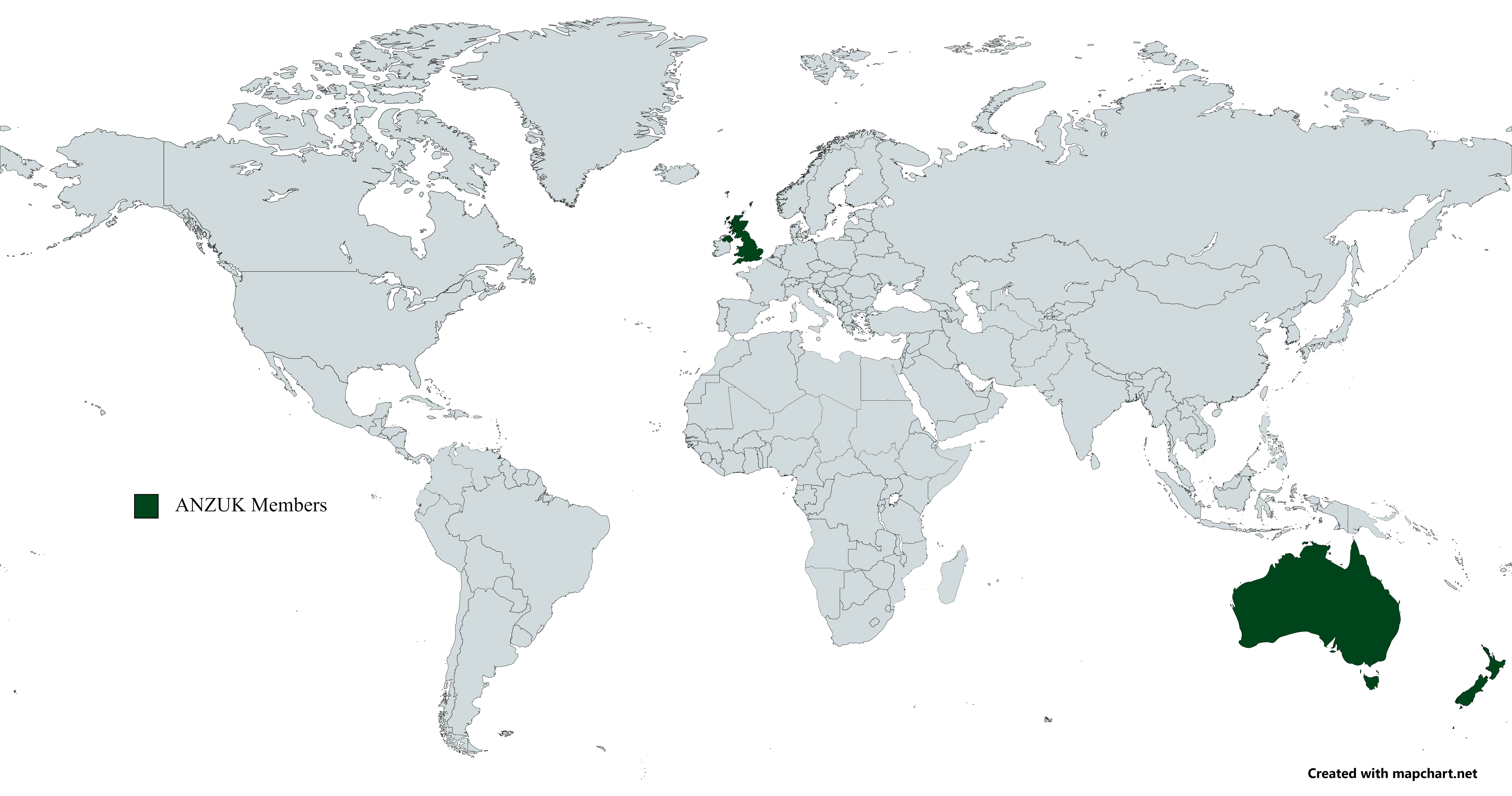
- Country: Members countries of ANZUK: Australia; New Zealand; United Kingdom
- Garrison/HQ: Singapore

Commanders
- Notable commanders: Rear Admiral David Wells; Air Vice Marshal Richard Gordon Wakeford

Insignia
- Flag of ANZUK

ANZUK was a tripartite force formed by Australia, New Zealand, and the United Kingdom to defend the Asian Pacific region after the United Kingdom withdrew forces from the east of Suez in the early 1970s. The ANZUK force was formed in Singapore on 1 November 1971 under Rear Admiral David Wells and disbanded on 31 January 1974.

== ANZUK order of battle ==
ANZUK initially consisted of the following major units:

=== ANZUK Force HQ ===
- 9 ANZUK Signal Regiment: Under command of the Royal Australian Corps of Signals, 9th (ANZUK) Signal Regiment task was to support the ANZUK Force, which in 1970 had replaced the British Forces Headquarters and Installations in Singapore. this joint service, multi national regiment took over, as going concerns, the Royal Navy Transmitter Stations at Suara, and the Royal Navy Receiver Station Kranji. The regiment employed New Zealand and British Army, Navy and Air Force Personnel together with locally enlisted Singaporean, British, New Zealand and Australian civilian technicians and communication specialists. In addition there was operational control of a group of Malaysian Navy communicators, which were to interface the force with the Malaysian Navy.
- ANZUK Traffic Management Agency (ATMA)
- ANZUK Intelligence and Security Unit
- 65 Ground Liaison Section
- ANZUK Provost Unit

=== Naval component ===
- Two Royal Navy frigates
- Royal Australian Navy frigate
- Royal New Zealand Navy frigate
- Royal Navy or Royal Australian Navy submarine

=== Land Component ===
The land component of ANZUK Force was the units of 28th Commonwealth Infantry Brigade Group renamed and relocated from Malaysia to Singapore.

==== 28th ANZUK Brigade ====
Brigade Commanders of 28 ANZUK Brigade were:

- Brigadier Michael Walsh 1971–1972
- Brigadier Michael Kennedy 1972–1974

Units that constituted 28 ANZUK Brigade were:

- 28 (ANZUK) Brigade HQ and Signal Squadron
- 6th Battalion, Royal Australian Regiment, Kangaw Barracks
- 1st Battalion Royal New Zealand Infantry Regiment, Dieppe Barracks
- 1st Battalion Royal Highland Fusiliers, Meerut Barracks
- 28th ANZUK Field Regiment,
  - Combined Australian/British HQ Battery
  - 1st Battery Royal Artillery "The Blazers"
  - 106th Field Battery, Royal Australian Artillery
  - 161 Battery Royal New Zealand Artillery (1972 only)
- 28 ANZUK Field Squadron
- 28 ANZUK Aviation Squadron
  - 182 Reconnaissance Flight Australian Army Air Corps (two helicopters),
  - No. 656 Squadron Army Air Corps (one flight): was the Royal Engineers Air Troop, moved and rebadged from Jungle Warfare School, Kota Tinggi, Johore

==== ANZUK Support Group ====
===== Transport Element =====
- Commander Royal Australian Army Service Corps (CRAASC) and staff
- ANZUK Base Transport Unit
  - Headquarters Base Transport Unit
  - Base Transport Platoon
  - Base Coach Platoon
  - Field Platoon
    - 90 Transport Platoon, RAASC
    - 402 Troop, Royal Corps of Transport
  - BTU Workshops
- ANZUK Supply Depot
- ANZUK Postal & Courier Communications Unit.

===== Ordnance Element =====
- ANZUK Ordnance Depot: To support the Land Army component of the ANZUK Force, the ANZUK Ordnance Depot was established from the existing Australian/New Zealand 5 Advanced Ordnance Depot. Located in the premises vacated by the Royal Navy Victualling Depot on the dockside at Sembawang Naval Base. Ordnance support to ANZUK Force was based upon an integrated supply service manned by service personnel from the RAOC, RAAOC and RNZAOC with locally employed civilians (LEC) performing the basic clerical, warehousing and driving tasks. ANZUK Ordnance Depot was constituted of the following elements:
  - Stores Sub Depot
  - Vehicle Sub Depot
  - Ammunition Sub Depot
  - Barrack Services Unit

===== Workshop Element =====
- ANZUK Area Workshops, Kangaw Barracks

=== Air Component ===
- No. 3 Squadron RAAF – Dassault Mirage III
- No. 41 Squadron RNZAF – Bristol Freighter and Bell UH-1H Iroquois
- No. 75 Squadron RAAF – Dassault Mirage III
- No. 103 Squadron RAF – Westland Whirlwind (later Westland Wessex) helicopters
- No. 205 Squadron RAF – Avro Shackleton

== Dress distinctions ==
Contributing nations wore their individual national uniforms with the addition of the following identifying patches;

- ANZUK Headquarters and Support elements:
- 28 ANZUK Brigade Units:
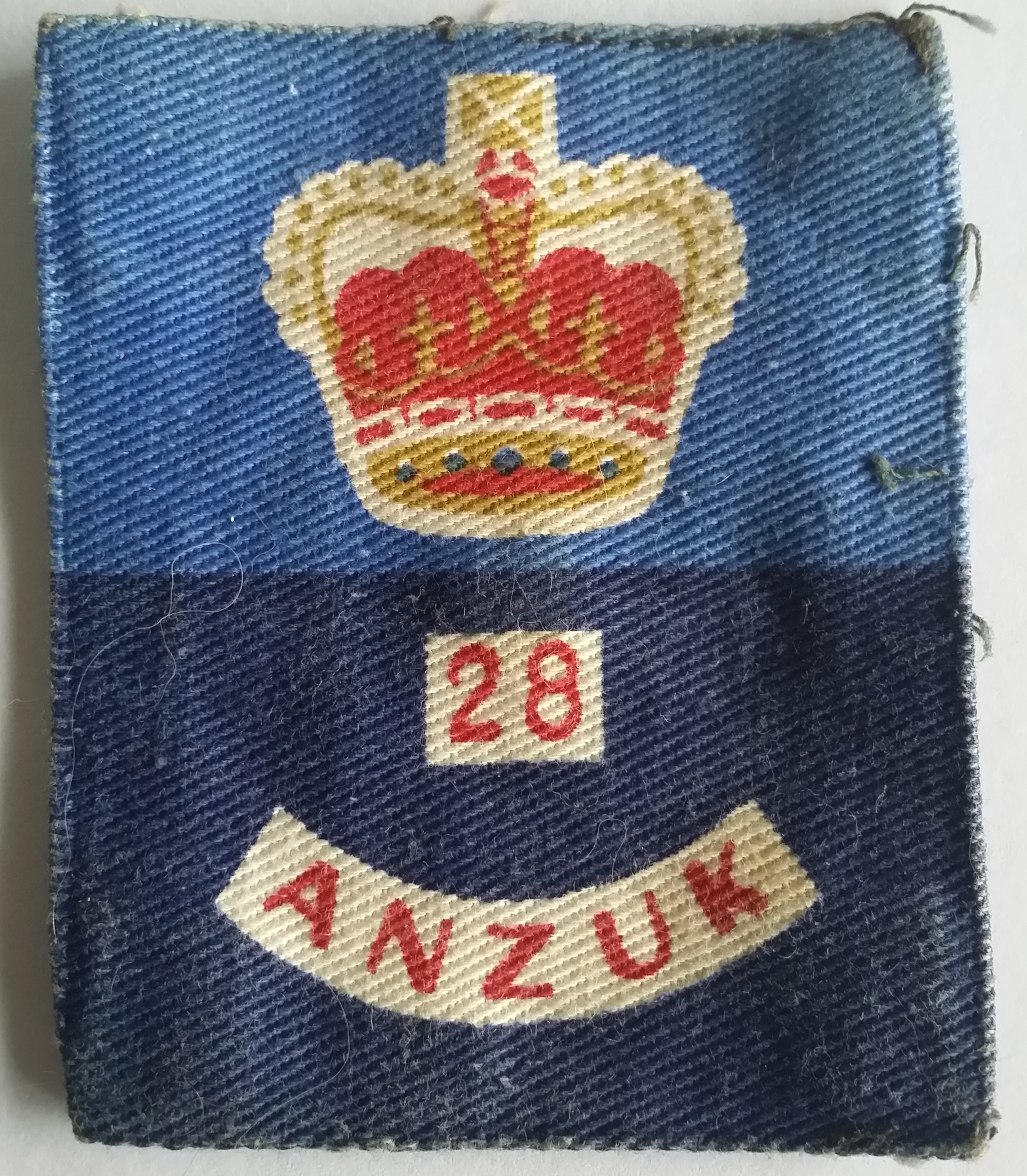
  28 ANZUK Brigade Patch

Sea and Air components did not wear any of the patches as they remained under national command and were only attached to NZUK command on an as required basis.

== Disbandment ==
By 1973 the political climate in Australia and the United Kingdom had changed and it was deemed that ANZUK should be disbanded. Rear Admiral Wells, the First ANZUK commander who established the Force, had the task of planning the run-down phase and handing over to his successor Air Vice Marshal Richard Gordon Wakeford, to follow through.

Australia would be retaining a presence in Butterworth in Malaysia and the United Kingdom had decided to withdraw all its forces east of Suez. It was in New Zealand's interest to retain a force in southeast Asia, so on 30 January 1974 New Zealand Force South East Asia was formed, taking under its command all the New Zealand units formerly part of ANZUK.

Over the course of 1974 the integrated units which made up the ANZUK were gradually disbanded and replaced by national units. On 31 January 1974 ceased to exist, followed on 16 December 1974 with the disbanding of the Naval and Air Headquarters and their assets reverted to their respective national command and what remained of the United Kingdom's land component forces became the 28th (UK) Infantry Brigade.

Taking several years for the Australian and United Kingdom units to draw down and withdraw, it was not until 1977 that NZFORSEA was the sole remaining foreign presence in Singapore.

== See also ==
- ABCA Armies (the American, British, Canadian, Australian and New Zealand Armies' Program) optimises interoperability
- Five Power Defence Arrangements (signed in 1971) between Australia, Malaysia, New Zealand, Singapore and the United Kingdom (all Commonwealth members)
