= Structure of the New Zealand Army =

This article describes the current structure of the New Zealand Army. It includes the army's order of battle and the headquarters locations of major units.

New Zealand Army soldiers with NZLAVs during an exercise in 2009

== History ==
From the 1880s, the structure of the army has evolved with changing defence needs and financial constraints. New Zealand deployed a division jointly with Australia at the beginning of the First World War, eventually despatching personnel to fill out a full division. Five divisions (three attenuated at home in NZ, the 1st, 4th, and 5th) were raised during the Second World War. A division was initially raised through Compulsory Military Training from 1949.

Damien Marc Fenton's A False Sense of Security? outlines parts of the army's structural evolution since the Second World War. The Army had had three military districts, Northern Military District at Auckland, Central Military District at Palmerston North, and Southern Military District at Christchurch in 1946. The New Zealand Division was disestablished in 1961. In 1963, a Combat Brigade Group (1st Brigade), Combat Reserve Brigade Group (3rd Brigade), and Logistic Support Force (formed from the former 2nd Infantry Brigade Group) were established, each to be based on a district HQ. On 1 September 1970, two formations, Home Command and Field Force Command, were established to administer the home base and deployable forces respectively.

In 1978, Land Forces Command (New Zealand) emerged, replacing Home Command and Field Force Command, and the two operational brigades at the time, 1 and 3 Brigades, were disbanded and replaced by Task Force Regions, at Papakura, Palmerston North, and Christchurch. Still later on after the 1983 Defence Review Land Forces Command was split into Land Force Command at Takapuna and Support Command at Palmerston North. Support Command later moved to Trentham.

A skeleton listing of New Zealand Army units, grouped under Land Force Command and Support Command and seemingly circa 1984, can be seen at Desmond Ball's The Anzac Connection. Land Force Command included two Task Force headquarters at Papakura and Christchurch; 16th Field Regiment, Royal New Zealand Artillery at Papakura; 3rd Field Regiment Royal New Zealand Artillery at Burnham, a Territorial Force unit; a Territorial Force medium battery at Hamilton with BL 5.5-inch medium guns; an artillery locating troop at Waiouru; two squadrons with Scorpion Combat Vehicle Reconnaissance (Tracked) vehicles at Waiouru and Hamilton; an APC squadron (both RF and TF) at Burnham; a TF anti-armour squadron in Dunedin; two field engineer squadrons; four signals squadrons; the Special Air Service Group; and eight infantry battalions of the Royal New Zealand Infantry Regiment, the 1st Battalion, a regular unit at Dieppe Barracks, Sembawang, Singapore; the 2/1 Battalion, a regular unit at Burnham Camp; and six territorial battalions, four in the North Island and two in the South Island. There were also a number of Royal New Zealand Corps of Transport (a total of three regiments, split between Land Force Command and Support Command), a terminal squadron, two field ambulances, a field hospital, two supply companies, and workshops units, a Mobile Dental Unit, and an intelligence centre at Papakura.

Units assigned to 1 Task Force Region in Auckland circa 1982 appear to have included 16 Field Regiment; 3 and 6 Battalions RNZIR; 4 Medium Battery in Hamilton; 1 Transport Regiment; 1 Signal Squadron; 1 Field Workshops; 1 Field Ambulance; 1 TFR Light Aid Detachment RNZEME (vehicle mechanics); 1 Mobile Dental Unit; 1 Field Hospital; 1 Support Company; 1 MP Platoon; the TFR HQ Company; the Auckland University Medical Corps, and the Papakura and Ngaruawahia camp headquarters.

Support Command and Army Training Group had a large number of other units and corps schools.

The two commands were joined once again at Trentham as Land Command after 1998, which in 2001 was amalgamated with the other services' operational headquarters to form Headquarters Joint Forces New Zealand.

== Structure ==
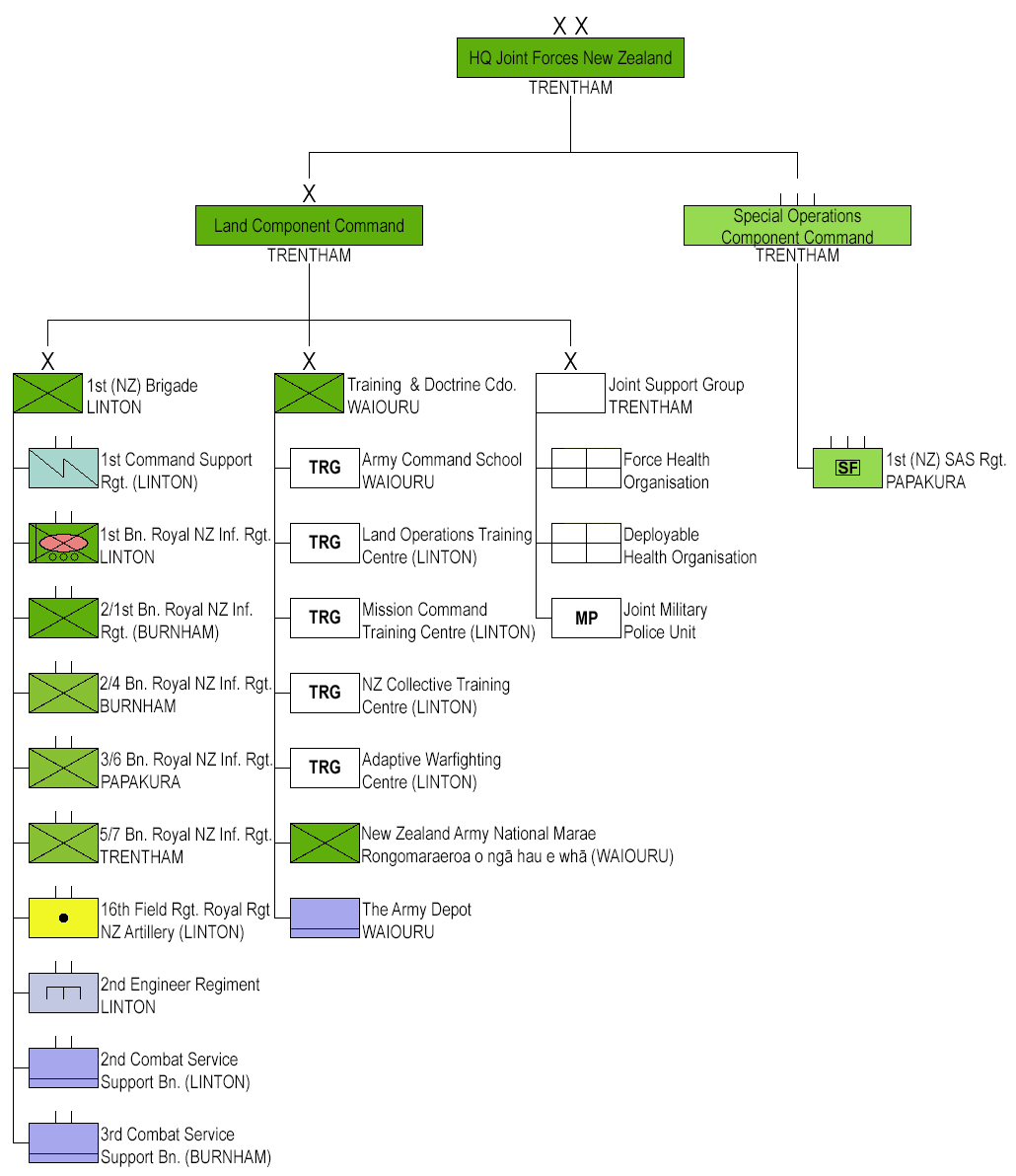
New Zealand Army organization December 2025

The 1st Brigade was formed on 13 December 2011 by amalgamating the units of the 2nd Land Force Group and 3rd Land Force Group. It is effectively a 'shopping basket' of units which can be raised in readiness preparatory to an operational deployment, and does not have any operational deployment role.

Headquarters Deployable Joint Task Force-Land (HQ DJTF-L) was formed by redesignating the headquarters of the 3rd Land Force Group in late 2011. It was expected that the headquarters would move to Linton Military Camp in the Manawatū after December 2012. As of 1 January 2013, it was announced that the headquarters was to be redesignated HQ Deployable Joint Interagency Task Force (DJIATF) and be moved under the command of Headquarters Joint Forces New Zealand. In late 2014 Colonel John Howard handed over command to Colonel Glenn King; by August 2018 Navy Captain Garin Golding was in command, though promised the command of the new HMNZS Aotearoa.

The Special Operations Component Command contains Army units, but is responsive to Commander Joint Forces New Zealand and the Chief of Defence Force.

The New Zealand Army's structure as of 1 December 2025 is as follows:

=== Chief of Army ===
==== Army HQ ====
===== Army General Staff =====
- Army Delivery
- Army Strategy
- Army Training
- Corporate Support
- National Army Museum

==== Land Component Command ====
===== 1st (New Zealand) Brigade =====
- Headquarters, 1st (New Zealand) Brigade (Linton Military Camp)
  - 1st Command Support Regiment (Linton Military Camp), Royal New Zealand Corps of Signals
    - 1st (New Zealand) Military Intelligence Company
    - 2nd (New Zealand) Military Intelligence Company
    - 1st Signal Squadron (Army Reserves)
    - 2nd Signal Squadron
    - 5th Signal Squadron
    - Military Network Operations and Security Centre
  - 1st Battalion, Royal New Zealand Infantry Regiment (Linton Military Camp)
    - Queen Alexandra's Company
    - Victor Company
    - Whiskey Company
    - Support Company
    - Combat Service Support Company
    - Waikato Mounted Rifles
  - 2/1st Battalion, Royal New Zealand Infantry Regiment (Burnham Camp)
    - Alpha Company
    - Bravo Company
    - Delta Company
    - Support Company
    - Depot Company
    - Combat Service Support Company
  - 2nd/4th Battalion, (Reserve) Royal New Zealand Infantry Regiment (Burnham Camp)
    - Canterbury Company
    - Otago and Southland Company
    - Nelson, Marlborough and West Coast Company
  - 3rd/6th Battalion, (Reserve) Royal New Zealand Infantry Regiment (Papakura Military Camp)
    - Auckland Company (Auckland)
    - Hauraki Company (Tauranga)
    - Northland Company (Whangarei)
  - 5th/7th Battalion, (Reserve) Royal New Zealand Infantry Regiment (Trentham Military Camp)
    - East Coast Company (Napier)
    - Wellington Company (Wellington)
    - West Coast Company (Whanganui)
  - 16th Field Regiment, Royal Regiment of New Zealand Artillery (Linton Military Camp)
    - 161 Battery
    - 163 Battery
    - 11/4 Battery (Army Reserves)
    - Combat Service Support troop
  - 2nd Engineer Regiment, Royal New Zealand Engineers (Linton Military Camp)
    - 2nd Field Squadron
    - 3rd Field and Emergency Response Squadron (Burnham Camp)
    - 25 Engineer Support Squadron
  - 2nd Combat Service Support Battalion, Royal New Zealand Army Logistic Regiment (Linton Military Camp)
    - 2nd Workshop Company
    - 5th Movements Company
    - 10th Transport Company
    - 21st Supply Company
    - Combat Service Support Company (North)
    - 38th Combat Service Support Company (Army Reserves)
  - 3rd Combat Service Support Battalion, Royal New Zealand Army Logistic Regiment (Burnham Camp)
    - 3rd Transport Company
    - 3rd Catering & Supply Company
    - 3rd Workshop Company
    - 3rd Active Reserve Company (Army Reserves)

===== Army training group =====
- Army Command School
  - Officer Cadet School (New Zealand)
  - Non Commissioned Officer School
  - Army Leadership Centre (Burnham Camp)
- Land Operations Training Centre (Linton Military Camp)
  - School of Artillery (Linton Military Camp)
  - School of Military Engineering (Linton Military Camp)
  - Combat School (Linton Military Camp)
  - Trade Training School (Trentham Military Camp)
  - Logistics Operations School (Linton Military Camp)
  - Defence Driver Training School (Linton Military Camp)
- Mission Command Training Centre (Linton Military Camp)
  - Tactical School (Linton Military Camp)
  - School of Signals (Linton Military Camp)
  - School of Military Intelligence and Security (Linton Military Camp)
  - Command and Control Systems School
  - Personnel and Command Support School
  - Training and Environment Support Cell
- The Army Depot (Waiouru Military Camp)
- New Zealand Army National Marae - Rongomaraeroa o ngā hau e whā (Waiouru Military Camp)

===== Joint Support Group =====
- Deployable Health Organisation
  - Northern Health Support Squadron
  - Central Health Support Squadron
  - General Health Support Squadron
  - Southern Health Support Squadrn
  - Logistics Support Squadron
- Force Health Organisation
  - Northern Region
  - Southern Region
  - Defence Health Centres
  - Dental Squadron
  - Physical Performance Squadron
  - Quality and Improvements
- Joint Military Police Unit
  - Provost Squadron
  - Serious Investigation Branch Squadron
  - Military Police School
  - Services Correction Establishment

===== Regional Support (Army) =====
- Waiouru Regional Support Centre
- Linton Regional Support Centre
- Trentham Regional Support
- Centre
- Southern Regional Support Centre
- Special Operations Component
- Command
- NZ Army Band

==== Special Operations Component Command ====
- Special Operations Component Command (Trentham Military Camp)
  - 1st New Zealand Special Air Service Regiment (Papakura Military Camp)
    - A Squadron
    - B Squadron
    - E Squadron (EOD)
    - Support Squadron
    - Special Operations Training Centre
    - Reserve Squadron
