= Light Aid Detachment =

A Light Aid Detachment is an attached independent minor unit of the Royal Electrical and Mechanical Engineers, Royal Canadian Electrical and Mechanical Engineers, Royal Australian Electrical and Mechanical Engineers, or Royal New Zealand Army Logistic Regiment operating as a sub-unit of the supported unit. These units provide dedicated logistic support to every field unit of the Australian Army, British Army, Canadian Army or New Zealand Army. RAEME, REME, RCEME and the NZEME were created in October 1942 out of elements of the Royal Australian Army Ordnance Corps, Royal Army Ordnance Corps, Royal Engineers, Royal Corps of Signals, Royal Army Service Corps Royal Canadian Ordnance Corps and the New Zealand Ordnance Corps who previously handled functions such as the repair of weapons, optics and vehicles.

In the RCEME LADs were divisions of larger units known as Workshops. In the British Army the title Workshop (Wksp) is used both for major REME units (Field for Brigades or Armoured for Divisions) and for those minor units which provide some 2nd Line support to the parent regiment. The term LAD is therefore restricted to only those minor REME units which solely provide 1st Line support, typically this is Armour and Infantry units. REME minor units supporting RA, R Signals, RE, RLC etc. are normally titled as Wksp as they also provide some degree of 2nd line support to the parent unit.

Typically composed of around 60-80 personnel they are attached to a host battalion. Typical field deployment would split the LAD/Wksp into a regimental "B Echelon" contingent of about 30 men and 4 "fitter sections" of about 7-12 men, each of which is attached to a company/squadron. The fitter sections are part of the A Echelon HQ of the company/squadron. This average configuration does, of course, vary widely dependent on the parent unit and their equipment.
