= Corps of Military Police =

Corps of Military Police may refer to:

- Royal Australian Corps of Military Police
- Corps of Military Police (India)
- Corps of Indian Military Police, in British India
- Corps of Royal New Zealand Military Police
- Sri Lanka Corps of Military Police
- The former name of the Royal Military Police of the British Army
- Pakistan Army Corps of Military Police

== See also ==
- Military Police Corps (disambiguation)
