= 3rd Artillery Regiment =

3rd Artillery Regiment may refer to:

== Italy ==
- 3rd Anti-Aircraft Artillery Regiment "Firenze"
- 3rd Artillery Regiment "Pistoia"
- 3rd Field Artillery Regiment (Mountain)
- 3rd Heavy Artillery Regiment "Volturno"
- 3rd Targeting Support Regiment "Bondone"

== United Kingdom ==
- 3rd Regiment Royal Horse Artillery
- III Brigade, Royal Horse Artillery
- III Brigade, Royal Horse Artillery (T.F.)
- 3rd (Ulster) Searchlight Regiment, Royal Artillery
- 3rd Middlesex Artillery Volunteers
- 3rd West Lancashire Artillery

== United States ==
- 3rd Air Defense Artillery Regiment
- 3rd Field Artillery Regiment (United States)
- 3rd Continental Artillery Regiment
- 3rd Massachusetts Heavy Artillery Regiment
- 3rd Pennsylvania Heavy Artillery Regiment
- 3rd Rhode Island Heavy Artillery Regiment
- 3rd United States Colored Heavy Artillery Regiment

== Other countries ==
- 3rd Field Artillery Regiment (Canada)
- 3rd Medium Regiment, Royal Canadian Artillery
- 3rd Field Artillery Regiment (Denmark)
- 3rd Marine Artillery Regiment (France)
- 3rd Field Regiment, Royal New Zealand Artillery
