= Support Command =

Support Command may refer to:

- Support Command (Albania)
- Support Command (New Zealand)
- Support Command (British Army)
- RAF Support Command
- RAAF Support Command
- United States Army Combined Arms Support Command
