= List of New Zealand Army Corps =

A corps in the New Zealand Army is an administrative group that comprises members of similar work functions.

== Corps ==
=== Current ===
The following is a list of the Corps of the New Zealand Army, ordered according to the traditional seniority of all the Corps.

- New Zealand Corps of Officer Cadets
- Royal Regiment of New Zealand Artillery
- Royal New Zealand Armoured Corps
- The Corps of Royal New Zealand Engineers
- Royal New Zealand Corps of Signals
- Royal New Zealand Infantry Regiment
- The New Zealand Special Air Service
- New Zealand Intelligence Corps
- Royal New Zealand Army Logistic Regiment
- Royal New Zealand Army Medical Corps
- Royal New Zealand Dental Corps
- Royal New Zealand Chaplains Department
- New Zealand Army Legal Service
- Royal New Zealand Army Education Corps
- The Corps of Royal New Zealand Military Police
- Royal New Zealand Nursing Corps
- New Zealand Army Physical Training Corps

=== Disbanded ===
- New Zealand Staff Corps
- New Zealand Permanent Staff
- Submarine Mining Volunteers and Torpedo Corps
- New Zealand Railway Corps
- New Zealand Post and Telegraph Corps
- New Zealand Cyclist Corps
- New Zealand Machine Gun Corps
- New Zealand Army Air Corps
- New Zealand Veterinary Corps
- Royal New Zealand Army Service Corps
- Royal New Zealand Corps of Transport
- New Zealand Army Ordnance Corps
- Royal New Zealand Army Ordnance Corps
- Royal New Zealand Electrical and Mechanical Engineers
- New Zealand Army Pay Corps
- Royal New Zealand Provost Corps
- Royal Woman's New Zealand Army Corps
