= New Zealand Scottish Regiment =

- Active: 1939–2013
- Country: New Zealand
- Branch: New Zealand Army
- Type: Infantry (1939–1943); Armoured reconnaissance (1948–2013)
- Motto: Mo rich mo dhuthaich (Scottish Gaelic: My king my country)
- March: Highland Laddie

Commanders
- Colonel-in-Chief: Queen Elizabeth The Queen Mother

Insignia
- Tartan: Black Watch

The New Zealand Scottish Regiment was a regiment of the New Zealand Army. It was formed in 1939 as an infantry regiment and raised two battalions during the Second World War. Although the 1st Battalion was sent overseas during the war as part of the 3rd Division, it never saw combat. The regiment was reformed in 1948 as a reconnaissance regiment of the Royal New Zealand Armoured Corps, but by the 1960s had been reduced to two independent squadrons. Various armoured vehicles were utilised by the regiment including Daimler Dingo Scout Cars, Daimler Armoured Cars, Ferret armoured cars and M113a1 armoured personnel carriers. The regiment was eventually disbanded in 2013.

== History ==
=== Formation ===
During the late nineteenth century, various Scottish volunteer units had been formed in New Zealand. Their Scottish identity, however, disappeared when they were absorbed into the newly formed territorial regiments in 1911. A proposal to form a New Zealand Scottish regiment during the First World War was made to the minister of defence, but was declined. A new proposal was made by the Dunedin Scottish Society in 1937 and gained support from numerous Caledonian societies throughout New Zealand. The proposal was eventually accepted and the New Zealand Scottish Regiment was formed on 19 January 1939.

The new regiment was established with a 135-man company based in each of Auckland, Wellington, Christchurch and Dunedin. New recruits had to have been either born in Scotland or have Scottish heritage, however this was not always strictly enforced and the regiment would include men of Chinese and Māori Heritage. Recruitment was rapid and by July 1939 the regiment was at full strength. The popularity of the regiment had resulted in a large waiting list and the formation of a fifth company (also to be based in Dunedin) was investigated, but never eventuated. Highland Uniforms were acquired from Black Watch stores in Scotland and Queen Elizabeth The Queen Mother, who was Colonel-in-Chief of the Black Watch, was also appointed Colonel-in-Chief of the New Zealand Scottish Regiment.

=== Second World War ===
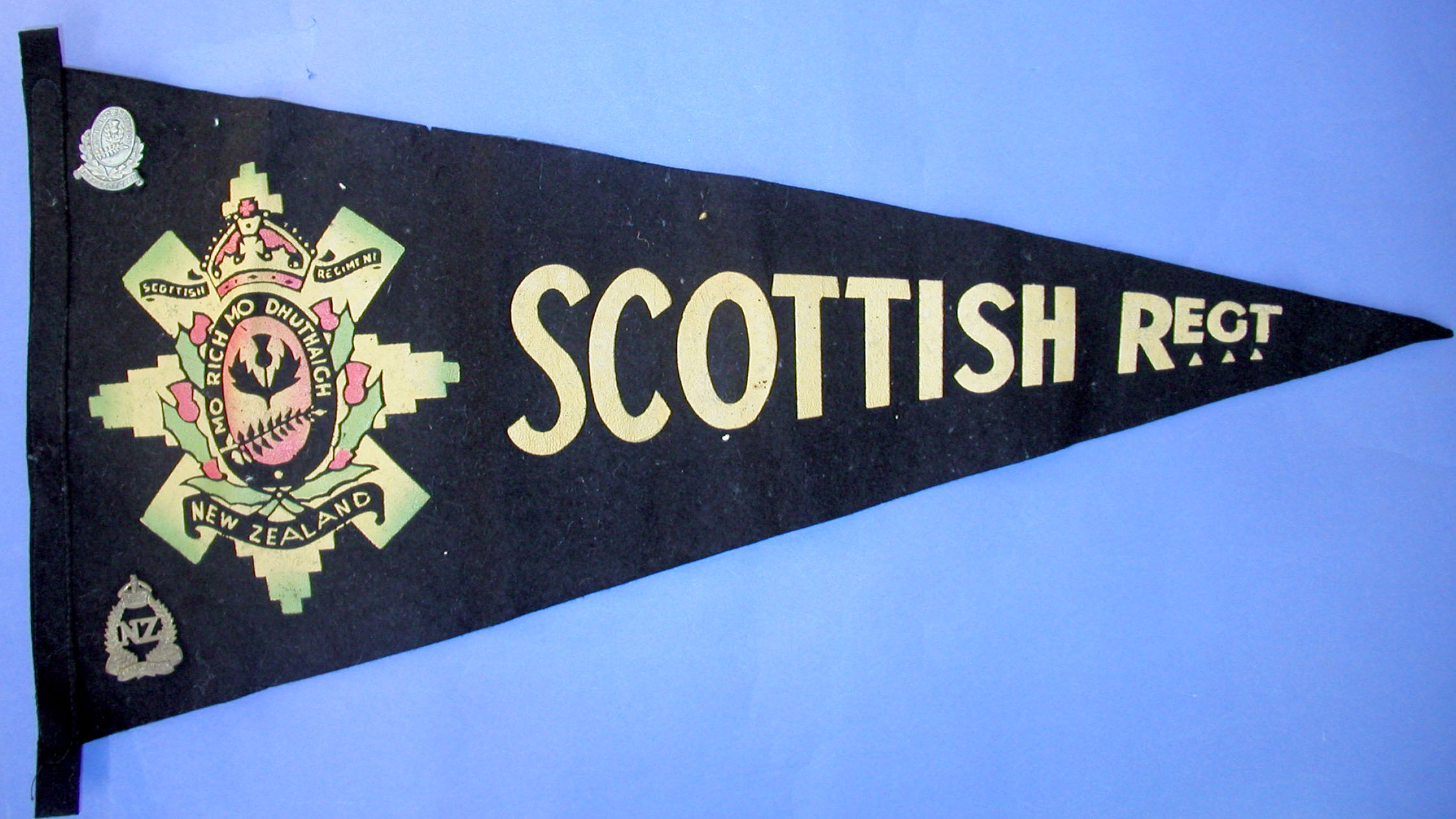
New Zealand Scottish Regiment WW2 pennant

At the outbreak of the Second World War in September 1939, the New Zealand Scottish Regiment requested to be sent overseas but this was initially declined. Men from he regiment would instead be posted to D Company of 27th (Machine Gun) Battalion, and the Otago and Southland Company of 26th Battalion.

In October 1940, the Christchurch and Dunedin companies became a composite battalion along with a company of engineers and a company of signallers. The two Scottish companies were detached in January 1941 and expanded to battalion strength. The battalion was titled 2nd Battalion, New Zealand Scottish Regiment (even though no first battalion had yet been formed). A further two companies were raised, with one based in Invercargill and the other in Oamaru. The companies of the 2nd battalion trained together for three months and were then dispersed back to their home locations. A second Wellington company was raised in January 1941 and the North Island companies came together to form the 1st Battalion in December 1941. The 1st battalion was based in Featherston as part of 7th Brigade, 4th Division. The 2nd battalion was brought back together in March 1942 and became part of 10th Brigade, 5th Division, based in Ashburton.

In September 1942 it was announced that the 1st Battalion would be sent overseas to join the 3rd Division in the Pacific. The Battalion departed New Zealand in late December and arrived in New Caledonia on 1 January 1943. The 1st Battalion became part of 15th Brigade, however due to manpower shortages, the 15th Brigade and its constituent units were disbanded on 1 July 1943. The 1st Battalion never saw combat and its constituent manpower was redistributed to other units of the 2nd and 3rd Divisions, and the Royal New Zealand Air Force. A general stand-down was ordered in New Zealand at this time and the 2nd Battalion was also disbanded.

=== Post-war ===
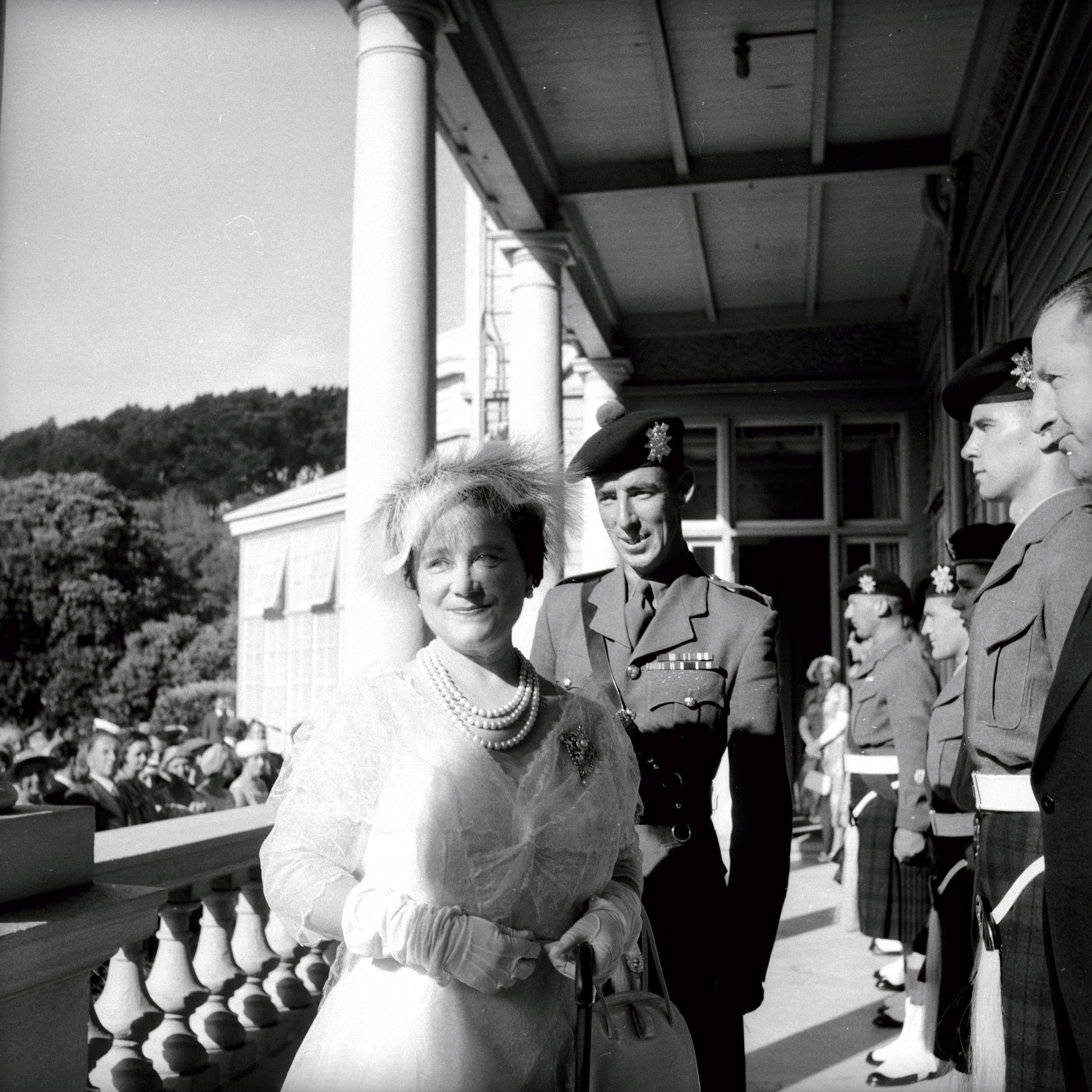
Queen Elizabeth The Queen Mother visiting members of the 1st Armoured Car Regiment (New Zealand Scottish) at Government House, 1958

Although the regiment continued to exist on paper, it was not re-established until 1948, with many former members reenlisting. The regiment was now part of the Royal New Zealand Armoured Corps and redesignated as 1st Divisional Regiment (New Zealand Scottish). One squadron was based in each of Auckland, Wellington, Christchurch and Dunedin, with the regimental HQ also in Wellington. The role of the regiment was not initially defined, but in 1950 it was clarified that the regiment would carry out reconnaissance duties. The regiment was equipped with Daimler Dingo Scout Cars and Daimler Armoured Cars and its title was changed to 1st Armoured Car Regiment (New Zealand Scottish).

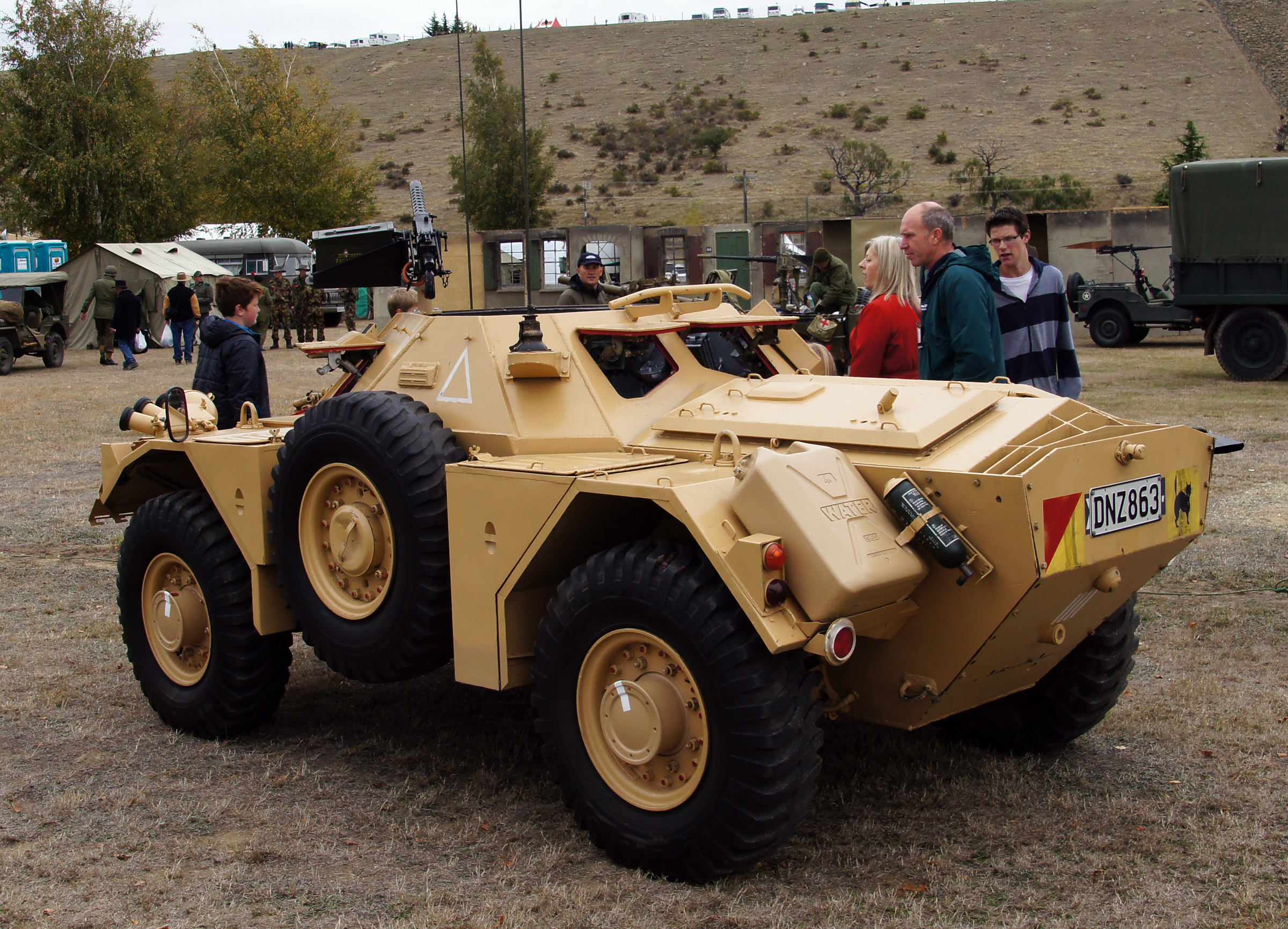
A Ferret armoured car

The Auckland Squadron was disbanded in 1961 and the Daimlers were replaced with Ferret armoured cars in 1962. A further reorganisation saw the Wellington Squadron and the regimental headquarters disbanded in 1963. The remaining Christchurch and Dunedin based squadrons were then retitled as 1st and 2nd Reconnaissance Squadrons (New Zealand Scottish), respectively.

A reorganisation occurred in 1970 and the two squadrons were retitled as 1st and 2nd Squadrons (New Zealand Scottish). They were reequipt with M113a1 armoured personnel carriers between 1970 and 1973 and became a composite unit of regular and territorial force soldiers. 1st Squadron became part of the Combat Brigade Group based in the North Island. However, only a single regular force troop would be based in Waiouru. The rest of the squadron was part of the territorial force, with only a small regular force cadre, and would remain in Christchurch. The 2nd Squadron became part of the Reserve Brigade Group based in the South Island and was part of the territorial force, but also had a small regular force cadre. Each squadron was expected to provide and an armoured personnel carrier lift capability for a single infantry company. In 1979 the regular force troop of 1st Squadron moved to Burnham, while a second regular force troop was raised as part of 2nd Squadron and took its place at Waiouru.

In late 1981, the 2nd Squadron was rerolled as an anti-armour squadron and equipped with 106mm recoilless rifles, mounted on land rovers. The 1st Squadron was disbanded in 1990 and the 2nd Squadron became New Zealand Scottish with the role of rear area security.

In July 1993, the Royal New Zealand Armoured Corps was reorganised. Queen Alexandra's Mounted Rifles was raised to regimental status (previously being a squadron) and the New Zealand Scottish became one of its territorial force wheeled reconnaissance squadrons. Later the regular force personnel were transferred to the Waikato/Wellington East Coast Squadron and the remaining territorial force personnel became part of the multi-functional 4th Otago and Southland Battalion Group. Initially the New Zealand Scottish existed within the battalion as a distinct company, but this was later reduced to a platoon and eventually disbanded with remaining personnel distributed throughout the battalion.

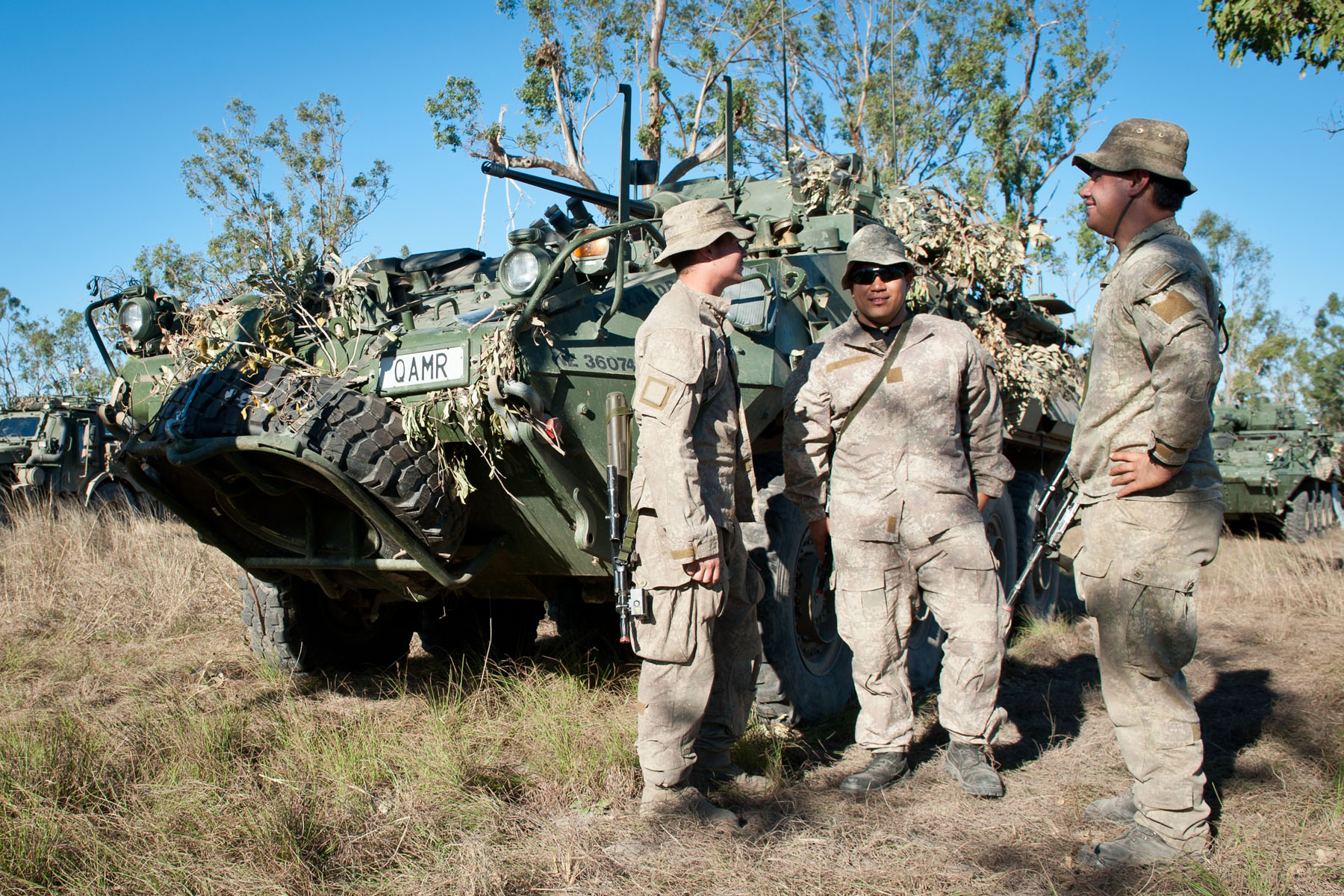
NZ Scots Squadron of Queen Alexandra's Mounted Rifles

The 4th Otago and Southland Battalion Group was amalgamated with the 2nd Canterbury, and Nelson-Marlborough and West Coast Battalion Group in 2012 to become 2nd/4th Battalion, Royal New Zealand Infantry Regiment in 2012. The New Zealand Scottish Regiment was formally disbanded in 2013, although the title and traditions of the regiment were transferred to the New Zealand Scottish Squadron of Queen Alexandra's Mounted Rifles.

== Colours and battle honours ==
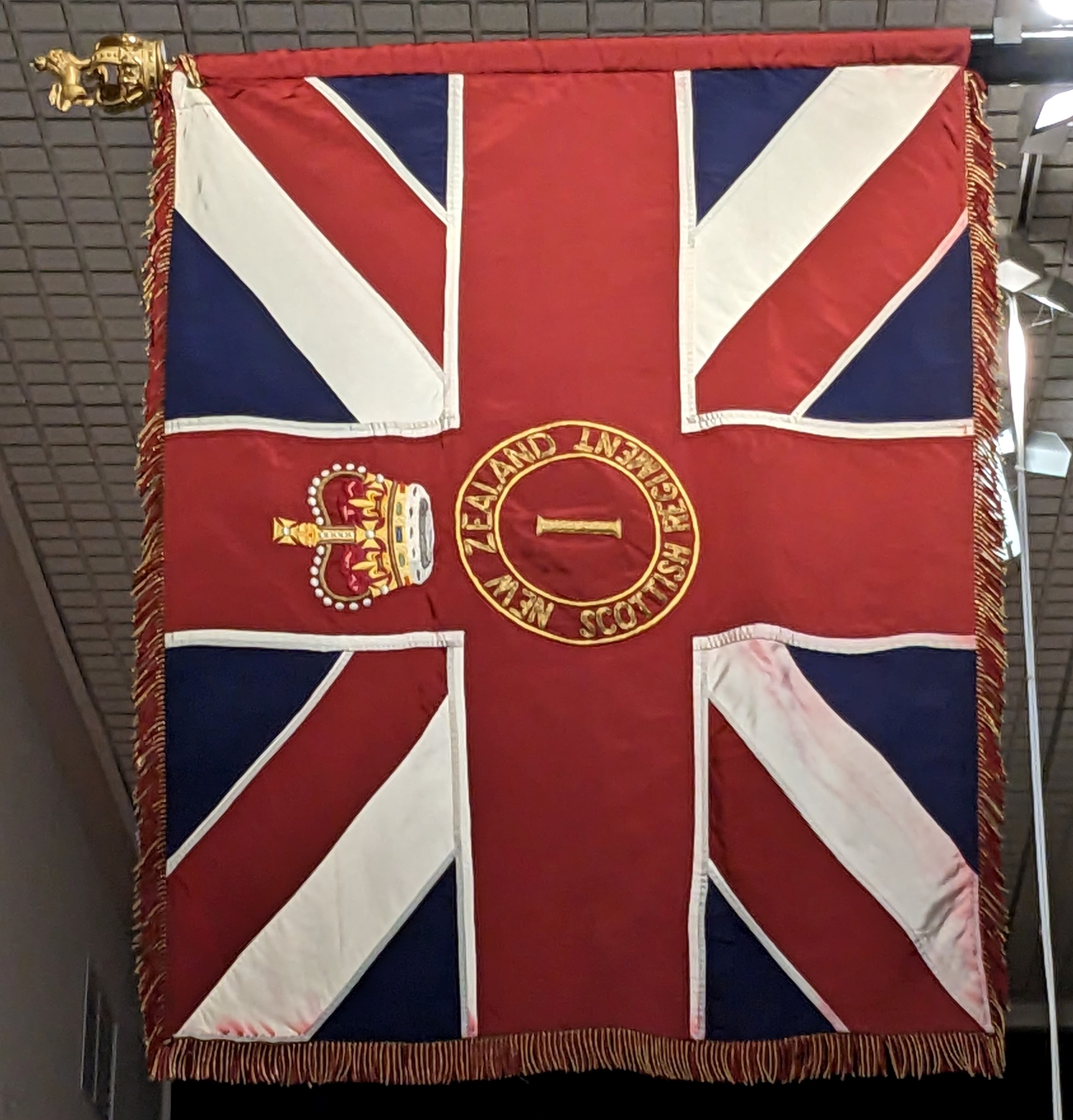
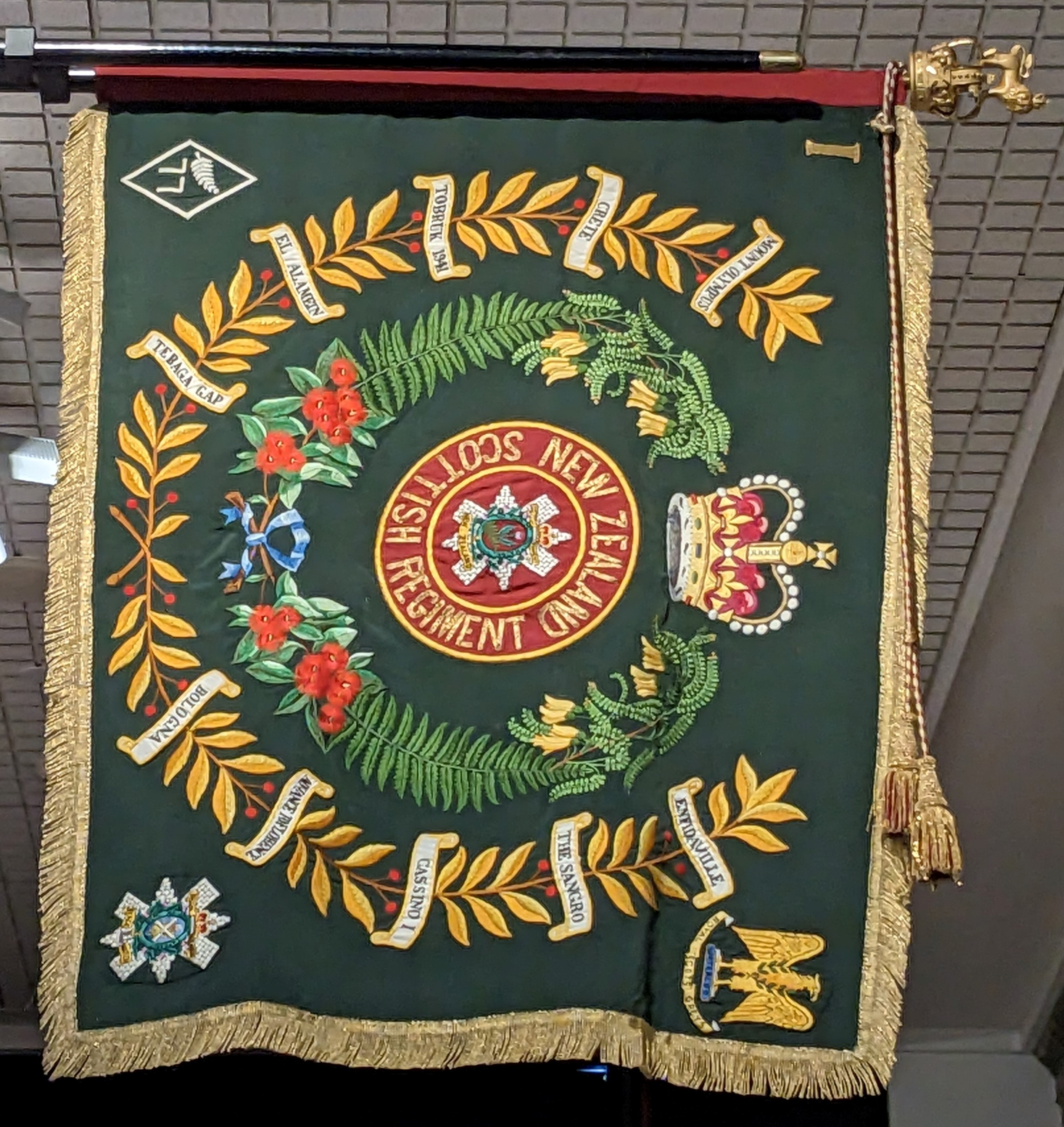
The Queen's (left) and Regimental (right) Colours

Discussions began in 1957 as to the award of colours to the New Zealand Scottish. As an armoured car unit, it was unclear if the regiment was entitled to a guidon (borne by mounted rifles) or a stand of colours (borne by infantry). It was decided that colours were most appropriate as they commemorated the regiments origins as an infantry regiment. The Governor-General, Sir Bernard Fergusson, presented the regiment with a stand of colours in 1963.

The Regiment inherited the battle honours from the Divisional Cavalry Regiment which served in the 2nd New Zealand Division. The following battle honours were authorised to be emblazoned on the colours:

- Mount Olympus
- Crete
- Tobruk, 1941
- El Alamein
- Tebaga Gap
- Enfidaville
- The Sangro
- Cassino I
- Advance to Florence
- Bologna

The colours were laid up at the Toitū Otago Settlers Museum in 2016. The ceremony involved 100 soldiers from Queen Alexandra's Mounted Rifles and 2nd/4th Battalion, Royal New Zealand Infantry Regiment.

== Memorials ==
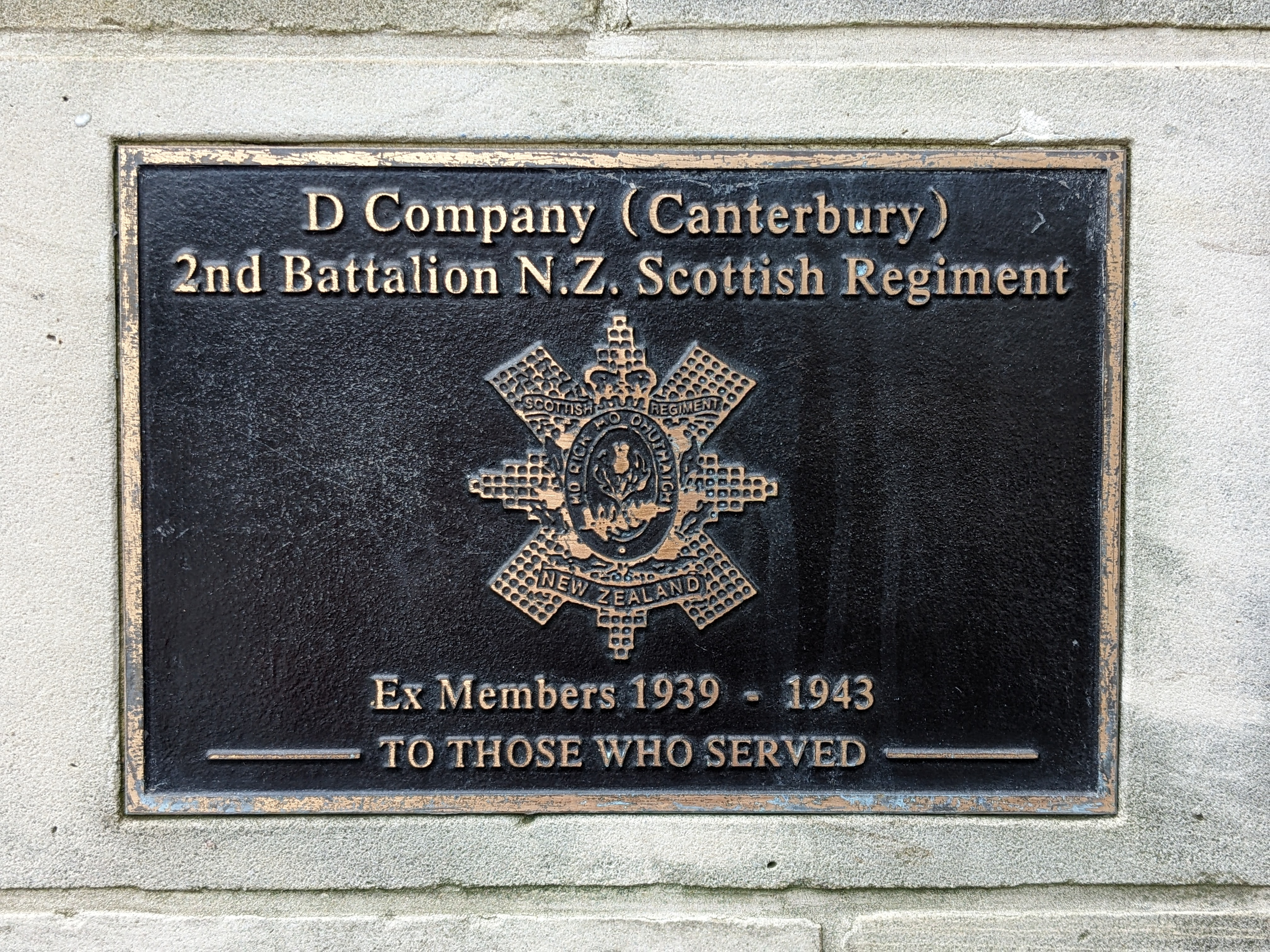
Plaque on the Bridge of Remembrance in Christchurch

A plaque on the Bridge of Remembrance in Christchurch is dedicated to D Company, 2nd Battalion New Zealand Scottish Regiment.

== Alliances ==
- United Kingdom – Black Watch (1939–2013)
- United Kingdom – Royal Scots Greys (2nd Dragoons) (1950–1971)
- United Kingdom – Royal Scots Dragoon Guards (1971–2013)

== Freedoms ==
The 2nd Squadron (New Zealand Scottish) was awarded the Freedom of the City of Dunedin in 1977. The charter was last exercised in 2016 when the colours were laid up and the charter returned to the Dunedin City Council.
