= Corps of Royal New Zealand Military Police =

Provost agency of the New Zealand Army

The Corps of Royal New Zealand Military Police
- Badge of the Corps of Royal New Zealand Military Police
- Active: circa 1914
- Country: New Zealand
- Branch: New Zealand Army
- Type: Military Police
- Size: One Company
- Motto: Ko Tatou Hei Tauira (By Example We Lead)
- Colours: Royal blue and white
- March: The Watchtower
- Anniversaries: 18 July 1952

Insignia
- Dress Distinction: White Lanyard worn on the left arm with Service Dress
- Patch: White "MP" on Blue Patch on the left arm with Working (Camouflage) Dress

The Corps of Royal New Zealand Military Police (RNZMP) provides military police services to the New Zealand Army, performing a variety of roles including criminal investigations. It consists of one major unit, the 1st (New Zealand) Military Police Company, although members of the corps can also be posted to other units within the New Zealand Army. The corps is a combat support element responsible for the policing, investigation, custodial, security and battlefield circulation control support to New Zealand Defence Force land elements. Personnel within the corps include commissioned officers and non-commissioned officers of both the Regular Force and Territorial Force.

== History ==
=== Pre-1915 ===
==== Provost Marshal lineage ====
As a Corps, RNZMP date from 1915. However, there are links to earlier military policing. As the executive representatives of the Provost Marshal of the New Zealand Army, the RNZMP can claim the same ancient lineage as the Royal Military Police. The first record of a person conducting the duties of a provost marshal stem from 28 May 1241, when Henry II appointed William of Cassingham as a military "Sergeant of the Peace. He and his under-provosts were the ancestors of the modern Royal Military Police.

The first recorded provost marshal in English history of whom there is a personal record is Sir Henry Guldeford (or Guylford), who was appointed in 1511. The provost marshal was responsible for maintaining discipline within the English armies together with the King's personal security, and was also described as the "first and greatest gaoler of the Army". As the provost marshal's office gradually assumed more and more duties of a policing nature within the Army, he was provided with State-paid troops, referred to in Henry VIII's day as provost companies.

The Articles of War of 1591, which were written during the reign of Queen Elizabeth, laid down that: "No man shall resist the Provost Marshal, or other of his officers, in apprehending any malfactor, but if need be shall aid and assist him..."

During the Peninsula War of 1813–14, the Duke of Wellington asked for a provost marshal to be appointed to hang looters; by the end of the Peninsular War the provost marshal controlled 24 assistant provost marshals. The assistants were also authorised to hang offenders and eventually each division had its own assistant provost marshal.

==== New Zealand colonial period ====
New Zealand became a colony of Britain in 1840 following the signing of the Treaty of Waitangi. Policing within New Zealand started the same year with the arrival of six constables accompanying Lieutenant-Governor William Hobson's official landing party. Early policing was undertaken by a colonial police force, who were part police and part militia. With many of its first officers having seen prior service in either Ireland or Australia, this early force resembled a military police unit.

The New Zealand Armed Constabulary Act 1867 established an organised structure for a group that operated along gendarmerie lines. The Armed Constabulary took part in the New Zealand Wars against Māori opposed to colonial expansion. Still part police and part militia, this organisation is considered the predecessor of military policing within New Zealand.

Following the end of the New Zealand Wars, the Police Force Act 1886 established a single centralised police force. At the same time, the government moved the militia functions of the old Armed Constabulary to the forerunner of the New Zealand Defence Force called the New Zealand Permanent Militia. The New Zealand Permanent Militia, and later the New Zealand Military Forces, did not have a formal military police element. However, during the Second Boer War (1899–1902) individual New Zealand soldiers served with the British Mounted Military Police in South Africa.

=== 1914–1990 ===
During World War I New Zealand military police served on all fronts where New Zealand soldiers fought as part of 1 NZEF. They were all mounted, and the MP squadron within the Mounted Rifle Brigade in the Middle East was allegedly the subject of a very favourable report from Major-General Chaytor, commander of the NZ Brigade. After the Armistice, the NZ Military Police were disbanded.

During World War II, the NZ Military Police were re-established. The first detachment sailed for the Middle East in January 1940, where they served on all fronts and in all engagements with 2NZEF. However, focus upon their duties, including battlefield circulation control, policing and investigations can diminish recognition of their combat role: "Every move our columns have made since we crossed the El Alamein battlefield has been marked by [the Divisional Provost Company]". They first used lights at night (originally 20 old railway lamps) to guide New Zealand columns through dangerous mountain passes in Greece. The use of 'lamp lines' evolved further during the desert campaign; a shaded green light was attached to a black diamond sign, atop a steel picket. Men from Divisional Provost Company went forward at times even further than armoured patrols, sometimes under shellfire, to find and mark tracks. The practice of ‘tinning the route’ became normal. As fighting and supply columns moved down these distinct ‘thrust lines’, the diamonds were retrieved and replaced by petrol tins, two high, marked with the fernleaf emblem. Consequently, "for every mile our columns moved, [the Provos] covered three or four. When [our columns] were halted, they went forward, marking tracks through seemingly impassable country". Their familiar diamond signs were destined to show, at about 700 yard intervals, the way to Tripoli, 1400 miles to the west.

==== SS Chakdina ====
Late in the afternoon of 5 December 1941 the SS Chakdina left Tobruk Harbour bound for Alexandria carrying approximately 380 wounded Allied soldiers, 100 German and Italian prisoners and 120 crew. Just after 9 p.m. an enemy plane released a torpedo that struck and exploded in an aft hold. The crowded little ship sank in a strong swell within a few minutes and some 400 men were drowned, 80 of them New Zealanders. Major Hayton reported that NZ Provosts, 2nd Lieutenant Taff, Warrant Officer Malin, Sgt. Robinson and Lance Corporal Knopwood were on board the SS Chakdina. Taff and Robinson were rescued and taken aboard HMS Fardale. However, Malin and Knopwood died.

==== S.S.Chantala ====
On 7 December 1941, Major Hayton reported the sinking of the SS Chantala in Tobruk Harbour. ‘Appendix B’ is attached to his report:

On Sunday, the, No.1 Section was detailed to escort 500 German and Italian prisoners from the POW camp at Tobruk to Alexandria, making the sea voyage by the SS CHANTALA. Loading operations were enlivened by two bombing attacks, first by a formation and later by a solitary German plane, both were beaten off by fire of an anti-aircraft vessel lying alongside the 'Chantala'.

Shortly after 1700 hours, the last batch of prisoners having been escorted to their quarters below decks, the ship made ready for sea, a tug moving her slowly from the wharf and turning her into the channel, while all hands moved to ‘action stations’. Just as her bow was swinging towards the open sea, there was a terrific explosion and with a huge column of water mounting beside her, the vessel was lifted almost clear of the water. The ‘Chantala’ had struck a mine, and almost instantly took on a sharp list.

Holed slightly aft of the forward hold, the vessel made water fast, and the Italians fought wildly to reach a single, narrow ladder leading to the deck above, treading ruthlessly over their companions pinned beneath broken hatch covers and debris. For a time pandemonium reigned, but the Provost section, who, although scattered all over the ship, had escaped injury, received orders to load the prisoners on to a barge which had been brought close up to the port side. Blocks and tackle were rigged and although it was necessary to check a rush by the prisoners, good progress was made and the barge was quickly filled. Moved to No. 3 jetty, the barge there discharged the prisoners, those badly wounded being treated in a nearby air raid shelter and the remainder returned to the POW Camp. Others remaining on the ship were disembarked at No.6 jetty, where the same procedure was followed.

Their task completed, the Provost section was able to leave the ship at 2300 hours. Working in complete darkness, they had rendered what assistance they could to injured men and restored order among the prisoners, many of whom acted as demented men. The Marquis of Queensbury may not have approved of the methods used, but the necessary results were obtained.

Major E.W. Hayton who was wounded in early July 1942, was awarded the DSO for outstanding provost duties at the Battle of El Alamein while serving as the Assistant Provost Marshal beside Major R.R.J. Jenkin who was commanding the NZ Divisional Provost Company at the same battle. Jenkin was wounded in November 1942 while travelling toward Halfaya Pass. He was temporarily replaced by Capt H.M.Blacklock until former Provost commander, Capt E.C.Awdry, assumed this position. Jenkin was later promoted to lieutenant colonel and appointed Deputy Provost Marshal in Italy. After the war ended, the military police were again disbanded.

Prior to the Halfaya crossing, Provost Coy was attached to B Echelon of 4 Light Armed Brigade and instructed to clear the Pass road for a convoy to proceed under absolute priority with petrol urgently required by fighting tanks. They laid light lines and assisted in clearing German mines from the road and verges. Jenkin estimated that during the day and night of November 11, 5000 vehicles went over the pass under Provost supervision.

Provost Diary Entry: "10 Nov. Good reports coming through. Getting supplies up is the main problem. Heavy traffic on the coast road is cause of delays. Drove one hundred miles today. Passed through Sidi Barrani this morning. Getting short on cigarettes. 11 Nov. Bypassed Sollum by going over Halfaya (“Hellfire”) Pass at noon. Heavy traffic congestion at the pass. German ME109s were doing some strafing for a while. Passed through Capuzzo at dusk. 12 Nov. At Div HQ. The O.C., Captain Jenkins went over a mine in his car and had his foot fractured. His driver is suffering from shock".

=== Post World War II ===
On 18 February 1949, the New Zealand Military Police were re-gazetted, and re-formed on 24 March 1951. On 18 July 1952, Her Majesty the Queen granted assent for the title "Royal", and the Corps became the "Royal New Zealand Provost Corps (RNZ Pro)".

In 1952, a Colonel Commandant was appointed to the Corps. The first was Colonel E.W. Hayton. On his death in 1957 he was succeeded by Lieutenant Colonel R.R.J. Jenkin, MBE, who remained in the post until 1968.

In August 1955, the first peacetime Regular Force commissioned officer was appointed to the Corps. This was Captain D.J. MacLeod who had first seen service with the Scots Guards and later with the Special Investigation Branch (SIB) of the Royal Military Police. MacLeod was appointed Head of Corps RNZ Pro at Army Headquarters and held this appointment until October 1962 when a reorganisation of the Corps took place.

RNZ Pro personnel served with the New Zealand elements sent in support of the British response to the Malayan Emergency and in the Indonesia-Malaysia Confrontation.

On 1 October 1962, the first peacetime Provost Marshal of the New Zealand Army was appointed: Lieutenant Colonel R.H.F. Holloway, OBE, RNZA. Following this, in 1964 the first Regular Force Deputy Assistant Provost Marshal, Lieutenant Burton, was appointed.

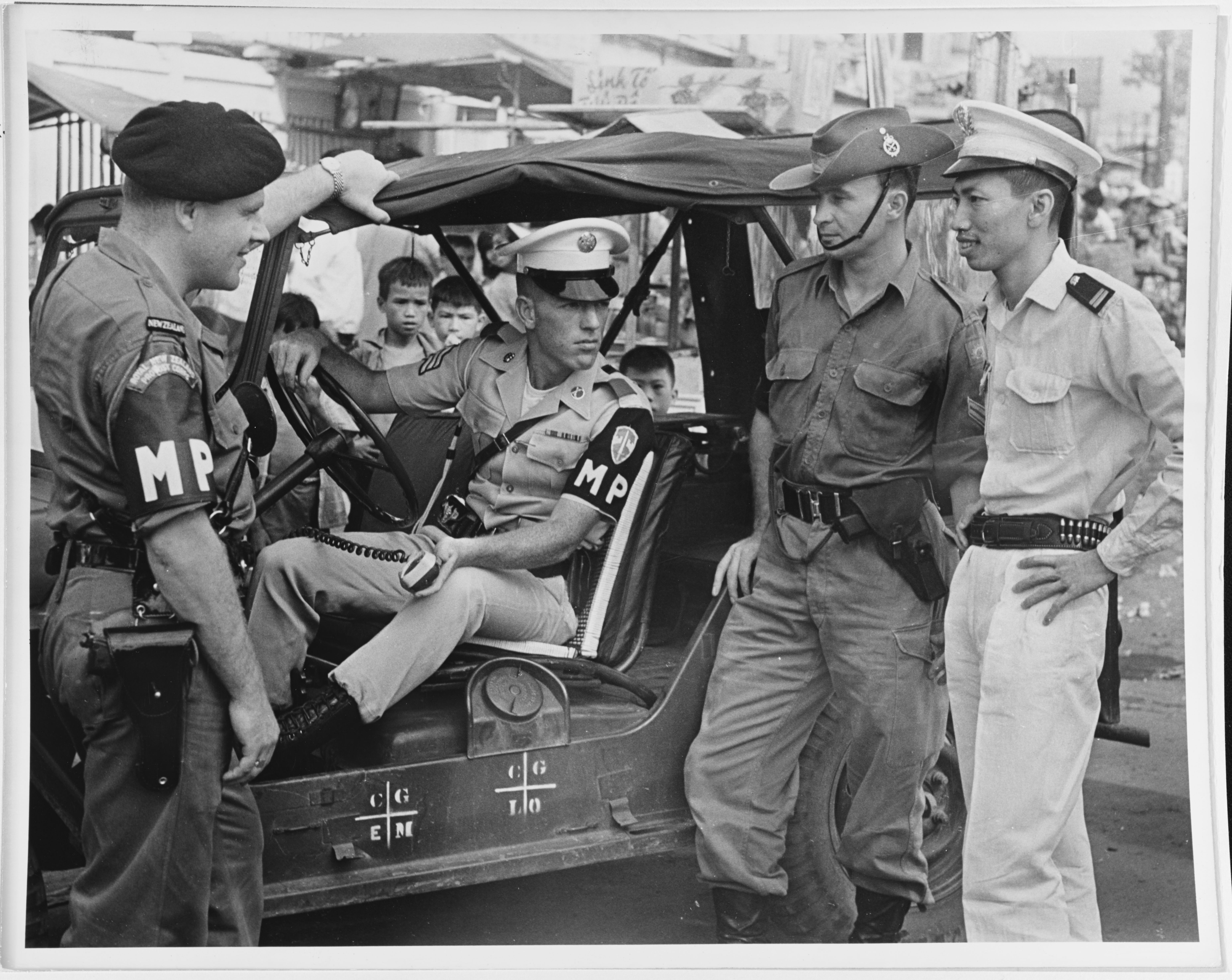
New Zealand, U.S., and Australian military police meet with a local Policeman in Saigon, Vietnam, 1965

RNZMP were part of New Zealand's military and administrative forces sent to Vietnam in 1965. New Zealand Military Police patrolled with Australian Military Police and U.S Military Police as part of security operations of U.S. Naval Support Activity Saigon which was responsible for the protection of U.S personnel and installations in Saigon. From 1966 Australian administrative forces for combat operations moved to Vung Tau New Zealand MPs served with the Australian MPs.

RNZ Pro personnel were stationed with New Zealand Force South East Asia in Singapore as part of the Far East Strategic Reserve from about 1972 until 1989. They formed part of a multinational military police unit, along with Royal Military Police, the Royal Australian Corps of Military Police and service police from the Royal New Zealand Air Force and Royal New Zealand Navy.

From 1979 until the mid-1980s, RNZ Pro / RNZMP personnel provided security at the New Zealand Embassy in Moscow.

On 18 December 1981, HM Queen Elizabeth consented to a title change and a new corps badge. The title was changed to the "Corps of Royal New Zealand Military Police".

== Role and employment ==
The current role of the RNZMP is to police the force, and provide police support to the mission. "Policing the force" refers to activities focussed internally on own troops, while "police support to the mission" refers to activities applied on a military force's objectives.

The five functional areas of RNZMP are:

1. Policing Operations
2. Investigation Operations
3. Custodial Operations
4. Security Operations
5. Battlefield Circulation Control

Within New Zealand, RNZMP focuses primarily on policing operations to prevent crime affecting the military community, and investigations into incidents involving military personnel or property. MPs are also deployed on security tasks within NZ when required.

Deployed activities are focused primarily on the policing/investigation and security functional areas. MPs may form part of a multinational MP unit conducting own force policing and investigations, or may be deployed as a stand-alone MP element within an NZDF deployed force. MPs also provide Close Protection to Senior NZ military officers and government VIP within military theatres.

== Law enforcement jurisdiction ==
RNZMP commissioned officers are appointed as "provost officers", with the non-commissioned officers warranted to act on behalf of them. This provides RNZMP with jurisdiction over all personnel subject to the Armed Forces Discipline Act 1971, meaning all service personnel (whether Navy, Army or Air Force) and in selected cases other personnel.

MPs are also delegated specific powers that give them jurisdiction over all personnel, whether civilian or service person, within Defence Areas. A Defence Area includes military camps and bases within NZ, RNZN ships, and other areas (both in NZ and other countries) may be declared a Defence Area in specific circumstances.

When within New Zealand, the RNZMP must refer the most serious crimes (e.g. murder, rape) to the NZ Police. While deployed in an operational theatre, the RNZMP retains jurisdiction of all matters involving NZDF personnel up to and including murder and rape.

== Structure ==
The Provost Marshal of the New Zealand Army (PM(A)) is an NZ Army colonel serving within Headquarters NZDF, usually as part of the human resources branch. The PM(A) is not an RNZMP officer, and is a secondary appointment held by that officer.

The colonel commandant has in recent times been a senior NZ Police officer. They are given the honorary rank of colonel, but the role is generally one of advocacy, removed from the command structure.

The Corps of RNZMP has one major unit, 1st (New Zealand) Military Police Company, which was until 2008 known as the Force Military Police Company. The majority of RNZMP personnel are posted to this unit, although there are some who are posted to other units within the NZDF.

The senior technical MP within the NZ Army is a major who holds the appointment of the Officer Commanding 1st (New Zealand) Military Police Company. The senior non-commissioned officer is a Warrant Officer Class 1 called the Provost Sergeant Major.

The sub-unit elements and locations of 1st (New Zealand) Military Police Company, are as follows:

- 2nd Military Police Platoon, located at Linton Military Camp
- 3rd Military Police Platoon, located at Burnham Military Camp
- 4th Military Police Detachment, located at Waiouru Military Camp
- 5th Military Police Detachment, located at Trentham Military Camp

== Recruiting and training ==
Formerly, soldiers within the RNZMP were recruited from personnel already serving within the NZ Army, they could not join directly, this has since changed. All applicants undergo a selection process. On selection, soldiers attend the Joint Service Police Basic Course conducted at the Military Police Training Wing in Trentham. This 10-week course trains the individual in basic military and criminal legislation, police procedures, use of force (defensive tactics), advanced driving, and basic investigative techniques. If they pass this course, the applicants are accepted into the RNZMP and allowed to wear the MP brassard/patch.

Officers accepted into the RNZMP conduct their initial training with the Royal Australian Corps of Military Police. They then attend the same RNZMP / Joint Service Police courses as MP soldiers, run at MP Training Wing. Additionally, RNZMP officers attend the courses attended by all officers within NZ Army.

Through their career, RNZMP personnel regularly return to MP Training Wing for continuing professional development courses. MP personnel also attend courses conducted at the Royal New Zealand Police College, and by allied MP such as the Royal Australian Corps of Military Police and the Royal Military Police.

Military police training was originally conducted at the Military Police School in Papakura Military Camp from 1949 to 1979. In February 1979, the MP School was moved to Trentham Camp and later became a Training Wing of (then) Force Military Police Company. MP Training Wing now conducts all (Army) military police training, and Joint Service Police training for RNZN Naval Police and RNZAF Police personnel.

Courses conducted at MP Training Wing include investigative courses, security / close protection courses, and police command and planning courses. Instructors on the courses include serving MPs, Naval Police and RNZAF Police personnel; NZ Police personnel and various personnel from other Corps within the NZDF and other NZ Government Departments. Students attending MP Training Wing courses have included service personnel from Tonga, Fiji, Singapore, and Papua New Guinea.

All RNZMP soldiers and officers are trained in close protection and serious investigations (e.g. murder, rape, fraud) skills. There are no specialisations within the RNZMP.

== Insignia and features ==
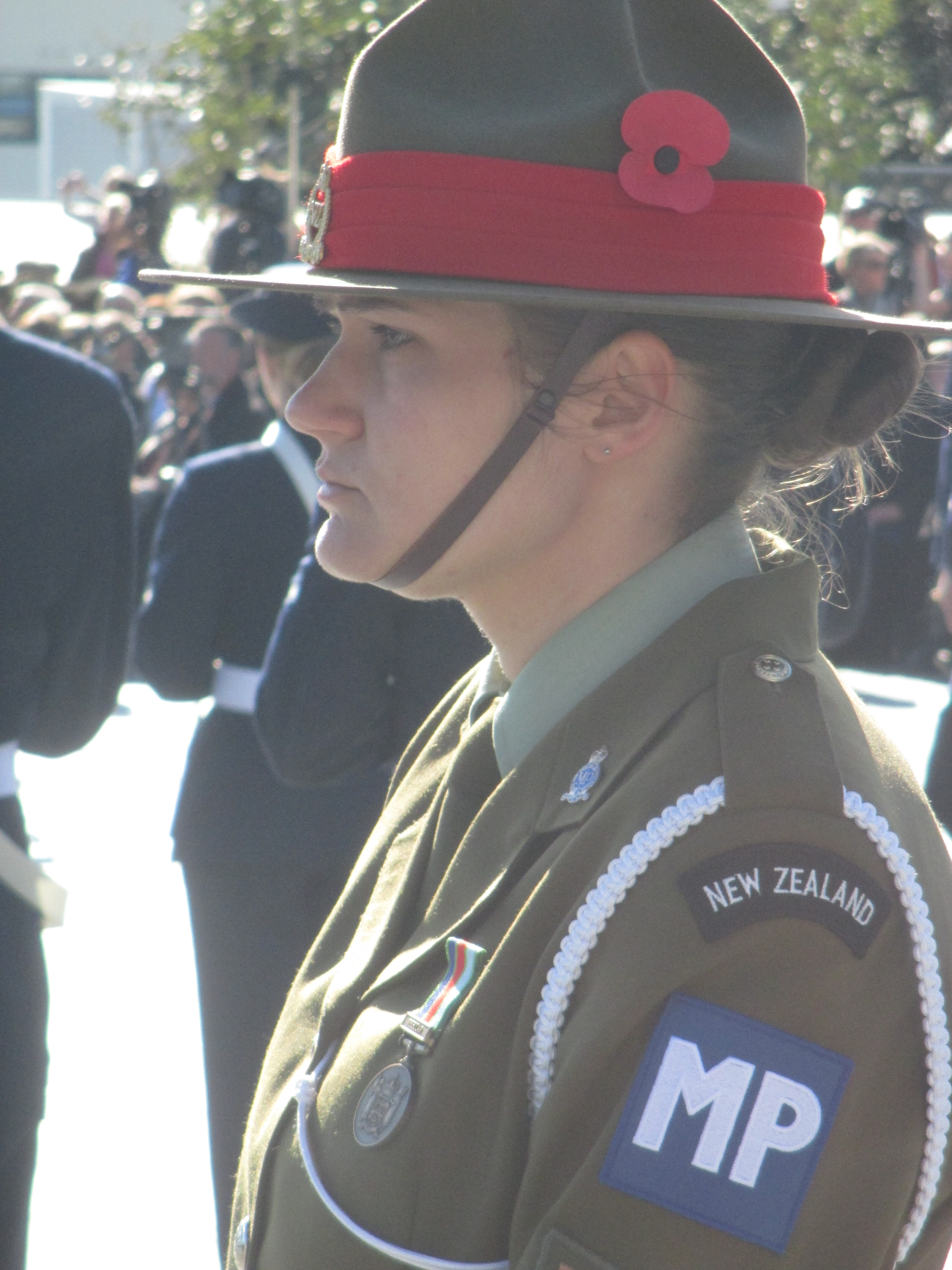
The "MP" patch identifies this woman as being a member of the New Zealand Defence Force Military Police.

=== Corps colours ===
The corps colours are royal blue and white. Until about 2002, when the NZ Army changed all personnel to a single beret colour (dark green), RNZMP personnel wore a bright blue beret as opposed to the red worn by most Commonwealth MP forces. It is thought that this is because the red colour was in use when the Corps was re-established; however, a blue puggaree was worn on the headdress worn by MPs during World War II. Until the change in 2002, this was a useful distinction when dealing with own-force policing in a coalition environment.

"Outside of any national feelings, there is something about the red cap of the Corps of Military Police that makes it resemble the proverbial red rag, particularly if a man has had a few drinks. The hat with the blue puggaree worn by our Provost Corps was much less offensive...as time went and men become tougher and war-weary, the arrival of the CMP undoubtedly caused irritation and sometimes bred increased violence."

The blue and white colours remain on the corps belt and on the MP brassard or patch. The MP brassard is worn on the left arm with service dress while the MP Patch is worn on the right arm of camouflage uniform.

=== White lanyard ===
The RNZMP dress distinction is the white lanyard worn with service dress, which stems from the silver chain lanyard used to secure the police whistle previously used by MP. It now consists of white knotted cord worn around the left shoulder, and affixed to the left breast pocket button, or second jacket button for women in Service Dress with jackets.

=== Corps birthday ===
The Corps of RNZMP birthday is 18 July (1952), the date when the 'Royal' prefix was granted.

=== Patron saint ===
The patron saint of the RNZMP is Saint Michael, as both the patron saint of police and soldiers.

== Affiliations ==
The Corps of RNZMP has links with:

- The Royal Military Police
- The Royal Australian Corps of Military Police

== Order of precedence ==
Preceded by New Zealand Army Legal Service	New Zealand Army Order of Precedence	Succeeded by Royal New Zealand Army Education Corps
