= New Zealand military ranks =

New Zealand military ranks are largely based on those of the United Kingdom. The three services (Army, Navy, and Air Force) have their own rank structure, with a rank equivalency that allows seamless interoperability between the services. All three services form part of the New Zealand Defence Force.

== Commissioned officer ranks ==
Navy	Army	Air Force	Notes
Admiral of the Fleet	Field Marshal	Marshal of the Air Force	King Charles III is the only current Admiral of the Fleet, Field Marshal and Marshal of the RNZAF.
Vice admiral (VADM)	Lieutenant general (LTGEN)	Air marshal (AM)	Rank held by the current Chief of Defence Force; therefore only one of the services will have this rank at any one time. It is the highest obtainable rank of New Zealand Defence Force personnel.
Rear admiral (RADM)	Major general (MAJGEN)	Air vice-marshal (AVM)	Held by the Vice Chief of Defence Force, Commander Joint Forces New Zealand, and the Chiefs of Army, Navy and Air Force. Other individuals holding this rank would be in specialised (United Nations or other coalition) postings.
Commodore (CDRE)	Brigadier (BRIG)	Air commodore (AIRCDRE)	
Captain (CAPT)	Colonel (COL) (Chaplain Class I)	Group captain (GPCAPT) (Chaplain Class I)	
Commander (CDR)	Lieutenant colonel (LTCOL) (Chaplain Class II)	Wing commander (WGCDR) (Chaplain Class II)	
Lieutenant commander (LT CDR)	Major (MAJ) (Chaplain Class III)	Squadron leader (SQNLDR) (Chaplain Class III)	
Lieutenant (LT)	Captain (CAPT) (Chaplain Class IV)	Flight lieutenant (FLTLT) (Chaplain Class IV)	
Sub lieutenant (SLT)	Lieutenant (LT)	Flying officer (FGOFF)	
Ensign (ENS)	Second lieutenant (2LT)	Pilot officer (PLTOFF)	The Army and Air Force's first recognised commissioned rank.
Midshipman (MID)	Officer cadet (OCDT)	Officer cadet (OCDT)	The rank of Midshipman is recognised as a commissioned rank; however, the rank of Officer Cadet in the Army and Air Force is not, and is used only for the purposes of training.

=== Rank insignia ===
The rank insignia of Commissioned Officers.

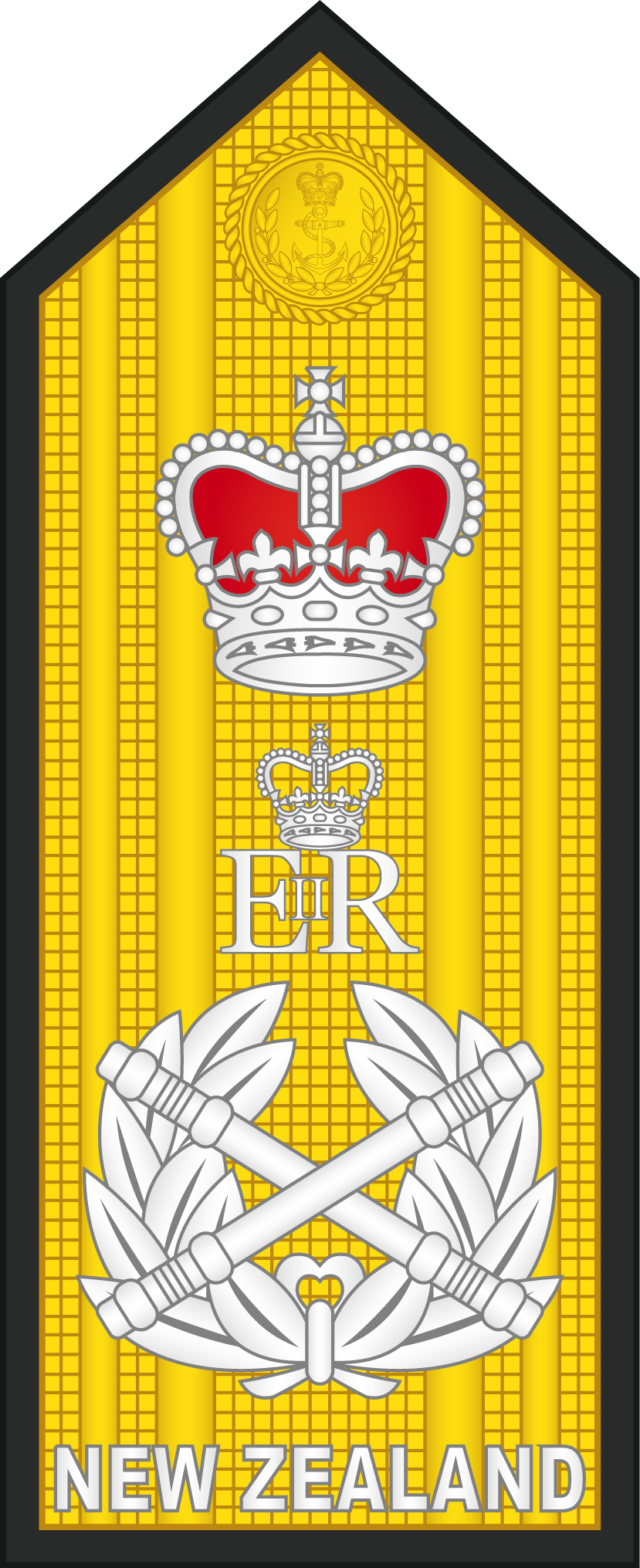
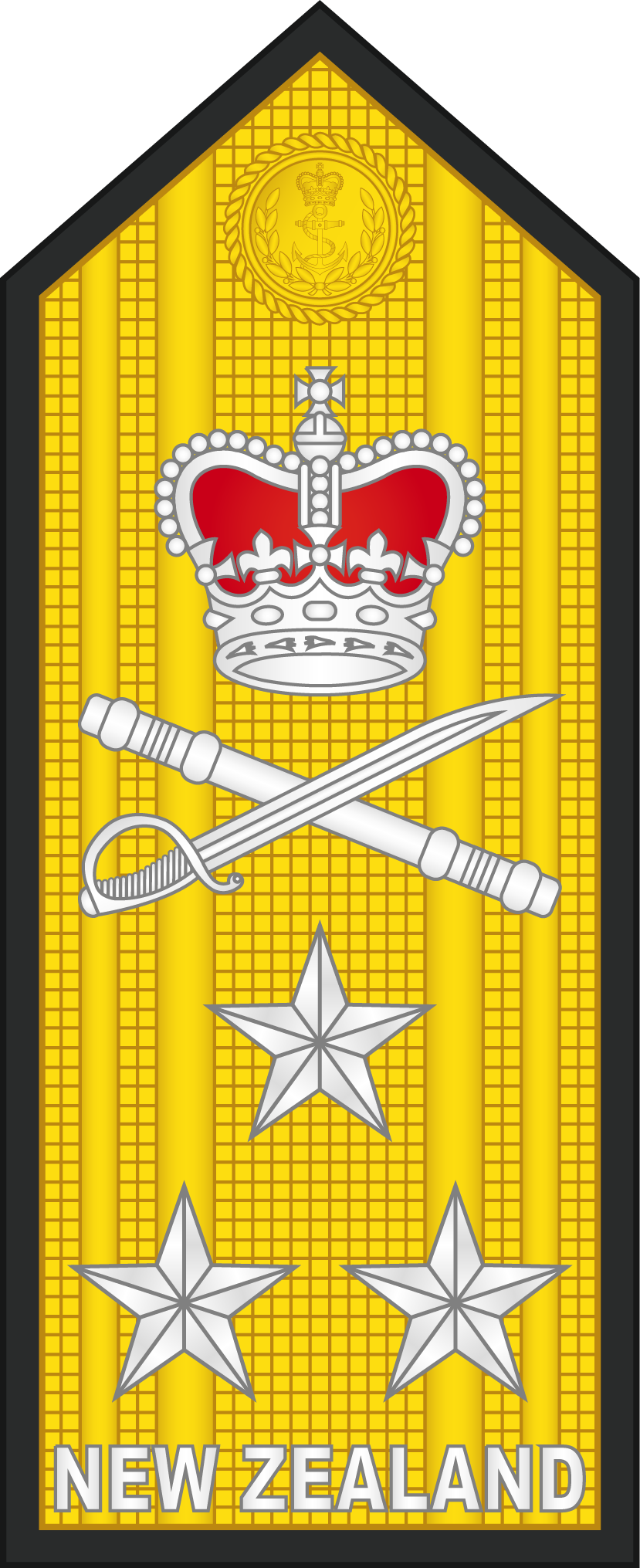
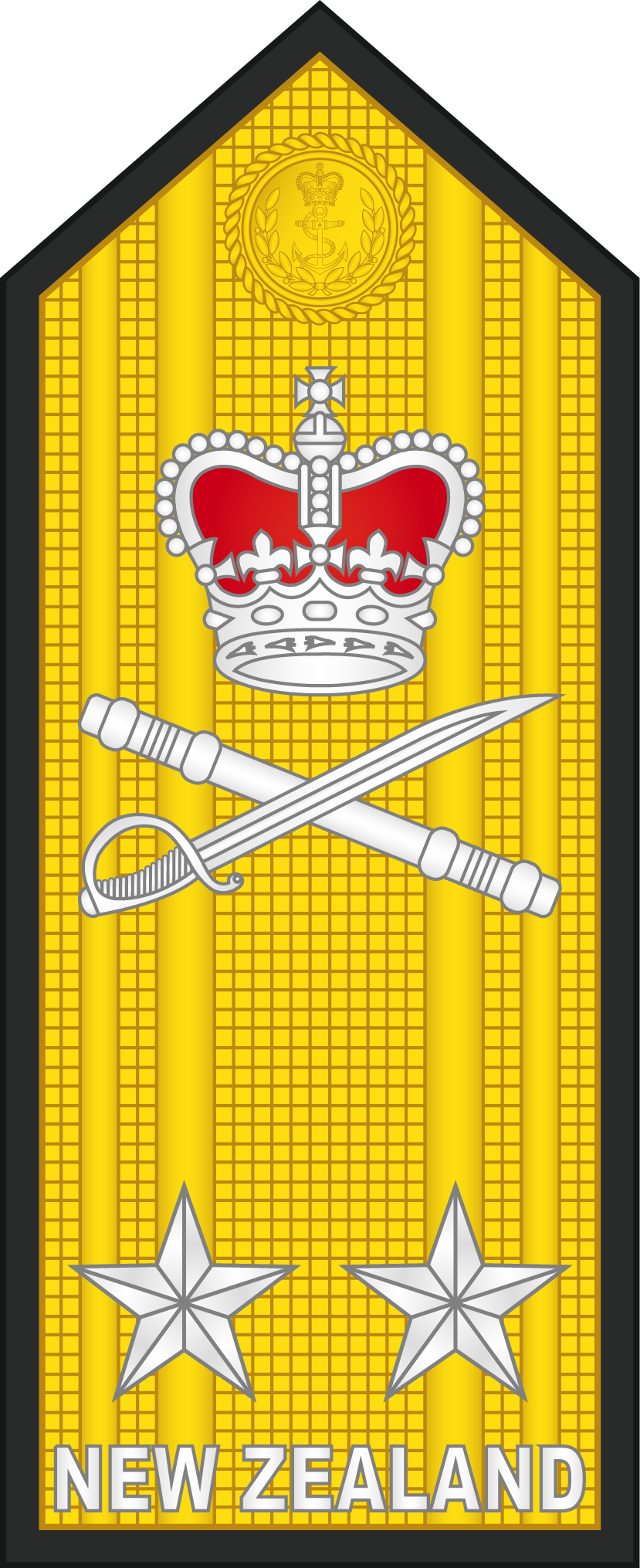
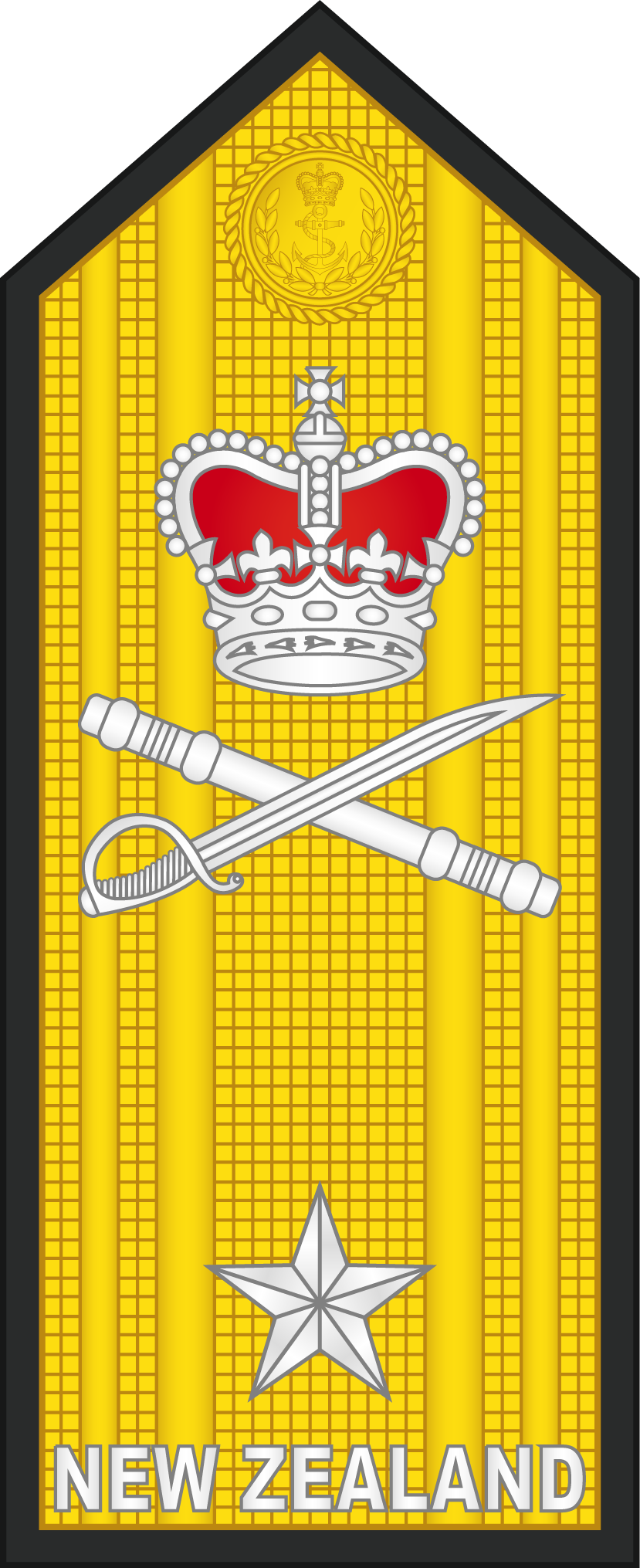
Rank group	General / flag officers				Senior officers			Junior officers
Royal New Zealand Navy
Royal New Zealand Navy	Admiral of the fleet	Vice admiral	Rear admiral	Commodore	Captain	Commander	Lieutenant commander	Lieutenant	Sub lieutenant	Ensign
New Zealand Army
New Zealand Army	Field marshal	Lieutenant-general	Major-general	Brigadier	Colonel	Lieutenant-colonel	Major	Captain	Lieutenant	Second lieutenant
Royal New Zealand Air Force
Royal New Zealand Air Force	Marshal of the RNZAF	Air marshal	Air vice-marshal	Air commodore	Group captain	Wing commander	Squadron leader	Flight lieutenant	Flying officer	Pilot officer
Rank group	General / flag officers				Senior officers			Junior officers

==== Student officer ranks ====
Rank group	Student officer
Royal New Zealand Navy
Royal New Zealand Navy	Midshipman
Royal New Zealand Air Force
Royal New Zealand Air Force	Officer cadet

== Non-commissioned personnel ==
Navy	Army	Air force	Notes
Warrant Officer (WO)	Warrant Officer Class One (WO1)	Warrant Officer (W/O)	The Warrant Officer of the Navy (WON), Sergeant Major of The Army (SMA), Warrant Officer of the Air Force (WOAF), Warrant Officer Defence Force (WODF), And Army Regimental Sergeant Majors (RSMs) hold this rank.
	Warrant Officer Class Two (WO2)		Company Sergeant Majors (CSMs), and Battery Sergeant Majors (BSMs) hold this rank. The Air Force and Navy have no Equivalent to this rank. The Air Force did have an equivalent up until it was phased out sometime during the 80s/90s.
Chief Petty Officer (CPO)	Staff Sergeant (SSGT)	Flight Sergeant (F/S)	
Petty Officer (PO)	Sergeant (SGT)	Sergeant (SGT)	
Leading Hand (LDH)	Bombardier/Corporal (BDR/CPL)	Corporal (CPL)	Army personnel in artillery units use the rank of Bombardier (BDR) in place of Corporal.
	Lance Bombardier/Lance Corporal (LBDR/LCPL)		Army personnel in artillery units use the rank of Lance Bombardier (L/BDR) in place of Lance Corporal
Able rate (ABR)		Leading Aviator Classification (LAC)	ABRs and LACs are not considered NCOs and these ranks are normally awarded after completing trade training.
Ordinary rate (ORT)	Gunner (GNR) / Trooper (TPR) / Sapper (SPR) / Signaller (SIG) / Private (PTE) / Craftsman RNZEME	Aviator Classification (AC)	In the Army, an individual's trade title is sometimes interchanged with the rank of Private.

Note: Naval other rank personnel are referred to by both their rank and trade. Thus a sailor employed as a chef would generally hold the rank of ordinary chef (OCH), with a few exceptions. A Warrant Officer with a trade of weapon technician would hold the rank of Warrant Officer Weapon Technician (WOWT).

=== Rank insignia ===
The rank insignia of non-commissioned officers and enlisted personnel.

Rank group	Senior NCOs				Junior NCOs		Enlisted
Royal New Zealand Navy
Royal New Zealand Navy	Warrant officer		Chief petty officer	Petty officer	Leading hand		Able rate	Ordinary rate
New Zealand Army								No insignia
New Zealand Army	Warrant officer class 1	Warrant officer class 2	Staff sergeant	Sergeant	Corporal	Lance corporal		Private (or equivalent)
Royal New Zealand Air Force
Royal New Zealand Air Force	Warrant Officer		Flight Sergeant	Sergeant	Corporal		Leading Aircraftman	Aircraftman
Rank group	Senior NCOs				Junior NCOs		Enlisted

== Definitions ==
=== Non-commissioned officer ===
A non-commissioned officer is defined as:

"(a) In relation to the navy, a rating of warrant officer, chief petty officer, petty officer, or leading rank; and includes—

(i) A non-commissioned officer of the army or the air force attached to the navy; and
(ii) A person duly attached or lent as a non-commissioned officer to or seconded for service or appointed for duty as a non-commissioned officer with the navy:

(b) In relation to the army, a soldier above the rank of private but below the rank of officer cadet; and includes a warrant officer; and also includes—

(i) A non-commissioned officer of the navy or the air force attached to the army; and
(ii) A person duly attached or lent as a non-commissioned officer to or seconded for service or appointed for duty as a non-commissioned officer with the army:

(c) In relation to the air force, an airman above the rank of leading aviator classification but below the rank of officer cadet; and includes a warrant officer; and also includes—

(i) A non-commissioned officer of the navy or the army attached to the air force; and
(ii) A person duly attached or lent as a non-commissioned officer to or seconded for service or appointed for duty as a non-commissioned officer with the air force:" — Defence Act 1990, Sect 2 (Interpretation)

=== Commissioned officers ===
Officers of the New Zealand Defence Force are commissioned by the Governor-General of New Zealand on behalf of the monarch of New Zealand, King Charles III. See also Officer (armed forces). Salutes rendered to officers by junior officers and enlisted personnel are indirect salutes to the monarch, based on the officer holding the monarch's authority.

== Higher flag ranks and ceremonial ranks ==
Appointments to the most senior ranks (those above the rank held by the chief of the defence force, usually lieutenant general or equivalent) are ceremonial, for the head of state and members of the royal family.
