= Military Police Corps =

Military Police Corps may refer to:

- Canadian Military Police Corps, which existed from 1917 to 1920
- Military Police Corps (Indonesia)
- Military Police Corps (Ireland)
- Military Police Corps (Israel)
- Kempeitai, Imperial Japanese Military Police Corps
- Military Police Corps (United States)

== See also ==
- Corps of Military Police (disambiguation)
- Royal Military Police, a corps of the British Army
- Military police
