= Sub Rosa, NZIC Association =

Sub Rosa is the name of the New Zealand Intelligence Corps association. Its members are drawn from serving and retired members of the Corps and others that have served in intelligence positions in the New Zealand Defence Force.

The phrase is Latin and means 'under the rose', because the rose was an emblem of secrecy hung above council tables and confessionals. The origin of which traces to a famous story in which Cupid gave Harpocrates, the god of silence, a rose to bribe him not to betray the confidence of Venus. Hence the ceilings of Roman banquet-rooms were decorated with roses to remind guests that what was spoken sub vino (under the influence of wine) was also sub rosa. The emblem of Sub Rosa is a Tudor Rose.
