= 10th Infantry Brigade (New Zealand) =

- Active: 1941; 1941–1944
- Country: New Zealand
- Allegiance: New Zealand; Greece
- Branch: New Zealand Military Forces
- Type: Infantry
- Size: Brigade
- Part of: 2nd New Zealand Division (1941); 5th New Zealand Division (1941–1944)
- Engagements: Battle of Crete

Commanders
- Notable commanders: Howard Kippenberger

The 10th Infantry Brigade was a brigade of the New Zealand Military Forces formed on two separate occasions during the Second World War. The brigade was first formed as part of the 2nd New Zealand Division, just prior to the Battle of Crete. It consisted of a variety of New Zealand artillery and support units operating as Infantry, as well as two Greek Infantry regiments. The 10th Brigade was absorbed by 4th Brigade part way through the battle. The 10th Brigade was formed for the second time in New Zealand as a territorial force formation in November 1941 and became part of the 5th Division. By 1944 the threat of Japanese invasion was perceived to be minimal and the 10th Brigade was disbanded.

== Crete ==
=== Background ===
After the defeat in Greece, the Allied forces had been evacuated from the Greek mainland, mostly to Crete. By the end of April 1941 nearly 42,000 Commonwealth and Greek soldiers were present on the island, but most of the heavy equipment and transport had been abandoned during the evacuation. Additionally ammunition and stores were in short supply due to shipping shortages and the threat of attack. Major-General Bernard Freyberg (commanding the 2nd New Zealand Division) was placed in command of the newly formed 'Creforce' and was tasked with defending Crete.

=== Formation ===
The 10th Infantry Brigade was formed on 14 May 1941 in order to place a number of independent units under a single command and unify command in the Galatas area, just west of Chania. Initially the brigade consisted of the 6th Greek Regiment and 'Oakes Force' (an ad hoc unit formed from various New Zealand artillery and support units which had lost their heavy equipment). The 20th Battalion was also placed under 10th Brigade, but operationally was at the disposal of the division. The brigade commander was Lieutenant Colonel Howard Kippenberger, previously the officer commanding of 20th Battalion. On 15 May the 8th Greek Regiment, a detachment of the Divisional Cavalry Regiment and 'Russell Force' (another New Zealand ad hoc unit) were also placed under 10th Brigade. At this point Oakes and Russell Forces were officially formed into the New Zealand Composite Battalion. (Note: The Composite Battalion consisted of a total of 1007 men from 4th and 5th Field Regiments, the Divisional Supply Column, the Divisional Petrol Company and the Reserve Mechanical Transport Company)

=== Battle of Crete ===
The German airborne assault on Crete began on the morning of 20 May. The 10th Brigade was deployed with the Composite Battalion and 6th Greek Regiment in the vicinity of Galatas, and the Divisional Cavalry and 8th Greek Regiment further west near Alikianos. The I and II battalions of the 3rd Fallschirmjäger Regiment were dropped between the two groups of 10th Brigade, and the 7th Fallschirmjäger Engineer Battalion landed to the west. Although the Divisional Cavalry managed to escape north and link up with the Composite Battalion by the afternoon, the 8th Greek Regiment had been encircled. The Greeks managed to hold out until at least 26 May, but the exact details of their actions are unknown. The 3rd Fallschirmjäger Regiment attacked eastward towards the 6th Greek Regiment, which soon crumbled and had to be reinforced by 19th Battalion from the 2nd New Zealand Division's 4th Brigade. The Germans around Galatas held their ground from the 21st. Having taken heavy casualties and low on supplies, they did not believe it was practical to attack any further. Likewise, 10th Brigade was in no state to counterattack and a stalemate ensued in the area.

On 23 May, 10th Brigade ceased to exist when the remaining troops were placed under the command of 4th Brigade. Ultimately the Germans would resume their offensive on Galatas on the 25th and a decision to evacuate all Allied forces from Crete was made on 27 May.

== Home Defence ==
The 10th Brigade was formed for a second time in November 1941. It was formed from two territorial battalions; 2nd Battalion, Cantebury Regiment and 2nd Battalion, New Zealand Scottish Regiment; and was based in Ashburton, New Zealand. As part of the 5th Division, the 10th Brigade was expected to provide a mobile response to a theoretical invasion, while other "fortress troops" provided a static defence of key ports. By 1944, there was no credible threat of invasion, prompting a reduction in size of the territorial forces and the 10th Infantry Brigade was disbanded in August.

== Notes ==
Footnotes

Citations
