= New Zealand Intelligence Corps =

Intelligence agency of the New Zealand Army

The New Zealand Intelligence Corps (NZIC) analyses information from a variety of sources and provides commanders with intelligence on such things as enemy locations, capabilities and intentions. Corps personnel also provide advice on Field Security on operations.

The NZIC is one of the smallest corps in the New Zealand Army. It was formed in 1942, apparently disbanded in 1947, and reformed in 1985. It has both regular and territorial members.

The NZIC school is known as the School of Military Intelligence and Security currently located in Palmerston North.

The NZIC has followed the British Army Intelligence Corps tradition in the selection of dress embellishments. The NZIC motto is "Forewarned is Forearmed".

Up until approximately 2008, soldiers 'corps changed' into the New Zealand Intelligence Corps mainly from the two regular battalions, 1 RNZIR and 2/1 RNZIR, where they had often had previously served in the battalions' intelligence sections. In mid-2008 the NZIC started to accept Direct Entrants (DEs) straight from civilian street, via basic training.

Once trained, the new members of the NZIC can find a number of positions within the New Zealand Army and the New Zealand Defence Force, mainly in the disparate headquarters. The largest dedicated sub-unit within the NZIC is 1 (NZ) Military Intelligence Company (formerly the Force Intelligence Group) (1 (NZ) MI Coy) which is currently based in Linton Military Camp.

The Corps Association is known as Sub Rosa and has a mix of both current and retired members that have served within intelligence positions.

== History ==
- 1907: A report to the House of Representatives indicate that volunteer intelligence officers were responsible for collecting data for mobilisation purposes and updating maps. This activity is consistent with what the British Intelligence Organisation was undertaking at the time.
- 1909: Defence Act. Director of Military Operations and Intelligence created in the Army Staff.
- 1917: Intelligence Officer post created in the NZ Division in the Middle East. It is also believed that New Zealand personnel were involved in Field Security during the First World War.
- 1940: 2 New Zealand Division Intelligence Section, NZ Intelligence Corps formed as part of the 1st Echelon NZ Expeditionary Forces. This Section consisted of two officers and 10 other ranks. During the Second World War the intelligence function was expanded to meet the requirements of 2 (NZ) Div and later 3 (NZ) Div. The following is a summary of the sections raised:
- 1942: The NZIC was officially formed as a TF unit in NZ 01 Jan 1942. Each Military District was requested to provide a suggested design for a badge for the NZIC. The Southern Military District design was adopted and is the basis of the present NZIC badge. The badge was made in brass and bronze. In line with the practice at the time the bronze badge would have been for officers and the brass badge for Other Ranks (OR's).

The Army was reorganised in 1947 and it is thought that the NZIC was not included in the new Order of Battle (ORBAT).

The 1st and 2nd Battalions of the New Zealand Regiment had Intelligence Sections and these served in Malaya and Borneo. These Intelligence Sections then became the Intelligence Sections for 1 RNZIR and 2/1 RNZIR on their formation in 1964. The 1964 Army reorganisation also saw the formation of the 1 Infantry Brigade Intelligence Platoon at Papakura. The Intelligence Platoon was a multi-intelligence discipline organisation with intelligence operators, Photo Interpreters (PI's), linguists and interrogators. The Platoon was under the command of the SO3 Intelligence on HQ 1 Infantry Brigade – Capt "Buster" Hornbrook. 2 Counter Intelligence (CI) Platoon was formed the Platoon Commander, Capt Bruce Jamieson in the post of GSO2 SD at Headquarters Home Command. The CI Platoon was established as part of the Logistics Support Group (LSG). Both the 1 Infantry Brigade Group Intelligence Platoon and 2 CI Platoon were never permanently staffed. Rather they operated on the loan back system. The Platoons therefore, only came together for Annual Camps and some training. The major draw back to the system was that personnel posted to both organisations were spread throughout the Army and in many cases had no intelligence training.

1 Infantry Brigade Group Intelligence Platoon and 2 Counter Intelligence (CI) Platoon were also responsible for conducting intelligence courses for combat intelligence and CI at all levels.

- 1959: The concept of intelligence platoons was taken from the British who formed Intelligence Platoons with each of their brigades in 1959, with this system lasting to 1966 when it was replaced with Intelligence and Security Companies. NZ personnel served with the 28 Commonwealth and then the ANZUK Bde Intelligence and Security Company in Singapore.
- 1975: The New Zealand Army Intelligence Centre was formed at Papakura on 24 Mar 1975 under the command of Major Kim Hoskin. Maj Hoskin had long argued the draw backs of the old intelligence platoon system. In 1973 an intelligence committee, headed by Maj. A.L Birks, was set up to look at the development of Army intelligence. This Committee recommended the formation of the Intelligence Centre but stopped short of endorsing the formation of an Intelligence Corps. The Intelligence Centre had a small, Regular Force (RF) staff, that were responsible for conducting intelligence courses and providing intelligence support to HQ NZLF for major Command Post Exercises (CPX) and Field Training Exercises (FTX). Between 1978 and 1986 the Officers Commanding the Intelligence Centre argued for the formation of multi discipline Intelligence Unit based on a Division Intelligence Company to support the NZLF.
- In 1983 the Intelligence Centre establishment was increased to allow for an extra 12 Territorial Force (TF) to provide extra intelligence staff for HQ NZLF. The idea of a Divisional Intelligence Company was resisted.
- Maj Kim Hoskin requested permission from the British Director of Military Intelligence (DMI) at Ashford during a course in 1975 for NZ intelligence personnel to wear the British Intelligence Corps stable belt. This request was approved and agreed to by the Chief of General Staff (CGS).
- 1987: The ANZUS Rift in 1985 created a unique opportunity for the Army intelligence community. Maj Andrew Renton-Green RNZIR, Officer Commanding (OC) the Intelligence Centre, developed a proposal to recreate the NZ Intelligence Corps. Despite opposition within the Army General Staff, the CGS (MajGen Mace) approved Maj Renton-Green's proposal, along with his plan to form a rounded intelligence unit to support the Ready Reaction Force (RRF) and IEF. This resulted (as a temporary measure) in the devolution of the Intelligence Centre into a Directorate of Military Intelligence (DMI), an Army Intelligence School and a Force Intelligence Group (then termed the FIG).
- The New Zealand Intelligence Corps was reborn on 15 March 1987 (the 'Ides of March'). As DMI and Corps Director, LtCol Beddie was directed by the CGS to conduct an intelligence review with the aim of recommending policy and procedures for the new Corps. LtCol Beddie was unable to complete this review before he retired from the Army; it was finished by Maj Kevin Arlidge in March 1989. The review was accepted as the way ahead for the NZIC by the APCC in 1990. The establishment of the Force Intelligence Group (ForInt) and School of Military Intelligence and Security (SMIS) was confirmed on 14 November 1990. In January 1992 SMIS moved to Waiouru on the direction of Army General Staff.
- In April 1992 the ForInt moved from Papakura Camp to HQ Land Force (LF) Command, then located in Byron Avenue, Takapuna, as part of the relocation of units from Papakura due to the proposed closure of Papakura Camp. The Force Intelligence Group moved again, in early 1998, on the closure of Land Force Command to Trentham Military Camp
- The British Intelligence Corps Insignia were worn by the NZIC from March 1991 until NZIC badges were issued in 1994. This arrangement was agreed to by the Colonel Commandants of both Corps and the CGS. The design of the current badge was based on the 1942 NZIC cap badge.
- Another Review of Army Intelligence was completed in 1992 which did little to change the organisation of the NZIC or its capabilities.
- In October 2011 SMIS moved from Waiouru Military Camp to Hokowhitu Campus, previously part of Massey University, Palmerston North.

A regimental dinner, known as the 'Red Tie Dinner', is held annually to celebrate to formation of the NZIC, usually on the weekend closest to the 'Ides of March'.

== Insignia and uniforms ==
The NZIC cap badge adopted in 1994 consists of bronze fern crossed leaves under the Queen's Crown, with "New Zealand" and "Intelligence Corps" appearing on two separate scrolls. A green/red/French grey stable belt is authorized for certain orders of dress. Officers formerly wore a mess uniform of scarlet jacket and blue/black trousers which included French grey facings, waistcoat and trouser stripes. This has however been phased out in favor of a universal pattern army mess dress with only the distinctive NZIC collar badges retained.

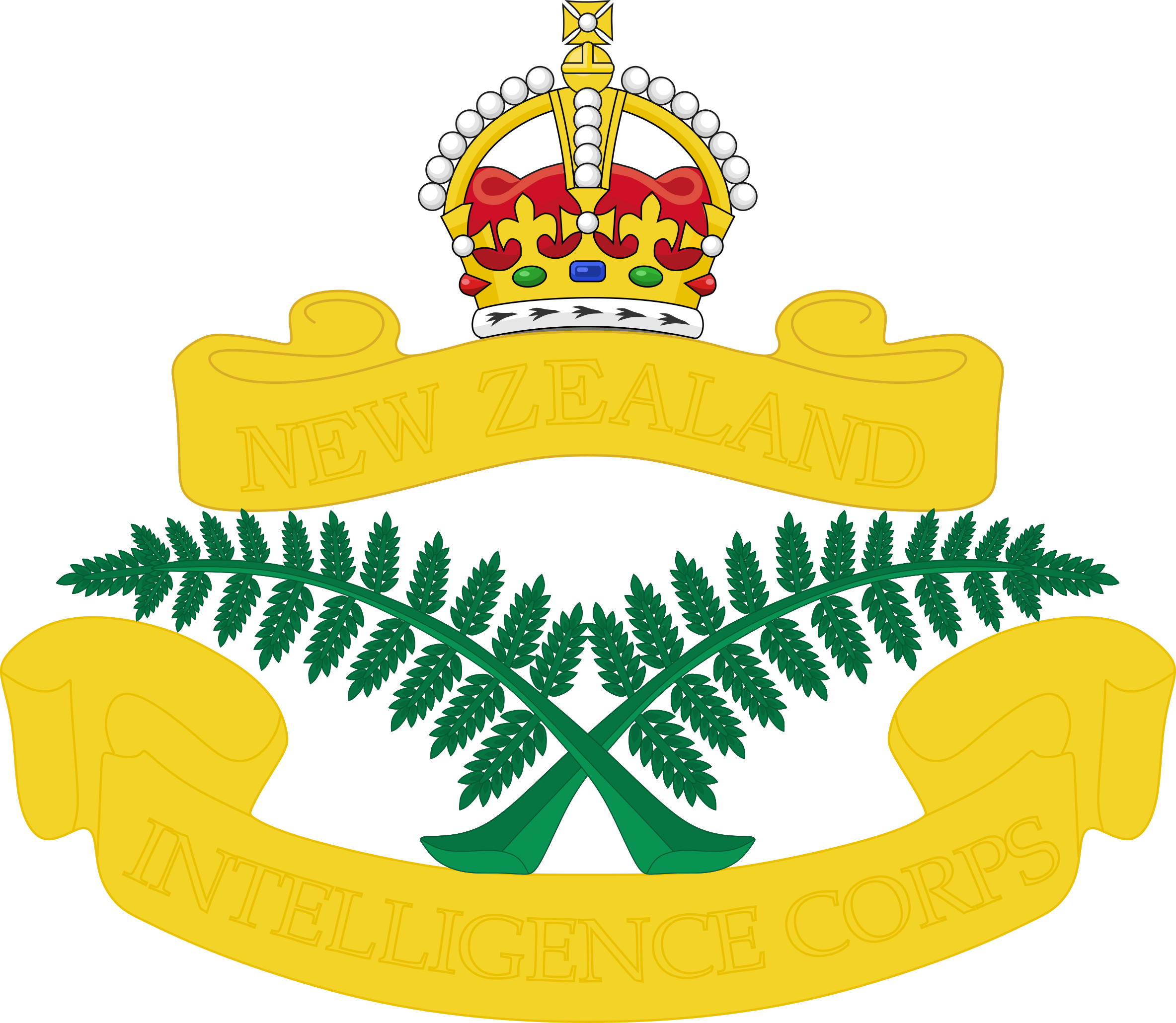

== Order of precedence ==
Preceded by New Zealand Special Air Service	New Zealand Army Order of Precedence	Succeeded by Royal New Zealand Army Logistic Regiment
