= School of Military Intelligence and Security =

The School of Military Intelligence and Security is the New Zealand Intelligence Corps (NZIC) school. It is currently located at Hokowhitu Campus, previously part of Massey University, Palmerston North. It is responsible for training NZIC personnel and other members of the New Zealand Defence Force in aspects of intelligence and security. The school offers courses in debriefing, tactical questioning, and human intelligence.

In 2012, there were six NZIC personnel based at SMIS.
