= 5th Division (New Zealand) =

- Active: 1941–1944
- Country: New Zealand
- Size: Division
- Part of: New Zealand Military Forces

Insignia
- Identification symbol: White kea head on a black background

The 5th Division, New Zealand Military Forces, was raised in the Southern Military District during the Second World War. It consisted of the 3rd and 10th Brigades and the 11th Brigade Group. It was disbanded after the danger of invasion from Japan receded. It appears to have been raised on 1 November 1941, and disbanded on 1 April 1944.

Infantry units included the 1st and 2nd Battalions of the Canterbury Regiment, the 1st and 3rd Battalions of the Nelson, Marlborough & West Coast Regiment, the 2nd Battalion New Zealand Scots (Westerfield, Sept 42 – July 1943), the 1st Battalion Southland Regiment, and the 3rd Battalion, Nelson Marlborough West Coast Regiment (Blenheim, January–June 1942).

In mid-1942, the division comprised:

- 11th Brigade Group: (around Blenheim)
  - 10th LAFV (NMMR)
  - 1st Battalion, NMWC Regiment
  - 3rd Battalion, NMWC Regiment
  - Troop of 130 Medium Battery, 19 Field Regiment NZA, 20 Anti-Tank Battery, 33 Field Company NZE, and ASC, 9 Res MT Company, and 11 Field Ambulance
- 3rd Infantry Brigade: (Burnham Camp(?))
  - 1st Battalion, Canterbury Regiment
  - 1st Battalion, Otago Regiment
  - 1st Battalion, Southland Regiment
- 10th Infantry Brigade: (Ashburton)
  - 2nd Battalion, Canterbury Regiment
  - 2nd Battalion, New Zealand Scottish Regiment
- Divisional Troops: Canterbury Yeomanry Cavalry (Ashburton), 103 Hy Bty, 130 Med Bty, 3 Field Regiment, 18 Field Regiment, 21 and 24 Anti-Tank Batteries, 3 & 32 Field Companies NZE, 40 Field Park Company NZE, 5 Divisional Signals
- Divisional Combat Service Support: Army Service Corps, 3 & 8 Reserve MT Companies, 3 & 15 Field Ambulance, 24 Mobile Workshop, 3 Provost Company

No. 22 Squadron RNZAF flew in support of the division in the army cooperation role.
