= Royal New Zealand Corps of Signals =

- Active: 1 June 1921 – present
- Country: New Zealand
- Allegiance: King of New Zealand
- Branch: New Zealand Army
- Role: Communication
- Garrison/HQ: Linton Military Camp
- Nickname: RNZSigs (abbreviation)
- Motto: Certa Cito
- March: Begone Dull Care
- Anniversaries: 1 June
- Engagements: First World War; Second World War; Korean War

Commanders
- Colonel-in-Chief: Anne, Princess Royal

The Royal New Zealand Signals Corps (RNZSigs) provides, co-ordinates and operates the communications networks of the New Zealand Army. The role of RNZSigs is to support other Arms by providing Communication Information System required for Command and Control of Units, Formations and Administrative installations in a theater of Operations and in the New Zealand support area. Modern signal equipment is essential to the army, demanding skilled operators and technicians. Because communications must be maintained even under the worst of conditions, signallers must be expert tradespeople. They must also accept a high degree of personal responsibility because the lives of soldiers can often rely on the fast and accurate transmission of battlefield information.

The Corps comprises systems engineers who configure and implement networks, information systems operators who maintain and operate networks, and communication system operators who operate all sorts of communications equipment and process signals traffic over voice and data circuits. The Corps consist of three regular squadrons and one reserve force squadron.

== History ==
Military signals became a component of the New Zealand Army in 1905 when signals detachment were attached to the Infantry and Cycle Corps. From that the Cycle and Signalling Corps was established in 1909 from the College Rifles Company in Auckland. On 5 October 1911, the Post and Telegraph Corps was formed from personnel in the Post and Telegraph Department. On 1 June 1921, the Post and Telegraph Corps became the New Zealand Corps of Signals, with attached depots in various parts of the country.

New Zealand had the following signal units that operated during the Second World War:

- 1st Divisional Signals
- 2nd Divisional Signals (served in North Africa and Italy)
- 3rd Divisional Signals (served in the Pacific Theatre)
- 4th Divisional Signals
- 5th Divisional Signals
- Northern District Signals
- Southern District Signals
- Central District Signals
- Army Signal Company

In 1945, J-Force Signal Company was sent to Japan as part of the British Commonwealth Occupation Force. King George VI gave the "Royal" prefix to the unit on 12 July 1947. The principal unit of the RNZCS from 1948 to 1964 was the 1st Divisional Signals Regiment, from which the following units were established after its disbandment:

- 1st Infantry Brigade Group Squadron
- 2nd Communication Zone Signal Squadron
- 3rd Infantry Brigade Group Squadron
- 1st Communication Zone Signal Squadron

A notable member of the RNZCS was Lieutenant Colonel Cyril Bassett, who was the only soldier serving with the New Zealand Expeditionary Force (NZEF) to be awarded the Victoria Cross (VC) in the Gallipoli Campaign of the First World War. Upon his death, his VC was gifted to the RNZSigs and is displayed at the Auckland War Memorial Museum.

== Structure ==
The RNZSig has the following structure:

- 1st Command Support Regiment
  - 1st Signal Squadron (Regular Force) – It is based in Palmerston North, Wellington and Christchurch. The Squadron consists of two troops from throughout the North and South Islands, many of which are ex regular force soldiers and officers. The primary role of the 1st Signal Squadron is to supplement the Regular force squadrons on exercises and operations.
  - 2 Signal Squadron (Regular Force) – It is based in Linton and includes three troops, Headquarters, and a Q-Store made up of Regular Force personnel.;
  - 3 Signals Squadron (Regular Force) – It is based in Burnham. It specializes in electronic warfare.
  - 4 Signal Squadron (Regular Force) – It is based in Burnham.
  - 25 Cypher Section (Regular Force) – It is based in Linton.

The corps school is known as the School of Signals and is located at Linton Military Camp, where both the Regular Force and Army Reserve personnel attend to attain qualification as a Royal New Zealand Signaller.

=== Pipe Band ===
The Pipe Band of the Royal New Zealand Corps of Signals Association, known simply as the Pipe Band of the Signals Association is a traditional Scottish pipe Band of the RNZCS, based in Auckland. It is part of the Army Reserve (Territorial Force), and is composed of part-time musicians. It is one of the only pipe bands in New Zealand that is allowed to parade in full traditional highland military uniform. The band was formed as the Band of the 1st Divisional Signal Regiment, which was approved on 15 October 1957. When the regiment was disbanded in 1964, the band became a civilian band and continued its association with the RNZCS, becoming the pipes and drums of the Signals Association based out of Auckland. The pipe major carries a banner that depicts the corps badge with gild scrolls that carry the title of Pipes and Drums of the Signal Association.

== Traditions and customs ==
The badge of The Royal New Zealand Corps of Signals consists of the Roman god Mercury, holding a caduceus and standing on a globe, with a Royal crown above and two scrolls below bearing the Corps motto "Certa Cito" (meaning "swift and sure"). The Corps wears a rifle green beret and a signals pattern belt on its uniform.

== See also ==
- Structure of the New Zealand Army
- Royal Corps of Signals
- Royal Canadian Corps of Signals
- Royal Australian Corps of Signals

== Order of precedence ==
Preceded by Corps of Royal New Zealand Engineers	New Zealand Army Order of Precedence	Succeeded by Royal New Zealand Infantry Regiment
