= 3rd Field Regiment, Royal New Zealand Artillery =

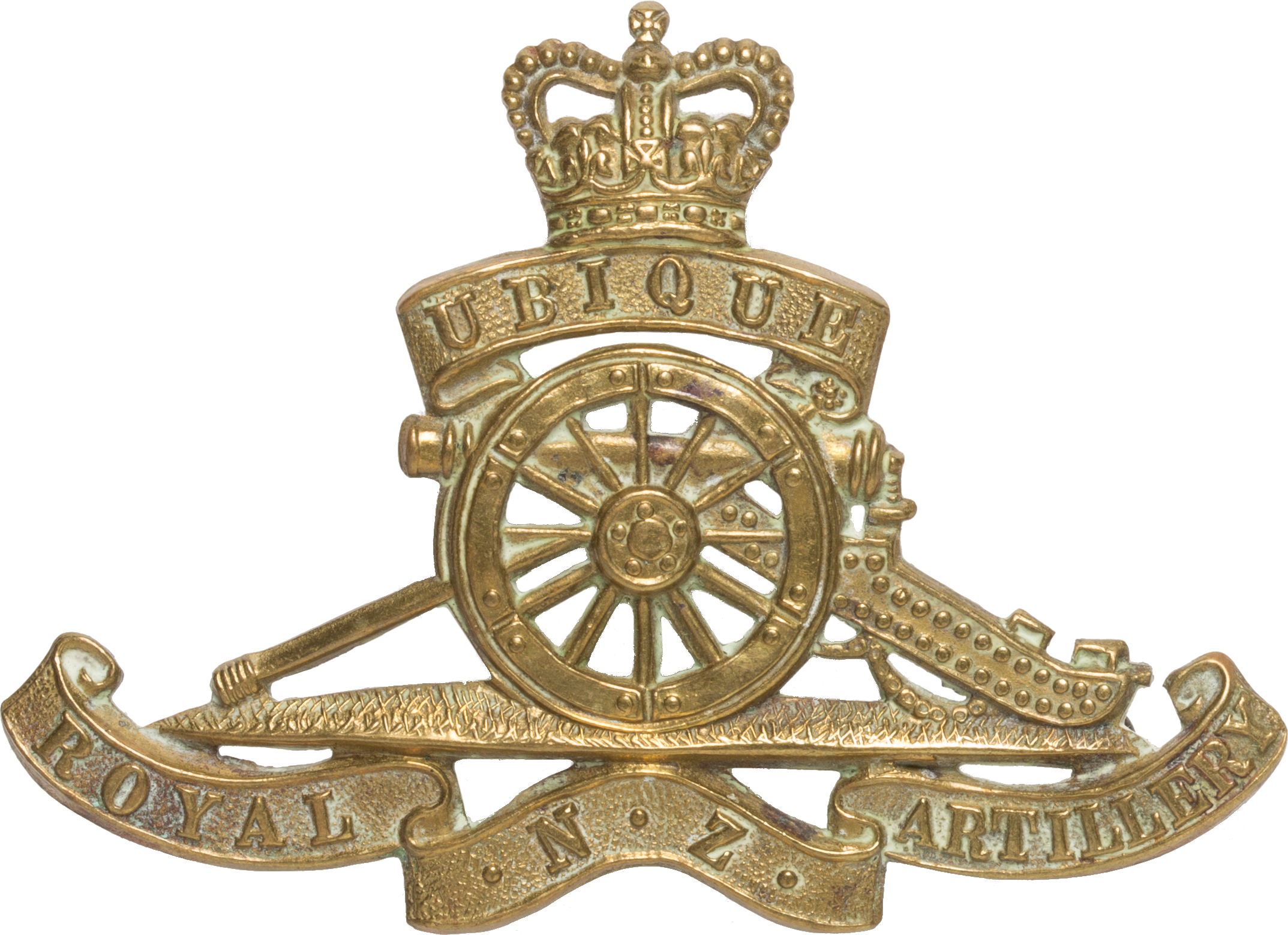
- Cap badge of the Royal New Zealand Artillery
- Active: 1921–1990
- Country: New Zealand
- Branch: New Zealand Army
- Type: Artillery
- Role: Field Artillery
- Size: Regiment
- Part of: Royal Regiment of New Zealand Artillery
- Garrison/HQ: Dunedin / Burnham
- Motto: Ubique (Everywhere) (Latin)

The 3rd Field Regiment, Royal New Zealand Artillery was a territorial force Field Artillery regiment of the New Zealand Army. The unit was formed in 1921 and consisted of the field artillery batteries based in the South Island. The regiment remained in New Zealand during the Second World War and was tasked with training reinforcements for 2nd New Zealand Expeditionary Force. The regiment was disbanded in 1990.

In 1921 a reorganisation of the New Zealand Military Forces saw the former Canterbury, and Otago Artillery Brigades amalgamated into the 3rd Artillery Brigade of the territorial New Zealand Artillery. The Regiment consisted of 9, 10, 11 and 12 batteries. 9, 11 and 12 Batteries were formed by retitling the former B, C and E batteries, which dated back to the 1860s, respectively, while 10 Battery was a new unit. 11 battery was disbanded on 1 June 1931 and in 1937 the brigade absorbed the 14th medium and 16th light batteries and was retitled as the 3rd Artillery Brigade group.

In 1940 the New Zealand artillery brigades were reconstituted into regiments in line with the contemporary reorganisation in the British Royal Artillery. The former batteries then became troops within new batteries. The old 9, 10 and 16 batteries were merged into the new 5 battery, while 10 and 14 batteries merged into the new 6 battery. The regiment was equipped with a mixture of 18-pounders, 3.7-inch howitzers and 4.5-inch howitzers. In November 1941 the regiment was expanded to three batteries and the batteries were redesignated as 9, 10 and 11 batteries and was reequipped with 25-pounders. During the Second World War the regiment remained in New Zealand as part of 5th Division and provided home defence as well as training for artillerymen to be sent overseas with the 2nd and 3rd New Zealand Divisions. In 1944 the territorial force was stood down and the regiment was reduced to a small regular force raining cadre.

In 1947 the New Zealand Army corps structure was reorganised and the territorial New Zealand Artillery was absorbed into the regular Royal New Zealand Artillery. The regiment was therefore retitled as 3rd Field Regiment, Royal New Zealand Artillery. The territorial force was reconstituted in 1948 and compulsory military training returned in 1950. From 1949 the regiment's batteries were retitled as 31, 32 and 33 Batteries.

The regiment continued to exist in this structure until the disbandment of 33 Battery in 1961. Later in 1971, 31 and 32 batteries were retitled as 31(B) and 32(E) batteries to reflect their earlier heritage as batteries of the Volunteer Force. In 1978 the regiment retired their 25-pounders and received new M101 howitzers.

3rd Field Regiment was disbanded in 1990, although 31(B) and 32(E) batteries would continue to exist until 1999 when they were absorbed into the Otago and Southland Regiment, and the Canterbury, and Nelson-Marlborough and West Coast Regiment, respectively.
