= Royal New Zealand Army Logistic Regiment =

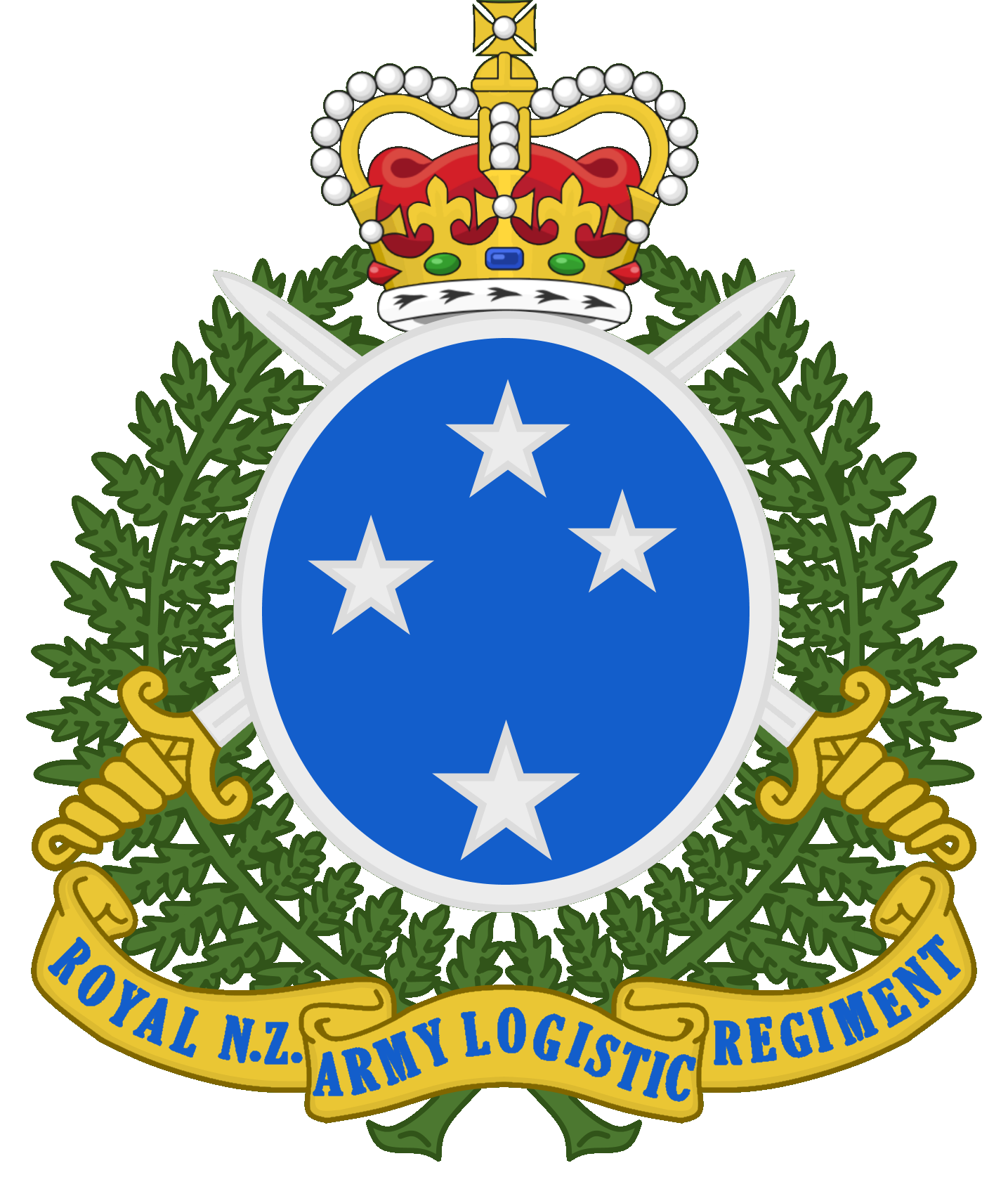
- Active: 9 December 1996 – Present
- Country: New Zealand
- Allegiance: HM The King
- Branch: New Zealand Army
- Role: Logistics
- Size: Two Battalions
- Nickname: RNZALR (abbreviation)
- Motto: Ma Nga Hua Tu Tangata
- March: Appreciation

The Royal New Zealand Army Logistic Regiment is the New Zealand Army's primary logistics and combat service support (CSS) unit. Formed in 1996, it consolidated three legacy Corps—Royal New Zealand Corps of Transport (RNZCT), Royal New Zealand Army Ordnance Corps (RNZAOC), and Royal New Zealand Electrical and Mechanical Engineers (RNZEME)—alongside the Army’s Quartermaster functions. It is the largest regiment in the New Zealand Army and provides critical sustainment to the New Zealand Defence Force (NZDF) across all domains—land, air, and sea.

== History ==
=== Origins ===
New Zealand's military logistics heritage dates to 1845, with ad hoc systems supporting British and colonial forces during the New Zealand Wars. The Defence Stores Department was established in 1862, followed by the New Zealand Army Service Corps (1910), New Zealand Army Ordnance Corps (1917), and later the New Zealand Electrical and Mechanical Engineers during the Second World War.

These three corps gained "Royal" status in 1947 in recognition of their wartime contributions and supported New Zealand’s post-war deployments in Korea, Southeast Asia, Vietnam, Somalia, and Bosnia.

=== Formation of the RNZALR ===
On 4 April 1996, Chief of the General Staff Major General Piers Reid initiated the formation of an integrated logistics regiment. The RNZALR was officially established on 9 December 1996. On that day, RNZCT, RNZAOC, and RNZEME personnel paraded at camps and bases across New Zealand, their corps flags were lowered, and they adopted the new RNZALR headdress and insignia.

The Regiment also incorporated Quartermaster (QM) personnel from across the Army, making it responsible not only for second-line logistics but also for unit-level sustainment and support.

== Structure ==
Currently the Regiment includes:

- 2 Combat Service Support Battalion (Linton Military Camp)
  - 10 Transport Company
  - 21 Supply Company
  - 2 Workshop Company
  - 5 Movements Company
  - 38 Combat Service Support Company (NZ Army Reserve)
  - Combat Service Support Company (North) (Papakura Military Camp)
- 3 Combat Service Support Battalion (Burnham Military Camp)
  - 3 Transport Company
  - 3 Catering & Supply Company
  - 3 Workshop Company
  - 3 Reserve Company (NZ Army Reserve)

Both battalions fall under the 1st (New Zealand) Brigade.

In addition to these units, RNZALR personnel are embedded across most NZ Army and NZDF units, supporting intelligence, signals, engineers, medical, combat, and special forces with 1st-line logistics.

== Trades ==
The RNZALR includes eleven trades providing various support functions within the NZ Army and across the New Zealand Defence Force (NZDF).

=== Ammunition Technicians ===
Ammunition Technicians provide support for the inspection, maintenance and disposal of all ammunition and explosives used by the New Zealand Army. This also includes civil NZ's Explosive Ordnance Disposal (EOD) capability.

=== Combat Drivers ===
Combat Driver operate transport from light to heavy vehicles carrying stores or troops.

=== Hospitality ===
The hospitality trades ensure that the forces are sustained with a balanced diet in garrison and field environments. the Hospitality trade consists of two trades;.

- Chef
- Steward

=== Maintenance Support Trades ===
There are five Maintenance support trades;

- Armourer
- Automotive Technician
- Electrical Fitter
- Electronics Technician
- Maintenance Fitter

These trades are responsible for the repair and general maintenance of all the Army's equipment. This includes vehicles, radios, night vision devices, general engineering, electrical components and weapons.

=== Movement Operators ===
Movement Operators work across all the three services facilitating the movement and support of troops and equipment. The Movement Operator trade consists of three specialties:

- Movement control - the planning and executing of the movement of personnel, vehicles and equipment by road, sea or air.
- Terminal Operations - the management of the loading, unloading and transit of forces by road, sea and air. Terminal Operations include stevedoring and port operations.
- Aerial Delivery - the Air Dispatch and Movement control of troops and equipment by aircraft including the rigging of stores for delivery by parachute or as under slung loads underneath helicopters.

=== Logistic Specialists ===
The senior trade within the RNZALR, Logistic Specialists, are responsible for delivering Supply & Quartermaster support. This support encompasses the provision, accounting, and management of ammunition, fuel, rations, weapons, general stores, spare parts, vehicles, and any other mission-critical equipment needed by the NZDF, whether in New Zealand or overseas.

== Traditions ==
=== The Duke of York's Own ===
On 22 June 1999, the Regimental Colonel of the RNZALR, Lt Col D.H Watmuff received notification that the Queen had approved the appellation "The Duke of York's Own" to the RNZALR. The title reflected the role of Prince Andrew, Duke of York, who served as the Colonel-in-Chief from 1996 until January 2022. With Prince Andrew's military affiliations removed by the Queen in January 2022, the use of the appellation "The Duke of York's Own" was ceased by the RNZALR.

=== Regiment Banner ===
The Prince Andrew Banner is an outward sign of the Regiment’s heritage, an acknowledgement of the important role it performs today, and the role its predecessors performed with courage and resilience in the past. The Banner represents the focal point for the traditions, loyalty and spirit of the RNZALR. Presentation of the Prince Andrew Banner by the Colonel in Chief, Royal New Zealand Logistic Regiment, His Royal Highness Prince Andrew on 16 Nov 1998 in Palmerston North.

=== The RNZALR Badge ===
The RNZALR was to amalgamate not only the RNZCT, RNZAOC and RNZEME Corps but also All Arms Storeman trade personnel from across all Corps and Regiments of the New Zealand Army. To break down the resistance to the new Regiment and extinguish the perceived traits of tribalism that existed among the corps and trades about to be amalgamated, a neutral badge was to be adopted. Following a design competition encompassing 110 designs, a design with no connection to the forming Corps and that was acceptable to the Herald of Arms was selected and approved on 21 October 1996.

The RNZALR badge consists of the following elements;

- A set of green ferns unique to New Zealand providing the main body,
- Crossed Swords representing the Army supporting an oval shield.
- The oval shield has a blue background displaying the stars of the Southern Cross. The Southern Cross is an identifier long associated with New Zealand Army logistics in that it was used as an identifier by;
  - 2nd New Zealand Expeditionary Force non-divisional vehicles, primary logistics at Maadi in 1942
  - The Logistic Support Group from the 1960s
  - Headquarters Support Command up to the early 1990s
- A riband embossed with “Royal N.Z Army Logistic Regiment.”
- All surmounted with a St Edwards Crown, which represents the ties to the Monarch.

== See also ==
- United States Army Logistics Branch
- Royal Logistic Corps
- Royal Australian Army Ordnance Corps
- Royal Canadian Logistics Service
- Disbanded Parent Corps
  - Royal New Zealand Corps of Transport
  - Royal New Zealand Army Ordnance Corps
  - Royal New Zealand Electrical and Mechanical Engineers

== Order of precedence ==
Preceded by New Zealand Intelligence Corps	New Zealand Army Order of Precedence	Succeeded by Royal New Zealand Army Medical Corps

== Sources ==
- Bolton, J. S., A history of The Royal New Zealand Army Ordnance Corps (Trentham: The Corps, 1992) (FR)
- Cooke, P. Warrior Craftsmen: Royal New Zealand Electrical & Mechanical Engineers 1942-1996 (Defence of New Zealand Study Group, 2016)
- Cape, P., Craftsmen in uniform: the Corps of Royal New Zealand Electrical and Mechanical Engineers: an account (Wellington: Corps of Royal New Zealand Electrical and Mechanical Engineers, c 1976) (FR)
- Millen Julia, Salute To Service: A History of the Royal New Zealand Corps of Transport 1860–1996

Preceded by Royal New Zealand Corps of Transport; Royal New Zealand Army Ordnance Corps; Royal New Zealand Electrical and Mechanical Engineers	Royal New Zealand Army Logistic Regiment; 1996 - Present	Succeeded by incumbent
