= Royal New Zealand Electrical and Mechanical Engineers =

New Zealand Electrical and Mechanical Engineers Royal New Zealand Electrical and Mechanical Engineers
- Active: 1942–1945 (2NZEF); 1946-1996
- Country: New Zealand
- Branch: New Zealand Army
- Motto: Arte Et Marte

The Royal New Zealand Electrical and Mechanical Engineers (RNZEME) was a New Zealand Army Corps comprising Army trained tradesmen (craftsmen) who repaired Army equipment wherever New Zealand Forces served.

Prior to 1946 NZEME functions were carried out by;

- New Zealand Army Ordnance Corps, consisting of
  - Ordnance Workshops, responsible for the repair of all armaments, instruments, wireless, radar and general stores were controlled by the Chief Ordnance Mechanical Officer,
  - Armourers Workshops, responsible for the repair of small arms and machine Guns were controlled by the Director Of Ordnance Services (DOS)
- The MT Branch responsible for the provision, storage, issue of all classes of vehicles and spare parts and the repair of such vehicles was controlled by the Director of Mechanical Transport.
- Light Aid Detachments and Workshops as part of the New Zealand Army Service Corps

The New Zealand Electrical and Mechanical Engineers(NZEME) were created as a separate corps in New Zealand on 1 September 1946 under the control of the Director of Mechanical Engineering. Control of MT Sores was retained under Ordnance Control. During WW2 in 2NZEF in the Middle east, NZEME had been formed in 1942 to keep the organisation in line with the British Army which was providing support at the time.

In 1947 the Royal prefix was awarded to NZEME creating the Royal New Zealand Electrical and Mechanical Engineers (RNZEME).

During the Vietnam War in 1964 the New Zealand government initially deployed some non-combat engineers to help with construction projects, some of whom were from RNZEME. In 1965 161 Battery Royal New Zealand Artillery was deployed to Vietnam and a detachment of RNZEME engineers formed the Logistic Support Element (LSE) to service the battery. 161 Battery served under the U.S 173rd Airborne Brigade from 1965 to 1966. When the 1st Australian Task Force was formed in 1966 and established at Nui Dat in Phuoc Tuy Province, the LSE was detached from the battery and established within the 1st Australian Logistic Support Group (1 ALSG) at Vung Tau. NZEME personnel who had been in the LSE were taken for the most part into the Light Aid Detachment (LAD) of the Australian Artillery Field Regiment. RNZEME tradesmen also served with the New Zealand Services Medical Team in the town of Bong Son, in the Binh Dinh Province. Some RNZEME personnel served in the RNZIR rifle companies, the ANZAC Battalions (Command & Support), as well as at the New Zealand headquarters (V Force HQ) in Saigon. Several RNZEME personnel also served in the 1st New Zealand Army Training Team (1 NZATTV) which helped train South Vietnamese soldiers, in 1971.

RNZEME personnel were attached to combat arms regiments, including the infantry, armour, and artillery. These attachments were known as Light Aid Detachments (LAD’s) who in turn were supported by Field Workshops. Field workshops were located in Burnham, Linton Army Camp, Waiouru, Papakura and Singapore (until 1989). Field Workshops were in turn supported by a Base Workshop located in Trentham.

Due to New Zealand Defence Force restructuring, in 1996 the RNZEME was amalgamated along with the Royal New Zealand Army Ordnance Corps (RNZAOC) and Royal New Zealand Corps of Transport (RNZCT) into the Royal New Zealand Army Logistic Regiment (RNZALR).

== See also ==
- Royal Electrical and Mechanical Engineers (REME)
- Royal Australian Electrical and Mechanical Engineers (RAEME)
- Corps of Royal Canadian Electrical and Mechanical Engineers (RCEME)
- United States Army Ordnance Corps
- New Zealand Tunnelling Company

== Resources ==
- Craftsmen in Uniform: The Corps of Royal New Zealand Electrical and Mechanical Engineers, Peter Cape, 1976, Wellington
- Warrior Craftsmen: Royal New Zealand Electrical and Mechanical Engineers, 1942-1996, Peter Cooke, 2017, Wellington

Preceded by New Zealand Electrical and Mechanical Engineers	Royal New Zealand Electrical and Mechanical Engineers; 1947 - 1996	Succeeded by Royal New Zealand Army Logistic Regiment
