= Support Command (New Zealand) =

Support Command was a support formation of the New Zealand Army. It was active from 1984 to 1998.

Following the 1983 Defence Review, the New Zealand Army restructured to delineate operational commands from support and training functions. This led to the creation of Support Command, comprising:

- Army Training Group in Waiouru
- Force Maintenance Group (FMG) based in Linton

Base Area Wellington (BAW) located in Trentham. There was an internal reorganisation within the Army General Staff, and New Zealand Land Forces Command at Byron Avenue in Takapuna, North Shore, was split into a Land Force Command and a Support Command. Support Command from then on comprised three elements, the Army Training Group in Waiouru, the Force Maintenance Group (FMG) based in Linton, and Base Area Wellington (BAW) based in Trentham, and assumed responsibility for individual training, third line logistics and base support.

The Force Maintenance Group of 19 units was designed to provide logistical support to both the Rapid Reaction Force (a battalion plus group) and the Integrated Expansion Force (brigade sized).

In 1985 the command's units were listed as two field squadrons (one TF, one RF/TF), at Linton and Petone, one engineer support squadron at Linton (25 ESS), one signals squadron (RF/TF) at Linton, one transport regiment (integrated RF/TF) at Linton, one general hospital at Linton, two RNZAOC supply companies at Linton and Waiouru, 1 Base Supply Battalion at Trentham, 2 independent workshops (Waiouru and Linton), one base workshop at Trentham, one engineer workshop at Linton, the School of Military Engineering at Linton, the Military Police School at Trentham, and the RNZAOC Ordnance School at Trentham, plus three camp headquarters at Linton, Trentham, and Fort Dorset.

Later on the command's responsibility were described as the provision of individual training, equipment management, static support, and base support, and command of the Army Training Group (Waiouru) and 5th Base Logistics Group (Trentham).

The headquarters was initially at Palmerston North, but was moved to the Messines complex at Trentham in the 1990–1992 period. Brigadier Graham Birch commanded the formation about this time period.

Headquarters Support Command was disestablished in mid-1998, with the Army's training and support systems being transferred to the newly established Headquarters Land Command (New Zealand) and management of logistic and support functions going to Logistics Executive within the Army General Staff.
