= Royal New Zealand Corps of Transport =

New Zealand Army Service Corps Royal New Zealand Army Service Corps Royal New Zealand Army Corps of Transport
- Active: 1910–1996
- Allegiance: New Zealand
- Branch: New Zealand Army
- Role: Movements, Transport and Catering
- Motto: Nil Sine Labore
- March: Wait for the Wagon
- Anniversaries: 12 May

Commanders
- Colonel in Chief: Princess Alice, Dutchess of Gloucester, CI, GCB, GCVO, GBE

The Royal New Zealand Corps of Transport (RNZCT) was a corps within the New Zealand Army that provided logistical support to combat and combat support elements of the Army. Tracing its history back to 1910 when the New Zealand Army Service Corps (NZASC) was formed, as the RNZCT the corps was formed in 1979, when the NZASC was disbanded. Since 1979, the corps has been reorganised several times, undertaking a variety of roles before being subsumed into the Royal New Zealand Army Logistic Regiment in 1996.

== History ==
The New Zealand Gazette of 12 May 1910 advised that the New Zealand Army Service Corps (NZASC) was formed and became a fully designated component of the defence forces of New Zealand. In 1946 the prefix "Royal" was approved in recognition of the Royal New Zealand Army Service Corps' (RNZASC) service during the 1939–45 war and the occupation of Japan.

Although overshadowed by 16 Field Regiment RNZA's contribution to the 1950–54 Korean War, New Zealand also contributed 10 Company, RNZASC as part of Kayforce. Totalling 408 personnel of all ranks it served with distinction in Korea from 1951 until 1956 as part of the 1st Commonwealth Division. 10 Company was organised as follows:

- Company Headquarters
- A (Able) Platoon
- B (Baker) Platoon
- C (Charlie) Platoon
- Composite Platoon
- Workshop Platoon

On 12 May 1979, the RNZASC ceased to exist and the responsibilities of road, transport, air dispatch, postal functions and catering were handed over to the Royal New Zealand Corps of Transport (RNZCT) who were formed on 12 May 1979. The responsibilities of provision of foodstuffs and POL (petrol oil lubricants) was handed over to the Royal New Zealand Army Ordnance Corps (RNZAOC).

From 1974 to 1989 the RNZASC/RNZCT provided the New Zealand Transport Squadron and a Catering Platoon to the New Zealand Force South East Asia in Singapore. The demographics of the RNZCT personnel were 70% Caterers, 25% Transport and 5% Movements.

On 9 December 1996 the RNZCT was disbanded and was absorbed into the Royal New Zealand Army Logistic Regiment (RNZALR).

== Corps history ==
The Corps' history is covered in the book "Salute To Service: A History Of The Royal New Zealand Corps Of Transport And Its Predecessors, 1860–1996", by Julia Millen; Victoria University Press, Wellington, 1997; ISBN 0-86473-324-0.

== RNZCT Association ==
The RNZCT Association was formed on 31 March 1994 to:

- Support and protect the interests of members, promote good fellowship and maintain contact with, and between, members.
- Arrange and conduct reunions at national level.
- Assist in the establishment and advancement of Branches.
- Be supportive of any Association member who may be in need.
- Encourage historical research of the corps and to collect and preserve historical artifacts.

Eligibility for membership of the RNZCT Association extends to all who have worn the badge of the NZASC, RNZASC or RNZCT. In order to promote the interests of the Corps, the Association needs maximum support from both serving ex-Corps personnel and retired Corps personnel.

== RNZASC & RNZCT Facebook ==
The RNZASC & RNZCT has an active Facebook Group, Royal NZ Army Service Corps & Corps of Transport where members keep in touch, share photos and organise events.

Preceded by Royal New Zealand Army Service Corps	Royal New Zealand Corps of Transport; 1979–1996	Succeeded by Royal New Zealand Army Logistic Regiment
