= Norman Joseph Levien =

Norman Joseph Levien, OBE
- Born: 8 June 1871; London
- Died: 22 January 1967 (aged 95); Auckland
- Military career
- Allegiance: New Zealand
- Branch: New Zealand Army
- Rank: Major
- Service number: 12/131
- Conflicts: First World War; Gallipoli campaign
- Awards: Member of the Most Excellent Order of the British Empire; 1914–1915 Star; British War Medal (1914–1920); Victory Medal with oak leaf

Norman Joseph Levien OBE (1871–1967) was a New Zealand Army Officer and a foundation member of the New Zealand Army Ordnance Corps who served in Egypt, Gallipoli and Europe during the First World War.

== Early life ==
Born in 1871, Levien attended Nelson College 1887–88. In the period 1896–1914 he was employed as a clerk in Wellington, a flaxmiller in the Manawatu and a commercial traveller based out of Auckland.

== Military career ==
On the outbreak of the 1st World War Levien enlisted into the 3rd Auckland Regiment as a Temporary Sergeant, transferred to the Ordnance Department as the IC of Stores and Equipment and assisted in equipping the troops for overseas service.

Levien embarked with the main body, departing Wellington on 3 December 1914 on the troopship TSS Maunganui.

On arrival in Egypt, Levien was for a short period was attached to the British Ordnance department at the Citadel in Cairo for familiarisation with the ordnance systems and procedures in use at the time.

Promoted into the NZAOC as a 2nd Lieutenant on 3 April 1915, Levien was the Officer In Charge of Equipment, Small Arms and Accoutrements (SAA) and Clothing and was in a pivotal role equipping the forces in the Dardanelles. In Alexandra he established a New Zealand Ordnance Depot at No. 12 Rue de la, Porte Rosette and a warehouse at Shed 43, Alexandra Docks.

Levien embarked for the Dardanelles on 2 August 1915, where he replaced Captain Beck as the Deputy Assistant Director of Ordnance Services(DADOS) for the Australian and New Zealand Division and was promoted to Lieutenant on 6 October 1915. Redeployed to Mudros on 28 November 1915, Levien became the Chief Ordnance Officer at Sarpi camp responsible for reequipping the now depleted Australian and New Zealand Division. On the evacuation of the Dardanelles Levien returned to Alexandra for the reorganisation of the New Zealand Division for operations in France.

As the NZ Division departed for France, Levien remained in Egypt to close and adjust the Divisions stores accounts, disposed of unserviceable stores by Auction and handed over all remaining ordnance stores to the Imperial Ordnance organisation. Closing the depot he had established in Alexandra, Levien embarked for England on 10 May 1916.

Attached to the Headquarters of the NZ Division, Levien was Promoted to Captain appointed the Chief Ordnance Officer for the NZEF in the United Kingdom where he organised and established Ordnance depots at all training camps and Hospitals throughout England.

In 1917 Levien was attached to the Woolwich Arsenal and the Army Clothing Depot at Pimlico for 6 and 4 week respectively where he was taught the basics of ammunition construction and methods of accounting and issuing ordnance stores. On his return he then inaugurated new and improved systems which was approved by the NZ HQ and distributed to all commands to become the basis of future Ordnance services in the NZEF for the remainder of its existence. Promoted to Major, levien was then posted to Sling Camp.

For his services during the war, Levien was appointed a Member of the Order of the British Empire (MBE) in the 1919 New Year Honours, and promoted to Officer of the Order of the British Empire (OBE) later that year in the King's Birthday Honours.

Levien was demobilised from the NZEF in 1919 and embarked for his return to New Zealand on 3 November 1919.

== After the war ==
Post war Levien was the manager of the Sunshine health camp for 7 years and during WW2 he was the manager of the Corrie soldiers hostel and spent time as the assistant manager of the Commercial hotel in Hamilton, Levien was also a Justice of the Peace (JP).

Levien died in 1967 at 95 years of age.

== Honours and awards ==
- Officer of the Most Excellent Order of the British Empire
- Member of the Most Excellent Order of the British Empire
- 1914–15 Star
- British War Medal (1914–1920)
- Victory Medal with oak leaf

== See also ==
- New Zealand Defence Stores Department
- New Zealand Army Ordnance Department
- New Zealand Army Ordnance Corps
- Royal New Zealand Army Ordnance Corps
