= Thomas Joseph King (army officer) =

New Zealand brigadier (1891–1971)

- Born: 19 April 1891; Milton, New Zealand
- Died: 28 December 1971 (aged 80); Wellington, New Zealand
- Burial place: Karori Cemetery, Wellington, New Zealand
- Military career
- Allegiance: New Zealand
- Branch: New Zealand Army
- Rank: Brigadier
- Service number: WWI 15/56; WWII 6192
- Unit: New Zealand Army Ordnance Corps
- Awards: Commander of the Order of the British Empire

Thomas Joseph King, CBE, (19 April 1891 – 28 December 1971) was a senior officer in the New Zealand Military Forces and a foundation member of the New Zealand Army Ordnance Corps who served in both world wars.

== Early life ==
King was born at Milton on 19 April 1891. After completing his education, he started work in 1909 with the Treasury Department and later transferred to the Marine Department.

== Military career ==
In 1909, King joined the New Zealand Volunteer Forces, serving in the Civil Service Rifles. When the Volunteer Forces were restructured the following year into the Territorial Force, he served in the Wellington Regiment. On the outbreak of the First World War, King enlisted into the New Zealand Expeditionary Force (NZEF) and was posted to its headquarters as a private in the Pay Department. King embarked with the main body of the NZEF, departing Wellington on 3 December 1914 on the troopship TSS Mauganui. On arrival in Egypt, he was promoted to sergeant and on 3 April 1915 was promoted into the New Zealand Army Ordnance Corps (NZAOC) as a second lieutenant.

King saw service in the Dardanelles as the Deputy Assistant Director of Ordnance Services (DADOS) for the New Zealand and Australian Division and was promoted to lieutenant on 6 October 1915. Struck down with illness King was invalided back to New Zealand in May 1916.

Returning to New Zealand, King was employed with the New Zealand Defence Stores Department in a "temporary" capacity prior to being appointed permanently to the New Zealand Army Ordnance Department (NZAOD) on 1 April 1917. During this time King completed examinations in accountancy and also qualified by examination as a solicitor. In 1924 the NZAOD was merged with the NZAOC and King was appointed Director of Ordnance Services (DOS) of the NZAOC, a position he would hold until 1940.

=== Second World War ===
When World War II started King was seconded to the 2NZEF, New Zealand Ordnance Corps (NZOC) from the NZAOC as a lieutenant colonel and appointed as the DADOS HQ 2nd New Zealand Division and sailed with the first echelon.

Arriving in England in early June 1940, King proceeded to inspect the proposed locations of the New Zealand camps and liaise with the RAOC the necessary arrangements to equip the New Zealand Division, arrangements which were hampered by a severe shortage of equipment caused by the British Expeditionary Forces withdrawal from France and the impending German invasion of the United Kingdom. The events of the war cause the NZEF in the UK to be sent to the Middle East in 1941 with all their equipment and on 1 January 1942 King was appointed Deputy Director Ordnance Service (DDOS)HQ NZ Div.

Briefly attached to the 8th Army from 2 June 1942 King was promoted to colonel on 1 August 1941 and formally relinquished his position of DDOS HQ NZ Div on 18 July 1942 and became the DDOS LofC 8th Army, responsible for the supervision of all Ordnance and Ammunition depots in Egypt and the control of ordnance shipping into and out of the Middle East. On 18 August 1942 was posted to the 9th Army as DDOS.

On the liberation of Greece by the 9th Army in 1944, king as DDOS was responsible for the military supply organisation and for the relief of the population of Greece. King was aware of the hardships faced by the Greek people as a result of assisting hundreds of New Zealand soldiers during the earlier Greek campaign, and convinced the NZ Govt to provide a shipload of foodstuffs directly to Greece from New Zealand for use in children's homes and hospitals and other institutions a gesture that was greatly appreciated by the Greeks.

Returning on leave to New Zealand in May 1945 King was one of the New Zealand Army Brigadiers suggested as a replacement for Lieutenant General Edward Puttick who had reached retiring age. In August 1945 King was then seconded as the disposed persons administrator to the United Nations Relief and Rehabilitation Administration (UNRRA) as part of the post war reconstruction of Europe effort in returning refugees to their homes either in Austria or in Germany.

== Postwar ==
King retired from the military on his return from Germany in 1947. Already well known in New Zealand sports circles, King took an active part in Rugby football administration as a member of both the Wellington and the New Zealand Rugby Unions. King retained his connection with the NZAOC and RNZAOC by remaining in the post of Colonel commandant until 31 March 1961, a position he had held since 1 January 1941.

== Honours and awards ==
- Officer of the Order of the British Empire in the 1941 New Year Honours
- Commander of the Order of the British Empire in 1945
- 1914–15 Star
- British War Medal (1914–1920)
- Victory Medal with oak leaf
- Africa Star

== See also ==
- New Zealand Defence Stores Department
- New Zealand Army Ordnance Department
- New Zealand Army Ordnance Corps
- Royal New Zealand Army Ordnance Corps
