= Hamley =

Hamley may refer to:

People:

- Bob Hamley, the former head coach of the Colorado Mammoth of the National Lacrosse League
- Edward Bruce Hamley KCB KCMG (1824–1893), British general, military writer, Conservative politician
- Edward Hamley (poet) (1764 (baptised) – 1834), English clergyman and poet
- Francis Hamley (1815–1876), British Army officer who administered the South Australian government from 1868 to 1869
- Frederick George Hamley (1903–1975), United States Circuit Judge of the United States Court of Appeals for the Ninth Circuit
- John Martin Hamley (1883–1942), Democrat in the Louisiana House of Representatives
- Joseph Erin Hamley (1985–2006), an unarmed man fatally shot by Arkansas State Trooper Larry P. Norman
- Joseph Osbertus Hamley (1820–1911), Head of the British Army Military Store Department during the New Zealand Wars
- William Hamley (b. 18th century), British founder of Hamleys, one of the largest toy stores in the world
- Wymond Ogilvy Hamley (1818–1907), English-Canadian collector of customs and politician
- Molly Hamley-Clifford (1887–1956), British stage and film actress

Places:

- County of Hamley, cadastral unit in the Australian state of South Australia
- Hamley, South Australia, locality in the Australian state of South Australia
- Hamley Bridge, South Australia, community in South Australia
- Hamley Building in the list of historic places in Victoria, British Columbia
- Hamley Run, Ohio, unincorporated community in Athens County, in the U.S. state of Ohio

Companies:

- Hamleys the largest toy retailer in world.

== See also ==
- Hambley
- Hamersley (disambiguation)
