= Thomas James McCristell =

- Born: 26 November 1873; Newbridge, Kildare, Ireland
- Died: 7 November 1946 (aged 68); Wellington, New Zealand
- Military career
- Allegiance: New Zealand
- Branch: New Zealand Army
- Service years: 1891–1920
- Rank: Lieutenant colonel
- Units: Royal Inniskilling Fusiliers; Wellington Rifle Volunteers; 17th Wellington Regiment; Defence Stores Department; New Zealand Army Ordnance Department
- Awards: Order of the British Empire; India Medal; Queen's South Africa Medal

Thomas James McCristell (1873–1946) was a professional soldier of the British and New Zealand Army, who served in India, South Africa who progressed through the ranks to become the Head of the New Zealand Army Ordnance Corps and New Zealand Army Ordnance Department on their formation in 1917.

== Early life and British Army Service ==
A native of Newbridge, County Kildare in Ireland, born on 26 November 1873, McCristell enlisted at an early age into the Royal Inniskilling Fusiliers. Serving with the 2nd Battalion, McCristell saw active service in India, taking part in the Tirah Campaign of 1897.

Serving in South Africa from 1899, McCristell served in the Transvaal and Orange River Colony operations between November 1900 and May 1901 and in late 1902 McCristell departed for New Zealand on the steamer Whakatane.

== New Zealand Service ==
Arriving in Wellington, McCristell was soon living in Denniston and active in the local Volunteer Forces. By 1909 he had attained the rank of Staff Sergeant Major in the 5th Battalion of the Wellington Rifle Volunteers and providing instruction from Featherston in the south to Woodville in the North. In March 1911 McCristell was appointed as a Sergeant Major in the Permanent Forces in the position of Area Non Commissioned Officer in the Wairarapa region.

Early in 1913 the Defence Department made available seven commissions for the New Zealand Staff Corps (NZSC). McCristell was one of eighteen NCO candidates and one of the first seven to receive a commission in the NZSC, and by March had been promoted to Lieutenant. McCristell was appointed Adjutant to the 2nd Battalion, 17th Wellington Regiment in April 1913. In December 1913 sat the examination board for promotion to Captain, and promoted in February March 1914.

With the mass mobilisation of New Zealand Forces McCristell was appointed as the Camp Quartermaster for Trentham Camp, where he was responsible for the housing and feeding of several thousand new recruits. In April 1916 McCristell was appointed as Major James O'Sullivan's successor as Director of Equipment and Ordnance Stores. Defence Stores Department at Buckle Street, Wellington.

In 1917 the decision was made that after close to 50 years service to the nation, on 1 April 1917 the Department would be replaced with a New Zealand Army Ordnance Corps (NZAOC) and a New Zealand Army Ordnance Department (NZAOD).

The NZAOD and NZAOC were gazetted on 1 February 1917, The effect placed the Defence Stores staff and those handling military equipment and stores in the districts and training camps on a straight-out military footing, the same as in the British Army. McCristell assumed the role as the Head of the new Ordnance Department and Ordnance Corps.

Over the next few years McCristell continued to develop the new Ordnance organisations, developing the relationship between Ordnance and Quartermasters to improve accountability and was instrumental in the organising of resources in the wake of the influenza outbreak. In 1919 he was made an Officer of the Order of the British Empire (OBE) for his efforts. McCristell was also appointed to the demobilisation committee in anticipation of the return of the NZEF on the competition of the war.

On 14 February 1920 Lieutenant Colonel H. E. Pilkington was appointed Staff Officer for the Ordnance Services effectively replacing McCristell as the Director of Equipment and Ordnance Stores, with the new title Director of Ordnance Stores. McCristell was promoted to Lieutenant-Colonel, and appointed Chief Ordnance Officer (COO) for the Dominion. On 30 April 1920 McCristell relinquished the position of COO, was placed on to the reserve of officers (temporary). Transferred into the New Zealand Audit Department on 1 May 1920, McCristell was sent to Samoa as part of a parliamentary commission to provided advice to Samoa, with McCristell's role to advise on Departmental organisation. Placed in to the Reserve of Officer (General List) on 1 December 1920, McCristell would remain the Reserve List of Officers until his death on 7 November 1947.

== Family ==
McCristell married Ellen Spence on 6 February 1910 at Woodville, New Zealand, and had three children; Thomas (8 Apr 1912), Mary (17 Oct 1913) and Nancy (27 Aug 1916).
