= 1941 New Year Honours (New Zealand) =

Annual awards for New Zealanders

The 1941 New Year Honours in New Zealand were appointments by King George VI to various orders and honours in recognition of war service by New Zealanders. The awards celebrated the passing of 1940 and the beginning of 1941, and were announced on 1 January 1941. No civilian awards were made.

The recipients of honours are displayed here as they were styled before their new honour.

== Order of the British Empire ==
=== Commander (CBE) ===
Military division, additional

- Acting Air Commodore Charles Roderick Carr DFC AFC – Royal Air Force.
- Group Captain Arthur de Terrotte Nevill – Royal New Zealand Air Force.
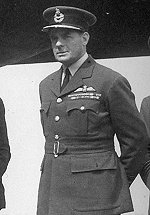
Roderick Carr

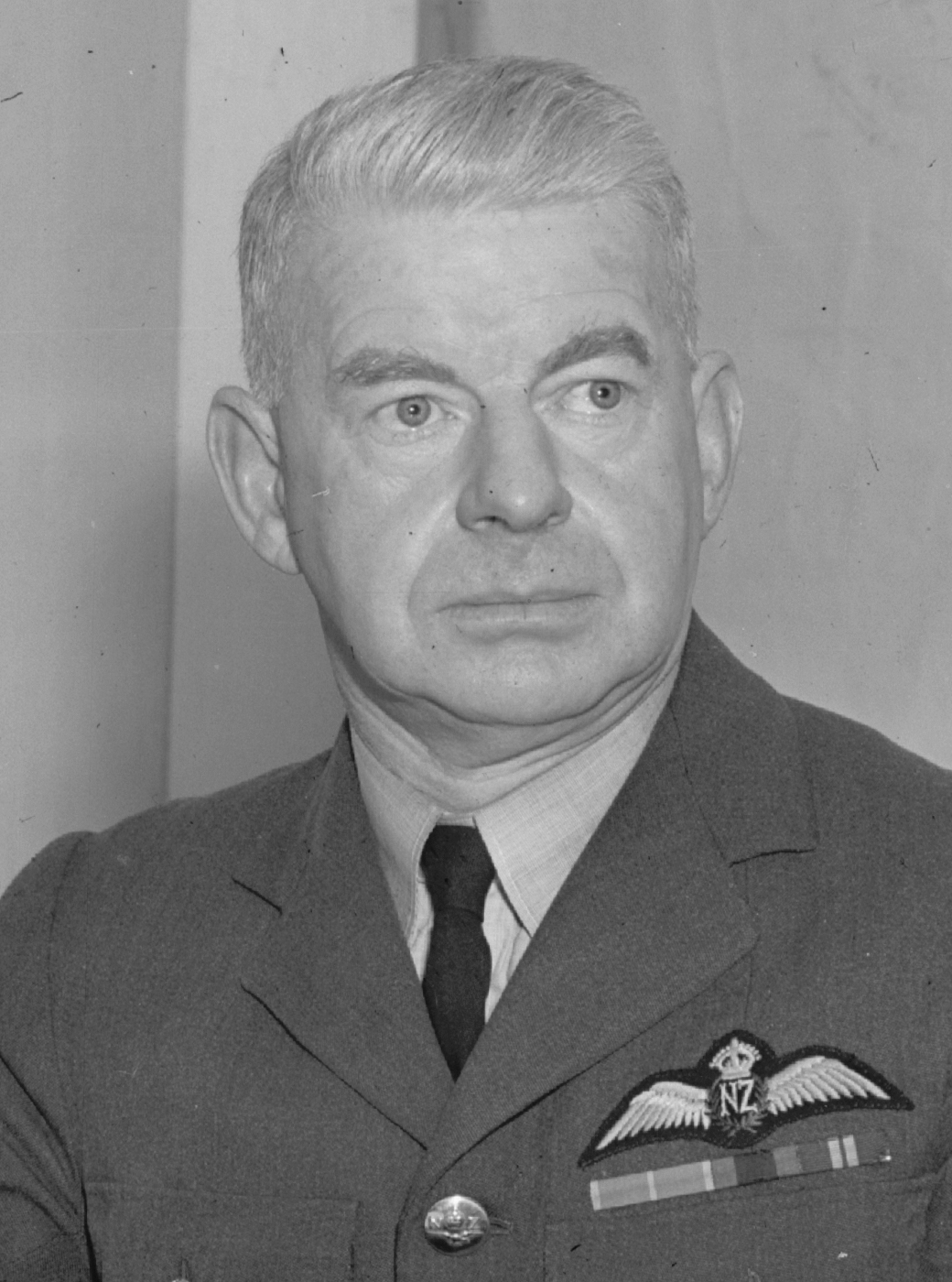
Arthur Nevill

=== Officer (OBE) ===
Military division, additional

- Lieutenant-Colonel Thomas Joseph King – New Zealand Army Ordnance Corps.
- Major (Quartermaster) William Smith – Canterbury Regiment, New Zealand Military Forces.

=== Member (MBE) ===
Military division

- Warrant Officer Class I (Staff Sergeant-Major) John Thomas Rae Bell – Permanent Staff, New Zealand Military Forces.
- Warrant Officer Class II (Company Sergeant-Major) Rodger Henry Blanshard – New Zealand Provost Corps.
- Lieutenant Robert Joseph Greening – Royal Navy.
- Warrant Officer Class I (Regimental Sergeant-Major) William Langevad – Royal New Zealand Artillery.

Military division, additional

- Pilot Officer (Acting Flight Lieutenant) James Alfred Paterson – Royal Air Force. (Note: Posthumous award. Paterson was killed in action on 27 September 1940.)

== British Empire Medal (BEM) ==
Military division, for meritorious service

- Sergeant John Ormond – New Zealand Military Farces.

== Air Force Cross (AFC) ==
- Squadron Leader Ronald Joseph Cohen – Royal New Zealand Air Force.
- Squadron Leader Samuel Charles Elworthy – Royal Air Force.
- Squadron Leader Douglas McCaul Gordon – Royal Air Force.
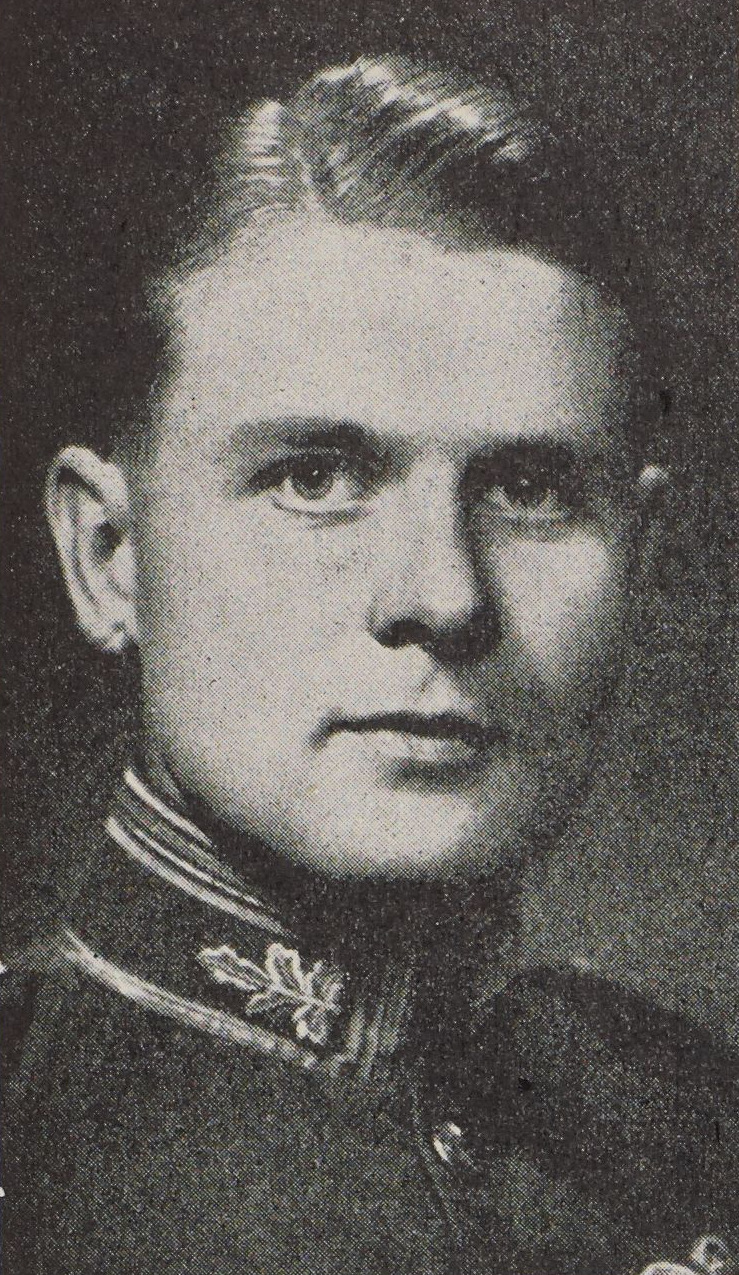
Charles Elworthy

== Air Force Medal (AFM) ==
- Leading Aircraftman Frederick Alan Partridge – Royal New Zealand Air Force.

== Mention in despatches ==
- Wing Commander Maurice William Buckley MBE – Royal New Zealand Air Force.
- Pilot Officer Charles Ewen Wilders Evison – Royal Air Force.
- Wing Commander (Acting) Andrew McKee – Royal Air Force.
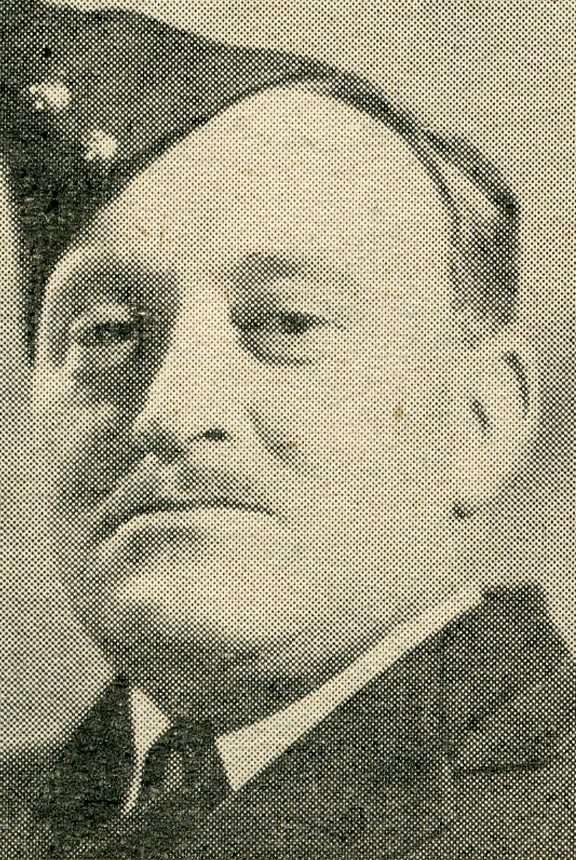
Andrew McKee

== Commendation for valuable services rendered ==
- Wing Commander (Acting) Jack Garland Skeet – Royal Air Force Volunteer Reserve.
