= James O'Sullivan =

James O'Sullivan may refer to:

- James O'Sullivan (bishop) (1834–1915), Irish Anglican bishop
- James O'Sullivan (defence storekeeper) (1855–1925), New Zealand Army Officer
- James O'Sullivan (politician) (1867–1921), member of the Queensland Legislative Assembly
- Jimmie O'Sullivan (1883–1960), New Zealand rugby union player
- James O'Sullivan (academic) (born 1986), Irish writer, publisher, and academic
