= New Zealand Army Ordnance Section =

- Active: 1915–1917
- Country: New Zealand
- Branch: New Zealand Army
- Role: Storage and assembling of artillery ammunition
- Part of: Under Command Officer Commanding Royal New Zealand Artillery
- Garrison/HQ: Fort Ballance, Wellington
- Anniversaries: 1 April

Authority was granted under New Zealand Defence Forces General Order 90 to raise the New Zealand Army Ordnance Section with effect from 1 April 1915.

The section was very small, consisting of eight members and was under command for administration of the Officer Commanding Royal New Zealand Artillery (RNZA).

Foundation members were:

- Bombardier J Murray
- Gunner C Marshall
- Gunner W Thornton
- Gunner R Ross
- Gunner P Kesham
- Gunner H J Adams
- Gunner M F Johnstone

Members of the section were classed as non-combatants, and were to be employed wholly on their own special work and were not to be detailed for any other duty or work whatsoever.

Based at Fort Ballance on Wellington's Miramar Peninsula, the section's main duties were the assembling of ammunition components for the artillery. Its members wore a variation of the badge of the RNZA with the difference between the badge worn by the Ordnance section and the Artillery was that the word "UBIQUE" was replaced by the initials "NZ".

The New Zealand Army Ordnance Corps (NZAOC) and a New Zealand Army Ordnance Department (NZAOD) were gazetted on 1 April 1917, and the Ordnance Stores Section was absorbed into the new Ordnance organisation and this small unit was the foundation of what was evolve into the Royal New Zealand Army Ordnance Corps in later years.
