= Roderick Carr =

Royal Air Force Air Marshal (1891–1971)

Sir Roderick Carr
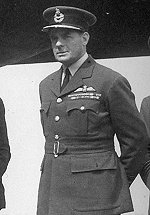
- Born: 31 August 1891; Feilding, New Zealand
- Died: 15 December 1971 (aged 80); RAF Hospital Uxbridge, England
- Military career
- Allegiance: United Kingdom
- Branch: Royal Navy (1914–1918); Lithuanian Air Force (1919–1920); Royal Air Force (1920–1947)
- Service years: 1914–1947
- Rank: Air Marshal
- Commands: Commander in Chief, Air Headquarters India (1946); No. 4 Group (1941–1945); No. 61 Group (1940); RAF Brize Norton (1939)
- Conflicts: First World War; Lithuanian War of Independence; Second World War
- Awards: Knight Commander of the Order of the British Empire; Companion of the Order of the Bath; Distinguished Flying Cross; Air Force Cross; Mentioned in Despatches; Order of St. Anna, 2nd Class with Swords and Bow (Russia); Order of St. Vladimir, 4th Class with Sword and Bow (Russia); Commander of the Legion of Honour (France); Croix de guerre (France)
- Other work: Divisional Controller, Ministry of Civil Aviation

Air Marshal Sir Charles Roderick Carr, KBE, CB, DFC, AFC (31 August 1891 – 15 December 1971) was a senior Royal Air Force commander from New Zealand. He held high command in the Second World War and served as Air Officer Commanding-in-Chief in India.

== Education and military career ==
Educated at a Feilding public school and Wellington College, New Zealand, Carr was commissioned as a temporary flight sub-lieutenant in the Royal Naval Air Service in July 1915. He saw action as a spotter at the Battle of Loos in October 1915 during the First World War.

In 1919, Carr went to Russia to fight on the anti-Bolshevist side in the civil war, where he was awarded a Distinguished Flying Cross for action against the enemy. The citation was as follows:

On the 17th June, 1919, this officer flew a scout machine over the enemy aerodrome at Puchega, at an average height of only 50 feet, for thirty minutes. During this time he succeeded in setting fire to a Nieuport enemy machine, to a hangar which contained three aeroplanes (all of which were destroyed), drove all the personnel off the aerodrome, and killed some of the mechanics.

Between 28 November 1919 and 18 February 1920, Carr served as chief of the Lithuanian Air Force (Aviacijos dalis).

In 1921, Carr was a member of Sir Ernest Shackleton's final Antarctic expedition. On his return, he was granted an RAF short service commission in the rank of flying officer.

In 1927, Carr and Flight Lieutenant L.E.M. Gillman attempted a non-stop flight to India, in a specially modified Hawker Horsley aircraft carrying much extra fuel and taking off at a weight of over 14,000 pounds (6,400 kg). Carr and Gillman took off from RAF Cranwell on 20 May 1927, but ran out of fuel en route, ditching in the Persian Gulf near Bandar Abbas, Iran. Despite this they had covered a distance of 3,420 mi (5,500 km), which was sufficient to set a new world distance record, but which was beaten in turn within a few hours by Charles Lindbergh's solo Atlantic flight between New York and Paris in the Spirit of St. Louis, covering 3,590 mi (5,780 km).

During the Second World War, Carr served in Bomber Command as Air Officer Commanding No. 4 Group RAF for the majority of the war. Carr was promoted and appointed Deputy Chief of Staff (Air) at the Supreme Headquarters of the Allied Expeditionary Force in June 1945, in the final stages of the North West Europe Campaign. Two months later, Carr became Air Marshal Commanding, HQ Base Air Forces South East Asia, and then BAFSEA was disbanded, and on 1 April 1946, Air Officer Commanding-in-Chief, Air Headquarters India.

His war services were recognised with the award of Commander of the Legion of Honour and the Croix de Guerre by the President of France. In the 1941 New Year Honours, Carr was appointed a Commander of the Order of the British Empire, and he was promoted to Knight Commander of the same order in July 1945. He was made a Companion of the Order of the Bath in the 1943 King's Birthday Honours.

In retirement, he lived in Bampton, Oxfordshire. He died at RAF Hospital Uxbridge.

Military offices
Preceded by Meredith Thomas	Commander in Chief, Air Headquarters India; 1946	Succeeded by Sir Hugh Walmsley as Commander in Chief, RAF India
Preceded by Arthur Coningham	Air Officer Commanding No. 4 Group; 1941–1945	Succeeded by John Whitley
Heraldic offices
Preceded by Sir Herbert Heath	King of Arms of the Order of the British Empire; 1947–1968	Succeeded by Sir George Gordon-Lennox
