= Units of the RNZAOC =

From 4 Store Depots in the main centers of New Zealand at the beginning of the 20th century, the Royal New Zealand Army Ordnance Corps (RNZAOC) expanded and shrank to meet the operational needs of the NZ Army. Ordinance units have been deployed worldwide and across the breath and width of New Zealand.

== Description of Ordnance Units ==
In general terms Ordnance units can be described as:

- Main/Base Depots – A battalion-sized unit, commanded by a lieutenant colonel. Usually a major stock holding unit, responsible the distribution of stock to other ordnance installations.
- Central Ordnance Depots/Supply Company – Company-sized units, commanded by a major. depending on the role of the unit, the following sub units could be included in the organisation:
  - Provision, Control & Accounts
  - Stores sub-depot/platoon
    - Traffic Centre
    - Camp Equipment
    - Technical Stores
    - Expendables
    - Clothing
    - Returned Stores & Disposals
      - Textile Repair
      - Tailors
      - Boot Repair
  - Ammunition Sub-Depot/Platoon
  - Vehicles Sub-Depot/Platoon
  - Services Sub-Depot/Platoon
    - Bath and Shower
    - Laundry
  - Rations Sub-Depot/Platoon (after 1979)
    - Fresh Rations
    - Combat Rations
    - Butchers
  - Petroleum Platoon (after 1979)
- Workshops Stores Sections – In 1962, RNZAOC Stores Sections carrying specialised spares, assemblies and workshops materials to suit the particular requirement of its parent RNZEME workshops were approved and RNZEME Technical Stores personnel employed in these were transferred to the RNZAOC.
- Workshops Prior to 1947, Equipment repair workshops were part of the Ordnance organisation, types of workshop included:
  - Main Workshop
  - Field Workshop
  - Light Aid Detachments
  - Technical Stores

== Unit naming conventions ==
Naming of Ordnance units within New Zealand was generally based upon the unit locations or function or unit.

Supply Depots were initially named based on the district they belonged to:

- Upper North Island – Northern District Ordnance Depot
- Lower North Island – Central Districts Ordnance Depot
- South Island – Southern Districts Ordnance Depot

In 1968 a regional based numbering system was adopted

- 1 for Ngāruawāhia
- 2 for linton
- 3 for Burnahm
- 4 for Waiouru

Some exceptions were:

- 1 Base Depot and 1st Base Supply Battalion, unique battalion sized unit, name was based on role not location
- 1 Composite Ordnance Company, a unique company sized unit, name was based on role not location

When the Royal New Zealand Army Service Corps(RNZASC) became the Royal New Zealand Corps of Transport (RNZCT) in 1979, the supply functions were transferred to the RNZAOC with the 1st number signifying the location with the 2nd number been 4 for all Supply Platoons:

- 14 Supply Platoon, Papakura
- 24 Supply Platoon, Linton
- 34 Supply Platoon, Burnham
- 44 Supply platoon, Waiouru
- 54 Supply Platoon, Trentham

Exceptions were:

- 21 Supply Company – Retained its name as a historical link to the units long history in the RNZASC.
- 47 Petroleum Platoon, Originally 7 Petroleum Platoon RNZASC, when Transferred to the RNZAOC, as it was based in Waiouru it added the Waiouru unit designation 4 and became 47 Petroleum Platoon RNZAOC

== Unit locations New Zealand, 1907–1996 ==
=== Alexandra ===
9 Magazines Operational from 1943. Ceased to be used by the NZ Army in 1962.

=== Ardmore ===
20 Magazines operational from 1943

=== Auckland ===
There has been an Ordnance presence in Auckland since the 1840s with the Colonial Storekeeper and Imperial forces. The Northern Districts Ordnance Depot was situated in Mount Eden in the early 1900s. In the 1940s the center for Ordnance Support for the Northern Districts moved to Ngāruawāhia, with a Sub depot remaining at Narrow Neck to provided immediate support.
RNZAOC units that have been accommodated at Auckland have been:
Stores Depot

- Albert Barracks, 1862 to 1883.
- O'Rourke Street, 1883 to 1903
- Northern District Ordnance Depot, Goal Reserve, Mount Eden 1907 to 1929
- 1 Supply Company, from 1989, Papakura
- 12 Supply Company
- 12 Field Supply Company
- 15 Combat Supplies Platoon, 1 Logistic Regiment
- 52 Supply Platoon, 5 Force Support Company

Other Ordnance Units

- Northern Districts Vehicle Depot, Sylvia Park
- Vehicle Sub Depot, Sylvia Park
- Bulk Stores Mangere, 1940s (Part of MOD Trentham)
- DSS Fort Cautley
- Northern Districts Ammunition Depot, Ardmore

Workshops

- Ordnance Workshop Devonport, 1925–1941.
- No 12 Ordnance Workshop, Devonport, 1941–1946

Workshop Stores Section

- 1 Infantry Workshop, Stores Section, Papakura 1962–1986
- 1 Field Workshop Store Section, Papakura
- 1 Transport Company Workshop, Stores Section, Fort Cautley

=== Belmont ===
Operational from 1943

- MOD Trentham, Ammunition Group, Ammunition Section

=== Burnham ===
Stores Depot
1921 saw the establishment of a single Command Ordnance Depot to service all military units in the newly organised Southern Military Command. Prior to this, Ordnance stores had operated from Christchurch and Dunedin. The new Depot (later renamed the Third Central Ordnance Depot) was established in the buildings of the former Industrial School at Burnham. Re-structuring in 1979 brought a change of name to 3 Supply Company.

- Stores Depot titles 1921–1996
  - Area Ordnance Department Burnham, 1920 to 1939
  - Southern Districts Ordnance Depot, 1939 to 1968
  - 3 Central Ordnance Deport (3 COD), 1968 to 1979
  - 3 Supply Company, 1979 to 1993
  - Burnham Supply Center, 1993 to 1994
  - 3 Field Supply Company, 1994 to 1996
- Officers Commanding

From	To	Officer Commanding
20 June 1921	19 December 1930	Captain A.R.C White
20 December 1930	30 June 1934	Lieutenant H.E Erridge
30 June 1934	2 December 1939	Lieutenant D Nicol

Other Ordnance Units

- Combat Supplies Platoon. 1979 to 19??
- Ready Reaction Force Ordnance Support Group (RRF OSG), 19?? To 1992, moved to Linton
- 32 Field Supply Company (Territorial Force Unit)

Ordnance Field Parks

- 3 Infantry Brigade Group OFP

Workshops

- No 14 Ordnance Workshop, until 1946

Workshop Stores Section

- Southern Districts Workshop, Stores Section
- 3 Field Workshop, Store Section

=== Christchurch ===
Stores Depot

- Canterbury and Nelson Military District Stores Depot, King Edwards Barracks, Christchurch, 1907 to 1921

Workshop Stores Section

- Southern Districts Workshop, Stores Section, Addington
- 3 Infantry Brigade Workshop, Stores Section, Addington
- 3 Transport Company Workshop, Stores Section, Addington

=== Dunedin ===
Stores Depot

- Otago Districts Stores Depot, 1907 to 1921

=== Fairlie ===
Nine magazines Operational 1943.

=== Featherston ===
Featherston Camp was New Zealand's largest training camp during the First World War, where around 60,000 young men trained for overseas service between 1916 – 1918. An Ordnance Detachment was maintained in Featherston until 1927 when it functions were transferred to Northern Districts Ordnance Depot, Ngāruawāhia.

=== Glentunnel ===
16 magazines Operational from 1943

=== Hopuhopu ===
Hopuhopu was established in 1927 and allowed the closure of Featherston Ordnance Depot and the Auckland Ordnance Depot and was intended to service the northern regions. During construction Hopuhopu was described by the Auckland Star as "Probably the greatest Ordnance Depot" in New Zealand Hopuhopu closed down in 1989 and its Ordnance functions moved to Papakura and Mount Wellington.
RNZAOC units that have been accommodated at Hopuhopu have been:
Stores Depot

- Area Ngaruwahia Ordnance Department 1927 to 1940
- Northern District Ordnance Depot, 1940 to 1968
- 1 Central Ordnance Depot (1 COD), 1968 to 1979
- 1 Supply Company, 1979 to 1989
- 1 Field Supply Company, 1984, from 1989, Papakura

Ordnance Field Parks

- 1 Infantry Brigade Group, Ordnance Field Park(OFP), 1968 to 1979, support to Combat Brigade Group

From	To	Officer Commanding	2nd in Command	Park Sergeant Major
1966	1969	Major Marchant		
1969	1972	Captain C.J Hodson	Captain Jim Finnerty; Captain Pat Puohataua	WO2 Rex Pennell
1972	1975	Major Ian McDonald	Captain M.D Stuart	WO2 Mike Behague
1975	1976		Captain P.E Dangerfield	WO2 Nig Taurua
1976	1978		Captain T.M.S Johnston	WO2 Barry Stuart

- 12 Ordnance Field Park

From	To	Officer Commanding	2nd in Command	Park Sergeant Major
1978		Major Ian Mcdonald	Captain Mike Johnston	WO2 Kevin Cryer

Workshop Stores Section

- 1 Infantry Brigade Group LAD, Stores Section

Other Ordnance Units

- Northern Districts Ammunition Depot, Kelms Road

=== Kelms Road ===
55 Magazines Operational from 1943

=== Linton Camp ===
RNZAOC units that have been accommodated at Linton have been;
Stores Depot

- No 2 Ordnance Depot, 1 October 1946 to 1948
- Central Districts Ordnance Depot, 1948 to 1968
- 2 Central Ordnance Deport (2 COD), 1968 to 1979
- 2 Supply Company, 1979 to 1985
- 5 Composite Supply Company, 1985 to 1990
- 21 Field Supply Company 1990 to 1996

From	To	Officer Commanding	2nd In Command	Company Sergeant Major
1992	May 1994	Major C Tarrant		
May 1994	Dec 1996	Major C Charlton		

Ordnance Field Parks

- 22 Ordnance Field Park
- 2nd Infantry Brigade Ordnance Field Park Platoon 1948-48

Workshop Stores Section

- 1 General Troops Workshop, Stores Section
- Linton Area Workshop, Stores Section
- 5 Engineer Workshop, Store Section

Other Ordnance Units

- 24 Supply Platoon
- 23 Combat Supplies Platoon
- 47 Petroleum Platoon 1984 to 1996
- Ready Reaction Force Ordnance Support Group (RRF OSG), from Burnham in 1992 absorbed into 21 Field Supply Company

=== Mangaroa ===
First used as a tented camp during the First World War and in the Second World War Mangaroa was the site of a RNZAF Stores Depot from 1943. The depot with a storage capacity of 25,000 sq ft in 8 'Adams type' Buildings was Handed over to the NZ Army by 1949. The units that have been accommodated at Mangaroa have been:
Supply Depot

- Main Ordnance Depot, 1949–1968
- 1 Base Ordnance Depot, 1968–1979
- 1st Base Supply Battalion, 1979–1985
  - ACE(Artillery and Camp Equipment) Group
  - 5 Composite Supply Company, 1977-1979

Ordnance Field Parks

- 4(NZ) Division Ordnance Field Park(OFP), 1950–1963
- 1 Infantry Brigade Group, OFP, 1963–1968,

From	To	Officer Commanding	2nd In Command	Park Sergeant Major
1963	1966	Major Colin French	Captain Mick Hunt	WO2 Ted Paterson; WO2 Ted Sweet
1966	1968	Major C.J.C Marchant	Captain Max Newman	WO2 Bob Plumber

- 1st Composite Ordnance Company (1 Comp Ord Coy), 1964–1977
  1 Comp Ord Coy was the Ordnance Bulk Holding unit for the field force units supporting the Combat Brigade Group and the Logistic Support Group and held 60–90 days war reserve stock. 1 Comp Ord Coy was made up of the following sub-units:
  - Coy HQ
  - 1 Platoon, General Stores
  - 2 Platoon, Technical Stores
  - 3 Platoon, Vehicles
  - 4 Platoon, Ammo (located at Makomako)
  - 5 Platoon, Laundry
    - Equipped with Laundry Unit M532. The Laundry unit M532 was a trailer mounted self-contained laundry unit complete with a Generator, Washer extractor and tumbler dryer.
  - 6 Platoon, Bath
    - Equipped with Bath Unit, Portable, 8-Shower head M1958. The 8-shower head portable bath unit was a liquid fuel-fired water heating plant designed to supply warm water to each of the shower nozzles. The bath unit was self-contained with all the necessary ancillary equipment such as hoses, water heater, water pump assembly and shower stands.
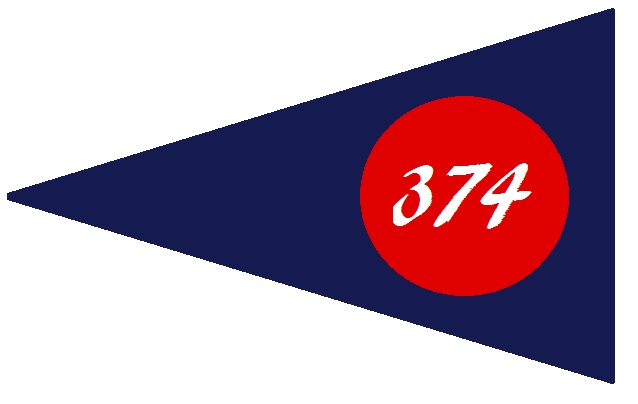
1st Composite Ordnance Company Pennant

=== Mako Mako ===
39 magazines operational from 1943

- MOD Trentham, Ammunition Group, Ammunition Section
- 2 COD Ammunition Section

=== Mount Somers ===
- 10 Magazines operational from 1943

=== Palmerston North ===
- Palmerston North Detachment, NZAOC, Awapuni Racecourse, 1914 to 1921. Depot Closed and stocks moved to Trentham.
- Ordnance Store, 327 Main Street Circa 1917–1921.
- No 2 Ordnance Sub Depot, Palmerston North showgrounds, 1942 to 1946 when depot moved to Linton.

=== Trentham ===
Stores Depot

- Main Ordnance Depot (MOD), 1920 to 1968
- Base Ordnance Depot (BOD), 1968 to 1979
- 1st Base Supply Battalion (1BSB), 1979 to 1993
- 5 Logistic Regiment (5LR), 1993 to 8 December 1996 when Transferred to the RNZALR.

Commanding Officers MOD/BOD/1BSB/5LR

From	To	Name	Corp	Unit
22 June 1940	1947	Lt Col E.L.G Brown	NZAOC	MOD
1 April 1950	12 September 1955	Capt D.F.A Roderick	RNZAOC	MOD
9 September 1955	21 July 1958	Maj O.H Burn	RNZAOC	MOD
21 July 1958	1 May 1959	Maj G.J.H Atkinson	RNZAOC	MOD
1 May 1959	9 May 1962	Maj H.P White	RNZAOC	MOD
9 May 1962	23 June 1965	Maj G.J.H Atkinson	RNZAOC	MOD
23 June 1965	20 March 1967	Maj J.B Glasson	RNZAOC	MOD
1 August 1976	25 June 1969	Maj M.J Ross	RNZAOC	MOD/BOD
23 June 1969	10 August 1970	Maj I.G Ross	RNZAOC	BOD
1 July 1970	19 August 1974	Maj W.M Campbell	RNZAOC	BOD
12 August 1974	15 September 1975	Maj R.L Cross	RNZAOC	BOD
15 September 1975	22 Niv 1976	Maj A.J Campbell	RNZAOC	BOD
22 November 1976	22 November 1978	Lt Col H.R Higgins	RAOC	BOD
6 July 1979	6 July 1981	Lt Col D.R Woolmer	RAAOC	1BSB
6 July 1981	20 November 1983	Lt Col T.D McBeth	RNZAOC	1BSB
15 November 1983	22 January 1986	Lt Col G.M Corkin	RNZAOC	1BSB
13 January 1986	31 August 1987	Lt Col K.D Hansen	RNZAOC	1BSB
31 August 1987	11 January 1988	Lt Col E.W.G Thomson	RNZAOC	1BSB
11 January 1988	6 ec 1990	Lt Col P.P Martyn	RAAOC	1BSB
17 December 1990	1993	Lt Col L.J Gardiner	RNZAOC	1BSB
1993	8 December 1996	Lt Col D.H Whatmuff	RNZAOC	1BSB/5LR

Ordnance School

- RNZAOC School, 1958 to 1994
- Supply/Quartermaster Wing and Ammunition Wing, Trade Training School 1994 to 1996

Workshops

- Main Ordnance Workshop, 1917 to 1946

Workshop Stores Section

- 1 Base Workshop, Stores Section

Ordnance Field Parks

- 4(NZ) Division Ordnance Field Park(OFP), 1950–1963

Year	Officer Commanding	Park Sergeant Major
1963	Major John Glasson	WO2 Brian Gush

Other Ordnance Units

- HQ Ammunition Group, sections at Belmont, Makomako, Kuku Valley, Waiouru
- Ammunition Proof and Experimental Centre, Kuku Valley
- Central Military District Ammunition Repair Depot, Kuku Valley

=== Waiouru ===
Ordnance Sub Depots were established at Waiouru in 1940 eventually growing into a stand-alone Supply Company.
RNZAOC units that have supported Waiouru have been;
Stores Depot

- Waiouru Sub-Depot of the Main Ordnance Depot (1940–1946) Initially managed as a Sub-Depot of the Main Ordnance Depot in Trentham, Ordnance units in Waiouru consisted of:
  - Artillery Sub Depot
  - Bulk Stores Depot
  - Ammunition Section
- Waiouru Sub-Depot of the Central Districts Ordnance Depot, (1946–1976) In 1946 Waiouru became a Sub-Depot of the Central Districts Ordnance Depot in Linton, consisting of:
  - Ammo Group
  - Vehicle Group
  - Camp Equipment Group.
- 4 Central Ordnance Deport, (1976–1979) On 1 April 1976 became a stand-alone depot in its own right.
- 4 Supply Company, (1979–1989)
  when the RNZASC was disbanded in 1979 and its supply functions transferred to the RNZAOC, 4 Supply gained the following RNZASC units:
  - HQ 21 Supply Company,(TF element)(1979–1984)
    21 Supply Company was retained as a Territorial unit for training and exercise purposes, and was capable of providing a Supply Company Headquarter capable of commanding up to five sub units.
  - 47 Petroleum Platoon (1979–1984)
  - 44 Supply Platoon
- Central Q, (1989–1993)
- 4 Field Supply Company, (1993–1994)
- Distribution Company, 4 Logistic Regiment, (1994–1996)

Workshop Stores Section

- Waiouru Workshop, Stores Section
- 4 ATG Workshop, Stores Section
- 1 Armoured Workshop, Store Section
- QAMR Workshop, Store Section

=== Wellington ===
The Board of Ordnance originally had a warehouse in Manners Street, but after the 1850 earthquake severely damaged this building, 13 acres of Mount Cook were granted to the Board of Ordnance, starting a long Ordnance association with the Wellington area.

Stores Depot

- Central Districts Ordnance Depot, Alexandra Military Depot, Mount Cook, 1907 to 1920
- New Zealand Ordnance Section, Fort Ballance, Wellington, 1915 to 1917

Workshops

- Armament Workshop, Alexandra Military Depot

== Unit locations overseas, 1914–1919 ==
Few records trace with any accuracy New Zealand Ordnance units that served overseas in the First World War. Although the NZAOC was not officially created until 1917 The New Zealand Army Ordnance Corps was constituted as part of the New Zealand Expeditionary Force (NZEF) in 1914 for overseas service only and in 1919 its members demobilised, returned to their parent units or mustered into the New Zealand Army Ordnance Department (Officers) or New Zealand Army Ordnance Corps(other Ranks)on their return to New Zealand.

=== Egypt ===
- No. 12 Rue de la, Porte Rosette, Alexandria
- New Zealand Ordnance Store, Shed 43, Alexandria Docks

=== Fiji ===
- Ordnance Detachment, Fiji Expeditionary Force, Suva. February 1920 to April 1920

=== Germany ===
- Ordnance Depot, Mulheim, Cologne

=== Samoa ===
- 1 Base Depot

=== United Kingdom ===
- New Zealand Ordnance Base Depot Farringdon Street, London
- Ordnance Depot, Coford Camp

== Unit locations overseas, 1939–1946 ==
=== Egypt ===
- New Zealand Base Ordnance Depot, Maadi, sub depots at:
  - Wadi Sarar
  - El Burg
  - Acre
- 2 NZ Divisional Ordnance Field Park
- NZ Mobile Bath
- NZ Mobile Laundry & Decontamination Unit
- NZ Salvage Unit
- NZ Base Ordnance Workshop
- 9 NZ Light Aid Detachment (att 4 Fd Regt)
- 10 NZ LAD (att 5 Fd Pk Coy)
- 11 NZ LAD (att HQ 4 NZ Inf Bde)
- 12 NZ LAD (att 27 NZ (MG) Bn)
- 13 NZ LAD (att 2 NZ Div Cav)
- 14 NZ LAD (att 2 NZ Div Sigs)
- 15 NZ LAD (att 7 NZ A Tk Regt)
- 16 NZ LAD (att HQ 5 Fd Regt)
- 17 NZ LAD (att HQ 5 NZ Inf Bde)
- 18 NZ LAD (att 6 NZ Fd Regt)
- 19 NZ LAD (att HQ 6 NZ Inf Bde)
- 2 NZ Divisional Ordnance Workshops
- 1 NZ Field Workshop
- 2 NZ Field Workshop
- 3 NZ Field Workshop
- 14 NZ Anti-Aircraft Workshop Section
- Training Depot

=== Greece ===
- Independent NZ Brigade Group Workshops x 3
- Light Aid Detachments x 11
- Brutish OFP attached to NZ Division

=== Italy ===
- No 2 New Zealand Base Ordnance Depot, Bari
- 2 Base Ordnance Depot Advance, Senegallia
- 2 NZ Division Ordnance Field Park OFP sections attached to Brigades
- NZ Mobile Laundry and Bath Unit
- Vehicle Depot, Assisi – 1945 – Jan 1946
- Stores Depot, Perugia – 1945 – Feb 1946

=== Fiji ===
- Divisional Ordnance Headquarters
- Base Ordnance Depot
- Division Ordnance Workshop
- ‘A’ Workshop Section
- ‘B Workshop Section
- 20th Light Aid Detachment
- 36th Light Aid Detachment
- 37th Light Aid Detachment

=== New Caledonia ===
- Base Ordnance Depot
- Division Ordnance Workshop

=== Solomon Islands ===
- Advanced Ordnance Depot, Guadalcanal. Officer Commanding and Chief Ordnance Officer, Captain Noel McCarthy.

=== Tonga ===
- 16 Brigade Group Ordnance Field Park
- 16 Brigade Group Workshop

== Unit locations overseas, 1945–1996 ==
=== Japan ===
- Base Ordnance Depot, Kure (RAOC unit, NZAOC personnel attached)
- 4 Forward Ordnance Depot, supporting NZ 9 Inf Brigade Group, later renamed 4 Advanced Ordnance Depot

=== Korea ===
No Standalone units but individual RNZAOC personnel served in 4 Ordnance Composite Depot (4 OCD) RAOC.

=== Malaya ===
No standalone RNZAOC units, but individual RNZAOC personnel may have served in the following British and Commonwealth Ordnance units:

- 3 Base Ordnance Depot, RAOC, Singapore
- 28 Commonwealth Brigade Ordnance Field Park, Terendak, Malaysia.

=== Singapore ===
- 5 Advanced Ordnance Depot, 1970–1971
  5 Advanced Ordnance Depot (5 AOD) was a short lived Royal Australian Army Ordnance Corps and Royal New Zealand Army Ordnance Corps combined Depot in Singapore 1970 to 1971.
- ANZUK Ordnance Depot, 1971–1974
  ANZUK Ordnance Depot was the Ordnance component, manned by service personnel from the RAOC, RAAOC and RNZAOC with locally employed civilians (LEC) performing the basic clerical, warehousing and driving tasks. it was part of the ANZUK Support Group supporting the short lived ANZUK Force in Singapore 1971 to 1974. ANZUK Ordnance Depot was formed from the Australian/NZ 5 AOD and UK 3BOD and consisted of:
  - Stores Sub Depot
  - Vehicle Sub Depot
  - Ammunition Sub Depot
  - Barrack Services Unit
  - Forward Ordnance Depot(FOD)
- New Zealand Advanced Ordnance Depot, 1974–1989
  From 1974 to 1989 the RNZAOC maintained the New Zealand Advanced Ordnance Depot (NZAOD) in Singapore as part of New Zealand Force South East Asia (NZFORSEA).
- New Zealand Workshops, RNZAOC Stores Section

=== Somalia ===
The RNZAOC (with RNZCT, RNZEME, RNZSig, RNZMC specialist attachments) contributed to the New Zealand Governments commitment to the International and United Nations Operation in Somalia(UNOSOM) efforts in Somalia with:

- Supply Detachment, Dec 1992 to June 1993
- Supply Platoon x 2 rotations, July 1993 to July 1994 (reinforced with RNZIR Infantry Section)
- RNZAOC officers to UNOSOM headquarters, 1992 to 1995

=== South Vietnam ===
During New Zealand's commitment to the war in South Vietnam (29 June 1964 – 21 December 1972). The Royal New Zealand Army Ordnance Corps did not contribute a standalone unit but provided individuals to serve in New Zealand Headquarters units, Composite Logistic units or as part of Australian Ordnance Units including:

- Headquarters Vietnam Force (HQ V Force)
- 1st Australian Task Force (1 ATF)
- 1st Australian Logistic Support Group (1 ALSG)
- 161 Battery Attachments (161 Bty Att)
- New Zealand Rifle Companies
- 161st (Independent) Reconnaissance Flight

== See also ==
- New Zealand Army Ordnance Department
- New Zealand Army Ordnance Corps
- Royal New Zealand Army Ordnance Corps
- Commonwealth Ordnance Services in Malaya and Singapore
