= William Tucker (politician) =

New Zealand politician and farmer (1843–1919)

William Henry Terry Tucker (5 January 1843 – 19 February 1919) was a New Zealand soldier, farmer, clerk, interpreter, land agent, and politician.

== Early life ==
He was born in Auckland, New Zealand in 1843. William Tucker lost his parents early in his life; his mother died when he was two and his father, Henry Tucker, died when he was seven.

== Career ==
He was mayor of Gisborne in 1887 and 1888. On 22 January 1907, he was appointed to the Legislative Council. He served one term until 21 January 1914.
