= Military Stores Department (New Zealand) =

Military Store Department (New Zealand)
- Active: 1840–1870
- Country: Britain
- Branch: British Army
- Role: Supply of equipment, small arms and all stores required for British Imperial Forces
- Garrison/HQ: Fort Britomart, Auckland, New Zealand; Mount Cook, Wellington, New Zealand

The Military Store Department (MSD) was a British army supply organisation that supplied the British Imperial Forces in the Colony of New Zealand from 1840 to 1870.

== Ordnance Board ==
In the early days of the New Zealand Colony, Governor William Hobson established the position of the Colonial Storekeeper (1840–1844) to service the needs of the nascent Colony. Concurrently a detachment of the 80th Regiment arrived from Sydney in April 1840 with a representative of the Board of Ordnance to cater for their Logistical needs.

As with all the Imperial military activities in the Colony of New Zealand, Command and Control was exercised from Sydney in New South Wales, including the activities of the Board of Ordnance and by 1846 offices had been established in Auckland and Wellington;

- Auckland Office of Ordnance, Princes Street in Auckland with Bombproof Magazine and Ordnance Store in the Mt Albert/Fort Britomart Complex with Mr William Plummer, Officer in charge.
- Wellington Office of Ordnance, Magazine at Mount Cook and Stone Warehouse on Lambton Quay, Mr Joseph Osbertus Hamley as Acting Ordnance Storekeeper.

On 25 December 1852 the following promotions and appointments were announced for the Ordnance Department for the Colony of New Zealand;

- William Plummer, Esq, to be Deputy Ordnance Storekeeper and Barrack-Master at Auckland
- Joseph Osbertus Hamley, Esq, to be Deputy Ordnance Storekeeper and Barrack-Master at Wellington

== Military Store Department ==
The Ordnance Boards performance in the Crimean War brought about the Board's demise in 1855 and the reformation of the British Army's administration, including the establishment of the Military Store Department in 1855. given the distance and long communication times between Britain and the Australasian Colonies the change over from the Board of Ordnance to the new MSD would have taken some time, but by 1857 the reorganisation had been completed and the New Zealand Colonies Ordnance offices had transitioned into the new organisation.

On 4 March 1859, Plummer died at the age of 39 years, and was buried at the Symonds Street Cemetery in Auckland. Hamley moved from Wellington and took up Plummers position and assumed charge of all the MSD operations in New Zealand.

From a strength of a few hundred men in the early 1840s, the Imperial Governments troop contribution over the next decade, had grown by the end of 1865 to a force of 10,000, including ten Infantry Regiments, two batteries of Field Artillery, Royal Engineers and Military Train, with garrisons at Auckland, Wellington, Napier, Wanganui, and New Plymouth. With the growth of this Military Force both the Ordnance and its successor the MSD, with the Commissariat had kept pace and kept the force supplied and elicited the highest tributes and praise from General Sir Duncan Alexander Cameron GCB.

== Imperial Twilight ==
By 1866 the security situation had improved to a point where operations were more often being conducted by colonial forces resulting in a draw down of Imperial units. In 1866 five Imperial Regiments departed, four more in 1867 with the final Regiment departing in February 1869.

With the withdrawal of Imperial Forces completed by July 1870, and the full responsibility for defence matters handed over to the New Zealand Armed Constabulary. Defence store-keeping responsibility was handed over to the Colony's newly created Defence Stores Department. Much equipment was handed over or sold to the New Zealand Forces, the surplus was either disposed of by other means or redistributed around the empire.

After 32 years of Colonial service Hamley returned to England.
