= New Zealand Defence Stores Department =

Department of the New Zealand Defence Department

Defence Stores Department
- Active: 1862–1917
- Country: New Zealand
- Branch: New Zealand Army
- Role: Supply of equipment, small arms and all stores required for the Defence Force
- Garrison/HQ: Alexandra Military Depot, Mount Cook, Wellington

Commanders
- Notable commanders: Lieutenant Colonel Edward Gorton (1869–1878); Captain Sam Anderson (1841–1899); Major James O'Sullivan (1899–1916); Captain T McCristell (1916–1917)

The Defence Stores Department was a department of the New Zealand Defence Department responsible for the purchase, receipt, issue and repair of stores, initially for the Armed Constabulary and then the Permanent and Volunteer Forces of New Zealand from 1862 to 1917.

== Colonial Storekeeper ==
Governor Hobson established the position of Colonial Storekeeper in 1840 to manage the purchase of good on behalf of the new colonial Government, which included the purchase and distribution of arms and accoutrements to the locally raised militias. The first Colonial Storekeeper was Henry Tucker, who by December 1842 had the following stocks for the local Militias in store:

- 46 bayonets,
- 53 Muskets,
- 2 Cannonades 18pr,
- 3 Cannons, and
- 3 Camp Ovens.

In late 1843 the Colonial Secretary of New Zealand deemed the position of Colonial Storekeeper as unnecessary and the position was to be cancelled. Stocks were either handed back to the British Ordnance Office or to the Superintendent of Public Works, and all expenditure on the Militias was placed the control of the Colonial Secretary.

Records show that between 1844–56 the position of Colonial Storekeeper was intermittently filled, and not permanently filled until 11 October 1856 when John Mitchell was appointed as the Colonial Storekeeper by the Colonial Secretary.

With the Colonial Defence Force Act 1862 authorising the formation of the first Regular Force in New Zealand, and by 1866 the Colonial Storekeepers office had a permanent staff of Eight:

- Colonial Storekeeper – Captain John Mitchell
- Clerk Auckland- John Bloomfield
- Clerk Auckland – John Price
- Clerk Wellington – Sam Anderson
- Arms Cleaner and Labourer Auckland – W.C Rockley
- Arms Cleaner and Labourer Auckland – C Phillips
- Arms Cleaner and Labourer – J Peuligan

Captain Mitchel resigned his position on 5 July 1869 and was replaced by Major William St Clair Tisdall, who assumed the position as acting colonial Store Keeper.

== Armed Constabulary ==
The Colonial Defence Force ceased to exist on the passing of the Armed Constabulary Act of 1867, Continuity was preserved because many members of the one transferred to the other and there was little change in the responsibilities of the Stores Department apart from a change in names. The new force, under a Commandant (equivalent to a Lieutenant-Colonel in the Militia), combined military with police functions but were still separated from the Volunteer forces who were still supported by the Stores Department.

== Military Store Department ==
To support Imperial Troops and attached colonial units whilst on operations in the early years of the New Zealand Colony, Military Stores Depots were established by the British Army, Military Stores Department during 1856 at:

- Fort Britomart, Auckland
- Mount Cook, Wellington

In 1866 Military Establishments were moved from Auckland to Wellington, this included the Military Store Departments Depot at Fort Britomart.

With the withdrawal of Imperial Forces completed by July 1870, full responsibility for defence matters where handed over to the New Zealand Armed Constabulary whose Stores Department assumed store-keeping responsibility for all Armed Constabulary unit and Volunteer units.

== Defence Stores Department ==
On 23 April 1869 Lieutenant Colonel Edward Gorton, took up the appointment of Inspector of Defence Stores and assuming control of the Colonial Storekeepers office's in Wellington and Auckland, effectively becoming the head of the Defence Stores.

On the retirement of Colonel Gorton in 1878, Captain Sam Anderson, a Chief Clerk with the Defence Stores since 25 October 1868 with much experience, assumed the position of Defence Storekeeper, with Stores depots at;

- Wellington, Mt Cook Barracks
- Auckland, Albert Barracks until March 1883 when store was moved to O'Rorke Street, Storekeeper Mr James Bloomfield
- Dunedin – Storekeeper Mr Peter Paxton

In 1886 with the passing of the Defence Act (1886) and division of the New Zealand Constabulary Force into separate military and police forces, the Defence Stores Department became the stores agency for New Zealand's Defence Forces under control of the Department of the Under Secretary of Defence, essentially a civilian organisation of the Defence Department.

In 1888, due to financial constraints, the Auckland and Dunedin depots were abolished and their staff made redundant. Stocks necessary for the use of the volunteer units was placed under the charge of the local magazine keepers. This left Mount Cook as the Main Stores Deport for New Zealand. By December 1888 the need for a Defence Storekeeper in Auckland was recognised and Major John William Gascoyne of the New Zealand Permanent Militia was appointed Defence Storekeeper for Auckland. By 1894 the Staff of the Defence Stores Department at the Mount Cook Depot had grown, it was announced on 1 March 1894 that 18 staff were no longer required from 31 March 1894.

On 28 September 1899, then New Zealand Government approved the proposal to send a New Zealand contingent to the Transvaal as part of the Imperial contribution to the South Africa war. At this time the Defence Stores were totally unprepared to equip an expeditionary force and did not stock a single article of mounted infantry equipment or uniforms. The Defence Store Department under Captain Anderson with only a small staff, would from 6 October for up to 16 hours daily, seven days a week, make the arrangements for the manufacture or purchase over 20,000 items of the equipment needed, uniforms, underclothing, horse equipment, saddlery, etc., which was received into stock, recorded, branded and then dispatched to Karori Camp for distribution to the assembled contingent prior to its departure, as the imperative orders were "the Waiwera must sail on the 21st." The deadlines were achieved and the 1st New Zealand Contingent sailed from Wellington in the SS Waiwera on 21 October 1899.

On 7 December 1899 the Defence Storekeeper Captain Sam Anderson died. This was at a critical time as the Defence Stores Department after years of neglect was at breaking point due to the mobilisation. J O'Sullivan also employed by the Defence Stores for a number of years, succeeded Anderson as acting Defence Storekeeper. O'Sulllivan was confirmed as Defence Storekeeper on 29 November 1900.

== Path to an Ordnance Corps ==
In 1900 a Joint Defence (Secret) Committee was convened to investigate and make recommendation on the state of New Zealand Defence, as a result the committee made several recommendations in regards to the Defence Stores Department, notable were changes to the methods of ordering, receipting and issuing of military stores be made and that Stores Depots be established at the four main volunteer centres. Parliamentary Estimates for the same year provided for the erection of Stores Depots in each centre and finance allocated for;

- A store in Wellington, Defence Stores Office, Buckle Street, Mount Cook, completed 1911
- A store in Christchurch, King Edward Barracks, Christchurch completed 1905.
- A store in Dunedin, Defence Mobilisation Store, St Andrews Street, completed 1907.
- No finance was allocated for a store in Auckland because the existing Magazines constructed in 1872 at Mount Eden were seen as suitable.

=== 1907 ===
In 1907 the Defence Forces underwent a Command reorganisation with the creation of the Defence Council. This placed the Defence Store Department under the control of the Defence Council, and the creation of two distinctive positions with the responsibility for Ordnance Stores

- Director of Artillery Services (Ordnance): Responsible for Artillery armament, fixed coast defences, and supplies for ordnance.
- Director of Stores: Responsible for clothing and personal equipment, accoutrements, saddlery, harness, small-arms and small-arms ammunition, machine guns, material, transport, vehicles, camp equipment, and all stores required for the Defence Forces.

This created a division of roles and responsibilities leading to a uniformed Ordnance corps, with the Director of Artillery (Ordnance) responsible only for Artillery supplies including weapons, ammunition and maintenance tools and equipment with Director of Stores responsible for everything else.

On 27 December 1907, James O'Sullivan was confirmed as the Director of Stores, with the Rank of Honorary Captain in the New Zealand Staff Corps.

Positions for permanent storekeepers was also authorised for each of the mobilisation locations and the following appointments were made:

- Mr A.R.C White – Defence Storekeeper, Christchurch
- Mr O.P McGuigan – Defence Storekeeper, Dunedin
- Mr F.E Ford – Defence Storekeeper, Wellington
- Mr W.T Beck – Defence Storekeeper, Auckland

=== 1911 ===
The Director of Stores title was changed to Director of Equipment and Stores early in 1911, and O'Sullivan now promoted to Major, conducted three weeks of training in November for 30 Men selected from the districts on the theory on the office and duties of the Regimental Quartermaster Sergeant. There is no doubt that in just under three years this training would be put to the test as the nation mobilised on an unprecedented scale.

On 2 August 1911, O'Sullivan's deputy, Honorary Lieutenant Frederick Silver was formally transferred to the staff of the Director of Artillery Services (Ordnance) as the Artillery Stores Accountant, as the Director of Artillery(Ordnance) assumed responsibility for the ledgers previously held by the Defence Stores.

=== 1913–14 Camps ===
For the annual camps of 1913 temporary Ordnance store depots were established, and the nucleus of an Ordnance Corps formed by the training of certain men from within the Territorial Army in a knowledge of its duties. To control the receipt and issue of ordnance stores in the brigade camps, brigade ordnance officers (Territorial) were selected in each district, and a central depot was formed in each brigade camp. The selected ordnance officers were assembled at Headquarters in January 1913 for a fortnight's course of instruction in their duties, under the Director of Equipment and Stores. In conducting the ordnance depot, each Brigade ordnance officer had the assistance of two clerks and four issuers who were selected prior to the camps from the units undergoing training.

For the first time all camp equipment was issued to regiments direct from them from the Brigade Ordnance Depot as required, thus obviating any loss by direct consignment in small lots, or doubt as to quantities taken into use. On the termination of the camps, all camp equipment in use by the units assembled was returned to the depot, and the necessary arrangements as to deficiencies made without any delay. For this purpose Regimental Quartermaster-sergeants were instructed to remain on departure of their regiments under the orders of the Brigade Supply Officer till accounts for rations and equipment had been checked and adjusted. Camp equipment was then returned to the regional mobilisation stores.

The temporary Ordnance Depot concept was repeated at the 1914 divisional camps with the Regional Defence Storekeepers acting as the Ordnance Officers and with an increased ordnance staff of 6 clerks and 12 issuers.

=== 1914–1917 ===
Within weeks of World War I, New Zealand had mobilised and deployed an Expeditionary Force to capture and occupy German Samoa, whilst concurrently mobilising an Expeditionary Force for Europe, which would depart in October. Included in the first Contingent of the Expeditionary Force to Europe was Captain W Beck the Defence Storekeeper from Auckland, who deployed as the Deputy Assistant Director of Ordnance Services (DADOS) of the NZEF, and would be the first New Zealanders ashore at Gallipoli. Defence Stores Department was at the forefront of these efforts, supplying as much as possible for the mobilising forces. In addition to preparing the Expeditionary Forces, Defence Stores also had to ensure that the four existing Mobilisation Stores, (Auckland, Wellington, Christchurch and Dunedin) were provided with additional stock and an additional Mobilisation Store that was established in Palmerston North was also provisioned to enable it to carry out its role.

By 1916 storage space and manpower was at a premium and Finance was approved to extend the Defence Stores building in Buckle Street and even though required for the operation of the Defence Stores, men of enlisting age were given the opportunity to enlist.

1916 led to further reorganisation of the Defence Stores to bring their duties into line with military requirements. The Director of Stores assumed the military designation of Director of Equipment and Ordnance Stores, the District Storekeepers being designated "Assistant Directors of Equipment and Ordnance Stores." As Defence Stores were a section of the Quartermaster General Branch, a certain amount of dual roles and responsibilities existed, so much so that O'Sullivan had been made an Assistant Quartermaster in 1914. It was accepted that as experienced officers and non-commissioned officers became available the Defence Stores would be staffed by military personnel, and assume its true relation to the military Forces of New Zealand.

On 8 April 1916, Captain Thomas McCristell, the Trentham Camp Quartermaster was appointed to succeed Major O'Sullivan as Director of Equipment and Ordnance Stores. Major O'Sullivan moved on to the role of Inspector of Ordnance Stores

== Formation of Ordnance Corps ==
On reviewing the work of the Defence Stores Department since the start of the war, a vast improvement was noticeable in the methods of accounting, care and custody of arms, equipment, and stores throughout New Zealand, and in 1917 the decision was made on 1 February 1917 the Department would be replaced with a New Zealand Army Ordnance Corps(NZAOC) and a New Zealand Army Ordnance Department(NZAOD).

The NZAOD and NZAOC were gazetted as of 1 February 1917. The effect placed the Defence Stores staff and those handling military equipment and stores in the districts and training camps on a straight-out military footing, the same as in the British Army. Regulations were gazetted in June 1917 and were modelled on British lines, and ended the anomaly of having civilians in the army who are really outside it and are not subject to military discipline and control. Defence stores staff and others doing the same work in the districts have been under the control of the Public Service, wore civilian clothes and now had purely military status, and would wear uniform.

== Directors of Defence Stores ==
| Rank | Name | Start date | Finish Date | Notes |
|---|---|---|---|---|
| Lieutenant Colonel | Edward Gorton | 23 April 1869 | 1878 | Head of Defence Stores |
| Captain | Sam Anderson | 1878 | December 1899 | Post called Defence Storekeeper (Died in Office) |
| Mr (later Major) | Major James O'Sullivan | December 1899 | April 1916 | Defence Storekeeper/Director of Stores/Director of Stores and Equipment |
| Captain | Thomas James McCristell | April 1916 | 31 March 1917 | Director of Equipment and Ordnance Stores/ Head of NZAOC & NZAOD |

== See also ==
- New Zealand Army Ordnance Department
- New Zealand Army Ordnance Corps
- Royal New Zealand Army Ordnance Corps
- Units of the RNZAOC

| Preceded by Military Stores Department | Defence Stores Department; 1867–1917 | Succeeded by New Zealand Army Ordnance Department & New Zealand Army Ordnance Corps |
