= Joseph Hamley =

Former British Army officer

Major-General Joseph Hamley CB
- Born: Joseph Osbertus Hamley; 25 September 1820; Bodmin, Cornwall, England
- Died: 5 July 1911 (aged 90); Wandsworth, London, England
- Military career
- Allegiance: United Kingdom
- Branch: Board of Ordnance; British Army
- Service years: 1838–1888
- Rank: Major-General
- Unit: Ordnance Store Department
- Campaigns: New Zealand Wars; Wanganui campaign
- Awards: Companion of the Most Honourable Order of the Bath; New Zealand War Medal, Undated

Major-General Joseph Osbertus Hamley CB (25 September 1820 – 5 July 1911) was a British Army officer who administered the New Zealand station of the British Army Military Store Department during the New Zealand Wars.

Hamley was the second son of Joseph Hamley, coroner of Bodmin Cornwall and joined the Sydney, New South Wales Office of the Board of Ordnance in 1838. Taking up the position of Assistant Storekeeper of the Wellington Office of the Board of Ordnance in 1847, Hamley saw service in the Wanganui Campaign of 1847. By 1859 the Military Store Department had replaced the Board of Ordnance, with Hamley in charge of the New Zealand station. Based at Fort Britomart in Auckland, Hamley supervised supervise the Departments operations over the course of the New Zealand Wars from 1860 to 1870. Following the withdraw of Imperial Forces from New Zealand, except of the Imperial officer remaining to pay pensioners, Hamley was one of the last remaining Imperial Officers in New Zealand.

Returning to England in 1870, Hamley was appointed in charge of Gun Wharf at Chatham, followed by postings to the War Office, Dover and Aldershot. Hamley retired after fifty years of service (thirty-two overseas) with the honorary rank of Major General. Hamley died in London on 5 July 1911.
