= James O'Sullivan (defence storekeeper) =

Military storekeeper (1855–1925)

- Born: 1855; Ireland
- Died: 23 December 1925 (aged 69–70); Wellington, New Zealand
- Burial place: Karori Cemetery, Wellington, New Zealand
- Military career
- Allegiance: New Zealand
- Branch: Armed Constabulary; New Zealand Military Forces
- Rank: Major

James O'Sullivan (1855 – 23 December 1925) was a Director of Military Stores for the New Zealand Military Forces. O'Sullivan oversaw the equipping of the contingents for the South Africa and First World Wars, and was responsible for seeing the Defence Stores Department through a period of modernisation and change.

== Early life ==
A native of Ireland, O'Sullivan studied agriculture before emigrating to New Zealand in 1876. He initially spent a year prospecting for gold on the West Coast, before moving to Wellington and joining the Native Department. Soon tiring of office life, he obtained a transfer to the Armed Constabulary.

== Armed Constabulary ==
On joining the Armed Constabulary in December 1878, he was sent to Opotiki. In the following year, trouble flared in the Taranaki. O'Sullivan, with other men of the constabulary, was sent, after a month's training in Wellington, to New Plymouth. The capture of Parihaka followed. Trouble in Taupo occurred four years later, and O'Sullivan, with about 100 fellow members of the A.C. force, were dispatched from Taranaki to preserve 'law and order' there.

The 1880s saw the Russian scare, and in 1885, and men of the Armed Constabulary were sent to Wellington and Auckland to build forts and mount guns, mainly 64 pounders. This building programme was the foundation of New Zealand's coastal defensive system. In 1885, O'Sullivan became clerk to Captain Sam Anderson, officer in charge of the Defence Stores Department.

== Defence Stores Department ==
Over the next decade O'Sullivan learnt his trade and in 1899 on the death of Anderson, he assumed the position of Acting Defence Storekeeper. He was confirmed as Defence Storekeeper on 29 November 1900. O'Sullivan's duties in those strenuous times included the equipping of every contingent (all mounted men) for South Africa, attending to the volunteer camps and rifle meetings throughout the country.

The Prime Minister of New Zealand, Richard Seddon, in recognition of O'Sullivan's good work in equipping the contingents sent to the Boer War subsequently made the appointment permanent, and in January 1907, O'Sullivan was made Director of Ordnance Stores of New Zealand and given a captain's commission. In September 1911 on the recommendation of Major General Alexander Godley, O'Sullivan was promoted to major. In July 1914, O'Sullivan was appointed assistant quartermaster.

In the early years of the great war O'Sullivan was concerned with the fitting out of the initial drafts of the Expeditionary Forces to Samoa and Europe, and of the following reinforcement drafts. On 8 April 1916, Captain Thomas McCristell, the Trentham Camp Quartermaster, was appointed to succeed Major O'Sullivan as Director of Equipment and Ordnance Stores. O'Sullivan moved on to the role of Inspector of Ordnance Stores.

At his own request, on 31 January 1918 O'Sullivan retired from active duty in the Defence Department, after nearly thirty-nine years continuous service, during sixteen years of which he was in charge of the Defence Stores Department. While residing in Wellington, O'Sullivan was a member of the Hibernian Society and the Wellington Bowling Club.

== Later life ==
On retirement he took up farming in Huntly where he died on 23 December 1925. He was survived by his wife and four children. A son, Leo O'Sullivan, who was serving as a second lieutenant in the 1st Battalion of the Wellington Infantry Regiment in France, died of wounds on 24 August 1918. Another son, William, was a well known Wellington representative rugby player. He was buried in Karori Cemetery in Wellington.
