= Henry Tucker (colonial storekeeper) =

- Born: 1793; United Kingdom
- Died: 26 August 1850 (aged 57); Auckland, New Zealand
- Resting place: Symonds Street Cemetery
- Occupation: Naval Officer
- Known for: Royal Navy Purser and Paymaster (Supply Officer) and first Colonial Storekeeper of the Colony of New Zealand
- Spouse(s): Elizabeth Howell (died 1844); Emily Shell (married 1845)
- Children: 2, including William Tucker

Henry Tucker (1793 – 26 August 1850) was a Royal Navy officer and the first colonial storekeeper for the newly established Colony of New Zealand.

== Early life ==
Tucker entered Royal Navy service at the Plymouth Yard on 29 November 1802, initially as a Shipwright apprentice under the Master Measurer. Tucker completed his apprenticeship on 14 December 1811, when he then became the Clerk to the Master Measurer, remaining in this role until 1822. This was a role of some responsibility requiring above-average literacy and numeracy skills and would have provided Tucker with intimate knowledge of the behind the scenes logistic workings of the Royal Navy.

On 16 November 1817 Tucker married Elizabeth Howell (1795–1844) at South Wraxall, Wiltshire, England. It is known that their union produced a daughter Emma Mary who was born in 1829 (died 1859) and a son, William Tucker who was born on 5 January 1843. Elizabeth died on 16 December 1844, and Tucker remarried on 20 December 1845 to Emily Shell.

Tucker, with a wife to support, must have decided that a career as a purser would be a profitable and logical path of advancement. At that time pursers were warranted by the Admiralty but did not require professional qualifications. However, some kind of financial surety was required; 20 years as Clerk to a Master Measurer provided that. The duties of a purser were to oversee supply and issue of victuals, slops and other consumables. The purser was one of the five standing officers of the ship. (A standing officer was permanently assigned to a ship.) The purser's position presented many opportunities to the canny to enrich himself, often at the expense of the crew. Bligh of HMS Bounty fame, served as his own purser, with the actual work falling to his clerk. The regulations of the Royal Navy demanded that individuals aspiring to become pursers serve at least one year as a captain's clerk, which Tucker completed on HMS Calliope, and in 1825 he obtained his promotion to the rank of Purser and Paymaster.

In 1828 Tucker was the purser aboard HMS Icarus, an 18-gun brig-sloop which was then part of the Royal Navy Barbados Station in the Caribbean, undertaking anti-piracy and anti-slavery patrols.

In 1840 Tucker was the purser and paymaster on HMS Buffalo, which whilst anchored in Mercury Bay off Whitianga, loaded with kauri spars, was wrecked in a storm on 28 July 1840. Given the remoteness of New Zealand at that time, Tucker was, along with the rest of the crew of HMS Buffalo, stranded in New Zealand, with the choice to either settle or find passage on the next available ship out.

== Career in New Zealand ==
In 1840 New Zealand became a Crown Colony separate from New South Wales. William Hobson, the incoming governor, requested that Tucker remain in the colony and undertake the office of colonial storekeeper. To this Tucker consented, occupying that position from 19 December 1840 to 1844 when the position was cancelled.

In the new colony, the role of colonial storekeeper was a key position within the quickly expanding colonial administration. The storekeeper's responsibility was to support the colonial administration with its logistical needs. Imperial troops in New Zealand were the responsibility of the Board of Ordnance, with which no doubt Tucker had a close working relationship.

Records show that Tucker as colonial storekeeper was purchasing all manner of goods including tents, blankets, stationery, printing supplies, building products, animals and feed. A primary duty of the storekeeper was to store and issue arms to settlers' militia should the need arise. By December 1842 Tucker had the following in store:

- 46 bayonets,
- 53 Muskets,
- 2 Cannonades 18pr,
- 3 Cannons, and
- 3 Camp ovens.

In late 1843 the Colonial Secretary of New Zealand deemed the position of Colonial Storekeeper as unnecessary and the position was to be cancelled. This was seen as an unpopular move and was questioned by the newspapers of the day, as Tucker was a popular individual in the community, and especially in the light that as soon as he was made redundant, a Mr Leach was appointed, under a different job title to the office of Colonial Storekeeper. The duties of the Colonial Storekeeper were in time assumed by the Superintendent of Public Works. No longer Colonial Storekeeper, Tucker remained in Government service first as the Chief Clerk Audit from 17 February 1844, and on 24 July 1844 he was appointed as the Chief Clerk, Governor's private affairs.

On 8 August 1846 it was announced in the nation's newspapers that Tucker was to be released from Government service. Judging by the newspaper articles of the time, Tucker was a well-respected public servant and there was some disappointment that he was released from public service.

== Final years ==
Late in 1846 Tucker returned to England, where he was shortly afterwards appointed Paymaster and Purser of HMS Acheron, a Hermes-class wooden paddle sloop of the Royal Navy. Whilst Acheron was undertaking a coastal survey of New Zealand, ill-health compelled Tucker to relinquish his post aboard this vessel. Years of service had greatly impaired his constitution, which rapidly gave way, and for the last three or four months he suffered with much fortitude and resignation despite being in great pain, until he died on 26 August 1850 in Auckland, New Zealand.

Tucker 's funeral was conducted with military honors: the coffin, covered with the Union Jack, and surmounted with his hat and sword, carried to the grave by a party of blue jackets landed for that purpose from HMS Fly. The funeral party included his son, the Governor of the New Zealand Colony, senior military officials and a long and highly respectable train of civilians and former shipmates from HMS Buffalo. Tucker is buried at the Symonds Street Cemetery in central Auckland.

The Daily Southern Cross newspaper summarised Henry Tucker as:

The late Mr Tucker may, without the smallest approach to monument or eulogy, be affirmed to have been a worthy, upright man. Sailors are accurate judges of character, and the soubriquet – "Honest" Ben Tucker" – which, according to Captain Edward Stanley was the appellation given him by his messmates, proved the high estimation in which he was held.

== Legacy ==
As the first colonial storekeeper of New Zealand, Henry Tucker has been adopted as the godfather of the New Zealand Army's Supply Trades. The former Royal New Zealand Army Ordnance Corps named its unofficial Senior NCO, Warrant Officer and Officer social and professional development club "The Henry Tucker Club", a tradition which has carried over to the Royal New Zealand Army Logistic Regiment. Today his name adorns lecture rooms at the Supply Wing of the NZ Army Trade Training School and is also used as the name of the a combined exercise and field phase of the Supply Technician RNZALR, Intermediate and Senior Supply courses.
