= New Zealand Army Ordnance Department =

- Active: 1917–1923
- Country: New Zealand
- Branch: New Zealand Army
- Role: Supply, maintenance and repair of equipment, small arms and all stores required for the Defence Force
- Garrison/HQ: Alexandra Military Depot, Mount Cook, Wellington 1917–1920; Trentham Military Camp 1920–1923

Commanders
- Notable commanders: Major T McCristell; Lieutenant Colonel H. E. Pilkington

The New Zealand Army Ordnance Department (NZAOD) was the organisation of commissioned officers who were responsible for the supply, maintenance and repair of equipment, small arms and all stores required for the Defence Force from 1917 to 1923.

== Establishment ==
Gazetted by regulations published on 1 February 1917, the NZAOD was established as part of the permanent staff of the Defence Forces of New Zealand, replacing the New Zealand Defence Stores Department, absorbing its existing staff and also those handling military equipment and stores in the districts and training camps. Previously the Defence Stores Department had been under the control of the Public Service Commission. The establishment of the new Ordnance organisations, ended the anomaly of having civilians in the army who are really outside it, and were not subject to military discipline and control, and placed staff who had worn civilian clothes into uniform and under army discipline.

== Organisation ==
The Gazetted regulations that established the NZAOD, laid out the organisation of the department, the same Gazette also detailed the establishment of the New Zealand Army Ordnance Corps, which was a separate organisation made up of Warrant Officers, Non Commissioned Officers, soldiers and civilians.

The NZAOD was to consist of:

- Directing Staff:
  - Director of Equipment and Ordnance Stores
  - Assistant Director of Equipment and Ordnance Stores
  - Four Ordnance officers attached to district commands
  - Two Ordnance officers of the expeditionary force camps
- Executive staff:
  - Three accounting officers at/headquarters, graded as Ordnance officers, fourth class.
- Inspectorate Staff:
  - The Inspector of Ordnance Machinery, graded as Ordnance officer, third class
  - The Inspector, engineer, electric light and defence vessels stores, graded as Ordnance officer, third class.

Officers of the Department rank as follows:

  - Ordnance officer – First class; colonel, lieutenant Colonel, or Major.
  - Ordnance officer – Second class: Major or Captain.
  - Ordnance officer – Third class: Captain.
  - Ordnance officer – Fourth class: Lieutenant.

== Foundation Staff ==
Approved with effect 1 April 1917, the foundation staff of the NZAOD and the NZAOC on its formation were:

- Directing Staff
  - Honorary Major T. M'Cristell – Director of Equipment and Ordnance stores, graded Ordnance Officer, Ist class, with the rank of Major
  - Temporary Captain T. J. King – Assistant Director of Equipment and Ordnance Stores to be asst, graded Ordnance Officer, 2nd class; with the rank of Captain
  - Honorary Captain W.T Beck DS0 – Ordnance Officer Auckland, graded as Ordnance Officer, 4th class, with the rank of lieutenant, but retained the rank of Captain (temp) whilst performing the duties' of ordnance officer, 3rd class
  - Honorary Captain A.R.C White – Ordnance Officer Christchurch, graded as Ordnance Officer, 3rd class, with the rank of captain
  - Honorary Captain O.F. M'Guigan – Ordnance Officer Dunedin, graded as Ordnance Officer, 4th class, but retained the rank of Captain (temp) whilst performing the duties' of ordnance officer, 3rd class
  - Honorary Lieutenant F.E Ford – Ordnance Officer Wellington, graded as Ordnance Officer, 3rd class, with the rank, of captain
  - Honorary Lieutenant L.F M'Nair – graded as Ordnance Officer, 4th class, with the rank of lieutenant
  - Honorary Lieutenant A.W Baldwin – graded as Ordnance Officer, 4th class, with the rank of lieutenant.
- Inspectorial Staff
  - Honorary Captain and Quartermaster B.G.V Parker – Inspector of Ordnance Machinery, graded as ordnance officer, 3rd class, with the rank of captain
  - Honorary Lieutenant and Quartermaster G.J. Parrell – Inspector Engineer, Electrical light and Defence Vessels Stores, graded as ordnance officer 3rd class, with the rank of captain

== Operations ==
The NZAOD in conjunction with the NZAOC in New Zealand and the New Zealand Expeditionary Force NZAOC, would continue to support New Zealand's war effort up to the end of the war, and then play a major role in the demobilisation of New Zealand's Forces, and the return, inspection, repair and redistribution of equipment. On 14 February 1920 Lieutenant Colonel H. E. Pilkington, was appointed Staff Officer for the Ordnance Services effectively replacing McCristell as the Director of Equipment and Ordnance Stores, with the new title Director of Ordnance Stores. As the NZEF demobilised, the NZAOD absorbed many officers who had served with the NZEF NZAOC providing much operation experience which became invaluable as both the NZAOD and NZAOC consolidated their position and started to centralise themselves as an organisation in Trentham, Burnham and Auckland.

== Amalgamation ==
On 3 July 1923, the New Zealand Army Ordnance Department was amalgamated with the New Zealand Army Ordnance Corps, resulting in one Ordnance organisation for the New Zealand Army.

== See also ==
- Royal Army Ordnance Corps
- New Zealand Army Ordnance Corps
- Royal New Zealand Army Ordnance Corps
- Units of the RNZAOC

Preceded by Defence Stores Department	New Zealand Army Ordnance Department; 1917–1923	Succeeded by New Zealand Army Ordnance Corps
