= New Zealand Army Ordnance Corps =

- Active: NZAOD (NZEF) 1914–1921; NZAOD (NZ) 1917–1947
- Country: New Zealand
- Branch: New Zealand Army
- Role: Storage, Issuing, Repair and Maintenance of Ordnance stores
- Garrison/HQ: Alexandra Military Depot, Mount Cook, Wellington 1917–1920; Trentham Military Camp 1920–1947

The New Zealand Army Ordnance Corps (NZAOC) was a Corps whose function was to provide, receive, store, repair, maintain, and issue: ordnance stores, vehicles, ammunition, foodstuffs, and ammunition. Ordnance Organisations had previously existed in the Royal New Zealand Artillery and the New Zealand Defence Stores Department, who for the Territorial Army established a temporary Ordnance Deport organisation and trained staff in Ordnance functions for the 1913 and 1914 Annual camps, so that on the eve of the great war a cadre existed within the Territorial Army to establish an Ordnance Corps to support the NZEF.

Between 1914 and 1947 the New Zealand Army Ordnance Corps existed in three distinct iterations;

- NZAOC as part of the NZEF, 1914–1919
- NZAOC alongside the NZAOD, 1917–1924
- NZAOC 1924–1947

== NZEF (1914–1920) ==
The New Zealand Expeditionary Force (NZEF) was originally established with Captain W T Beck as Deputy Assistant Director of Ordnance Services(DADOS), and a small staff. On the arrival of the main body in Egypt, Temp Sergeant Levien was attached to the British Ordnance Corps Depot at the Citadel in Cairo to study the Ordnance systems in use with the Imperial forces in Egypt. As preparation for the Gallipoli campaign progressed, the New Zealand Ordnance organisation was developed and equipped the force in accordance with Instruction G1089. To support the force a depot was established at No. 12 Rue de la, Porte Rosette and a warehouse at Shed 43, Alexandra Docks in Alexandria. After the withdraw from Gallipoli, the New Zealand Division was reorganised and prepared for redeployment to France, the Alexandra depot was closed, un-serviceable stores disposed of by auction and remaining serviceable stores not required by the NZ Division handed over to the Imperial Ordnance.

In February 1916 it was formally announced in the Evening Post Newspaper that regulations had been promulgated establishing the NZAOC as a unit of the NZEF. By the end of 1916 the NZAOC had been established under the control of the Officer Commanding NZEF Ordnance Corps and the NZEF Assistant Director of Ordnance Service (ADOS) and Staff. With an establishment of 1 Officer and 31 other ranks, members were provided from within the NZEF and attached to units throughout the New Zealand Division to provide Ordnance Services.

Once in France, Ordnance soldiers got to the business of supporting the NZ Division, although not front line troops, they were still close enough to experience the occasional shelling as this article in the Poverty Bay Herald of 8 September 1916 describes:

Corporal J.J Roberts of the New Zealand Army Ordnance Corps, "Somewhere in France" writes under date June 2lst. 'Yesterday the Germans dropped a shell on a church situated: some 200 yards away, removing the steeple, the shell passed right over our store, fortunately, for had it dropped short it would have been the finish of us. The sight was a sad one to witness the church in flames. We live very well here, The bedding is good, being most comfortable, in fact what with blankets and white sheets to cover us and a picture show with a change of pictures nightly, little is wanted. It is very quiet here the fighting on the Peninsula was ten times worse than this.

By 1918 the NZAOC had grown to include a New Zealand Ordnance Corps Section, consisting of 3 Officer and 53 ORs under the control of the NZEF Administrative Headquarters in London, with the New Zealand Ordnance Base Depot at Farringdon Street, London.

Between 1914 and 1920 members of the NZAOC served in all the NZEF Theaters as part of the New Zealand and Australian Division in Egypt and Gallipoli, the New Zealand Division in France and ANZAC Mounted Division in the Middle East.

=== NZAOC Badge ===
The NZAOC of the NZEF adopted the British Army Ordnance Corps Badge, modifying it with the letters NZ above the shield.

=== NZEF ADOS ===
Rank	Name	Positions Held	From	To
Lieutenant-Colonel	H. E Pilkington, RNZA	NZEF, ADOS	May 1918	Oct 1919
Captain	H H Whyte, MC, RNZA	NZEF, ADOS	Oct 1919	Feb 1920

=== New Zealand Division DADOS ===
Rank	Name	Positions Held	From	To
Captain	William Thomas Beck NZAOC	NZEF, DADOS; New Zealand and Australian Division, DADOS	Nov 1914	Aug 1915
Lieutenant	Norman Joseph Levien NZAOC	New Zealand and Australian Division, DADOS	Aug 1915	Nov 1915
Lieutenant	Thomas Joseph King NZAOC	New Zealand and Australian Division, DADOS	Nov 1915	Dec 1915
Lieutenant-Colonel	Alfred Henry Herbert, NZAOC	New Zealand Division, DADOS; OC NZEF NZAOC	Jan 1916	May 1918
Major	Charles Ingram Gossage, NZAOC	New Zealand Division, DADOS	May 1918	Jan 1920

=== Roll of Honour ===
NZAOC personnel who died whilst on active service.

Regimental No	Rank	Name	Date	Cemetery
23/1457	Sergeant	Percy Clarence O'Hara	11 April 1917	Bailleul Communal Cemetery Extension, France
6/3459	Conductor	Clarence Adrian Seay	20 February 1919	Cologne Southern Cemetery, Germany
6/6613	Staff Sergeant Major	Charles Slattery	25 February 1919	Cologne Southern Cemetery, Germany
11/1612	Sergeant	Alexander Charles Wisnofski	6 November 1918	Ramla War Cemetery, Israel

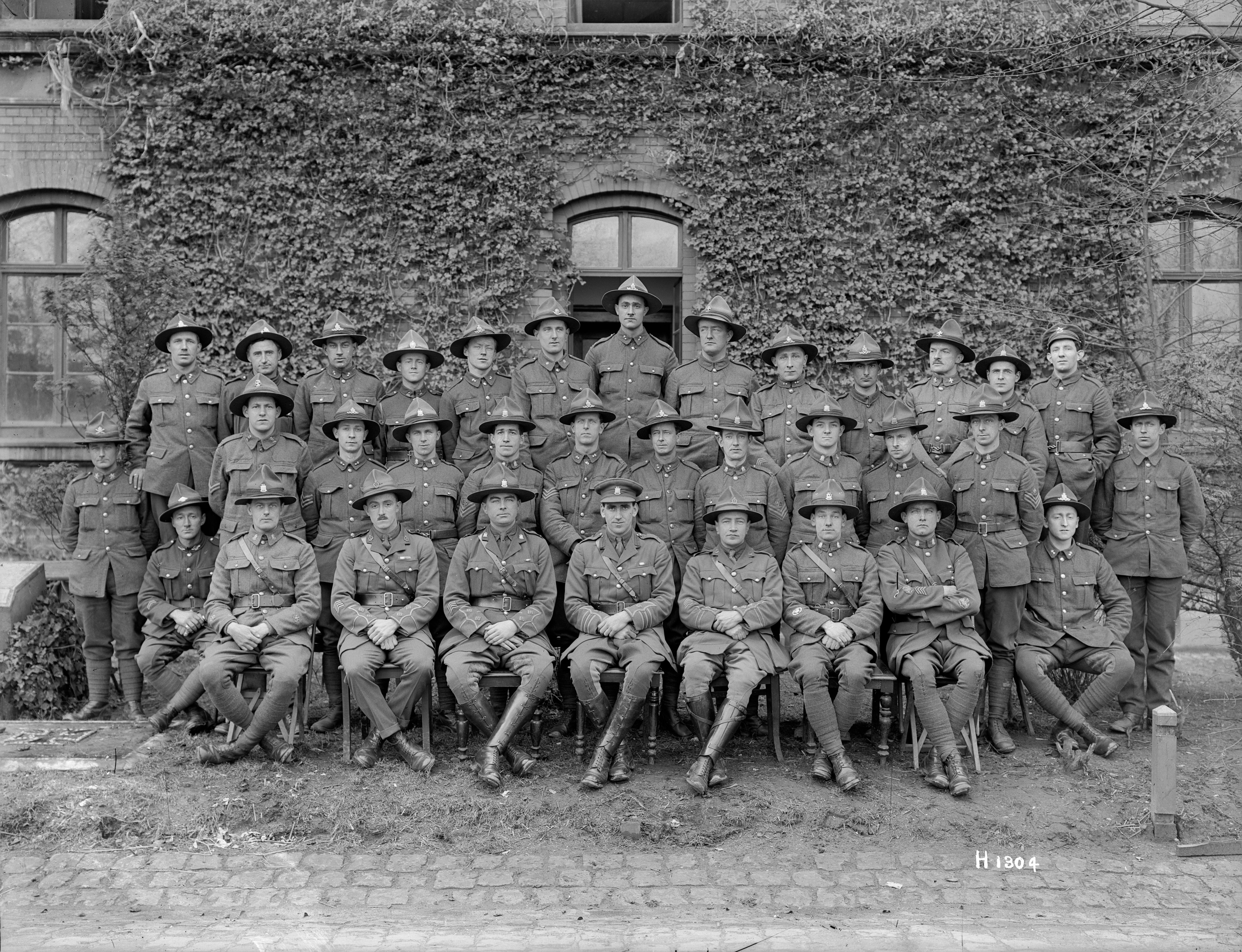
New Zealand ordnance staff at Mulheim, Germany, 1919

== NZAOC (1917–1924) ==
=== Establishment ===
Gazetted by regulations published on 1 February 1917, the NZAOC was established as part of the permanent staff of the Defence Forces of New Zealand, replacing the New Zealand Defence Stores Department, absorbing its existing staff and also those handling military equipment and stores in the districts and training camps. Previously the Defence Stores Department had been under the control of the Public Service Commission. The establishment of the new Ordnance organisations, ended the anomaly of having civilians in the army who were really outside it, and were not subject to military discipline and control, and placed staff who had worn civilian clothes into uniform and under army discipline.

=== NZAOC badge (1917–1937) ===
The NZAOC adopted the British Army Ordnance Corps Badge, modifying it with the letters NZ replacing the center cannonball in the top panel of the shield, and with the word Army Ordnance Corps on the scroll beneath the shield.

== NZAOC (1924–1947) ==
The New Zealand Gazette of 3 July 1924 published regulations that revoked the regulations that established the New Zealand Army Ordnance Department and New Zealand Army Ordnance Corps on 7 June 1917. Backdated to 27 June 1924 the New Zealand Army Ordnance Department was reconstituted into the New Zealand Army Ordnance Corps as a unit of the New Zealand Permanent Forces.

At 10:47 am on 3 February 1931 a devastating earthquake struck Napier and surrounding districts killing 256, injuring thousands and devastating the Hawke's Bay region. The 1931 reports that:

"The Defence Department was called upon at short notice to supply tents, blankets, bedding, cooking and eating utensils, for use in the stricken areas. The total value of the stores issued from the Ordnance Stores at Trentham was £35,000. The Ordnance staff did particularly good work in despatching these stores and equipment."

Despite the work carried out by the NZAOC, New Zealand was in the suffering the worst of the depression and on 31 March 1931, under the provisions of section 39 of the Finance Act, 1930 (No. 2), a number of NZAOC military and civil members were forcibly retired and all the military staff of the NZAOC (less officers and artificers) were transferred to the civil service on lesser rates of pay, from a strength of 8 officers and 112 other ranks in 1930 the NZAOC was reduced to 6 officers and 38 other ranks.

On 1 September 1946 the Mechanical Transport, Ordnance and Armourers workshops throughout New Zealand separated from the NZAOC to form the New Zealand Electrical and Mechanical Engineers(NZEME), coordinating electrical and mechanical engineering personnel into a single corps, in keeping with practice elsewhere in the British Empire.

In early 1947 a Reorganization of New Zealand Military Forces removed the distinction between Regular and non-Regular soldiers, with the result that the Territorial Force New Zealand Ordnance Corps (NZOC), ceased to be a separate Corps, becoming part of the NZAOC.

On 12 July 1947 the NZAOC was granted the right to use the "Royal" prefix and became the Royal New Zealand Army Ordnance Corps.

=== NZAOC badges (1923–1947) ===
When the NZAOC and NZAOD combined into one Corps, the NZAOC badge remained in use as the badge of the combined Corps. This badge remained in use until 1937, when it was replaced with a badge similar to the new RAOC pattern

== See also ==
- Royal Army Ordnance Corps
- New Zealand Army Ordnance Department
- Royal New Zealand Army Ordnance Corps
- Units of the RNZAOC

Preceded by Defence Stores Department & New Zealand Army Ordnance Department	New Zealand Army Ordnance Corps; 1917–1947	Succeeded by Royal New Zealand Army Ordnance Corps
