= TSS Maunganui =

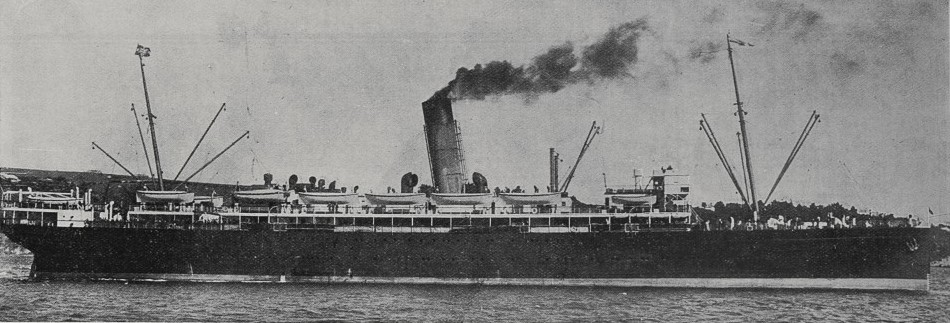
- First arrival in New Zealand waters, 1912

History
- Name: Maunganui (1911-1948); Cyrenia (1948-1957)
- Namesake: Mount Maunganui
- Owner: Union Steamship Company of New Zealand (1911-1947); G.M.Lykiardopulo (1947-1948); Cia Naviera del Atlantico (1948-1949); Hellenic Mediterranean Lines (1949-1957)
- Builder: Fairfield Shipbuilding and Engineering Company, Govan
- Yard number: 479
- Launched: 24 August 1911
- Completed: 5 December 1911
- Out of service: 6 February 1957
- Fate: Scrapped

General characteristics
- Tonnage: 7,527 gross register tonnage
- Length: 430.8 ft (131 m)
- Beam: 55.7 ft (17 m)
- Draught: 31.2 ft (10 m)
- Propulsion: Quadruple expansion engines, twin screw
- Speed: 16 knots

TSS Maunganui (later S/S Cyrenia) was a passenger vessel built by Fairfield Shipbuilding and Engineering Company, Govan for the Union Steamship Company of New Zealand and launched on 24 August 1911.

== Career ==
Launched in 1911 to carry the Royal Mail and served on the San Francisco and Sydney runs. She was employed as a troopship during World War I and World War II. After finishing her troop service in June 1919 she was refurbished and converted from coal to oil burning at Port Chalmers. She returned to her previous route from 26 June 1922. She was sold to Cia Naviera del Atlantica, Piraeus in 1948 and renamed Cyrenia. She was sold in 1949 to Hellenic Mediterranean Lines and undertook service from Genoa and Piraeus to Fremantle, Melbourne and Sydney, carrying Greek, Italian and Jewish refugees and migrants.

== Fate ==
On 1 November 1956 she left Melbourne for the last time, arriving in Savona, Italy, on 6 February 1957 for ship breaking.

== Cultural legacy ==
In Greece the S/S Cyrenia is prominent due to Nikos Kavvadias' poem "The Seven Dwarves on the S/S Cyrenia (Greek: Οι 7 νάνοι στο S/S Cyrenia) and Thanos Mikroutsikos' song mentioning the ship. Kavvadias was the ship's radio operator.
