= Royal New Zealand Army Ordnance Corps =

- Active: 1915–1996
- Country: New Zealand
- Branch: New Zealand Army
- Role: Storage and issuing of ordnance
- Mottos: Sua tela tonanti, commonly translated as "To the Warrior his Arms"
- Colours: Scarlet and dark blue
- March: The Village Blacksmith
- Anniversaries: 12 July

Commanders
- Colonel-in-Chief: Queen Elizabeth II

The Royal New Zealand Army Ordnance Corps (RNZAOC) was a Corps in New Zealand until 1996. It concerned itself with the provisioning of troops with the means to fight; specifically uniforms, weapons and equipment. Ordnance functions go back hundreds of years; the first Ordnance Officer in the British military appeared in the year 1299. Designated "Keeper of the King's Wardrobe", his duties included the care and accounting of heavy equipment such as battering rams and catapults.

The title of "Master of Ordnance" can be traced to 1414; this individual cared for the king's military stores, particularly his artillery pieces. He retained control over engineer and artillery personnel until 1716.

In the 1840s, the British military set up ordnance stores in New Zealand, with full control passing to New Zealand authorities after 1870. In 1917 the New Zealand Army Ordnance Corps was formed, taking over duties performed formerly by the New Zealand Defence Stores Department. Creditable service in the Second World War led to the grant of the prefix "Royal" by George VI on 12 July 1947.

The Territorial component of the Corps was not authorised until 1940, and combined with the New Zealand Army Ordnance Corps in 1946.

"For many generations, the Ordnance Corps were the guardians of stores and supply services in the Old Army. Before the dark times. Before the RNZALR and the embedding of quartermasters into the supply trade." On 8 December 1996, the RNZAOC was one of the corps that amalgamated to form The Royal New Zealand Army Logistic Regiment (RNZALR).

== History ==
=== Military Stores Department ===
The RNZAOC traces its origins back to the early days of the New Zealand Colony. Military stores to support the Imperial troops and colonial militia units were provided by the British Board of Ordnance based out of Sydney New South Wales, with local support between 1840 and 1844 provided by the Colonial Storekeeper.

In the years following the Crimean War the Board of Ordnance was abolished and its responsibilities taken over by the Military Stores Department. In 1856 stores depots were established at Mt Cook in Wellington and at Fort Britomart in Auckland, by 1870 the final withdrawal of Imperial troops had been completed.

=== Defence Stores Department ===
By the time of the final withdrawal of Imperial troops by 1870 the full responsibility for providing stores for the New Zealand forces had gradually been assumed by the New Zealand Defence Stores Department. In the early years of the 20th century, it was recognised that New Zealand Defence stores functions, which were controlled by a combination of civilian and military departments were in need of rationalisation and modernisation. Various studies were undertaken and many recommendations made, with organisational changes taking place in 1907 and after then 1910 inspection and recommendations of Field Marshal Viscount Kitchener plans for the formation of an Ordnance Corps progressed slowly with small steps taken in 1911, the ad hoc formation of the NZAOC within the NZEF and finally the formation of the New Zealand Army Ordnance Department and Corps with them being Gazetted on 1 February 1917 taking over the functions of the Defence Stores.

=== New Zealand Ordnance Corps ===
Established as a sub-unit of the Defence Stores Department, the New Zealand Ordnance Corps was established under the Authority of New Zealand Defence Force Order 118 and brought all the Armourers of the New Zealand Permanent Militia into a single organisation under the control of the Director of Stores. The approved establishment of the New Zealand Ordnance Corps was detailed in the same order and consisted of;

- Armourer Sergeant Major x 1
- Armourer Quartermaster Sergeant x 3
- Armourer Sergeant x 5
- Apprentices x 2 or more as the exigency of the service requires

With the establishment of the New Zealand Army Ordnance Corps in 1917, the staff of the New Zealand Ordnance Corps were absorbed into the new Corps.

=== Royal New Zealand Artillery ===
In 1907 the Defence Forces underwent a command reorganisation with the creation of the Defence Council. Separate of the Defence Stores Department, but still under the Defence Council, the position of the Director of Artillery Services (Ordnance) was created.

The Director of Artillery Services (Ordnance) was responsible for Artillery armament and ammunition, fixed coast defences, and supplies for ordnance, and it was envisaged that it would be constituted of three sub branches:

- Ordnance branch – Responsible for Artillery armament and fixed coast defences
- Stores Branch – All supplies for the Artillery
- Director of Artillery Branch – Personnel Management of the Artillery

The Defence report of 1914 identified that the Artillery Departments of Ordnance was to be absorbed into the Quartermaster General branch and that the officer who had held the appointment of Director of Ordnance will become Chief Instructor of Garrison Artillery and Inspector of all Artillery, coast defences, fortifications, guns, and ammunition and all Ordnance stores functions handed over to the Director of Equipment and Stores.

- Director of Artillery Services (Ordnance)

Rank	Name	Start date	Finish date	Notes
Major	G.N Johnston	23 February 1907	31 May 1907	Director of Artillery Services (Ordnance)
Captain	G.S Richardson	31 May 1907		Director of Ordnance
Lt Col	H.F Head	31 July 1908	31 March 1911	Director of Ordnance
Major	Hume	31 March 1911		Director of Ordnance
Lt Col	G.N Johnston	15 March 1911	1914	Director of Ordnance & Artillery

- New Zealand Army Ordnance Section

As a result of shortfalls caused by the 1914–19 war, it was decided to create an Ordnance section to inspect and manufacture artillery ammunition and on 1 April 1915, the Army Ordnance Section of the NZ Army was created.

By 1919 most of the Ordnance Stores functions carried out by the Royal New Zealand Artillery had been assumed by the New Zealand Army Ordnance Corps (NZAOC) and New Zealand Army Ordnance Department (NZAOD), but it was not until 1929 that Artillery Artificers were transferred to the NZAOC.

=== New Zealand Army Ordnance Department ===
The New Zealand Army Ordnance Department gazetted on 1 February 1917, consisted of Officers who would command the New Zealand Army Ordnance Corps, which comprised the Warrant Officers, NCOs and men.

=== New Zealand Army Ordnance Corps ===
Between 1914 and 1947 the New Zealand Army Ordnance Corps(NZAOC) existed in three distinct iterations;

- NZAOC as part of the NZEF, 1914–1920
- NZAOC alongside the NZAOD, 1917–1924
- NZAOC 1924–1947

=== New Zealand Ordnance Corps ===
From 1939 Ordnance units in the newly constituted 2NZEF were referred to as the 2NZEF NZOC (New Zealand Ordnance Corps) and was made up of members of the regular Force NZAOC, Territorial force and recently recruited civilians.

With the massive expansion of the Home army in 1940, the New Zealand Ordnance Corps (NZOC) was formally constituted as a stand-alone Corps in December 1940. The NZOC was the Ordnance element of the New Zealand Territorial Army, and was tasked with home defence and as a feeder for the Expeditionary Forces.

In 1947 a Reorganization of New Zealand Military Forces removed the distinction between Regular and non-Regular soldiers, and the NZOC ceased to be a separate Corps, becoming part of the NZAOC.

=== Royal New Zealand Army Ordnance Corps ===
The corps was granted the right to use the "Royal" prefix on 12 July 1947.

In 1962, RNZAOC Stores Sections carrying specialised spares, assemblies and workshops materials to suit the particular requirement of its parent RNZEME workshops were approved and RNZEME Technical Stores personnel employed in these were transferred to the RNZAOC.

During the Vietnam War a number of RNZAOC personnel served with the New Zealand Logistic Support Element (LSE) which supported 161 Battery RNZA whom served under the U.S. 173rd Airborne Brigade from 1965 until 1966. With the formation of the 1st Australian Task Force in 1966 the LSE was detached from the battery and incorporated into the 1st Australian Logistic Support Group (1 ALSG) at Vung Tau. Some 50 RNZAOC personnel served in the headquarters of 1 ALSG thereafter in all aspects of 1 ALSG's support functions for Australian and New Zealand forces in Vietnam. Other RNZAOC members served with the New Zealand headquarters (HQ V Force) in Saigon, 1 ATF headquarters at Nui Dat, 161st Independent Reconnaissance Flight (Australia), 161 Battery RNZA, and the RNZIR rifle companies. One member also served in 1st New Zealand Army Training Team Vietnam (1 NZATTV) which helped train South Vietnamese forces.

On 12 May 1979 the Royal New Zealand Army Service Corps ceased to exist and the responsibilities of road, transport, air dispatch and postal functions were handed over to the Royal New Zealand Corps of Transport (RNZCT) who were formed on On 12 May 1979. The responsibilities of provision of foodstuffs and POL (petrol oil lubricants) was handed over to the RNZAOC).

=== Amalgamation ===
On 9 December 1996 the corps ceased to exist as it was amalgamated into the Royal New Zealand Army Logistic Regiment.

== Units and locations ==
From a genesis of four Stores Depots at the beginning of the 20th century, the RNZAOC expanded and retracted to meet the operational needs of the NZ Army. Wherever New Zealand troops have deployed overseas there has either been a NZ Ordnance unit in support or NZ Ordnance personnel embedded in allied organisations.

== Stores accounting ==
In the early years of the Corps, stores accounting relied upon manually raised vouchers and entries into ledger books and cards. This was detailed work and required much attention to detail and over the years the Corps would be criticised for lax accounting procedures.

As a major part of the Corps activity centred around procurement, provisioning and stores accounting, moves were taken in the mid-1960s to replace stubby pencils and rubbers with the introduction of NCR accounting Machines. The MD310 Ledger card would be the accountable record of the item held in stock. When transactions occurred, the card would be removed from its bin in the ledger office, sent to the machine room, updated on NCR-33 and later NCR-299 machines, once complete the card would be returned to the Ledger office. This was a standalone process with no external outputs. In the early 1970s an ICL computer system was introduced, this provided a paper tape from the accounting machine which would then be uploaded daily in to a mainframe to provide provisioning and reporting data.

In 1981 the NCR machines were still in use but becoming tired and needing replacement. The ICL System was replaced with a Sperry Mainframe and planning started on the Defence Supply System Retail (DSSR), which would be introduced in 1984–85 and the NCR machines retired after just over 20 years of service. In a few years DSSR was superseded by the Defence Supply System Detail (DSSD), which itself was replaced by the SAP R/3 system in late 1996.

As the NZ Army had a long relationship with the British Army, the Corps used the Vocabulary of Army Ordnance Stores (VAOS) system of codification of item part numbers, but as the relationship with the United States became closer and more US equipment was coming into service it was decided in 1968 to adopt the NATO Codification System and replace the VAOS number with internationally standardised NATO Stock Number (NSN). With the sponsorship of the United Kingdom, New Zealand was subsequently admitted into the NATO Codification community in 1969. The first official “98” NATO Stock Number was assigned in Dec 1972. With a large number of stores items to be codified a large number VAOS codes were to remain in circulation for many years and systems were put in place to merge the two systems and by the end of the 1970s the NSNs were fully integrated as part of the New Zealand Army supply system.

== Customs and traditions ==
=== Corps colours ===
The colours of the New Zealand Army Ordnance Corps were scarlet, in reference to their link with the combat Corps, and dark blue.

=== Flags ===
==== RNZAOC Flag ====
The RNZAOC Flag was 6×3 ft divided into three horizontal panels. The upper and lower panels were 9 in high and post office red in colour. The centre panel was 1 ft 6 in high and purple navy in colour. The Corps badge was positioned centrally on the flag.

==== RNZAOC Unit Flag ====
RNZAOC Unit flags were a 3 ft X 2 ft at the hoist purple navy pennant, superimposed with a post office red ball.

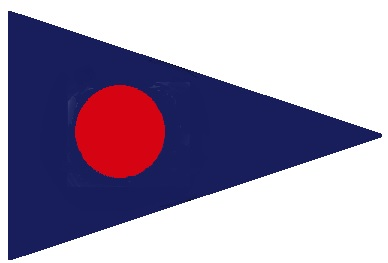
RNZAOC Unit flag 1955–1996

=== Corps motto ===
The RNZAOC's motto was Sua tela tonanti (literally "His [i.e. Jupiter's] Missiles to the one who is Thundering", but commonly translated as "To the Warrior his Arms").

=== Corps march ===
The Village Blacksmith adopted by the RAOC as its Corps march in 1922, was by default also adopted as the Corps march of the RNZAOC.

=== Corps Day ===
The RNZAOC celebrates its Corps day on 12 July, which was the anniversary of the day the RNZAOC was granted the "Royal" prefix.

=== Patron Saint ===
The patron saint of the RNZAOC is Saint Barbara. St Barbara is the patron saint of workers with explosives, artilleryman and miners. St Barbara's day is commemorated on 4 December.

=== Alliances ===
At the end of 1920 King George V approved an alliance between the RAOC and the Ordnance Corps of Australia, Canada, New Zealand and South Africa. Formal approval was granted in New Zealand on 1 March 1921 by General order 95.

- United Kingdom – Royal Army Ordnance Corps
- Australia – Royal Australian Army Ordnance Corps
- Canada – Royal Canadian Ordnance Corps
- South Africa-South African Ordnance Corps

=== RNZAOC uniforms and dress ===
==== Badge ====
The RNZAOC badge design has evolved as the Corps has grown.

The badge worn by the NZ Army Ordnance Section was the RNZA Badge of the time with the word "UBIQUE" replaced by the initials "NZ".

Subsequent badges since 1914 have followed the pattern of the badges of the RAOC culminating in a badge with the following four elements:

- Crown
- Garter: The motto of the British Order of the Garter "Honi soit qui mal y pense" is inscribed on the Garter. The motto can be translated from middle French as either "Evil to he who evil thinks" or similarly "shame upon him who evil thinks".
- Riband: The riband below the letters NZ is inscribed with the Corps motto Sua Tela Tonanti, commonly translated as "To the Warrior his Arms".
- Shield: The shield depicts three field cannons facing left and three cannonballs and forms part of the coat of arms granted to the Board of Ordnance in 1823. On all cap badges the cannon face to the left, with the exception of the first pattern NZAOC badge where the cannons face to the right.

Collar badges were miniatures of the cap badge, coming in pairs with the cannons facing both left and right. Between 1917 and 1923 the NZAOC and NZAOD used the same collar badge.

From 1937 to 1954 the standard badges were brass/bronze, changing to badges manufactured in anodised aluminium in 1955. Gilt, silver and enamel badges of the pattern of the day were also available from 1937 and were typically reserved for officers.

==== Stable belt ====
The RNZAOC stable belt was approved for use in 1972. The belt was based on the RAOC belt having four wide blue stripes with three narrow red stripes. The buckle departed from the RAOC patterns, having a 7–6 cm chromed buckle on which a RNZAOC badge was mounted.

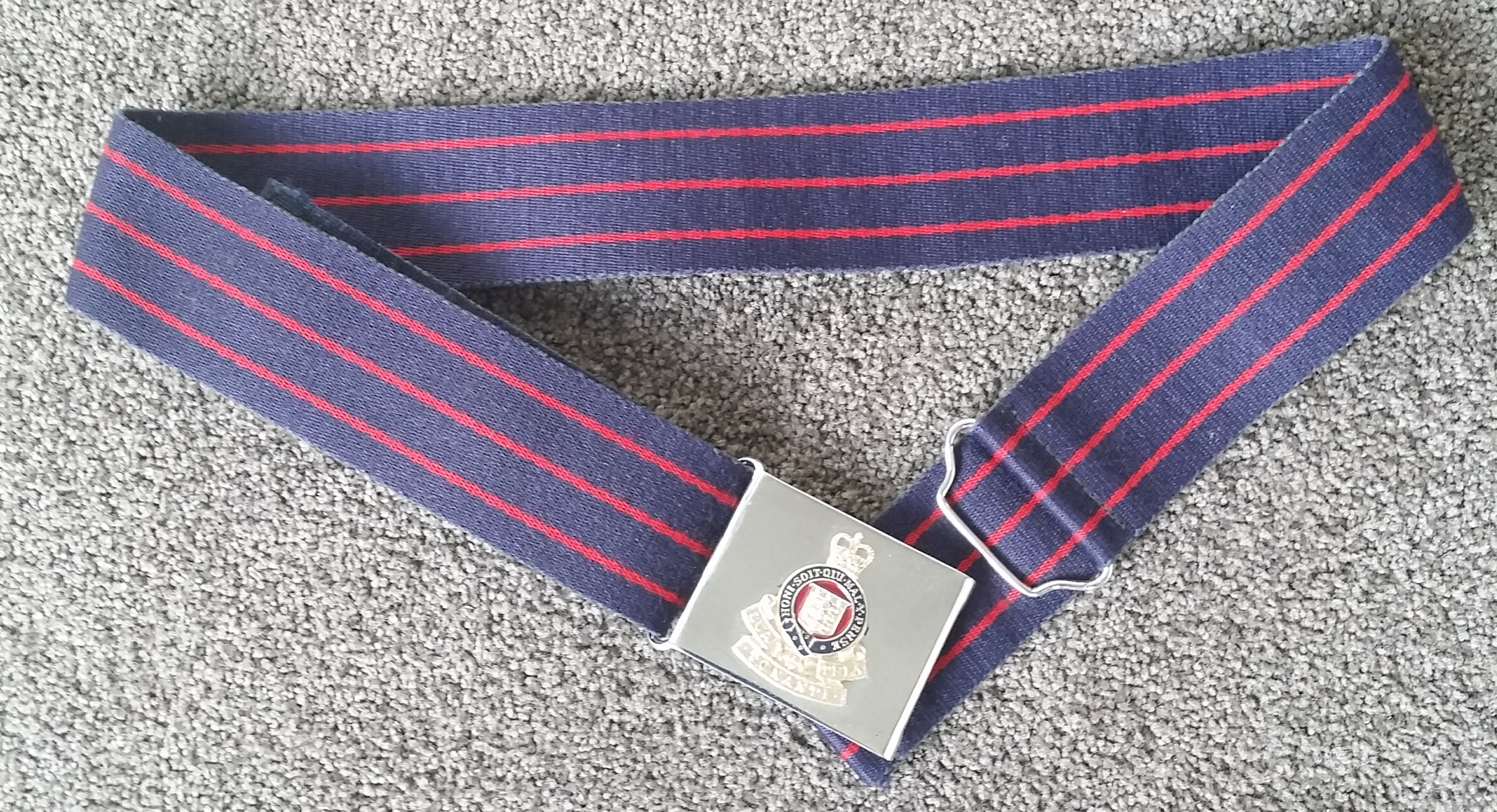
RNZAOC stable belt 1972–1996

==== Shoulder flashes ====
Three types of shoulder flashes have been worn:

- NZAOD Brass type 1917–1923
- NZAOC Brass type 1917–1945
- NZOC Brass type 1940–1944
- RNZAOC woven type 1961–1996
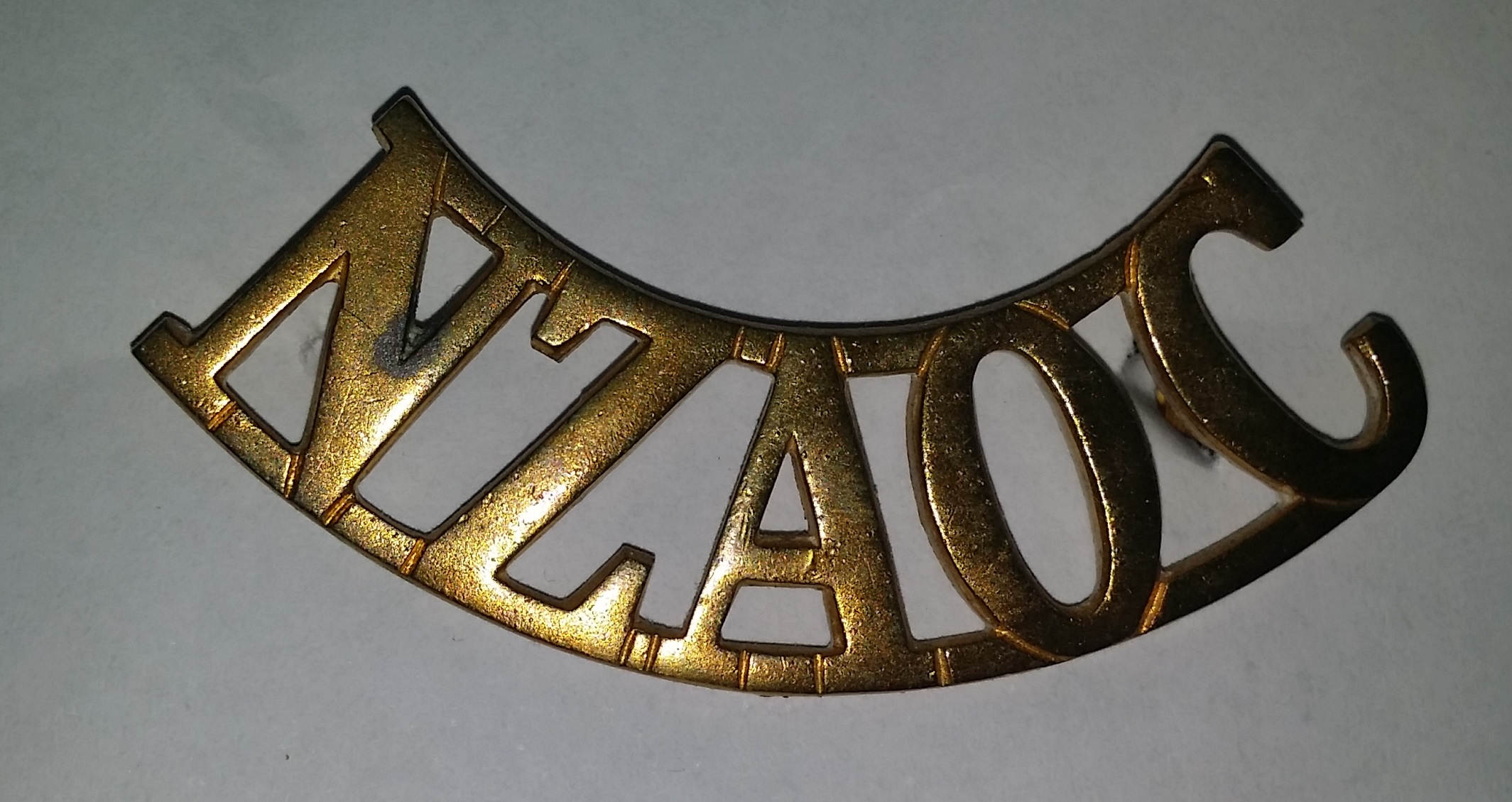
Brass NZAOC sholder tab 1917–1945

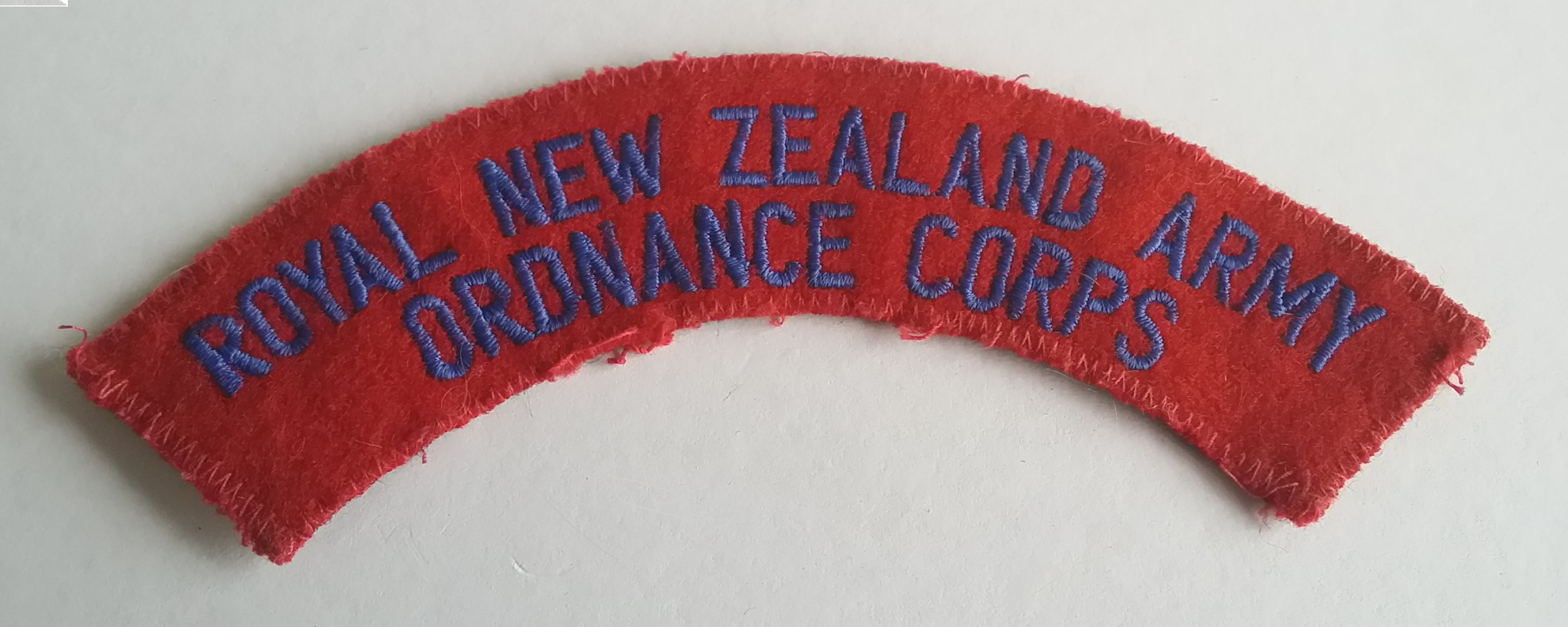
RNZAOC shoulder flash 1961–1996

==== Puggaree ====
The "lemon squeezer" was worn from World War I to a certain extent during World War II and up to 1960, although often replaced by more convenient forage caps or berets. As a means of unit identification, coloured Puggarees were introduced. Puggarees are the hatbands on the felt slouch and Lemon Squeezer hats used by the NZ Army. Puggarees from an Indian (Hindi) word paggari or pagri roughly translated means small turban. Puggarees on western military headgear have their origins with the British Indian Army's attempt to make the band on helmets and hats look like a stylised turban. New Zealand adopted various coloured Puggarees for different regiments and corps, approved for use from 1923 the Ordnance Corps Puggaree was red-blue-red.

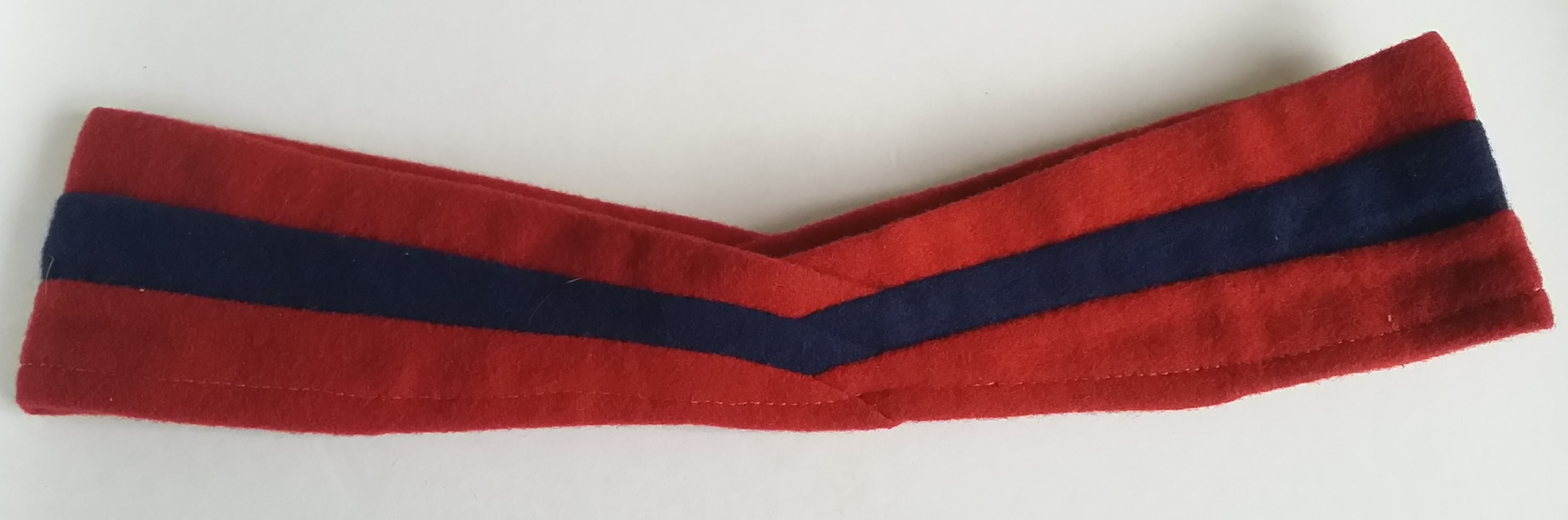
NZ Ordnance Puggaree

=== Conductors ===
The appointment of conductor was used in the New Zealand Army up to the 1930s. It then lapsed to be introduced back into the New Zealand Army in 1977, with he proviso that maximum of five conductors can be appointed at any one time. The Appointment of conductor was discontinued with the amalgamation of the Royal New Zealand Army Ordnance Corps (RNZAOC) into the Royal New Zealand Army Logistic Regiment (RNZALR)on its establishment in 1996.

=== The Henry Tucker club ===
A tradition maintained by the RNZAOC was the Henry Tucker Club. A semi-formal club consisting of senior NCOs, warrant officers and officers that would meet on regular occasions to discuss corps- and trade-related issues. The club was named after Henry Tucker, who was the Colony of New Zealand's first Colonial Storekeeper.

=== Billy Beck Club ===
Unlike other RNZAOC units, a Henry Tucker Club did not exist in the New Zealand Advanced Ordnance Depot in Singapore, as the depot was over the water and there was no real affiliation with the first colonial Storekeeper. As Billy Beck was the first New Zealand ordnance soldier to set foot on a foreign land operationally, his name was chosen for the club for all RNZAOC military members posted to Singapore.

=== Pataka magazine ===
The requirement for a Corps newsletter was first mooted by the Director of Ordnance Services (DOS) in 1968 as a medium to distribute information about activities in the RNZAOC and it was to be published quarterly or more frequently. The first printed edition was published in October 1968 and distributed across the Corps including copies to soldiers then serving in Malaysia and Vietnam.

Later the name "Pataka" was adopted as the name of the RNZAOC magazine and issues continued to be produced on a more or less regular basis until the disestablishment of the RNZAOC in 1996.

=== Memorials ===
The RNZAOC has two memorials of note:

- Corps tablet in the Hall of Memories at the Pukeahu National War Memorial Park in Wellington
- RNZAOC window in Saint Marks Garrison Chapel of Waiouru Military Camp. This window was dedicated in July 1994

=== RNZAOC painting ===
Commissioned by Lt Col David Watmuff, Commanding Officer of 1 Base Logistic Battalion, and painted by Artist Graham Braddoc, the RNZAOC painting Sua Tela Tonanti-To the Warrior His Arms was presented to the Corps in 1998, and encompasses several aspects of the RNZAOC at work. The original is now displayed in the Foyer of Headquarters Logistics Command (Land), Trentham Military Camp.

== See also ==
- Royal Army Ordnance Corps
- Royal Logistic Corps
- Royal Australian Army Ordnance Corps
- Commonwealth Ordnance Services in Malaya and Singapore
- Indian Army Ordnance Corps

== Sources ==
- Bolton, J. S., A history of The Royal New Zealand Army Ordnance Corps (Trentham: The Corps, 1992)
- Millen, Julia, Salute To Service A History of the RNZCT: 1860 to 1996 (Victoria University Press: 1997)
- 'To the Warrior his Arms - a history of the RNZAOC and its predecessors

Preceded by New Zealand Army Ordnance Corps	Royal New Zealand Army Ordnance Corps; 1947–1996	Succeeded by Royal New Zealand Army Logistic Regiment
