= New Zealand Army =

Land component of the New Zealand Defence Force

- Ngāti Tūmatauenga
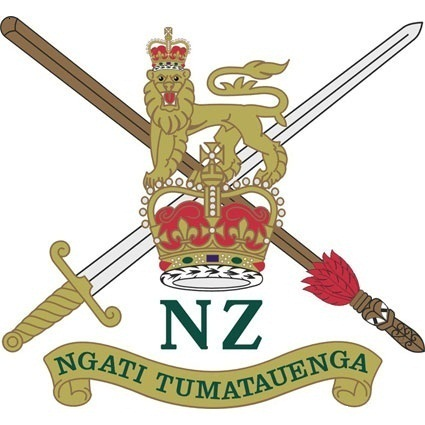
- Badge of the New Zealand Army; New Zealand Army Symbol
- Founded: 1867; 159 years ago (Note: The foundations of the professional New Zealand Army originates with the Armed Constabulary, established in 1867 to perform both military and policing roles. In 1886 the Constabulary's military arm was divided from the rest of the force, forming the basis of the New Zealand's professional land forces. The New Zealand Army name was adopted in 1950. Several New Zealand Army units perpetuate or trace their lineage back to mid-19th century Volunteer Force units.)
- Country: Colony of New Zealand (1867–1907); Dominion of New Zealand (1907–1947); New Zealand (1947–present)
- Branch: Army
- Role: Land warfare
- Size: 4,333 (Regular); 2,045 (Reserve)
- Part of: New Zealand Defence Force
- Garrison/HQ: Defence House, Wellington
- Colours: Red and black
- Anniversaries: Anzac Day, 25 April
- Equipment: List of equipment of the New Zealand Army
- Engagements: Flagstaff War; First Taranaki War; Second Taranaki War; Invasion of the Waikato; East Cape War; Tītokowaru's War; Te Kooti's War; Second Boer War; First World War; Second World War; Malayan Emergency; Korean War; Borneo Confrontation; Vietnam War; Operation Midford; East Timorese crisis; Solomon Islands; War in Afghanistan; Operation Astute; Operation Tīeke
- Website: nzdf.mil.nz/army/

Commanders
- Commander-in-Chief: Governor-General Dame Alcyion Cynthia Kiro, as representative of Charles III as King of New Zealand
- Chief of Defence Force: Acting Vice Admiral Mat Williams
- Chief of Army: Major General Rose King

Insignia
- Wartime flag

The New Zealand Army (Māori: Ngāti Tūmatauenga, 'Tribe of the God of War') is the principal land warfare force of New Zealand, a component of the New Zealand Defence Force alongside the Royal New Zealand Navy and the Royal New Zealand Air Force.

The Army traces its military tradition to militias first established in the 1840s, but its modern origins lie in the Armed Constabulary, created in 1867 to carry out both military and policing duties. In 1886, the Constabulary was divided, with its military branch forming the foundation of the professional permanent army. Its military reserve force, the Territorial Force was formed in 1910, replacing the older Volunteer Force. New Zealand's military land forces formally adopted the name New Zealand Army in 1950.

During its history, the New Zealand Army has fought in a number of major wars, including the Second Boer War, the First and Second World Wars, Korean War, the Malayan Emergency, Indonesia–Malaysia confrontation, Vietnam War, and more recently in Iraq and Afghanistan.

Since the 1970s, deployments have tended to be assistance to multilateral peacekeeping efforts. Considering the small size of the force, operational commitments have remained high since the start of the East Timor deployment in 1999. New Zealand personnel also served in several UN and other peacekeeping missions including the Regional Assistance Mission to Solomon Islands, the Sinai, South Sudan and Sudan.

== History ==
=== Colonial conflicts ===
War had been an integral part of the life and culture of the Māori, even prior to European contact. The Musket Wars continued this trend and dominated the first years of European trade and settlement. Conflicts between Māori and the British began in 1843 and peaked with the Invasion of the Waikato in the mid-1860s. After Imperial troops withdrew, settlers continued the campaign. During these New Zealand Wars, colonial forces played a central role.

The Army traces its military traditions to the earliest militias formed in New Zealand, with local volunteer forces being established in the early 1840s. These volunteer militias were disbanded with the Militia Ordinance of 1845, replaced with compulsory militias units. Compulsory militia units were active until 1872, when the Taranaki Militia was disbanded. No further compulsory militias were raised after that year, though provisions for them remained in law until 1950.

The first permanent military force in New Zealand was the Colonial Defence Force, raised in 1862. However, this force was replaced by the Armed Constabulary in 1867. The Armed Constabulary initially performed both military and policing roles, although its military arm was later split off in 1886, forming the Permanent Militia. The Permanent Militia was later renamed Permanent Force before it became the Royal New Zealand Artillery. Together with the Royal New Zealand Engineers and the New Zealand Staff Corps, they formed the foundation for New Zealand's professional land forces.

=== Second Boer War ===
Major Alfred William Robin led the First Contingent sent from New Zealand to South Africa to participate in the Boer War in October 1899. The New Zealand Army sent ten contingents in total (including the 4th New Zealand Contingent), of which the first six were raised and instructed by Lieutenant Colonel Joseph Henry Banks, who led the 6th Contingent into battle. These were mounted riflemen, and the first contingents had to pay to go, providing their own horses, equipment and weapons.

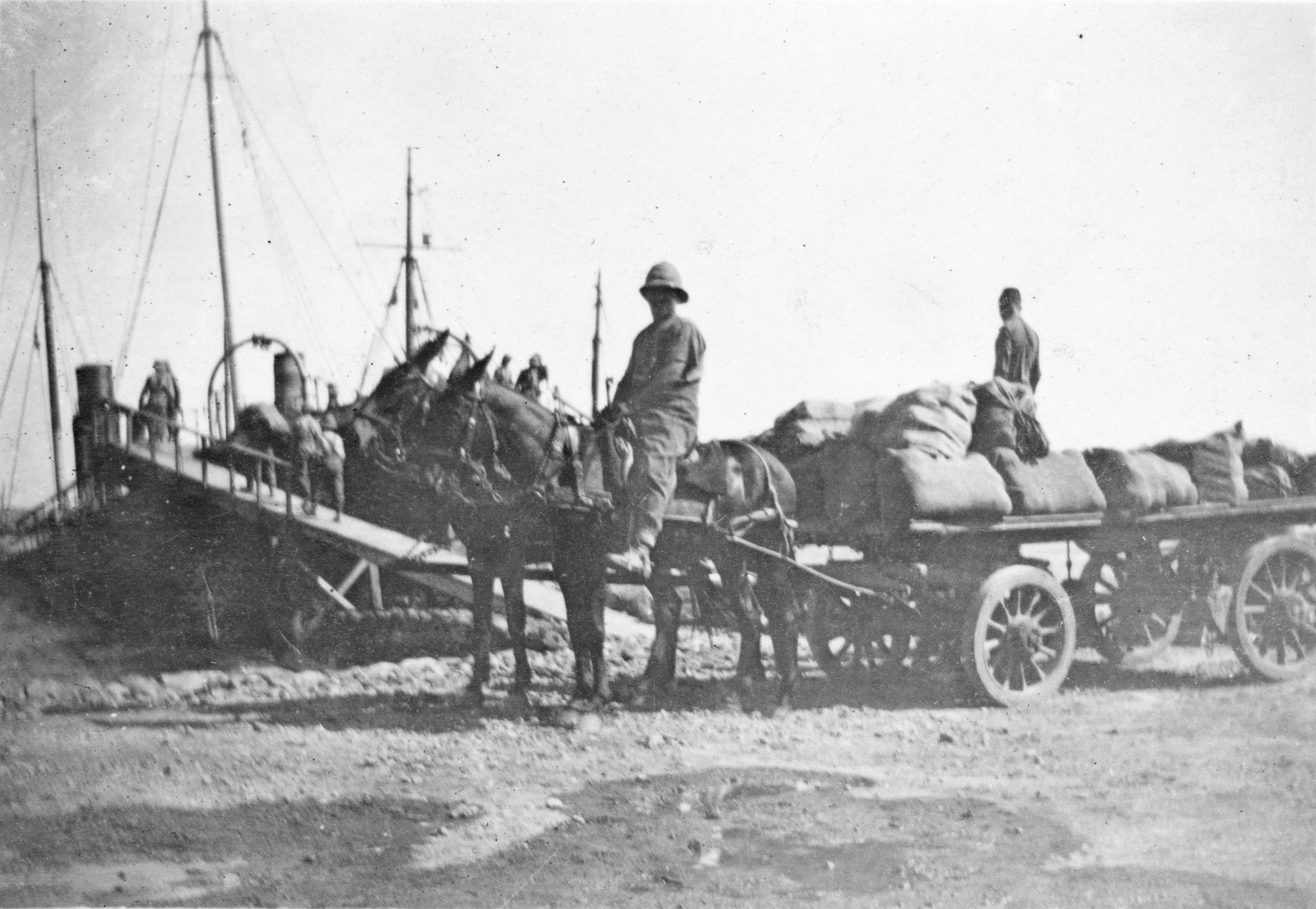
New Zealand troops landing stores, Gallipoli in WWI

The Defence Act 1909, which displaced the old volunteer system, remodelled the defences of the dominion on a territorial basis, embodying the principles of universal service between certain ages. It provided for a territorial force, or fighting strength, fully equipped for modern requirements, of thirty thousand men. These troops, with the territorial reserve, formed the first line; and the second line comprised rifle clubs and training sections. Under the terms of the Act, every male, unless physically unfit, was required to take his share of the defence of the dominion. The Act provided for the gradual military training of every male from the age of 14 to 25, after which he was required to serve in the reserve up to the age of thirty. From the age of 12 to 14, every boy at school performed a certain amount of military training, and, on leaving, was transferred to the senior cadets, with whom he remained, undergoing training, until 18 years of age, when he joined the territorials. After serving in the territorials until 25 (or less if earlier reliefs were recommended), and in the reserve until 30, a discharge was granted; but the man remained liable under the Militia Act to be called up, until he reached the age of 55. As a result of Lord Kitchener's visit to New Zealand in 1910, slight alterations were made—chiefly affecting the general and administrative staffs, and which included the establishment of the New Zealand Staff Corps—and the scheme was set in motion in January, 1911. Major-General Sir Alexander Godley, of the Imperial General Staff, was engaged as commandant.

=== First World War ===
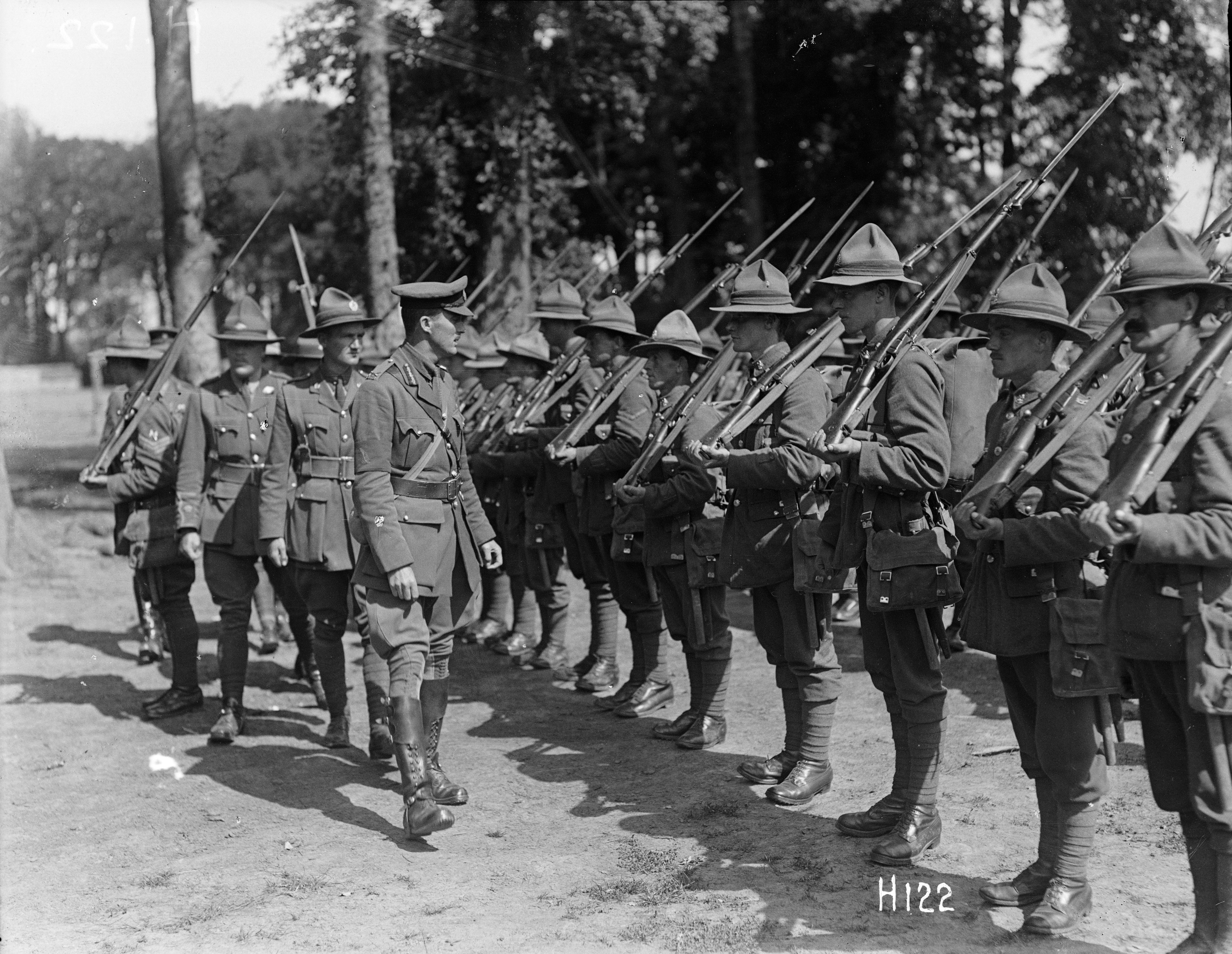
New Zealand soldiers in France during 1917

Following the outbreak of the First World War, New Zealand raised the initially all volunteer New Zealand Expeditionary Force (NZEF) for service overseas. A smaller expeditionary force, the Samoa Expeditionary Force, was tasked to occupy German Samoa, which it achieved without resistance.

The NZEF would be sent to Egypt and would participate in the Gallipoli Campaign under the Australian and New Zealand Army Corps (ANZAC). The New Zealand Division was then formed which fought on the Western Front and the New Zealand Mounted Rifles Brigade fought in Palestine. After Major General Godley departed with the NZEF in October 1914, Major General Alfred William Robin commanded New Zealand Military Forces at home throughout the war, as commandant.

The total number of New Zealand troops and nurses to serve overseas in 1914–1918, excluding those in British and other dominion forces, was 100,000, from a population of just over a million. Forty-two percent of men of military age served in the NZEF. 16,697 New Zealanders were killed and 41,317 were wounded during the war—a 58 percent casualty rate. Approximately a further thousand men died within five years of the war's end, as a result of injuries sustained, and 507 died whilst training in New Zealand between 1914 and 1918. New Zealand had one of the highest casualty—and death—rates per capita of any country involved in the war.

=== Second World War ===
During the Second World War, the 2nd New Zealand Expeditionary Force (I.E. 2nd Division) fought in Greece, Crete, the Western Desert campaign and the Italian campaign. Among its units was the famed 28th Māori Battalion. Following Japan's entry into the war, 3rd Division, 2 NZEF IP (in Pacific) saw action in the Pacific, seizing a number of islands from the Japanese. New Zealanders contributed to various Allied special forces units, such as the original Long Range Desert Group in North Africa and Z Force in the Pacific.

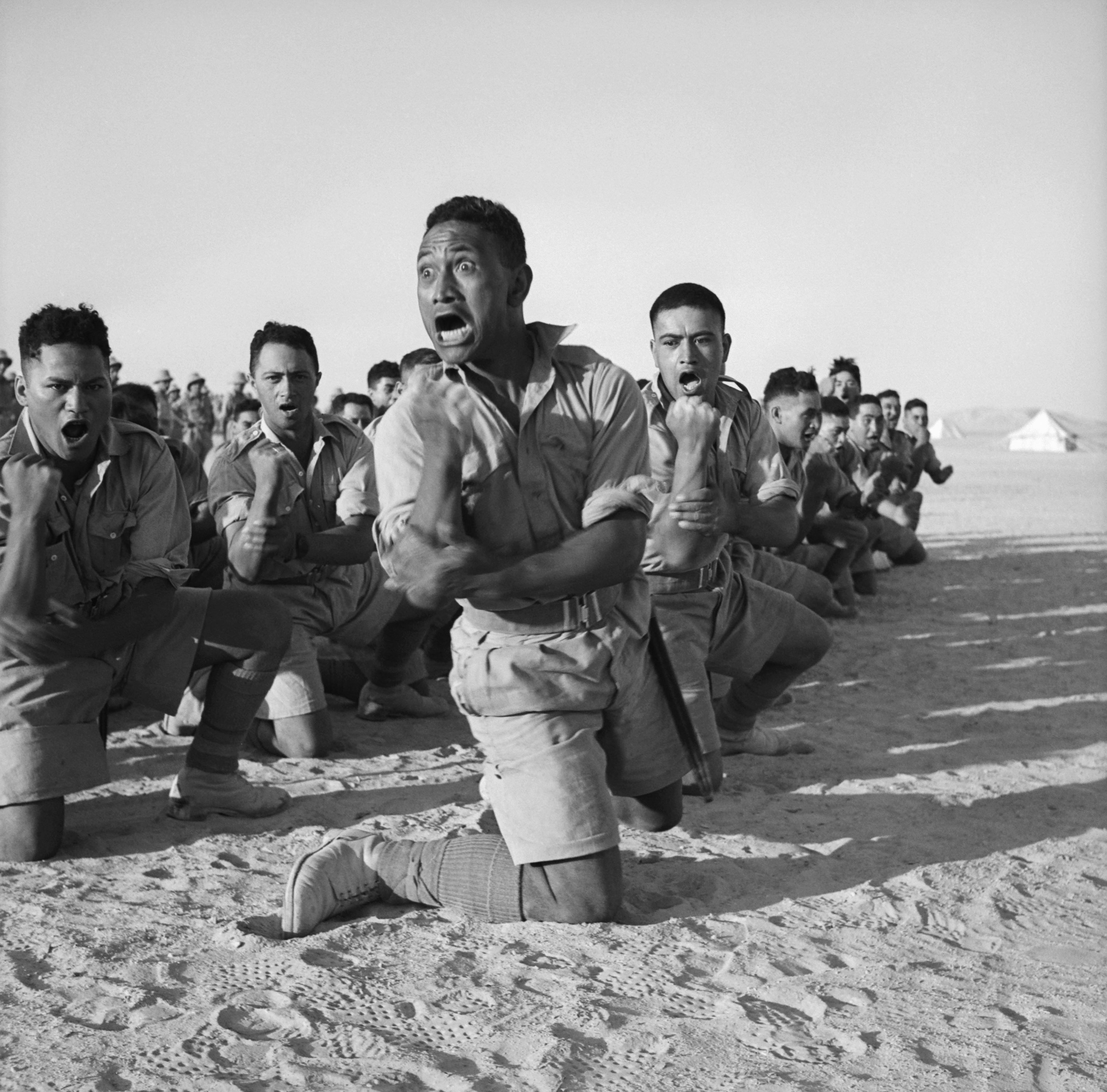
Maori troops performing a haka in North Africa during July 1941

As part of the preparations for the possible outbreak of war in the Pacific, the defensive forces stationed in New Zealand were expanded in late 1941. On 1 November, three new brigade headquarters were raised (taking the total in the New Zealand Army to seven), and three divisional headquarters were established to coordinate the units located in the Northern, Central and Southern Military Districts. The division in the Northern Military District was designated the Northern Division, and comprised the 1st and 12th Brigade Groups. Northern Division later became 1st Division. 4th Division was established in the Central Military District (with 2nd and 7th brigades), and 5th in the south (with 3rd, 10th and 11th brigades).

The forces stationed in New Zealand were considerably reduced as the threat of invasion passed. During early 1943, each of the three home defence divisions were cut from 22,358 to 11,530 men. The non-divisional units suffered even greater reductions. The New Zealand government ordered a general stand-down of the defensive forces in the country on 28 June, which led to further reductions in the strength of units and a lower state of readiness. By the end of the year, almost all of the Territorial Force personnel had been demobilised (though they retained their uniforms and equipment), and only 44 soldiers were posted to the three divisional and seven brigade headquarters. The war situation continued to improve, and the 4th Division, along with the other two divisions and almost all the remaining Territorial Force units, was disbanded on 1 April 1944.

The 6th New Zealand Division was also briefly formed as a deception formation by renaming the NZ camp at Maadi in southern Cairo, the New Zealanders' base area in Egypt, in 1942. In addition, the 1st Army Tank Brigade (New Zealand) was also active for a time.

=== Cold War ===
==== Post-War ====
Following the Second World War, attention focused on preparing a third Expeditionary Force potentially for service against the Soviets. Compulsory military training was introduced to man the force, which was initially division-sized. The New Zealand Army Act 1950 reformed the country's land forces into the New Zealand Army. The Act stipulating that the Army would consist from then on of Army Troops (army headquarters, Army Schools, and base units); District Troops (Northern Military District, Central and Southern Military Districts, the 12 subordinate area HQs, elementary training elements, coastal artillery and composite AA regiments); and the New Zealand Division, the mobile striking force. The division was alternatively known as '3NZEF'.

==== Korean War ====
The Army's first combat after the Second World War was in the Korean War, which began with North Korea's invasion of the South on 25 June 1950. After some debate, on 26 July 1950, the New Zealand government announced it would raise a volunteer military force to serve with the United Nations Command in Korea. The idea was opposed initially by Chief of the General Staff, Major-General Keith Lindsay Stewart, who did not believe the force would be large enough to be self-sufficient. His opposition was overruled and the government raised what was known as Kayforce, a total of 1,044 men selected from among volunteers. 16th Field Regiment, Royal New Zealand Artillery and support elements arrived later during the conflict from New Zealand. The force arrived at Pusan on New Year's Eve, and on 21 January, joined the British 27th Infantry Brigade representing the 1st Commonwealth Division, along with Australian, Canadian, and Indian forces. The New Zealanders immediately saw combat and spent the next two and a half years taking part in the operations which led the United Nations forces back to and over the 38th Parallel, later recapturing Seoul in the process.

The majority of Kayforce had returned to New Zealand by 1955, though it was not until 1957 that the last New Zealand soldiers had left Korea. In all, about 4700 men served with Kayforce.

In 1957, the 9th Coast Regiment, Royal New Zealand Artillery, was reduced to a cadre along with the other coastal artillery regiments (10th and 11th). Personnel were gradually run down until there was only a single supervisory District Gunner. All three were disbanded in 1967.

==== Irregular warfare ====
Through the 1950s, New Zealand Army forces were deployed to the Malayan Emergency, and the Confrontation with Indonesia. A Special Air Service squadron was raised for this commitment, but most forces came from the New Zealand infantry battalion in the Malaysia–Singapore area. The battalion was committed to the Far East Strategic Reserve.

The 1957 national government defence review directed the discontinuation of coastal defence training, and the approximately 1000 personnel of the 9th, 10th, and 11th coastal regiments Royal New Zealand Artillery had their compulsory military training obligation removed. A small cadre of regulars remained, but as Henderson, Green, and Cook say, 'the coastal artillery had quietly died.' All the fixed guns were dismantled and sold for scrap by the early 1960s. After 1945, the Valentine tanks in service were eventually replaced by about ten M41 Walker Bulldogs, supplemented by a small number of Centurion tanks. Eventually, both were superseded by FV101 Scorpion armoured reconnaissance vehicles.

==== Vietnam War ====
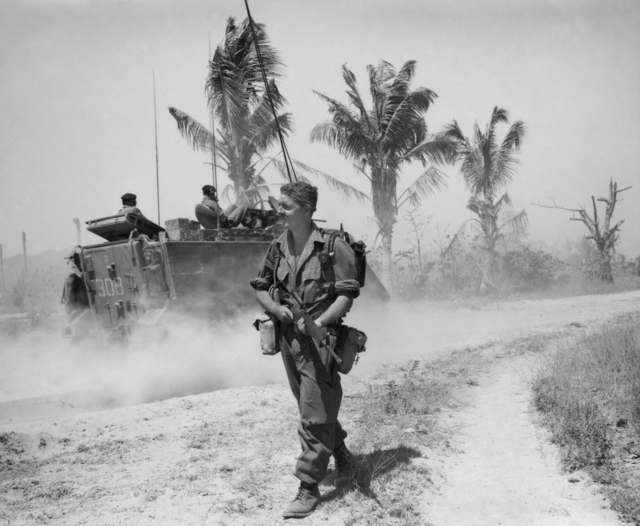
New Zealand soldier from W Company, RNZIR patrols in Vietnam, 1968

New Zealand sent troops to the Vietnam War in 1964 because of Cold War concerns and alliance considerations.

Initial contributions were a New Zealand team of non-combat army engineers in 1964 followed by a battery from the Royal New Zealand Artillery in 1965 which served initially with the Americans until the formation of the 1st Australian Task Force in 1966. Thereafter, the battery served with the task force until 1971.

Two Companies of New Zealand infantry, Whisky Company and Victor Company, served with the 1st Australian Task Force from 1967 until 1971. Some also served with the Australian and New Zealand Army Training teams until 1972.

NZ SAS arrived in 1968 and served with the Australian SAS until the Australian and New Zealand troop withdrawal in 1971.

Members from various branches of the NZ Army also served with U.S and Australian air and cavalry detachments as well as in intelligence, medical, and engineering. In all, 3850 military personnel from all military branches of service served in Vietnam. New Zealand infantry accounted for approximately 1600 and the New Zealand artillery battery accounted for approximately 750.

=== Peacekeeping operations ===
The New Zealand Division was disbanded in 1961, as succeeding governments reduced the force, first to two brigades, and then a single one. This one-brigade force became, in the 1980s, the Integrated Expansion Force, to be formed by producing three composite battalions from the six Territorial Force infantry regiments. In 1978, a national museum for the Army, the QEII Army Memorial Museum, was built at Waiouru, the Army's main training base in the central North Island.

After the 1983 Defence Review, the Army's command structure was adjusted to distinguish more clearly the separate roles of operations and base support training. There was an internal reorganisation within the Army General Staff, and New Zealand Land Forces Command in Takapuna was split into a Land Force Command and a Support Command. Land Force Command, which from then on comprised 1st Task Force in the North Island and the 3rd Task Force in the South Island, assumed responsibility for operational forces, Territorial Force manpower management and collective training. Support Command which from then on comprised three elements, the Army Training Group in Waiouru, the Force Maintenance Group (FMG) based in Linton, and Base Area Wellington (BAW) based in Trentham, assumed responsibility for individual training, third line logistics and base support. Headquarters Land Force Command remained at Takapuna, and Headquarters Support Command was moved to Palmerston North.

The Army was prepared to field a Ready Reaction Force which was a battalion group based on 2/1 RNZIR; the Integrated Expansion Force (17 units) brigade sized, which would be able to follow up 90 days after mobilisation; and a Force Maintenance Group of 19 units to provide logistical support to both forces.

The battalion in South East Asia, designated 1st Battalion, Royal New Zealand Infantry Regiment by that time, was brought home in 1989.

In the late 1980s, Exercise Golden Fleece was held in the North Island. It was the largest exercise for a long period.

During the later part of the 20th century, New Zealand personnel served in a large number of UN and other peacekeeping deployments including:

- United Nations Truce Supervision Organization for over 50 years in the Middle East
- Operation Agila in Rhodesia
- Multinational Force and Observers (MFO) in the Sinai
- Cambodia where members of the Royal New Zealand Corps of Signals (RNZSigs) were attached to the Australian Force Communications Unit (FCU) of the United Nations Transitional Authority in Cambodia.
- The New Zealand Supply Contingent Somalia of the larger United Nations Operation in Somalia I and United Nations Operation in Somalia II until March 1994.
- United Nations Accelerated Demining Programme (ADP) in Mozambique
- United Nations Angola Verification Mission II in Angola
- United Nations Protection Force in Bosnia
- The Endeavour Peace Accord, Bougainville

In 1994, the Army was granted a status of iwidom as "Ngāti Tūmatauenga" with the blessings of the Māori Queen Te Atairangikaahu and surrounding tribes of the base in Waiouru: Ngāti Tūwharetoa, Ngāti Kahungunu, Ngāti Maniapoto and Ngāti Tuhoe.

=== Recent history (1999–present) ===
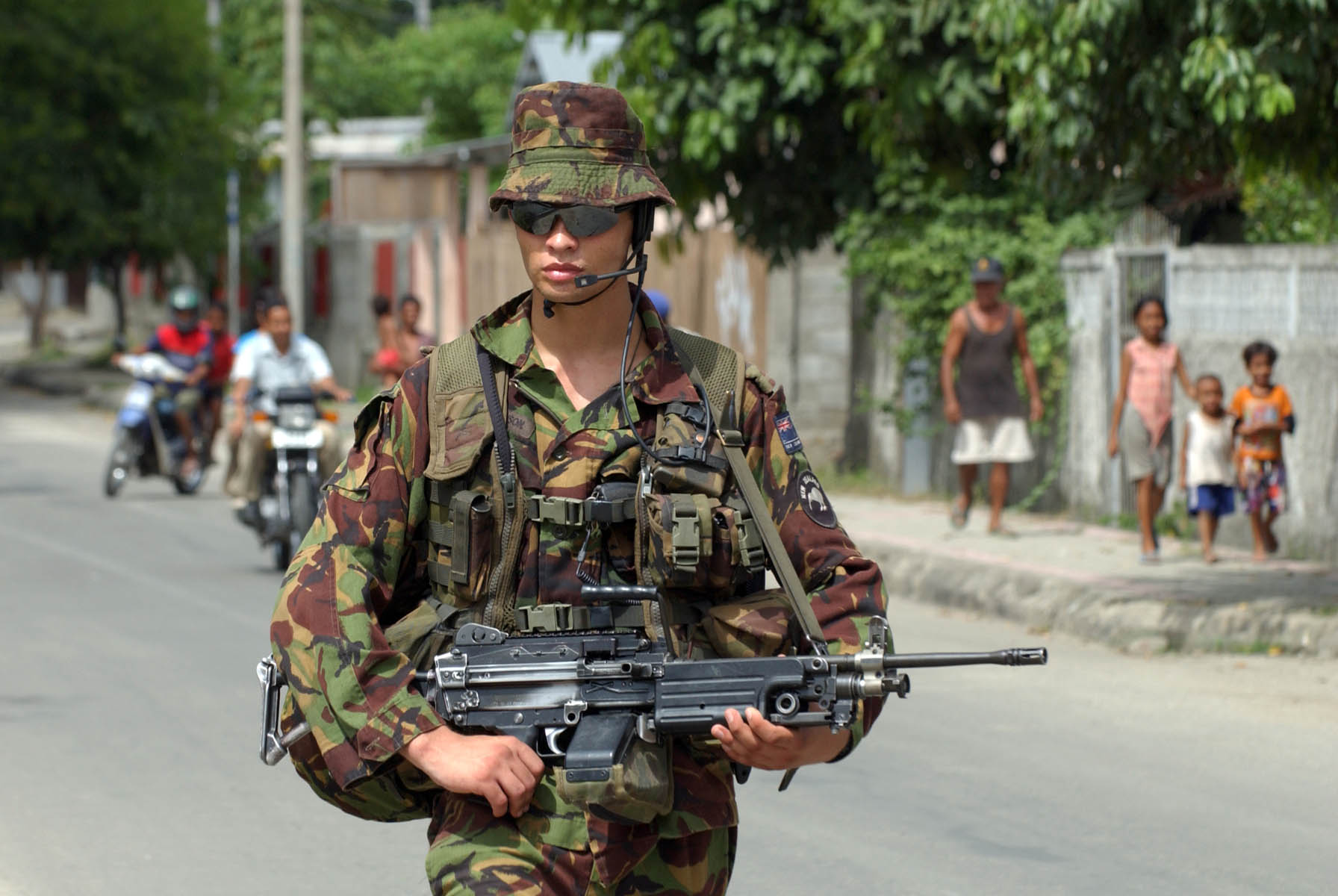
A member of 1 RNZIR in East Timor during 2007

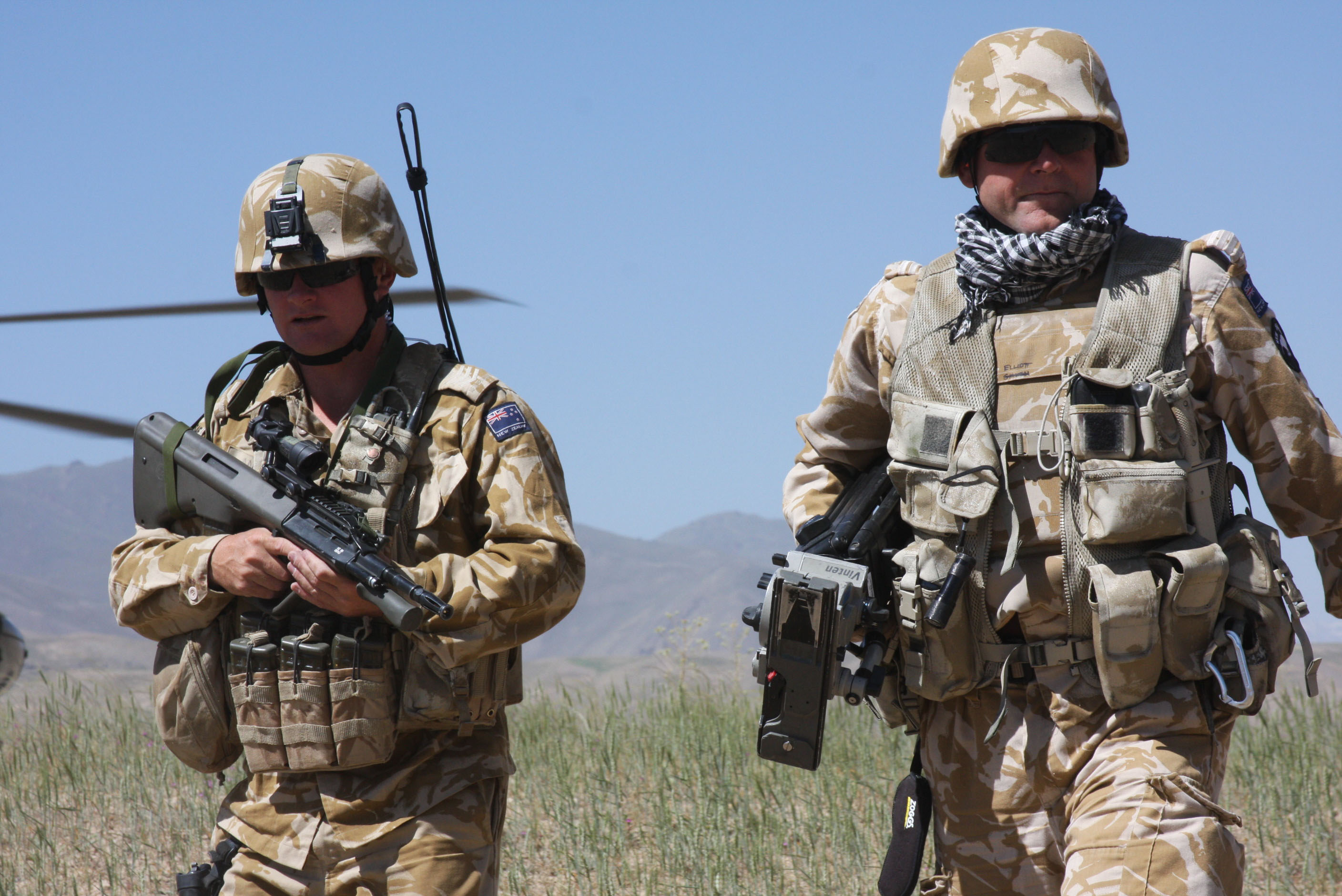
New Zealand soldiers in Afghanistan 2009

In the 21st century, New Zealanders have served in East Timor (1999 onwards), Afghanistan, and Iraq.

NZDF forces have also been involved in international Peacekeeping actions such as Regional Assistance Mission to Solomon Islands (2003–2015), United Nations Mission in the Republic of South Sudan (2003–), United Nations Mine Action Coordination Centre in Southern Lebanon (2007–2008), and United Nations Mission in the Republic of South Sudan (2011.)

In 2003, the New Zealand government decided to replace its existing fleet of M113 armoured personnel carriers, purchased in the 1960s, with the Canadian-built NZLAV, and the M113s were decommissioned by the end of 2004. An agreement made to sell the M113s via an Australian weapons dealer in February 2006 had to be cancelled when the US State Department refused permission for New Zealand to sell the M113s under a contract made when the vehicles were initially purchased. The fleet of 48 M113 vehicles was ultimately sold for scrap to a New Zealand company in 2006. The replacement of the M113s with the General Motors LAV III (NZLAV) led to a review in 2001 on the purchase decision-making by New Zealand's auditor-general. The review found shortcomings in the defence acquisition process, but not in the eventual vehicle selection. In 2010, the government said it would look at the possibility of selling 35 LAVs, around a third of the fleet, as being surplus to requirements.

On 4 September 2010, in the aftermath of the 2010 Canterbury earthquake, the New Zealand Defence Force deployed to the worst affected areas of Christchurch to aid in relief efforts and assist NZ police in enforcing a night time curfew at the request of Christchurch Mayor Bob Parker and Prime Minister John Key.

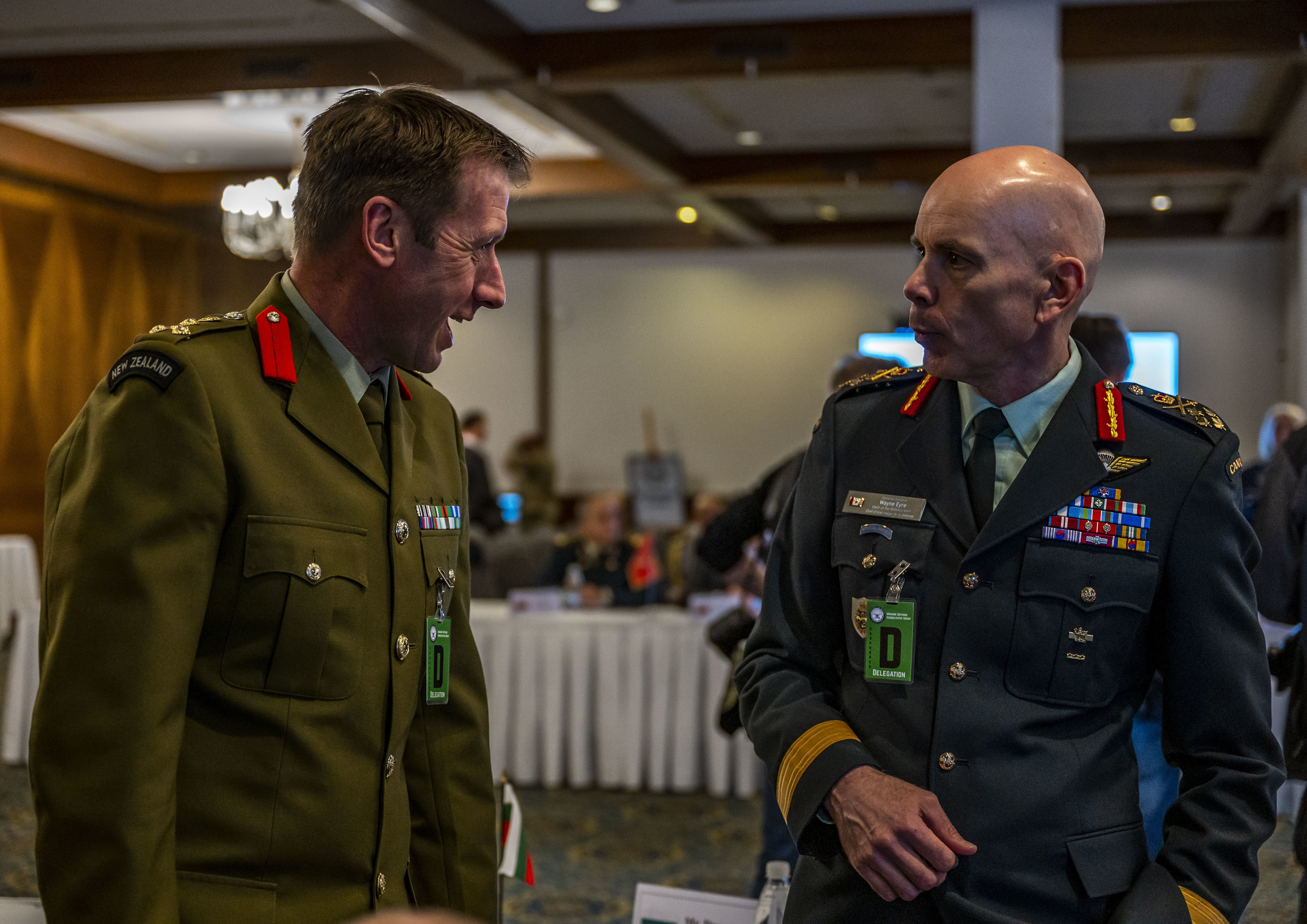
Military members from Canada and New Zealand greet each other at the Ukraine Security Consultative Group at Ramstein Air Base, Germany, April 26, 2022.

On the 21st of March, 2022, New Zealand announced that it would provide NZ$5 million for the purpose of non-lethal military equipment through NATO to Ukraine, following the Russian invasion of Ukraine. In addition, several surplus army equipment was donated, including 473 Enhanced Combat Helmets, 1,066 body armour plates and 571 flak vests and webbing. On the 11th of April this was followed by dispatching 50 troops to Germany, Belgium and the United Kingdom, primarily for logistics and intelligence purposes as a partner of NATO. On the 23rd May 2022 it was announced that the Army was to send 30 soldiers to the United Kingdom to assist in training Ukrainian forces on the L119 light gun as part of Operation Interflex. This was in addition to providing 40 gun sights and ammunition for training purposes. It was announced that further analysts were sent to the United Kingdom on the 27th of June 2022. On the 15th of August, the NZDF announced it would send 120 army instructors to the United Kingdom, for the purposes of training basic infantry. The training is based on an expedited variant of the British Army's basic soldier course, covering weapon handling, combat first aid, operational law and other soldier skills.

At no point were New Zealand forces deployed within Ukraine itself.

== Structure ==
The New Zealand Army is commanded by the Chief of Army (Chief of the General Staff until 2002), who is a major general or two-star appointment. As of 27 August 2024, the current Chief of Army is Major General Rose King. The Chief of Army has responsibility for raising, training and sustaining those forces necessary to meet agreed government outputs. For operations, the Army's combat units fall under the command of the Land Component Commander, who is on the staff of the COMJFNZ at Headquarters Joint Forces New Zealand at Trentham in Upper Hutt. Forces under the Land Component Commander include the 1st Brigade, Training and Doctrine Command, and the Joint Support Group (including health, military police).

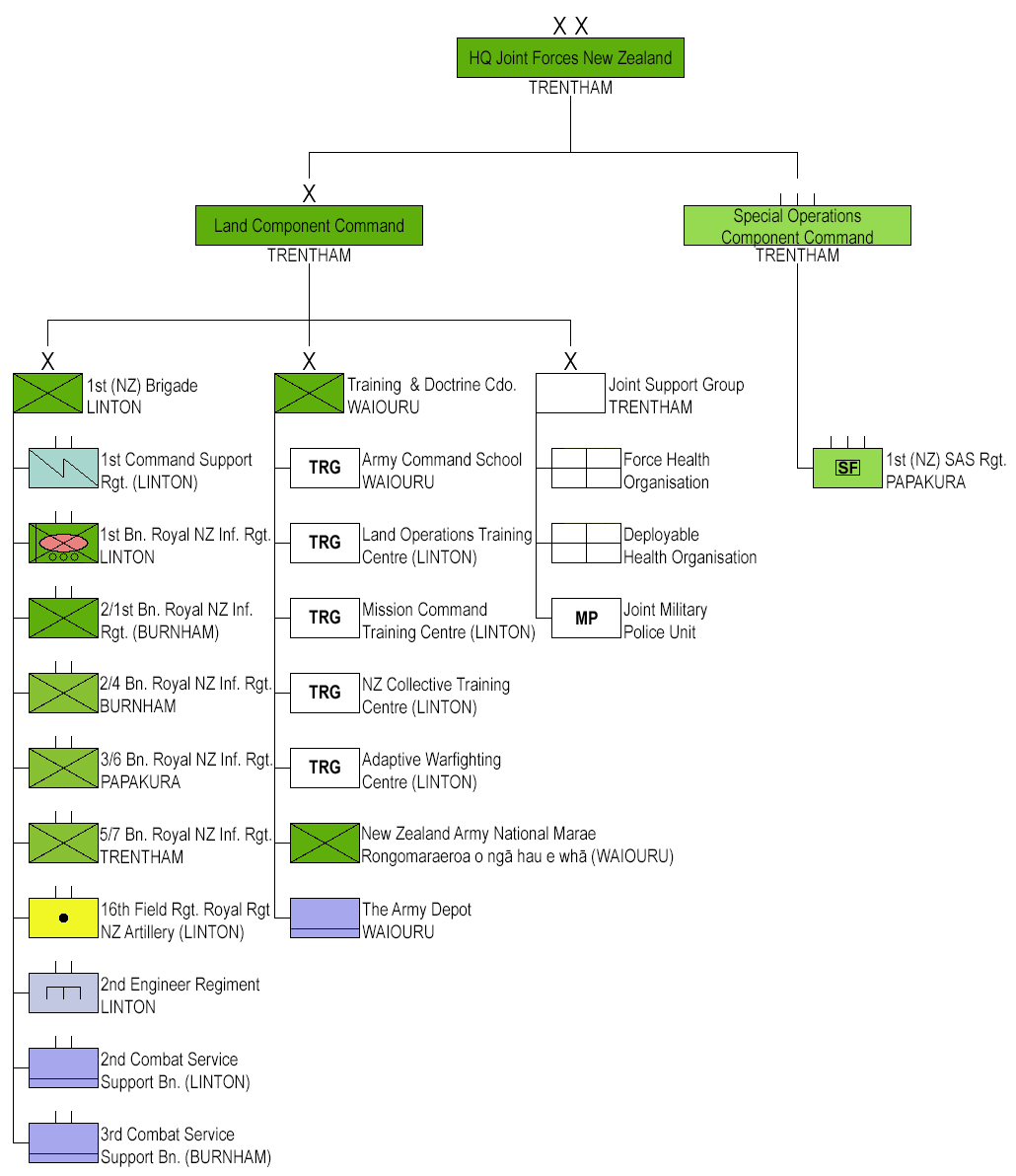
Structure of the New Zealand Army 2025

No. 3 Squadron RNZAF provides tactical air transport.

Land Training and Doctrine Group

- Land Operations Training Centre Waiouru encompasses the main army trade schools:
  - Combat School
  - School of Artillery
  - Logistics Operations School
  - School of Tactics
  - Royal New Zealand School of Signals
  - School of Military Intelligence and Security
  - Trade Training School (Trentham)
  - School of Military Engineering, 2 Engineer Regiment (Linton)

=== Regiments and corps of the New Zealand Army ===
The following is a list of the Corps of the New Zealand Army, ordered according to the traditional seniority of all the Corps.

- New Zealand Corps of Officer Cadets
- Royal New Zealand Armoured Corps
- Royal Regiment of New Zealand Artillery
- The Corps of Royal New Zealand Engineers
- Royal New Zealand Corps of Signals
- Royal New Zealand Infantry Regiment
- New Zealand Special Air Service
- New Zealand Intelligence Corps
- Royal New Zealand Army Logistic Regiment
- Royal New Zealand Army Medical Corps
- Royal New Zealand Dental Corps
- Royal New Zealand Chaplains Department
- New Zealand Army Legal Service
- Royal New Zealand Military Police
- Royal New Zealand Army Education Corps
- New Zealand Army Physical Training Corps
- Royal New Zealand Nursing Corps

=== Army Reserve ===
The Territorial Force (TF), the long established reserve component of the New Zealand Army, has as of 2009–2010 been renamed the Army Reserve, in line with other Commonwealth countries, though the term "Territorial Force" remains the official nomenclature in the Defence Act 1990. It provides individual augmentees and formed bodies for operational deployments. There are Reserve units throughout New Zealand, and they have a long history. The modern Army Reserve is divided into three regionally-based battalion groups. Each of these is made up of smaller units of different specialities. The terms 'regiment' and 'battalion group' seem to be interchangeably used, which can cause confusion. However, it can be argued that both are accurate in slightly different senses. In a tactical sense, given that the Reserve units are groupings of all arms, the term 'battalion group' is accurate, though usually used for a much more single-arm heavy grouping, three infantry companies plus one armoured squadron, for example. NZ reserve battalion groups are composed of a large number of small units of different types.

The term 'regiment' can be accurately applied in the British regimental systems sense, as all the subunits collectively have been given the heritage of the former NZ infantry regiments (1900–1964). TF regiments prepare and provide trained individuals in order to top-up and sustain operational and non-operational units to meet directed outputs. TF regiments perform the function of a training unit, preparing individuals to meet prescribed outputs. The six regiments command all Territorial Force personnel within their region except those posted to formation or command headquarters, Military Police (MP) Company, Force Intelligence Group (FIG) or 1 New Zealand Special Air Services (NZSAS) Regiment. At a minimum, each regiment consists of a headquarters, a recruit induction training (RIT) company, at least one rifle company, and a number of combat support or combat service support companies or platoons.

3/1st Battalion, Royal New Zealand Infantry Regiment, previously existed on paper as a cadre. If needed, it would have been raised to full strength through the regimentation of the Territorial Force infantry units. Army plans now envisage a three manoeuvre unit structure of 1 RNZIR, QAMR, and 2/1 RNZIR (light), being brought up to strength by TF individual and subunit reinforcements.

The New Zealand Cadet Corps also exists as an army-affiliated youth training and development organisation, part of the New Zealand Cadet Forces.

A rationalisation plan to amalgamate the then existing six Reserve Regiments to three, and to abolish one third of Reserve personnel posts, had been mooted for some years. This was finally agreed by the New Zealand government in August 2011, and was implemented in 2012.

The New Zealand Scottish Regiment, a Territorial Force regiment first established in January 1939, and perpetuating the battle honours of the Divisional Cavalry of the 2nd New Zealand Division, was finally disbanded in April 2016. After a final parade on 16 April 2016, its Regimental Colours were laid up in the Toitu Otago Settlers Museum, Dunedin.

The Territorial Forces Employer Support Council is an organisation that provides support to Reserve personnel of all three services and their civilian employers. It is a national organisation appointed by the minister of defence to work with employers and assist in making Reserve personnel available for operational deployments.

== Personnel ==
=== Strength ===
The Army comprises around 4,659 Regular Force personnel and 2,122 Reserve Force personnel.

=== Uniforms ===
Like all Commonwealth countries uniforms of the New Zealand Army had historically followed those of the British Army. From World War II until the late 1950s British Battledress was worn, with British-issue "Jungle Greens" being used as field wear with Beret or Khaki Cap and British Boonie hat (usually called a "J hat") during the Malayan Emergency, Borneo and the earlier stages of the Vietnam War.

After initially serving with the U.S Army, New Zealand forces in Vietnam were amalgamated into the 1st Australian Task Force in 1966 and adopted Australian Jungle Greens ("JGs") from 1967. Uniforms were initially supplied from 1ATF stocks but were eventually made in New Zealand. In the early part of the war New Zealanders wore a black cravat embroidered with a small white Kiwi bird, a practice which began in Borneo in 1966. At first this was worn as part of the formal dress (although never official) but as the JGs worn by New Zealanders were almost identical to their Australian counterparts, the cravat was then sometimes worn on operations to distinguish them from Australians. Some local acquisition of U.S uniforms and equipment also occurred. The American uniforms were said to be popular with platoon leaders, mortar crew, and artillery men due to ease of carrying maps and documents. The Australian JGs underwent some modifications to resemble U.S fatigues in 1968 and these new uniforms, nicknamed "pixie suits" (for the slant of the shirt pockets) were worn by New Zealand and Australian troops until the end of the war.

The New Zealand Special Air Service were issued with standard U.S battle dress uniform fatigues in ERDL camouflage pattern during the Vietnam War period and through the 1970s thereafter.

Jungle Greens continued to be used as field wear by the New Zealand Army throughout the 1970s until the introduction of Military camouflage in 1980 and a return to British-style field uniforms. British DPM was adopted in 1980 as the camouflage pattern for clothing, the colours of which were further modified several times to better suit New Zealand conditions. This evolved pattern is now officially referred to as New Zealand disruptive pattern material (NZDPM.) Reforms in 1997 saw British-influenced modifications to the New Zealand combat uniform.

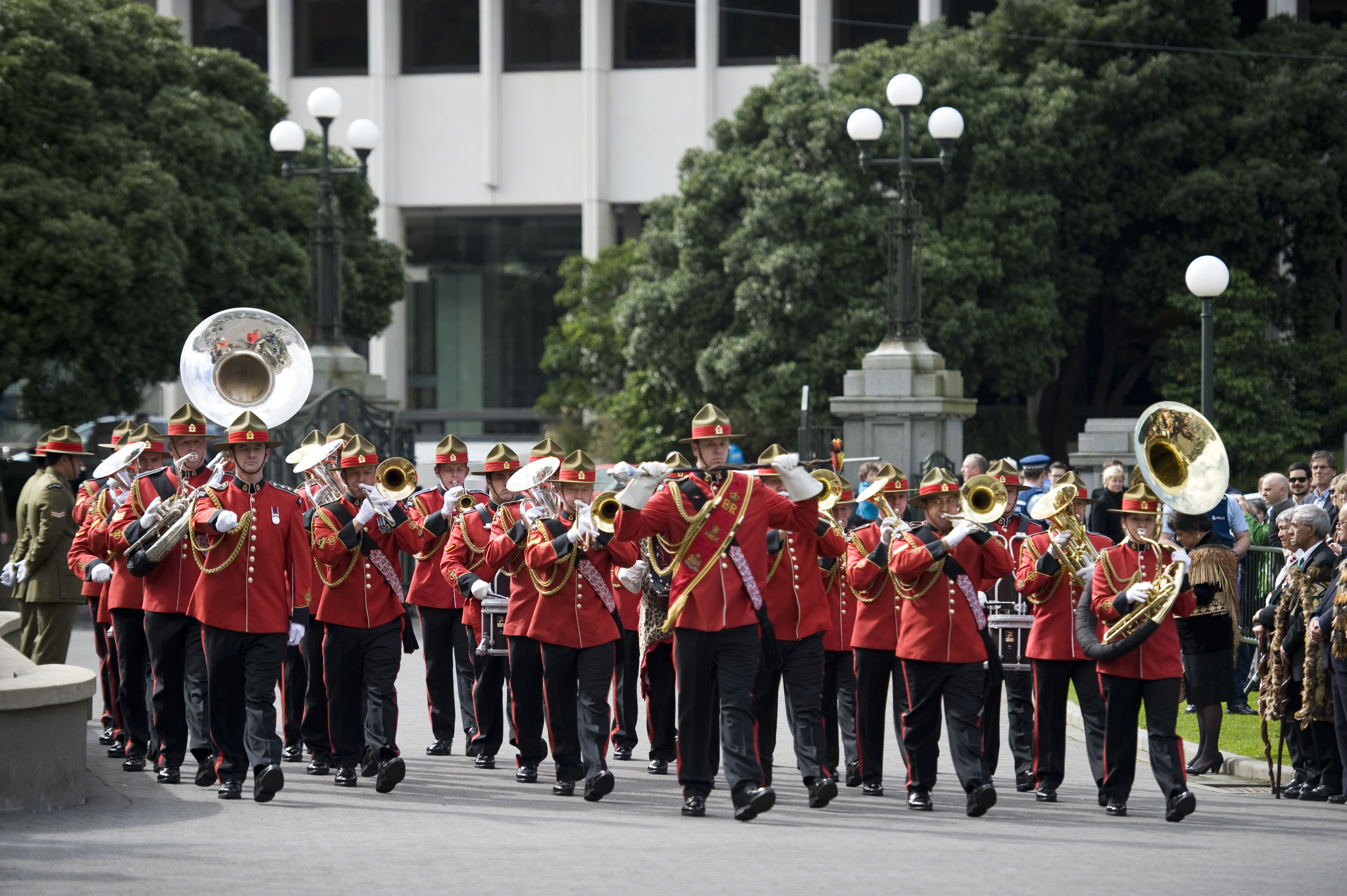
Members of the New Zealand Army Band wear the distinctive "lemon squeezer" Campaign hat with full dress uniform.

The high crowned Campaign hat, nicknamed the "lemon squeezer" in New Zealand, was for decades the most visible national distinction. This was adopted by the Taranaki Regiment about 1911 and became general issue for all New Zealand units during the latter stages of World War I. The different branches of service were distinguished by coloured puggaree or wide bands around the base of the crown (blue and red for artillery, green for mounted rifles, khaki and red for infantry etc.). The "lemon squeezer" was worn to a certain extent during World War II, although often replaced by more convenient forage caps or berets, or helmets. After being in abeyance since the 1950s, the Campaign hat was reintroduced for ceremonial wear in 1977 for Officer cadets and the New Zealand Army Band.

The M1 steel helmet was the standard combat helmet from 1960 to 2000 although the "boonie hat," was common in overseas theatres, such as in the Vietnam War. New Zealand forces also used the U.S PASGT helmet until 2009 after which the Australian Enhanced Combat Helmet became the standard-issue helmet until 2019. The current combat helmet is the Viper P4 Advanced Combat Helmet by Revision Military.

In the 1990s a universal pattern mess uniform replaced various regimental and corps mess dress uniforms previously worn. The mess uniform is worn by officers and senior NCOs for formal evening occasions.

The wide-brimmed khaki slouch hat known as the Mounted Rifles Hat (MRH) with green puggaree replaced the khaki "No 2" British Army peaked cap as service dress headdress for all branches in 1998.

From 2002 under a "one beret" policy, berets of all branches of service are now universally rifle-green, with the exceptions only of the tan beret of the New Zealand Special Air Service and the blue beret of the New Zealand Defence Force Military Police.

In 2003 a desert DPM pattern, also based on the British pattern was in use with New Zealand peacekeeping forces in Iraq, Afghanistan and Africa. NZ SAS soldiers serving in Afghanistan were issued with Australian-sourced uniforms in Crye MultiCam camouflage.

In 2008 the field uniform was updated to the modern ACU style and made in ripstop material.

In 2012 the MRH became the standard Army ceremonial headdress with the "lemon squeezer" being retained only for colour parties and other limited categories.

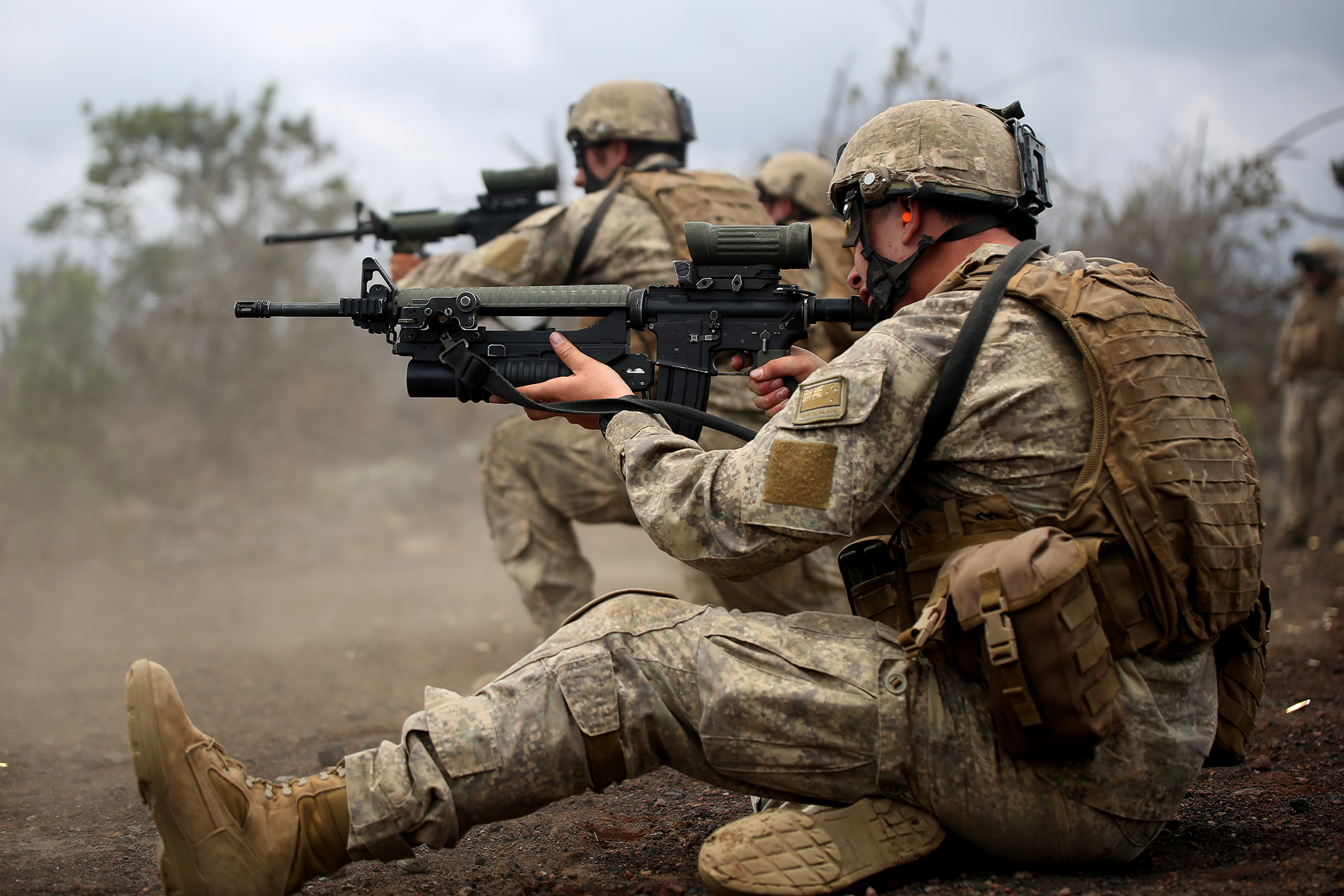
The previous NZ Army MCU uniform, in service from 2013 to 2020

NZDPM and NZDDPM were replaced in 2013 by a single camouflage pattern and a new uniform called the New Zealand Multi Terrain Camouflage Uniform (MCU.) The shirt remains in an ACU-style however the pants are based on the Crye G3 combat pant with removable knee pads, usually otherwise associated with Special Forces and Police tactical unit assault uniforms. The MCU, with the addition of a beret or sometimes the Mounted Rifles Hat, was the working uniform for all branches and divisions of the NZ Army, and certain units within the RNZN and RNZAF. After several years in service, modifications to the uniform have since followed with a change in material to Teredo (polyester/cotton twill) for both uniform and boonie hat, a return to covered buttons, and the removal of the elbow and knee pad pockets. In late 2020, due to shortcomings and poor performances of the MCU uniform, the MCU's experienced issues such as the camouflage not working effectively in the New Zealand environment and poor quality of the uniform resulted in it deteriorating quickly from constant use. The New Zealand Army has begun replacing the MCUs with a new camouflage pattern called NZMTP, based on the British Multi-Terrain Pattern (MTP), using a Multicam colour palette, produced by Crye Precision in the United States. The new uniforms will revert to the 2008 cut and be manufactured locally.

Uniform accessories such as plate carriers, webbing, belts and wet weather clothing will be purchased in MultiCam pattern to source using the current market and reduce costs.

=== Rank structure and insignia ===
Rank group	General / flag officers				Senior officers			Junior officers
New Zealand Army
New Zealand Army	Field marshal	Lieutenant-general	Major-general	Brigadier	Colonel	Lieutenant-colonel	Major	Captain	Lieutenant	Second lieutenant

Rank group	Senior NCOs				Junior NCOs		Enlisted
New Zealand Army							No insignia
New Zealand Army	Warrant officer class 1	Warrant officer class 2	Staff sergeant	Sergeant	Corporal	Lance corporal	Private (or equivalent)

== Equipment ==
=== Infantry ===
The New Zealand Army's primary service weapon is the Modular Assault Rifle System - Light (MARS-L) assault rifle, which is used by all service branches of the New Zealand Defence Force. The weapon can be equipped with accessories such as an ACOG sight, M203 grenade launcher or M7 bayonet. Some soldiers are equipped with the Designated Marksman Weapon (DMW), equipped with a telescopic Leupold & Stevens sight allowing for increased accuracy at range. The Glock 17 Gen 4 is used as a sidearm.

The Standard Helmet takes the form of the OPS-CORE Hi Cut Ballistic helmet which will provide level 3 protection for low – medium ballistic threat/non blast operating environments, currently being introduced since July 2024 as part of the SSPE project starting with Tranche 1 and replacing the Viper P4 ACH with level 4 protection which will remain in service for higher threat (including blast) environments.

The ballistic vest being introduced under the SSPE project is the TBAS Plate Carrier, which is set to replace the TYR EPIC Body Armour in low- to medium-threat, non-blast operational environments. However the TYR EPIC Body Armour will remain in use for Higher threat environments .

Supporting fire is provided by FN Minimi, MAG 58, while the Barrett MRAD and Barrett M107A1 sniper rifles are used in a sniper rifle and anti-materiel rifle role. The Benelli M3 shotgun and 40mm Grenade Machine Gun (GMG) are additionally available in a supporting role.

A variety of anti-armour equipment is used, including the Javelin Medium Range Anti-Armour Weapon (MRAAW), L14A1 Medium Direct Fire Support Weapon and Short-Range Anti-Armour Weapon (M72 LAW).

=== Mortars and artillery ===
The Royal Regiment of New Zealand Artillery is equipped with several light mortar and artillery systems. Indirect fire is provided through the use of 60 mm and 81 mm mortar systems with the Hirtenberger M6, Hirtenberger M8 and L16A2. The British L119 light gun is operated in the artillery role.

=== Armour ===
The New Zealand Army makes use of the Bushmaster Protected Mobility Vehicle and the NZLAV operated by the 1st Battalion (motorised) Royal New Zealand Infantry Regiment and the Royal New Zealand Armoured Corps

=== Transport and utility vehicles ===
A variety of transport and utility vehicles are used, principally including the Mercedes-Benz Unimog and its replacement, the Rheinmetall MAN RMMV HX series of military trucks. Other vehicles include the Polaris MRZR light vehicle, and the JCB High Mobility Engineer Excavator. In November 2024, the Army ordered 40 VAMTAC CK3 medium utility vehicles and 20 VAMTAC ST5 light utility vehicles to be delivered from 2027 to replace part of its Unimog and Pinzgauer fleet.

== Operational deployments ==
The New Zealand Army currently has personnel deployed overseas on active service in:

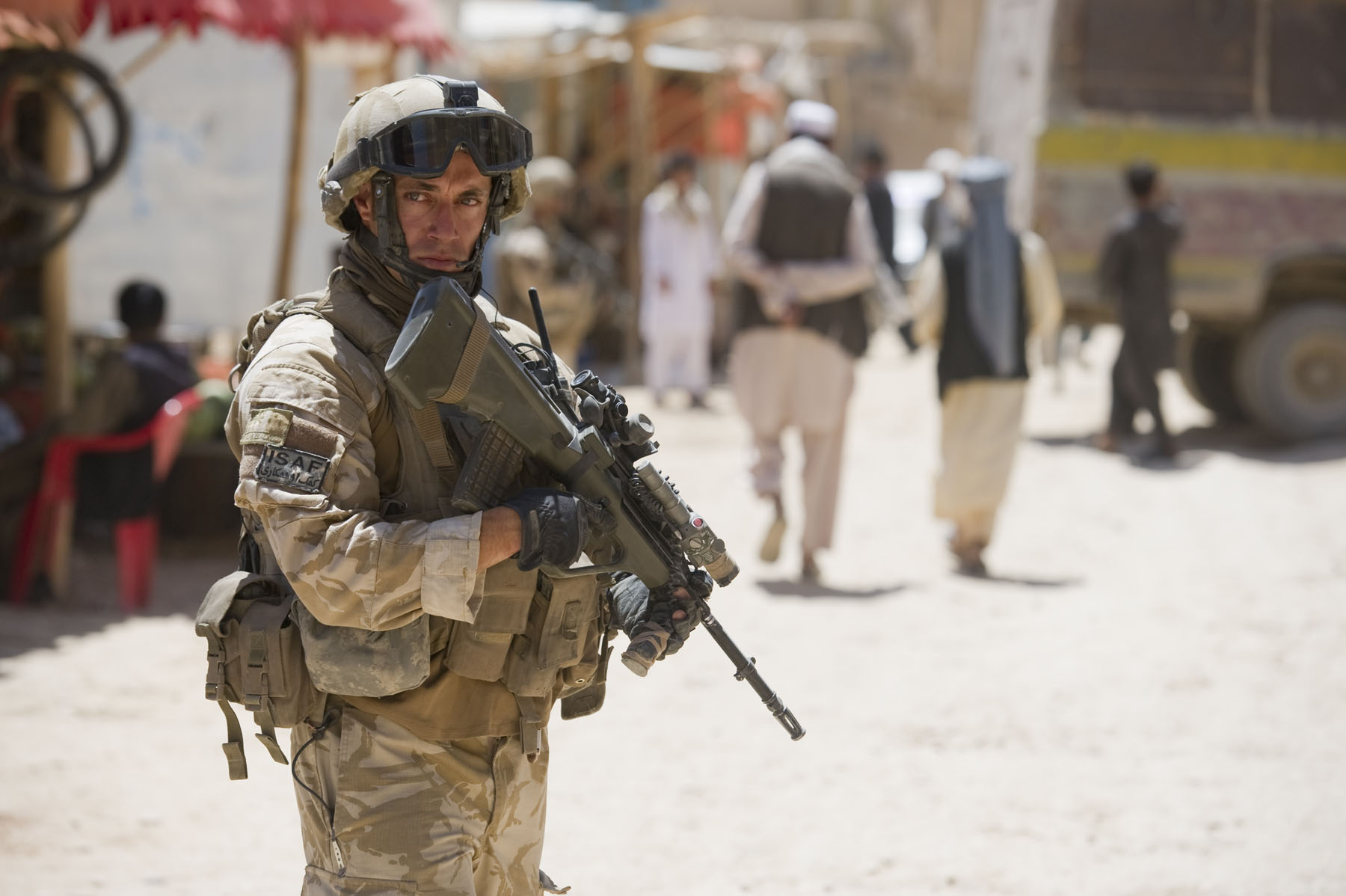
A New Zealand Army soldier in Afghanistan during 2011

- The Golan Heights (up to 8 personnel) as part of the United Nations Disengagement Observer Force.
- Egypt (up to 28 personnel) as part of the Multinational Force.
- Jordan (less than 10 personnel) as part of Operation Gallant Phoenix, which is due to expire in June 2027.
- The Korean Peninsula (up to 12 personnel), in support of the United Nations Command Headquarters and Military Armistice Commission, with the mandate for this deployment due to expire in September 2026. Additional military personnel are also involved in enforcing sanctions against North Korea in the North Asia area.
- South Sudan (up to 3 personnel), as part of the United Nations Mission in South Sudan, with the mandate for this deployment due to expire in September 2026.

In addition, personnel are also deployed on non-operational missions (such as providing support and training to partner nations, and gathering and analysing intelligence) in a number of locations including in Europe as part of Operation Tieke, providing support to Ukraine outside of its territory as part of the Russo-Ukrainian War.

=== Former ===
- Afghanistan – Mentoring at the Afghan National Army Officer Training Academy. The NZ Provincial Reconstruction Team (New Zealand) (NZ PRT), ended in April 2013.
- Iraq. Whilst New Zealand troops were not deployed as part of the original invasion of Iraq in 2003, a contingent of troops were deployed to assist with reconstruction following the invasion. Following the withdrawal of international forces from Iraq and the rise of the Islamic State in the region, New Zealand forces returned to Iraq as part of the international coalition of forces constituting Operation Inherent Resolve. The New Zealand contingent assisted in training Iraqi troops and supporting coalition efforts to strike ISIS. New Zealand withdrew once more from Iraq in 2023.
- Solomon Islands as part of the Solomon Islands International Assistance Forces supporting the Royal Solomon Islands Police Force following a period of civil unrest. This deployment ended in August 2024, with the Army's mandate having been renewed a number of times.

== Commemorations ==
New Zealand Army Day is celebrated on 25 March, the date in 1845 when the New Zealand Legislative Council passed the first Militia Act.

ANZAC Day is the main annual commemorative activity for New Zealand soldiers. On 25 April each year the landings at Gallipoli are remembered, though the day has come to mean remembering the fallen from all wars in which New Zealand has been involved. While a New Zealand public holiday, it is a duty day for New Zealand military personnel, who, even if not involved in official commemorative activities are required to attend an ANZAC Day Dawn Parade in ceremonial uniform in their home location.

Remembrance Day, commemorating the end of World War I on 11 November 1918, is marked by official activities with a military contribution normally with parades and church services on the closest Sunday. However, ANZAC Day has a much greater profile and involves a much higher proportion of military personnel.

New Zealand Wars Day is commemorated on 28 October, this is the national day marking the 19th-century New Zealand Wars.

The various regiments of the New Zealand Army mark their own Corps Days, many of which are derived from those of the corresponding British regiments. Examples are Cambrai Day on 20 November for the Royal New Zealand Armoured Corps, St Barbara's Day on 4 December for the Royal Regiment of New Zealand Artillery.

== See also ==
- Military history of New Zealand
- New Zealand Defence Force
- New Zealand Cadet Corps
- List of individual weapons of the New Zealand Defence Force
- List of equipment of the New Zealand Army
- List of former equipment of the New Zealand Army
- New Zealand Defence College
- New Zealand military ranks
- Tanks of New Zealand

== Bibliography ==
- Cooke, Peter (2016). Defending New Zealand: Ramparts on the Seas 1840-1950s. Wellington: Defence of New Zealand Study Group. ISBN 978-0-473-06833-2.
- Cooke, Peter; Crawford, John (2011). The Territorials: The History of the Territorial and Volunteer Forces of New Zealand. Auckland: Random House. ISBN 9781869794460.
- Crawford, John; Harper, Glyn (2001). Operation East Timor: The New Zealand Defence Force in East Timor 1999–2001. Auckland: Reed Publishing. ISBN 0790008238.
- Major G.J. Clayton, The New Zealand Army, A History from the 1840s to the 1990s, New Zealand Army, Wellington, 1990
- Damien Marc Fenton, A False Sense of Security?, Centre for Strategic Studies New Zealand
- Malcolm Thomas and Cliff Lord, New Zealand Army Distinguishing Patches 1911–1991, ISBN 0-473-03288-0
