= List of equipment of the New Zealand Army =

This is a list of equipment of the New Zealand Army currently in use. It includes small arms, combat vehicles, aircraft, watercraft, artillery and transport vehicles. The New Zealand Army is the principal land warfare force of New Zealand, a part of the New Zealand Defence Force. Since the ANZUS breakup and the end of the Cold War, the New Zealand Army has been deployed to a number of conflict zones, often as part of a coalition force or part of a United Nations peacekeeping operation.

== Infantry section equipment ==
A standard New Zealand infantry section consists of ten soldiers, divided into two five-men infantry fireteams. While equipment formations can be tailored as required by section and platoon commanders, infantry sections are usually issued with the following:

=== Weapons ===
- Eight LMT MARS-L rifles, two of which are usually equipped with an M203 under-barrel grenade launcher.
- One LMT 308 MWS designated marksman rifle.
- One FN Minimi 7.62 light machine gun.
- Nine M7 bayonets for use with LMT MARS-L and LMT 308 MWS rifles.

=== Vision systems ===
- Advanced Combat Optical Gunsight (ACOG) to be used with the LMT MARS-L rifle.
- Leupold & Stevens Mark 6 telescopic sight to be used with the LMT 308 MWS designated marksman rifle.
- Dueck Defense rapid transition sight to be used with the LMT 308 MWS designated marksman rifle.

== Weapons ==
Model	Image	Origin	Type	Calibre	Notes
Combat Knife
M7 bayonet		United States	Bayonet	—	
Handguns
Glock 17, 4th gen		Austria	Semi-automatic pistol	9×19mm Parabellum	Standard issue pistol.
Submachine guns
Heckler & Koch MP5		West Germany	Submachine gun	9×19mm Parabellum	Used by the New Zealand Special Air Service.
Assault rifles & Battle rifles
LMT MARS-L; LMT = Lewis Machine & Tool Company; MARS-L = Modular Assault Rifle System - Light		United States	Assault rifle	5.56×45mm NATO	Standard issue assault rifle. Adopted in 2015 to replace the Steyr AUG. Ordered in 2 different barrel lengths, and equipped with: Trijicon ACOG scope; RMR red dot mounted on top; M7 bayonet
M4 carbine		United States	Carbine	5.56×45mm NATO	Used by New Zealand Special Air Service.
Precision rifles
LMT 308 MWS; Modular Weapon System		United States	DMR; Designated marksman rifle	7.62×51mm NATO	Standard issue DMR. Adopted in October 2011. Equipment: Leupold adjustable 4.5-14 × scope; Canted iron sights; Foldable foregrip
Barrett MRAD; Multi-role Adaptive Design		United States	Bolt action sniper rifle	7.62×51mm NATO (for training); 8.6×70mm (operational calibre)	Introduced in 2018, replacement of the Accuracy International Arctic Warfare. Equipment: ATACR 5-25×56 F1 Nightforce scope
Barrett M107A1		United States	Anti materiel sniper rifle	12.7×99mm NATO	Introduced in 2018.
Machine guns
FN Minimi TR; Known as "7.62 LSW Minimi" in NZ forces		Belgium	Light machine gun	7.62×51mm NATO	Standard issue Light Support Weapon. In use in the Army since 1988. Selected in February 2012 to replace the C9 LSW Minimi and will be known as the 7.62 LSW Minimi in NZDF service.
FN MAG 58		Belgium	General-purpose machine gun	7.62×51mm NATO	The Belgian FN MAG replaced the L7A2 variant of the FN MAG that was purchased in 1976. Used on vehicles as sustained fire machine gun.: NZLAV; LOV (Pinzgauer); NH-90
Browning M2HB-QCB		United States	Heavy machine gun	12.7×99mm NATO	Used as heavy support weapon, mounted on vehicles, and some on tripods on some advanced positions.
Shotguns
Benelli M3		Italy	Hybrid Pump action /Semi Automatic shotgun	12 gauge	Introduced in 2006.
Grenade launchers and ammunition
M203		United States	Under-barrel grenade launcher	40×46mm LV	Used with the: LMT MARS-L; M4 carbine
Heckler & Koch GMG		Germany	Automatic grenade launcher	40×53mm HV	
Anti-tank weapons
M72 LAW "66 mm Short-Range Anti-Armour Weapon"		Norway; United States	Anti-tank rocket launcher	66mm	3200 in stock March 2021. A single shot disposable anti-armour weapon.
Carl Gustav M3 "L14A1 Carl Gustav Medium Direct Fire Support Weapon"		Sweden	Recoilless rifle	84mm	43 M3s in service as of June 2015. 26 M4 variants acquired as replacement of M3 systems in 2026 (delivery in 2027).
Javelin MRAAW "Medium Range Anti-Armour Weapon"		United States	ATGM "Anti-tank guided missile"	127mm	24 launchers and 164 missiles ordered in 2004; 10 missiles ordered in 2014

== Indirect fire ==
=== Mortars ===
Model	Image	Origin	Type	Calibre	Number	Details
Hirtenberger M6		Austria	Infantry mortar	60mm	32	
Hirtenberger M8		Austria	Mortar	81mm		
L16A2		Canada United Kingdom	Mortar	81mm	50	

=== Artillery ===
Model	Image	Origin	Type	Calibre	Number	Details
L119 light gun		United Kingdom	Field gun	105 mm	24 in inventory	Ammunition used: US M1
Ordnance QF 25-pounder		United Kingdom	Ceremonial gun	3.45-inch (87.6 mm)	7 in inventory	Retired from operational service in September 1977. Four 25-pounder guns are used by the ceremonial saluting battery at Point Jerningham, Wellington for official events. The 25-pounder is also used as the official funeral gun carriage.

== Vehicles ==
Model	Image	Origin	Type	Number	Details
Armoured vehicles
NZLAV		Canada	Infantry fighting vehicle	73 (+8 surplus)	Wheeled infantry fighting vehicle, a variant of the Canadian LAV III. Originally 105 NZLAVs, including 95 Infantry Mobility Vehicle (IMV), 7 Light Obstacle Blade Vehicle (LOB) and 3 Recovery Vehicle (LAV-R). In 2003, the New Zealand armed forces purchased 105 LAV (Light Armored Vehicle) from Canada, of which 102 were standard vehicles (LOB is a standard NZLAV with a bulldozer blade attached) and 3 were redesigned for recovery. In 2010, the government said it would look at the possibility of selling 35 LAVs, around a third of the fleet, as being surplus to requirements. In 2012, 20 NZLAVs were made available to be sold, and in 2019 this amount was raised to 30. On 20 April 2022, New Zealand Defence Force (NZDF) announced that they had sold 22 NZLAVs to Chilean Navy. After the sale to Chile, NZDF still had 8 NZLAVs in their inventory for sale. One NZLAV has been written off after being damaged in Afghanistan and one NZLAV is being used in Canada (source country for NZLAV) as a test vehicle. 73 NZLAVs remain in service with NZDF as of April 2022.
Bushmaster Protected Mobility Vehicle		Australia	Protected vehicle	48	The New Zealand Special Air Service operates five Thales Bushmasters designated the Special Operations Vehicle - Protected Heavy (SOV-PH), purchased from Australian Defence Force stock. The Army acquired 43 Bushmaster NZ5.5 variants to replace the existing fleet of armored NZLOVs (armoured Pinzgauer vehicles), with the last deliveries arriving by 22 August 2024.
Transport vehicles
Polaris MRZR		United States	Utility Task Vehicle	6	The MRZR is a militarised version of the Polaris RZR recreational vehicle. It is diesel powered, fitted with run flat tires and an infra-red light to aid driving using night vision goggles. Issued to the High Readiness Company of the 1st Battalion, Royal New Zealand Infantry Regiment (1 RNZIR).
Supacat HMT Extenda "SOV MH - Special operations vehicle Mobility Heavy"		United Kingdom	Special operations vehicle	6	The New Zealand Special Air Service operate an undisclosed number of Supacat HMT Extenda vehicles designated the Special Operations Vehicles - Mobility Heavy (SOV-MH) that entered service in 2018. The SOV-MH replaced the Pinzgauer Special Operations (MV-SO) vehicle.
Pinzgauer High-Mobility All-Terrain Vehicle		Austria	All-wheel drive vehicle	321	The NZ Army operates 321 Pinzgauer vehicles in eight variants to fulfill the Light Operational Vehicle (LOV) role. They are currently being replaced under the Protected Mobility Project.
Mercedes-Benz Unimog		West Germany / Germany	Medium vehicle	82	Planned to be replaced under the Garrison Support & Training vehicle project. Used for support during the 2021 Canterbury Flooding.
RMMV Medium and Heavy Operational Vehicle		Austria; Germany	Medium/Heavy vehicle Bridging Vehicle; Heavy recovery vehicle	197	The NZ Army operates 194 RMMV: HX58 - 4×4; HX60 - 6×6; HX77 - 8×8 Medium and Heavy Operational Vehicles (MHOV). Brought into service in the mid-2010s to replace parts of the aging Unimog U1700 fleet.; The Rapidly Emplaced Bridge System provides a bridging capability to support the NZLAV.
Mercedes-Benz Actros		Germany	Heavy vehicle	4	In 2010, New Zealand purchased 4 Actros to haul adjustable-width quad-axle low-loader semitrailers primarily for the transportation of NZLAVs.
Recovery vehicles
RMMB HX44M - Heavy recovery vehicles		Austria; Germany	Wrecker	3	Ordered in 2018, delivered in 2021, lift tow capacity of 15 tons.
Engineering vehicles
MAN / GDELS REBS Truck; Rapidly Emplaced Bridging System		Germany	Bridge laying vehicle	—	
JCB HMEE		United Kingdom		6	In 2011, six JCB High Mobility Engineer Excavator (HMEE) combat tractors were delivered to the Army, operated in support of combat engineers.
CAT 938K		United States; United Kingdom	Track laying vehicle	2	Equipped with the FAUN M30H Trackway Dispenser.
BPRV		United States; New Zealand	Beach preparation and recovery vehicle	2	Based on Caterpillar D555 'forestry skidder'. In service with the Amphibious Beach Team, 5 Movements Company.
Manitou MLT/MHT-X Series		France	Telehandler	At least 14	Nine MLT-X 625 75H. One MHT-X 10130 (as of 2021). Four MHT-X 10230.
Support vehicles
Nissan Navara		Japan	Support vehicle	30	
Mitsubishi Triton		Japan	Support vehicle	130	
Toyota RAV4		Japan	Support vehicle		
Ford Ranger		USA	Military police vehicle	18	Emergency Response Vehicles of the Joint Military Police Unit (JMPU) of the Joint Support Group (JSG)
Yutong ZK6760		China	Bus	2	12 on order
Iveco Daily		Italy	Ambulance	12	
MAN TGM 15.290		Germany	Fire truck	1	
Scania P93		Sweden	Fire truck	3	
Scania G93		Sweden	Fire truck	2	
Volvo FL280		Sweden	Fire truck		
International 1810		United States	Fire truck	1	

== Watercraft ==
Name	Image	Origin	Type	Number	Details
FC530 MilPro Zodiac		France	Rigid inflatable boat		Both FC470 (4.7m) and FC530 (5.3m) variants in service.

== Electronic warfare and communications ==
Name	Image	Origin	Type	Number	Details
L3Harris AN/PRC-158		United States	Tactical radio		
L3Harris AN/PRC-160		United States	Tactical radio		
L3Harris AN/PRC-163		United States	Combat radio		
L3Harris RF-7850S		United States	Combat radio		
AN/TPQ-49 LCMR "Lightweight Counter Mortar Radar"		United States	Counter battery radar	4	

== Unmanned aerial vehicles ==
Name	Image	Origin	Type	Number	Details
Quantum Vector VTOL		Germany	Tiltrotor UAV		Used for reconnaissance and fire correction by the Royal Regiment of New Zealand Artillery.
AeroVironment RQ-20 Puma		United States	Unmanned aerial vehicle	1	A single Puma is in operational service.
Skycam Kahu		New Zealand	Training and limited battlefield surveillance	at least 6	Kahu was developed by the Defence Technology Agency. It served as a vehicle for technology development and enabled the NZDF to gain first-hand experience as an RPAS operator. Kahu has also been deployed operationally on a limited basis.
Skydio RQ-28A		United States	Reconnaissance quadcopter		Used for reconnaissance by the Royal New Zealand Infantry Regiment.
DJI Mavic Pro		China	Training and experimentation purposes	26	Used as a concept, training and experimentation platform to assist the army in assessing future use cases for UAS systems. These systems are used only in unclassified training space, never connected to the Internet or NZDF networks, and are not for deployment.
DJI Phantom 4		China	Training and experimentation purposes	1	Used as a concept, training and experimentation platform to assist the army in assessing future use cases for UAS systems. These systems are used only in unclassified training space, never connected to the Internet or NZDF networks, and are not for deployment.
Teledyne FLIR Black Hornet Nano		Norway	Micro aerial vehicle		Used for reconnaissance by the Royal New Zealand Infantry Regiment and New Zealand Special Air Service.

== Future equipment ==
=== Equipment ordered ===
Model	Image	Origin	Type	Quantity ordered	Notes
Military vehicles
URO Vamtac ST5		Spain	Utility light armoured vehicle	20	Successor to the Unimog and the Pinzgauer. Ordered in November 2024 for €56 million. First vehicle arrived in New Zealand in 2025.
Vamtac SK95 CK3		Spain	Utility medium sized vehicle	40	Successor to the Unimog and the Pinzgauer. Ordered in November 2024 for €56 million. First vehicle arrived in New Zealand in 2025.
Daimler Unimog Truck		Germany	Medium Vehicle	61	All ordered together for NZD59.915 million (USD33.5 million) in 2026. These are expected to replace some of the ageing vehicles in the fleet.
Mitsubishi Triton		Japan	Utility vehicle	24	All ordered together for NZD59.915 million (USD33.5 million) in 2026. These are expected to replace some of the ageing vehicles in the fleet.
Ford Tourneo Sport		(United States) USA	Minibus	36	All ordered together for NZD59.915 million (USD33.5 million) in 2026. These are expected to replace some of the ageing vehicles in the fleet.
Staff vehicles
Hyundai Ioniq		South Korea	Electric staff vehicle	—	In efforts to reduce its carbon footprint, the army is trialing the electric Hyundai Ioniq, in addition to installing electric vehicle charging stations at Trentham Military Camp.
Electric utility motorcycles		—	Electric utility motorcycles	—	UBCO electric bikes are currently being trialed by Battle Lab for the purposes of reconnaissance and surveillance, airfield security and other transport roles.

== See also ==
- List of individual weapons of the New Zealand armed forces
- Tanks of New Zealand
- Uniforms of the New Zealand Army
- List of former equipment of the New Zealand Army
