= Operation Tīeke =

Operation Tīeke is the operational name given by the New Zealand Defence Force to its military operation to train and support the Armed Forces of Ukraine, through training and logistical support in the United Kingdom and continental Europe. It began as part of New Zealand's contribution to the British-led Operation Interflex, and progressively expanded to include logistic and liaison roles in Germany and Beligum as part of the NATO Security Assistance and Training for Ukraine command, as well as operations in Poland, Denmark and Norway as part of Operation Legio.

Its name is derived from the tīeke, or saddleback: a native New Zealand bird. Described as New Zealand's commitment to upholding the rules-based international order, it is the countries current largest overseas deployment. The operation began in 2022, and is ongoing as of 2026.

== History ==
On 28 March 2022, nine NZDF intelligence analysts were dispatched to Belgium and the United Kingdom to assist intelligence gathering operations related to Ukraine. Further mentioned was the use of open source intelligence capabilities, and the supply of communications equipment from Tait Communications to Ukraine. On 28 June 2022, it was announced that another six intelligence analysts were to be sent to the UK to "support partner intelligence requirements".

On 23 May 2022, Prime Minister Jacinda Ardern announced that up to 30 personnel of the Royal Regiment of New Zealand Artillery would be sent to the United Kingdom to assist in training Ukrainian forces on the L119 light gun.

In May 2023, Prime Minister Chris Hipkins announced that the mandate for Operation Tīeke had been extended through to 30 June 2024, with the deployment of up to 95 NZDF personnel. Minister of Defence Andrew Little stated that 440 personnel had been deployed since 2022.

In February 2024, the government extended the mission to June 2025, allowing for up to 97 personnel to conduct specialised training. By then the NZDF had trained more than 2,700 infantry recruits, and over 500 NZDF personnel had been deployed at since 2022.

By May 2024, the NZDF had trained more than 3,100 recruits, with Major Matt Blake stating that the training had "prepared Ukrainian soldiers for the realities of war". Brigadier Matt Weston, emphasised that the mission showed New Zealand's commitment to the so-called rules-based international order.

Christopher Luxon and Kier Starmer inspect a SYOS Aerospace UAV intended for Ukraine, April 2025

On 22 April 2025, Prime Minister Christopher Luxon announced that military assistance would be extended until December 2026 with the deployment of up to 100 personnel. To date the operation had trained more than 53,000 Ukrainian personnel. Training continued in combat casualty care, engineering, leadership and explosive ordnance disposal. The announcement brought total New Zealand support to $152 million NZD. After a visit by Prime Minister Christopher Luxon with British Prime Minister Kier Starmer, it was announced that a contract for unmanned aerial vehicles intended for Ukraine had been awarded to SYOS Aerospace, a joint UK-New Zealand company based in Mount Maunganui.

In December 2025, Commander Joint Forces New Zealand Robert Krushka stated that Ukraine's needs had involved, and so had the training support provided by New Zealand. Specialist training for the Armed Forces of Ukraine was further expanded to include the deployment of a detachment of the Corps of Royal New Zealand Engineers alongside the Polish Armed Forces, as well as training provided by the Royal New Zealand Navy in sub-surface explosive ordnance handling. To date, more than 930 NZDF personnel had been deployed, with 75 personnel deployed more than once.

Meeting of the Coalition of the Willing, February 2026

On 21 May 2026, Minister of Defence Chris Penk announced that the country had joined the Norwegian led Operation Legio based in Poland. While operations had previously mainly taken place in the United Kingdom, Ukraine had requested the training take place closer to its borders.

On 8 September 2026, Minister of Defence Paul Goldsmith and Minister of Foreign Affairs Winston Peters announced that the mandate for Operation Tīeke had been extended until 30 June 2028. Up to 70 personnel would be deployed in Europe, with the majority engaged in training the Armed Forces of Ukraine as part of Operation Legio in Poland. The Norwegian led operation is based in the newly constructed Camp Jomsborg, located close to the border with Ukraine. NZDF training would prioritise training in specialist fields such as electronic warfare and drone operations. Peters remarked that "The defence of Ukraine has significant implications not only for the security of Europe, but also for the Indo-Pacific."

== Structure ==
Ukrainian forces training under NZDF supervision primarily consist of forcefully mobilised conscripts between the age of 25 and 60 years old, with little to no prior military experience. Training is conducted at an accelerated schedule, with typical formal aspects of military life such as regimental activities and parade drill are removed, resulting in a period of seven weeks between troops arriving by bus to being placed on the front line.

- Basic recruit training: Weapon handling, range shooting, field medicine, explosives, counter-drone and CBRN skills. This is the first experience of many conscripts in handling weapons.
- Medical training: Trainees are taught to address bleeding and blast injuries, involving through the use of tourniquets, chest seals and hypothermia management. Evacuation techniques such as drags and carries are also covered.
- Explosives: A week of training on explosives is conducted with a team of New Zealand Army engineers.
- Drone warfare: Training in evasion and counter-drone warfare, with instructors equipped with commercial-grade quadcopters equipped with water balloons.

== Political support ==
Operation Tīeke was seen near unanimous support from most mainstream parties in the New Zealand.

The involvement of New Zealand forces in providing support for the Russo-Ukrainian war has been opposed by Te Pāti Māori, accusing the country of being "puppets for America", and have pushed for the country to adopt a neutral geopolitical stance. In 2022, co-leader Debbie Ngarewa-Packer emphasised that the parties focus was on domestic policies, and was not a supporter of "being part of wars for other nations." The position of the party is not purely one of non-involvement, supporting legislation allowing sanctions on Russia, and has expressed support for Ukrainian territorial integrity. In February 2023, the party codified this viewpoint into policy, announcing that its MPs would vote against the overseas deployment of New Zealand forces, and would express support for the withdrawal of New Zealand from the Five Eyes intelligence alliance.

== Recognition ==
=== New Zealand Special Service Medal (Support to Ukraine) ===
In March 2026, Minister of Defence Judith Collins announced that NZDF personnel who had been deployed to Europe and the United Kingdom with thirty days of qualifying service would be eligible for the New Zealand Special Service Medal (Support to Ukraine). Collins stated that as of March 2026, close to 1,000 personnel were eligible for the medal, carrying out work that she described as challenging and often emotionally confronting. The NZDF reported that the ribbon would be designed by the New Zealand Herald of Arms, with no clasps or bars. The ribbon is composed of seven stripes: white, blue, yellow, white, yellow, blue and white.

The special service medal recognises military service that does not meet the criteria of a campaign medal, and would not count towards qualification to the New Zealand Operational Service Medal. In the New Zealand Order of Wear, medals for special service are worn after war and campaign medals.

== Controversies ==
=== Unauthorised leave ===
Dominic Abelen, then a private in the 2/1st Battalion, RNZIR in 2013

In August 2022, Corporal Dominic Abelen, a soldier serving in the Royal New Zealand Infantry Regiment on leave without pay, was killed while fighting for Ukrainian forces during the Battle of Vuhledar. Abelen had no told the NZDF or his family of his plans, with the service emphasising that no personnel had been authorised to enter Ukraine. He had been attached to Ukraine's International Legion.

In response, the NZDF stated that it did not independently track the movements of personnel on leave without pay, instead relying on individuals to provide accurate information. It emphasised that under NZDF rules, members on leave without pay remain subject to Defence Force orders, who pay travel or take other employment, but approval is required to enter certain countries, including Ukraine. Following Abelen's death, 94 personnel on unpaid leave were contacted to verify their location, while acknowledging that it did not know how many soldiers might already be there. In September 2022, a review had identified that two Lance Corporals might have, or may have been previously. Neither had sought permission to travel.

Prime Minister Jacinda Ardern cautioned other New Zealanders against travelling to Ukraine. A former defence legal advisor clarified that travelling without authorisation and fighting for a foreign army was a major breach of rules, punishable by discharge and incarceration in a military prison. Former Defence Minister Ron Mark estimated that about 20 individuals were fighting as part of the International Legion, while Aaron Wood of the No Duff Charitable Trust estimated that the number could exceed 100.

=== Psychological support ===
On 2 March 2024, a heavily intoxicated Linton-based soldier in New Plymouth violently attacked a taxi driver, a passerby who tried to intervene, and two arresting police officers. The driver was seriously injured, needing repeated hospital and dental care. The soldier, identified as 26 year old Jack Wesley of the 1st Battalion, Royal New Zealand Infantry Regiment, was discharged from the New Zealand Defence Force, charged with assault, intent to injure, and assaulting a police officer, and was sentenced to nine months of home detention. Wesley stated that following his six-month deployment in 2023, he had been diagnosed with post-traumatic stress disorder, was haunted by the deaths of Ukrainians he had help to train, and had resorted to heavy drinking. The former soldier accused the NZDF of a lack of psychological support post-deployment.

Wesley described his role as aiding recruits in training in several roles, including combat first aid, marksmanship and offensive and defensive operations. Over his six months, Wesley and his team had trained approximately 800 troops in five week training courses of 200 people, largely made up of mobilised conscripts with little prior military experience, often described by the NZ unit as 'the kids' (With NZDF colleagues as 'the parents'). Despite official doctrine to not build a personal rapport with the Ukrainians, the unit was closely embedded with them over the five weeks, an maintained a group chat once they had deployed to the frontline. Wesley believed that most of the 800 Ukrainians were now dead. Wesley further described an incident at a firing range resulting in a near accident. However, the NZDF stated that it had no record of any close calls or accidents. It was reported that many of the team post-deployment found it difficult to reintegrate with life back in New Zealand post deployment, with many turning to alcohol. In this period, Wesley was involved in a brawl during a party, suffering a broken jaw and a concussion, returning to heavy drinking as a 'coping mechanism', consuming a box, or 12 bottles a day.

Wesley stated a lack of psychological support from the NZDF, stating that: "They [NZDF] tell us all the things that we need to know, we need to hear. But when it comes to actually supporting us, there's nothing really there until s**t hits the fan." Following his arrest, it was reported that further psychological help was being made available for the rest of his unit. The former soldier expressed a sense of comradery with his unit, but stated that he would never go back, and had received no further support from the NZDF since his termination.

As Operation Tīeke is not a considered an Operational Service, service personnel are not covered under the Veterans Support Act, and are not eligible for support from Veterans Affairs. Aaron Wood of the No Duff Charitable Trust, a veteran support charity stated that the case was "unfortunately a rinse, soak, repeat situation", where soldiers from the NZDF were being discharged without adequate support and help.

== See also ==
- Operation Interflex
