= List of former equipment of the New Zealand Army =

This article lists equipment, weapons and vehicles formerly used by the New Zealand Army.

== Infantry equipment ==
=== Uniforms ===
==== Camouflage patterns ====
Name	Origin	Image	Introduced	Withdrawn	Notes
ERDL	United States		1968	1980	
Tigerstripe	Republic of Vietnam				
DPM	United Kingdom		1980	1997	
NZDPM	New Zealand		1997	2013	
NZDDPM	New Zealand		2003	2013	
MultiCam	United States				
NZMCU	New Zealand		2013	2019	

== Small arms ==
=== Rifles and carbines ===
Name	Origin	Image	Model	Calibre	Introduced	Withdrawn	Notes
Paget’s Carbine	United Kingdom		Pattern 1827		1840		
Lovell’s Carbine	United Kingdom		Pattern 1844		1844		
Pattern 1853 Enfield	United Kingdom		Pattern 1853		1858	1885	
Pattern 1853 Enfield	United Kingdom		Pattern 1853 Carbine		1858	1885	
Pattern 1853 Enfield	United Kingdom		Pattern 1856		1858	1885	
Constabulary carbine	United Kingdom		Pattern 1840		1858		
Lancaster Royal Engineers carbine	United Kingdom		Pattern 1855		1858		
Westley-Richards carbine	United Kingdom		Monkey Tail		1861		
Terry	United Kingdom		Pattern 1861 Carbine		1861	1881	
Terry	United Kingdom		Pattern 1861		1863	1867	
Colt Model 1855 revolving carbine	United StatesUnited Kingdom		Model 1855		1864		
Hay Rifle	United Kingdom		Pattern 1858		1865	1885	
M1854 Sharps rifle	United States		M1854		1865		
Snider–Enfield	United Kingdom		Pattern 1866	.577 Snider	1868	1907	
Snider–Enfield	United Kingdom		Pattern 1867	.577 Snider	1868	1907	
Snider–Enfield	United Kingdom		Pattern 1872 Constabulary Carbine	.577 Snider	1872	1907	
Snider–Enfield	United Kingdom		Pattern 1869 Cavalry Carbine	.577 Snider	1875	1907	
Snider–Enfield	United Kingdom		Pattern 1869 Artillery Carbine	.577 Snider	1875	1907	
Snider–Enfield	United Kingdom		Pattern 1880 Yeomanry Carbine	.577 Snider	1880	1907	
Hay-Snider	United Kingdom		Pattern 1869	.577 Snider	1869	1907	
M1885 Remington–Lee	United States		M1885	.43 Spanish	1887	1888	
Martini-Henry	United Kingdom		Mk I	.577/450 Martini–Henry	1890	1903	
Martini-Henry	United Kingdom		MK I Artillery Carbine	.577/450 Martini–Henry	1890	1903	
Martini-Henry	United Kingdom		MK I Cavalry Carbine	.577/450 Martini–Henry	1890	1903	
Martini-Henry	United Kingdom		Mk II	.577/450 Martini–Henry	1890	1903	
Martini-Henry	United Kingdom		Mk III	.577/450 Martini–Henry	1890	1903	
Martini-Henry	United Kingdom		Mk IV	.577/450 Martini–Henry	1890	1903	
Martini–Enfield	United Kingdom		Mk I	.303 British	1898	1946	
Martini–Enfield	United Kingdom		Mk I Artillery Carbine	.303 British	1898	1946	
Magazine Lee-Metford	United Kingdom		Mk II	.303 British	1900	1945	
Magazine Lee-Metford	United Kingdom		Mk II*	.303 British	1900	1945	
Magazine Lee-Enfield	United Kingdom		Mk I	.303 British	1900	1945	
Magazine Lee-Enfield	United Kingdom		Mk I*	.303 British	1900	1945	
Magazine Lee-Enfield	United Kingdom		Mk I New Zealand Carbine	.303 British	1901	1903	
Magazine Lee-Enfield	United Kingdom		Mk I Cadet Rifle	.22 Long Rifle	1914		
Martini Cadet rifle	United Kingdom			.310 Cadet	1902	1911	
Short Magazine Lee-Enfield	United Kingdom		Mk I	.303 British	1905		
Short Magazine Lee-Enfield	United Kingdom		Mk I*	.303 British	1905		
Short Magazine Lee-Enfield	United Kingdom		Mk I***	.303 British	1905		
Short Magazine Lee-Enfield	United Kingdom		Mk I .22	.22 Long Rifle	1913	1925	
Short Magazine Lee-Enfield	United Kingdom		No. 1 Mk III	.303 British	1909	1955	
Short Magazine Lee-Enfield	United Kingdom		No. 1 Mk III*	.303 British	1909	1955	
Short Magazine Lee-Enfield	United Kingdom		No. 2 Mk IV*	.22 Long Rifle	1924	1945	
Short Magazine Lee-Enfield	United Kingdom		No. 4 Mk I	.303 British	1942	2009	
Short Magazine Lee-Enfield	United Kingdom		No. 4 Mk I*	.303 British	1942	2009	
Short Magazine Lee-Enfield	United Kingdom		No. 4 Mk II	.303 British	1942	2009	
Short Magazine Lee-Enfield	United Kingdom		No. 8 Mk I	.22 Long Rifle	1952	2009	
Short Magazine Lee-Enfield	United Kingdom		No. 5 Jungle Carbine	.303 British	1955		
M1904 Winchester Training rifle	United States		M1904	.22 Long Rifle	1910	1945	
Birmingham Small Arms Air rifle	United Kingdom		Model D		1911	1918	
Pattern 1914 Enfield	United KingdomUnited States		No. 3 Mk I	.303 British	1916	1960	
Pattern 1914 Enfield	United KingdomUnited States		No. 3 Mk I*	.303 British	1916	1960	
Pattern 1914 Enfield	United KingdomUnited States		No. 3 Mk I*(T)	.303 British	1918	1960	
Ross rifle	Canada		Mk III	.303 British	1916	1970	
Ross rifle	Canada		MK IIIB	.303 British	1916	1970	
Browning 22 Semi-Auto	United States			.22 Long Rifle			
Winchester Model 1895	United States		M1895	.303 British			
M1903 Springfield	United States		M1903	.30-06 Springfield	1942	1960	
M1 carbine	United States		M1	.30 Carbine	1943		
L1A1 Self-Loading Rifle	United Kingdom		L1A1	7.62x51mm NATO	1960	1990	
M16 rifle	United States		M16A1	5.56x45mm NATO			
Parker-Hale M82 sniper rifle	United Kingdom			7.62x51mm NATO			
Accuracy International Arctic Warfare sniper rifle	United Kingdom						
Steyr AUG	AustriaAustralia			5.56×45mm NATO	1988	2017	
Accuracy International AW50 precision rifle	United Kingdom						

=== Pistols and revolvers ===
- (British Empire) Webley Revolver
- (British Empire) Enfield No. 2
- (United States) Smith & Wesson Model 10
- (United States) M1911 pistol
- (United States) (Belgium) Browning Hi-Power
- (Switzerland) (West Germany) SIG Sauer P226

=== Shotguns ===
- (United States) Remington Model 870
- (United States) Browning Auto-5

=== Submachine guns ===
Name	Origin	Image	Model	Calibre	Introduced	Withdrawn	Notes
M1928 Thompson	United States		M1928A1	.45 Automatic Colt Pistol	1940		
M1928 Thompson	United States		M1	.45 Automatic Colt Pistol	1943		
M1928 Thompson	United States		M1A1	.45 Automatic Colt Pistol	1943		
Sten	United Kingdom		Mk II	9×19mm Parabellum	1941		
Sten	United Kingdom		Mk III	9×19mm Parabellum	1943		
Owen	Australia			9×19mm Parabellum			
M3 submachine gun	United States		M3	.45 Automatic Colt Pistol	1944	1953	
M3 submachine gun	United States		M3A1	.45 Automatic Colt Pistol	1944	1953	
Lanchester	United Kingdom		Mk I*	9×19mm Parabellum	1949	1972	
L2A3 Sterling	United Kingdom		L2A3	9×19mm Parabellum	1959	1989	
L2A3 Sterling	United Kingdom		L34A1	9×19mm Parabellum		1989	

=== Machine guns ===
Name	Origin	Image	Model	Calibre	Introduced	Withdrawn	Notes
Maxim	United Kingdom			.577/450 Martini-Henry	1896	1901	
Maxim	United Kingdom			.303 British	1901	1916	
Lewis	United Kingdom		M1914 Lewis	.303 British	1915	1960	
Vickers	United Kingdom		Mk I	.303 British	1916	1973	
Vickers	United Kingdom		Mk I*	.303 British	1916	1920	
Vickers	United Kingdom		Mk IV	.303 British	1940	1942	
Vickers	United Kingdom		Mk VI	.303 British	1940	1942	
Vickers	United Kingdom		Mk VII	.303 British	1940	1942	
Vickers .50 machine gun	United Kingdom		Mk III Mk V	Vickers 12.7×81mm	1939	1945	
M1898 Hotchkiss	France		M1898 Hotchkiss	.303 British	1900	1900	
Pattern 1914 Hotchkiss	FranceUnited Kingdom		Pattern 1914 Mk I	.303 British	1916	1945	
Vickers Gas Operated (Vickers K)	United Kingdom			.303 British	1939	1960	
Bren LMG	United Kingdom		Mk I	.303 British	1939	1983	
Bren LMG	United Kingdom		Mk II	.303 British	1941	1983	
Bren LMG	United Kingdom		L4A4	7.62×51mm NATO	1973	1993	
15 mm Besa machine gun	United Kingdom		Mk I 15 mm	15x104mm Brno	1941	1942	
15 mm Besa machine gun	United Kingdom		Mk II 15 mm	15x104mm Brno	1941	1942	
15 mm Besa machine gun	United Kingdom		Mk III* 15 mm	15x104mm Brno	1941	1942	
Besa	United Kingdom		Mk I	7.92×57mm Mauser	1941	1963	
Besa	United Kingdom		Mk II	7.92×57mm Mauser	1941	1963	
Besa	United Kingdom		Mk III	7.92×57mm Mauser	1941	1963	
Charlton Automatic Rifle	New Zealand			.303 British	1942	1945	
M60 machine gun	United States			7.62×51mm NATO	1965		

== Artillery ==
Name	Origin	Image	Model	Introduced	Withdrawn	Notes
Ordnance QF 18-pounder	United Kingdom					
Ordnance QF 4.5-inch howitzer	United Kingdom					
Ordnance BL 6 inch 26cwt howitzer	United Kingdom			c. 1920s	1953	
Ordnance, QF 3.7-inch mountain howitzer	United Kingdom		Mk I	1922	1952	
Ordnance QF 25-pounder	United Kingdom			1940	Withdrawn in 1977, still in ceremonial use	
Ordnance QF 6-pounder	United Kingdom			1942	c. 1960s	
Ordnance QF 17-Pounder	United Kingdom			1943	1958	
Ordnance BL 5.5-inch medium gun	United Kingdom				c. 1980s	
OTO Melara Mod 56	Italy		L5	1963	c. 1980s	24 purchased in 1963.
Mistral	France			1997	2012	12 launchers and 24 missiles purchased in 1997. Never fully brought into service.

== Vehicles ==
=== Tanks ===
Name	Origin	Image	Model	Introduced	Withdrawn	Notes
A7V	German Empire			1918	1919	Single German tank captured by the New Zealand Division
Bob Semple tank	New Zealand			1940	1942	three improvised vehicles built on tractor chassis
Schofield tank	New Zealand			1940	1943	Wheel-cum-track vehicle. Did not enter production or service.
Tank Light Mk VI, Vickers	United Kingdom		Mk II Mk III Mk VI B	1940	1941	
Tank Infantry Mark II, Matilda	United Kingdom		Mk IV CS A 12	1942	1944	
Tank Infantry Mk III, Valentine	United Kingdom		Mk II Mk III Mk V	1941	1960	
Tank, Cruiser, Mk V, Covenanter	United Kingdom		Bridgelayer	1942	c. 1950s	
M3 Stuart	United States		M3 M3A1 M3A3	1941	1970	
M4 Sherman	United States		IB, IC, III, VC	1943	1945	
Sherman Firefly	United Kingdom			1944	1945	Conversion of US supplied Sherman tanks with British 17 pdr gun.
M10 Tank Destroyer	United States			1944	1945	
Centurion	United Kingdom		Mk III Mk V	1953	1968	
M41 Walker Bulldog	United States		M41A1	1960	1982	

=== Reconnaissance vehicles ===
Name	Origin	Image	Model	Introduced	Withdrawn	Notes
Car Light Reconnaissance, Canadian GM (R.A.C.), Otter	Canada		Mk II	1941	1944	
M3 White Scout Car	United States		M3A1	1941	1945	
Daimer Dingo	United Kingdom		Mk II	1942	1962	
Daimler Ferret	United Kingdom		Mk I Mk II	1956	1982	
FV101 Scorpion	United Kingdom			1982	1998	Armoured reconnaissance vehicle/fire support variant of CVR(T) family. Most were sold off to a British arms dealer in 2000.

=== Armoured vehicles ===
Name	Origin	Image	Model	Introduced	Withdrawn	Notes
Universal Carrier	United KingdomNew Zealand		No. 1 No. 2 No. 3	1939	1958	
Armoured Car, Marmon-Herrington	South Africa		Mk II Mk III	1941	1941	
Armoured Car, Humber	United Kingdom		Mk II Mk III	1941	1942	
Car Armoured Light Standard, Beaverette	United KingdomNew Zealand		Beaverette NZLP	1942	1945	
Staghound armoured car	United States			1943	1944	Used in Italian Campaign
Armoured Carrier, Wheeled, New Zealand Pattern	New Zealand			1943	1957	
Armoured Car, Daimler	United Kingdom		Mk II	1953	1960	
M113 Armored Personnel Carrier	United States		M113A1	1970	2005	The fleet of 48 vehicles sold for scrap in 2006.

=== Utility and transport vehicles ===
Name	Origin	Image	Model	Introduced	Withdrawn	Notes
Land Rover Series I	United Kingdom		Series I 80"	1951		
Bedford RL	United KingdomNew Zealand			1958	1989	Built under licence in New Zealand.
Land Rover Series II	United Kingdom		Series II 109"	1959		
Land Rover Series II	United Kingdom		Series IIA 88"	1965		
Land Rover Series II	United Kingdom		Series IIA 109"	1965		
Land Rover 101 Forward Control	United Kingdom		Series IIB 110" WB Forward Control	1967		
Land Rover Series III Stage One	United Kingdom		Series III 109" V8	1982		
High Mobility Multipurpose Wheeled Vehicle	United States					Borrowed U.S. vehicles in Afghanistan were used by the New Zealand Special Air Service.

== See also ==
- List of individual weapons of the New Zealand Defence Force
