= SYOS Aerospace =

SYOS Aerospace is an aerospace company based in Tauranga, New Zealand. As of November 2025 the company has 150 staff members, of which 60% are engineers.

== History ==
SYOS Aerospace was founded in 2021.

In April 2025 Keir Starmer, Prime Minister of the United Kingdom, announced that SYOS Aerospace would supply the United Kingdom with uncrewed military vehicles, to be used in Ukraine as part of the Russo-Ukrainian war. SYOS has a factory in Fareham, Hampshire, England. The deal was worth NZ$67 million.

In November 2025 the chief executive, Sam Vye, said that in the future SYOS would manufacture drones Australia.

== Products ==
SYOS Aerospace makes several different types of uncrewed aircraft. Its flagship vehicle is the uncrewed SA200 helicopter, able to lift a payload weighing up to 200 kilograms (440 lb) and fly for up to 2 hours. Other vehicles the company makes are SM300 USV uncrewed boats, SG400 UGV ground vehicles and the SA5 UAS drones that look like small aeroplanes.
