= List of individual weapons of the New Zealand Defence Force =

The following are lists of individual weapons used by the New Zealand Defence Force.

== Assault rifles, sniper rifles ==
Currently In service

Name	Origin	Type	Calibre	image	Details
Lewis Machine and Tool MARS-L	United States	Assault rifle	5.56×45mm NATO		Adopted in 2015 to replace the Steyr AUG as the standard service rifle of the New Zealand Army. This weapon comes in 2 different barrel lengths and can take many modular attachments hence the name given by the NZDF to this rifle the Modular Assault Rifle System - Light (this is the same with LMT's own MARS-L, but is referred as the Modular Ambidextrous Rifle System - Light instead for its US civilian models). The rifle is generally equipped with the Trijicon ACOG scope with an RMR red dot mounted on top. Most recent design upgrade with enhanced features based on the AR-15/M4/M-16 family of firearms. Equipped with M7 bayonet.
Lewis Machine and Tool 308 MWS	United States	Designated marksman rifle, Sniper rifle	7.62x51mm NATO		The New Zealand Army adopted the rifle in October 2011. It differs from its UK counterpart in the use of a Leupold adjustable 4.5-14× scope, canted iron sights and a foldable foregrip.
Barrett MRAD	United States	Bolt action sniper rifle	7.62x51mm NATO.338 Lapua Magnum		Introduced in 2018 to replace the Accuracy International Arctic Warfare 7.62×51mm bolt action sniper rifle. Equipped with an ATACR 5-25×56 F1 Nightforce scope. Dual calibre configuration with 7.62×51mm NATO for training and .338 Lapua Magnum for operations.
Barrett M107A1	United States	Anti-materiel sniper rifle	12.7×99mm NATO		A semi-automatic sniper and anti-materiel rifle chambered in .50 BMG.
M4 carbine	United States	Assault rifle, Carbine	5.56×45mm NATO		Used by New Zealand Special Air Service.

Retired

Name	Origin	Type	Calibre	Image	Details
Steyr AUG F88 Austeyr	Austria Australia	Bullpup assault rifle	5.56×45mm NATO		It was available in three barrel lengths: 350 mm, 407 mm, and 508 mm. Replaced by LMT Mars L.
Accuracy International Arctic Warfare	United Kingdom	Bolt action sniper rifle	7.62x51mm NATO		Retired Sniper Rifle Replaced By Barrett MRAD
Accuracy International AW50F	United Kingdom	Anti-materiel sniper rifle	12.7×99mm NATO		
M16A1	United States	Assault rifle	5.56×45mm NATO		
L1A1 Self-Loading Rifle	United Kingdom Australia	Battle rifle	7.62x51mm NATO		
Parker Hale M82	United Kingdom	Bolt action sniper rifle	7.62x51mm NATO		
Rifle .22 No 8 Mk I	United Kingdom	Bolt-action cadet rifle	.22LR		
Boys anti-tank rifle	United Kingdom	Anti-tank rifle	.55 Boys		
Lee–Enfield: New Zealand Carbine; No. 1 Mk III; No. 4 Mk I; No. 4 MK II	British Empire	Bolt action service rifle	.303 British		Still used for commemorative purposes.
Ross Mk III	Canada	Bolt action service rifle	.303 British		
Pattern 1914 Enfield	British Empire	Bolt action service rifle	.303 British		
Lee-Metford: Mk I; Mk I*; Mk II	British Empire	Bolt action service rifle	.303 British		
Martini-Henry and carbine variants Martini-Enfield	British Empire	Breech-loading single-shot lever-actuated rifle	.577/450 Martini–Henry.303 British		Carbine still used by Queen Alexandra's Mounted Rifles Colour Guard
M1885 Remington–Lee	United States	Bolt action service rifle	.43 Spanish		Introduced 1887, Withdrawn 1888
Snider–Enfield	British Empire	Breech-loading rifle	.577 Snider		
1858 Hay Medium Enfield Rifle	British Empire	Breech-loading rifle	.577		Introduced 1860

== Sidearms ==
In service

Name	Origin	Type	Calibre	Image	Details
Glock 17	Austria	Semi-automatic pistol	9x19mm Parabellum		Gen. 4

Retired

Name	Origin	Type	Calibre	Image	Details
SIG Sauer P226	Switzerland Germany	Semi-automatic pistol	9x19mm Parabellum		
FN Browning Hi-Power No. 2 Mk I	United States Belgium	Semi-automatic pistol	9x19mm Parabellum		
M1911	United States	Semi-automatic pistol	.45 ACP		
Smith & Wesson Model 10	United States	Revolver	.38 S&W		Victory Model
Enfield No. 2	British Empire	Revolver	.38 S&W		
Webley Revolver: Mk I; Mk VI	British Empire	Revolver	.442 Webley.455 Webley		

== Shotguns ==
In service

Name	Origin	Type	Calibre	Image	Details
Benelli M3	Italy	Hybrid pump-action and semi-automatic shotgun	12-gauge		

Retired

Name	Origin	Type	Calibre	Image	Details
Browning Auto-5	United States	semi-automatic shotgun			
Remington Model 870	United States	pump-action shotgun			

== Submachine guns ==
In service

Name	Origin	Calibre	Image	Details
Heckler & Koch MP5	West Germany	9×19mm Parabellum		Used by the New Zealand Special Air Service.

Retired

Name	Origin	Calibre	Image	Details
Sterling L2A1 & L2A3	United Kingdom	9×19mm Parabellum		
Sterling L34A1	United Kingdom	9×19mm Parabellum		
Owen gun	Australia	9×19mm Parabellum		
Sten: Mk 2; Mk 5	United Kingdom	9×19mm Parabellum		
Thompson: M1928; M1928A1	United States	.45 ACP		
Lanchester	United Kingdom	9×19mm Parabellum		

== Machine guns ==
In service

Name	Origin	Type	Calibre	Image	Details
FN MAG (MAG 58)	Belgium	General-purpose machine gun	7.62x51mm NATO		
FN Minimi	Belgium	Light machine gun	7.62x51mm NATO		
M2 Browning	United States	Heavy machine gun	12.7×99mm NATO		

Retired

Name	Origin	Type	Calibre	Image	Details
C9 Minimi C9 5.56mm	Canada	light machine gun	5.56×45mm NATO		
L43A1	United Kingdom	Ranging machine gun	7.62x51mm NATO		Used as a ranging gun on the FV101 Scorpion
L7	United Kingdom	General-purpose machine gun	7.62x51mm NATO		
M60	United States	General-purpose machine gun	7.62x51mm NATO		
L2A1	Australia Canada	light machine gun	7.62x51mm NATO		
L4A3	United Kingdom	light machine gun	7.62x51mm NATO		
M1919 Browning: L3A3; L3A3E1; L3A4	United States	Medium machine gun	.30-06 Springfield		
Bren gun	British Empire	light machine gun	.303 British		
Charlton Automatic Rifle	New Zealand	light machine gun	.303 British		
Hotchkiss M1909 Benét–Mercié	France British Empire	light machine gun	.303 British		
Lewis gun	British Empire	light machine gun	.303 British		
Besa machine gun	British Empire	Tank-mounted medium machine gun	7.92mm		
Vickers gun	British Empire	Medium machine gun	.303 British		

== Grenade launchers ==
Current

Name	Origin	Type	Calibre	Details
RM M203PI	United States	Under-barrel grenade launcher	40mm grenade	Used on Steyr AUG and LMT MARS-L rifles
Heckler & Koch GMG	Germany	Automatic grenade launcher	40mm grenade	

Retired

Name	Origin	Type	Calibre	Details
M203	United States	Under-barrel grenade launcher	40mm grenade	Used on M16A1 rifles
M79	United States	Handheld grenade launcher	40mm grenade	

== Mortar ==
Current

Name	Origin	Calibre	Details
M6C-640T	Austria	60mm mortar	
L16A2	United Kingdom	81mm mortar	

Retired

Name	Origin	Calibre	Details
Ordnance SBML two-inch mortar	British Empire	2 inch (50.8 mm) mortar	
Ordnance ML 4.2 inch Mortar	British Empire	4.2 inch (110 mm) mortar	
Stokes 3" Mortar	British Empire	3.2 in (81 mm)	
Ordnance ML 3 inch mortar	British Empire	3.19 in (81.0 mm)	
M2 Mortar	United States	60 mm (2.36 in)	

== Anti-armour ==
Current

Name	Origin	Type	Calibre	Details
FGM-148 Javelin	United States	Anti-tank guided missile	127 mm	
SRAAW M72	United States	Anti-tank rocket launcher	66 mm	
Carl Gustaf M3	Sweden	Recoilless rifle	84 mm	

Retired

Name	Origin	Type	Calibre	Details
Carl Gustaf L14A1	Sweden	Recoilless rifle	84 mm	
M40 106-mm recoilless rifle	United States	Recoilless rifle	105 mm	
BAT L1	British EmpireAustralia	Recoilless rifle	120 mm	
BAT L4 MORBAT	British EmpireAustralia	Recoilless rifle	120 mm	
BAT L6 WOMBAT	British EmpireAustralia	Recoilless rifle	120 mm	
Anti-Tank Grenade No 94 Energra	LiechtensteinBelgium	Anti-tank rifle grenade	75 mm	
M20 Mk II "Super Bazooka"	United States	Anti-tank rocket launcher	3.5 inch	
Projector, Infantry, Anti Tank (PIAT)	British Empire	Anti-tank grenade launcher		

== Anti-personnel ==
Current

Name	Origin	Type	Details
M18A1 Claymore	United StatesSouth Korea	Anti-personnel mine	
M67 Fragmentation hand grenade	United States	Fragmentation grenade	

Retired

Name	Origin	Type	Details
Mills bomb N°36	British Empire	Fragmentation grenade	
Grenade, hand, No 69 Mk I	British Empire	Fragmentation grenade	
No.68 Rifle Grenade	British Empire	Anti Tank grenade	
No.74 Sticky Bomb	British Empire	Anti Tank grenade	
No.75 Hawkins	British Empire	Anti Tank grenade	
No.63 rifle smoke grenade	British Empire	Smoke grenade	
