= JCB HMEE =

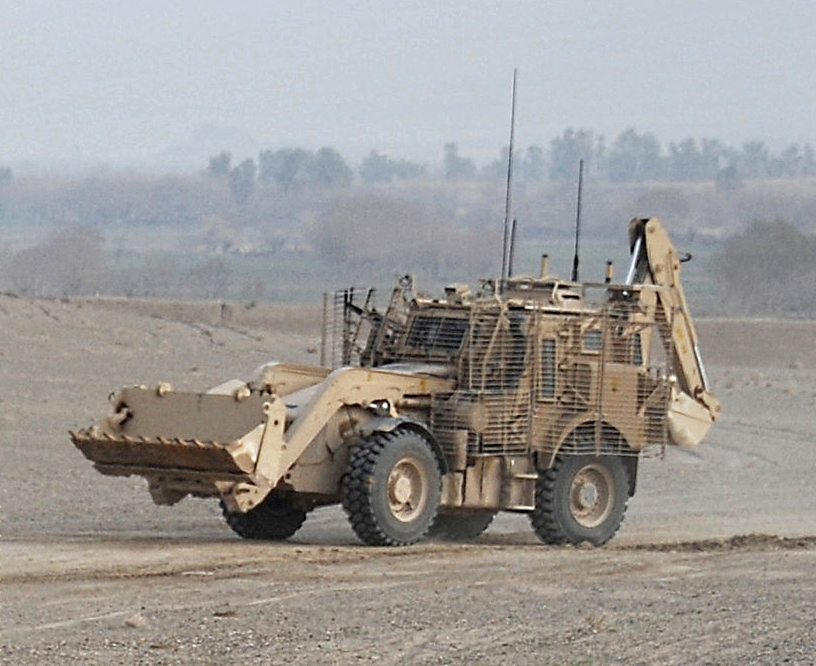
- HMEE with slat armor
- Type: Backhoe loader
- Place of origin: United Kingdom; United States

Service history
- Used by: Australia, Belgium, Denmark, Germany, Ireland, Israel, New Zealand, Spain, Sweden, Ukraine, United Kingdom, United States
- Wars: War in Afghanistan; Russian invasion of Ukraine

Production history
- Manufacturer: JCB
- Produced: 2007–present
- No. built: >900 (as of 2020)

Specifications
- Mass: A-kit: 14,125 kg (31,140 lb); B-kit: 15,959 kg (35,184 lb); C-kit: 16,180 kg (35,670 lb)
- Length: 9.45 to 10.10 m (372 to 398 in); 6x6: 6.9 m (270 in)
- Width: 2.44 m (96 in) (shovel); 2.95 m (116 in) (with armour)
- Height: 3.89 m (153 in) (driving); 2.67 m (105 in) (for transport)
- Crew: 1 or 2
- Armor: A-kit: standard unprotected; B-kit: applique and transparent armour; C-kit (Theatre Entry Standard): blast mitigation belly plate, internal spall liner, slat armour, capacity for electronic counter-measures and situational awareness.
- Engine: Cummins 6.7 QSB; 149 kW (203 PS); 705 N⋅m (520 lb⋅ft)
- Transmission: ZF Ergopower transmission (6 gears forward, 2 backwards)
- Ground clearance: 0.4 m (16 in)
- Operational range: 650 km (400 mi); 180 L (48 US gal) of fuel
- Maximum speed: A-kit: 96 km/h (60 mph); C-kit: 65 km/h (40 mph)

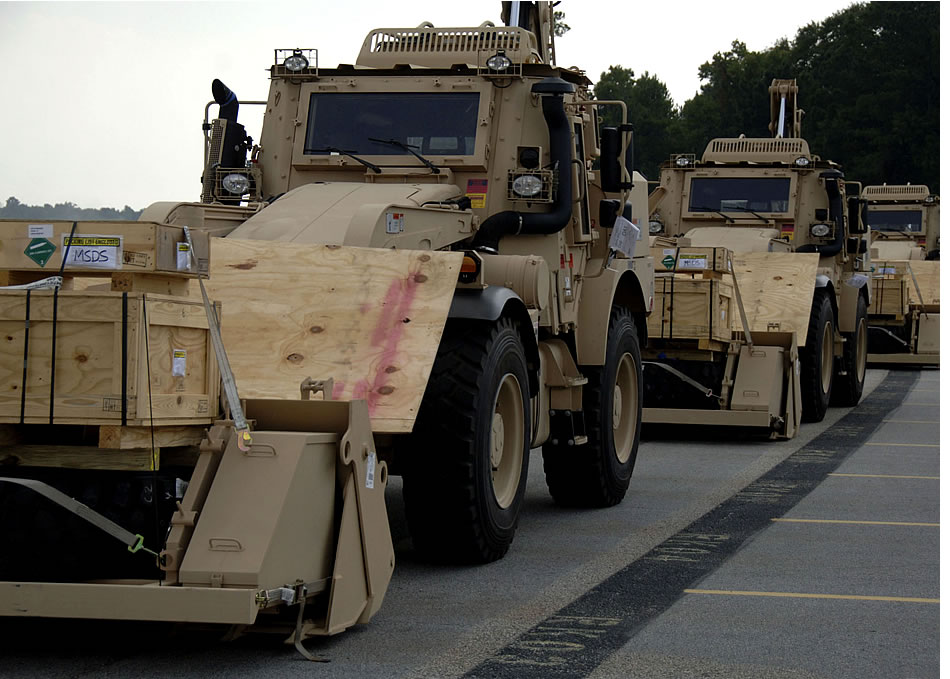
HMEE, prepared for shipping

The JCB HMEE (High Mobility Engineer Excavator) is a military engineering vehicle made by JCB.

== Design ==
The HMEE is an armoured backhoe loader designed for high speeds in order to self-deploy with military convoys. Most backhoes are limited to much lower speeds. It is also capable of towing heavy loads and has good off-road mobility. It is based on technology from the JCB Fastrac tractors.

The programme started in 2003. JCB used technologies of the JCB 4CX backhoe Loader and the Fastrac tractors to develop this system.

The HMEE is built at JCB's plant in Pooler, Georgia, integrating armour made by American Defense Systems (ASDI).

== Users ==
=== Current operators ===
Australia (10)
Ordered in two batches, 6, which were delivered by 2012. A further order for four machines took place in 2017.
Belgium (4)
As part of the programme ACEV (Armoured Combat Engineer Vehicle), JCB won a contract of €5 million to supply 4 HMEE in December 2020.
Denmark (6)
6 machines received in March 2020.
Germany (1)
7 were purchased in 2013.
6 were donated to Ukraine as aid in its war against the Russian Invasion.
Ireland (1)
1 purchased, and used for the UNIFIL mission of the Army.
Israel (unknown quantity)
New Zealand (6)
The Army received 6 vehicles in 2011.
Spain (10 in service, 42 on order)
The Spanish Army received a first batch of 2 HMEE with the armour B-kit, in July 2018, after an order in 2017. In 2024, two batches of 4 HMEE were delivered as a part of an order of 50 of these machines placed in 2023.
Sweden (10)
The FMV ordered 10 HMEE in 2008, for an entry in service in 2012.
Ukraine (6)
6 donated by Germany.
United Arab Emirates (unknown)
Unknown quantity.
United Kingdom (17)
The British Army placed an order for 4 HMEE in 2008 for its use in Afghanistan (£7 million).
13 vehicles ordered by the British Army in 2010.
United States (around 1,600)
In 2005, JCB was selected to produce what at the time was estimated to be 636 machines for $209 million. Firm orders:
- 2008: $229 million for 800 HMEE, as the first production contract.
- June 2014: second production order, with a contract valued at $50 million (unknown quantity).
- September 2017: 98 ($36.3 million)
- September 2018: contract extension for 180 more HMEE
- July 2020: 400 HMEE for the US Armed Forces ($269 million), delivery over 8 years.
