= Lewis Machine & Tool Company =

American firearms manufacturer

- Type: Private
- Industry: Arms
- Founded: 1980
- Headquarters: Eldridge, Iowa, U.S.
- Products: Firearms
- Website: lmtdefense.com

Lewis Machine & Tool Company (LMT), also known as LMT Defense, is an American armaments company founded by Karl R. Lewis, in 1980. It manufactures weapon systems, including a variant of the M4 carbine and the M203 grenade launcher. Its products are used by the military forces of the United Kingdom, New Zealand, Estonia, Switzerland, Lebanon and the United States. It formerly produced forged FN FAL receivers for Illinois-based DS Arms. The company founder has several arms related inventions assigned to him.

== History ==
LMT was established by Karl Lewis in 1980 from Milan, Illinois in order to manufacture firearm components. In 1986, LMT began to manufacture small arms for overseas sale.

== Products ==
=== Bolt and bolt carrier groups ===
A patented AR-15-pattern is produced with a bolt design featuring a redesigned extractor intended to improve the extraction of cartridges under adverse conditions. The company also produces a redesigned bolt carrier intended to improve the reliable performance of the rifle's “internal piston” system by obtaining a similar timing sequence with 14.5-inch carbine-length barrels compared to 20-inch rifle-length barrels for AR-15-pattern arms.

=== LM308MWS and CQB MRP Defender ===
The Monolithic Rail Platform (MRP) was created by the company, a one-piece, Picatinny-topped AR-15-pattern upper receiver made from a forged aluminum block. The MRP upper receiver has a quick-change barrel system. Its top rail position matches with the M4 carbine and KAC SR-15/SR-16 E3, for optical and sights compatibility.

In late 2009, LMT introduced the .308 Modular Weapon System LM308MWS, which uses the 7.62×51mm NATO round.

In February 2012, the British Transport Police began to use AR-pattern short-barreled rifles produced by LMT.
