= Leon Kristopher Smith =

New Zealand soldier (1978–2011)

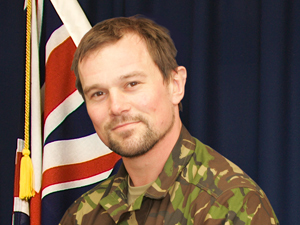
- Lance Corporal Leon Smith
- Born: 24 July 1978; Wellington, New Zealand
- Died: 28 September 2011 (aged 33); Maidan Wardak Province, Afghanistan
- Burial place: Whenua Tapu Cemetery
- Military career
- Allegiance: New Zealand
- Branch: Royal New Zealand Navy (1997–99); New Zealand Army (2005–11)
- Service years: 1997–99; 2005–11
- Rank: Ensign; Lance Corporal
- Service number: T1002840
- Unit: New Zealand Special Air Service
- Conflicts: War in Afghanistan
- Awards: New Zealand Gallantry Decoration

Leon Kristopher Smith, NZGD (24 July 1978 – 28 September 2011) was a New Zealand Army soldier who was posthumously awarded the New Zealand Gallantry Decoration and the Charles Upham Bravery Award for his actions when attempting to resuscitate a mortally wounded colleague, while responding to an insurgent attack on the British Council Offices in Kabul, Afghanistan in 2011. Smith, who was a member of the New Zealand Special Air Service, was himself mortally wounded during a later operation in Afghanistan.

== Background ==
Smith was born on 24 July 1978 and grew up in Wellington, New Zealand, before moving to Auckland with his work. He enlisted into the Royal New Zealand Navy on 14 January 1997 and was allocated the service number T1002840. Smith served with the Royal New Zealand Navy as a commissioned officer and was subsequently released in the rank of ensign on 12 January 1999.

Between 2000 and 2004 Smith worked in various roles for the Malaghan Institute. He also worked for NZ Post as a postie in Khandallah (Wellington) from 2003 leaving in late 2006 for the New Zealand Special Air Service (NZSAS) selection course.

== Army career ==
Smith enlisted into the Territorial Force of the New Zealand Army on 19 August 2005 as a rifleman, and qualified on the NZSAS selection course in 2006. After completing further training he was accepted and 'badged' into the NZSAS on 8 September 2008 as a fully qualified SAS Operator, he had recently returned after conducting training in the United Kingdom with other international special forces and had received additional training in advanced patrol paramedic techniques. Smith was operationally experienced having first served in Afghanistan in 2010, and spent almost 11 out of the previous 24 months before his death on operations. He was promoted to the substantive rank of lance corporal on 28 January 2011.

=== Attack on British Council Offices ===
On 19 August 2011 the British Council Offices in Kabul were attacked by insurgents, resulting in a number of diplomatic staff being trapped inside a 'safe room'. The Afghani Crisis Response Unit (CRU), accompanied by five NZSAS 'mentors', initially attempted to assault the compound via the main gate in an attempt to regain control of the compound. However, they were forced back by the insurgent fire and were forced to find another way in.

During the preparation phase of a plan to assist the CRU in clearing the compound, NZSAS trooper Corporal Douglas Grant was mortally wounded by insurgent fire. Initially, it was unclear where Grant had fallen, so Smith "with no concern for his personal safety", and despite receiving a significant volume of insurgent machine gun and rifle fire, moved into a position to enable him to confirm Corporal Grant's exact location. After being ordered to wait to receive a ballistic shield, Smith leapt over a wall and moved across exposed and open ground to the position where Corporal Grant had been shot. He then commenced treating Grant using his additional advanced medical skills until he could be evacuated from the compound.

Smith then returned to the fight operating with the other NZSAS personnel to blow a hole in a rear wall, allowing the CRU to storm the compound from a neighbouring building and rescue the hostages.

=== Wardak operation ===
On 28 September 2011, the NZSAS were mentoring the Afghani Crisis Response Unit on a high risk arrest operation in Wardak Province, located approximately 35 kilometres south-west of Kabul in order to disrupt an insurgent operation targeting Kabul. The operation was planned over several days, before time sensitive reporting indicating that a suspected suicide bomber, weapons and suicide vests were located within a compound was received. Smith was assisting with establishing a cordon around the compound, when he climbed a ladder to enable him to observe the compound. At this point an exchange of gun-fire occurred with an insurgent in the compound and he suffered a gunshot wound to the head. Smith was extracted by helicopter to a nearby United States base but did not survive his injuries.

=== Repatriation and funeral ===
Smith's colleagues conducted a ramp ceremony in Afghanistan, which included a fierce haka, before his body was carried onto a Boeing C-17 Globemaster III of the Royal Australian Air Force, before being transferred to a flight back to New Zealand. The NZSAS held a funeral service for Smith at Papakura Military Camp on 6 October 2011, which was attended by approximately 300 people, including the Prime Minister of New Zealand, Governor-General of New Zealand and members of the military. A family funeral was held on 7 October 2011 at the St Johns Anglican Church, Johnsonville, Wellington before he was interred at the Whenua Tapu Cemetery, Porirua. Smith was single with no children and left behind his mother, grandmother and two brothers in Wellington and his father and grandparents in Tauranga.

== Honours and awards ==
In July 2012, Smith was posthumously awarded the Charles Upham Bravery Award for his actions when responding to the insurgent attack on the British Council Offices and the medical assistance he subsequently provided to Corporal Doug Grant, performing in the opinion of the Upham's trust, the most outstanding act of heroism during the two previous years.

In the Special Honours List of 20 April 2013, it was announced that Smith had also posthumously been awarded the New Zealand Gallantry Decoration for his act of gallantry.

On 2 April 2012 the family of Leon Smith were presented with the New Zealand Memorial Cross by the Prime Minister of New Zealand, in recognition "that it is not only the soldiers themselves that make sacrifices in the service of New Zealand, but also their families".

=== Medal ribbons ===
Smith's medal ribbons, as they would appear on the left breast of his uniform, are:

From left: The New Zealand Gallantry Decoration, the New Zealand Operational Service Medal, the New Zealand General Service Medal for Afghanistan, the NATO Medal (for service with ISAF) and the New Zealand Defence Service Medal.

== Citation ==
The citation for The New Zealand Gallantry Decoration reads:

On 19 August 2011 Lance Corporal Smith, as a member of the NZSAS Task Force, responded to an insurgent attack on the British Council Offices in the centre of Kabul, Afghanistan. Five insurgents used a Suicide Vehicle Borne Improvised Explosive Device to gain entry into the British Council Offices. Having made entry into the compound they manoeuvred themselves into a strong defensive position where they could rain down small arms fire and rockets and ultimately detonate suicide vests against the rescue force. This incident was complex in nature. Not only was the enemy determined and well-equipped, five British nationals were also isolated within the compound.

Lance Corporal Smith arrived on the scene with other members of the NZSAS who were supporting the Afghan Crisis Response Unit (CRU). As part of a supporting plan Lance Corporal Smith moved into an over-watch position 30 metres away from the insurgents' stronghold. The NZSAS personnel, including Lance Corporal Smith, began to prepare a plan to rescue the hostages and to assist the CRU to clear the compound of insurgents.

At approximately 11.35 am (local time) Corporal Douglas Grant, another member of the Task Force, moved across the backyard of the target building to link up with other NZSAS members. Whilst rushing up a stairwell Corporal Grant was mortally wounded by insurgent fire. Initially it was not known where Corporal Grant had fallen or what condition he was in.

With no concern for his personal safety, Lance Corporal Smith pushed into an exposed position to view and confirm Corporal Grant’s exact location. Lance Corporal Smith saw Corporal Grant lying inside a small structure slightly above him at the top of some stairs. Without hesitation Lance Corporal Smith requested to move to Corporal Grant’s position in order to render first aid, but was told by his Troop Commander to wait for a ballistic shield. During this period Lance Corporal Smith’s position was receiving a significant volume of insurgent machine gun and rifle fire.

Once Lance Corporal Smith received the ballistic shield, he took two deep breaths, gave his Troop Commander a positive nod and the 'GO' call was issued. Covering fire from over-watch positions was directed towards the insurgents as Lance Corporal Smith jumped into the fray. Once again without thought for his personal safety, he leapt over a wall and across exposed and open ground and up the same stairs where Corporal Grant had been shot. All the while, insurgent bullets were impacting around him. Lance Corporal Smith threw himself into the room where Corporal Grant lay and then, with cool and professional resolve, began providing immediate medical treatment. Corporal Grant was not yet confirmed dead and Lance Corporal Smith, also trained in advanced patrol paramedic techniques, applied first aid to the wound and commenced CPR, which he continued to administer until Corporal Grant was evacuated from the building in the care of the Task Force medic. To evacuate Corporal Grant safely, Lance Corporal Smith had to call for other Task Force members to knock a hole in the brick wall of the building that he and Corporal Grant were in. Lance Corporal Smith then calmly returned to the fight. During this stage he again exposed himself to enemy fire so that he could engage the insurgents effectively. He then took part in blowing a large hole in the outer wall of the compound so that he and other members of the Task Force could minimise the open ground they had to cover to get to the panic room where the British captives were hiding. Lance Corporal Smith then provided covering fire as the captives were rushed to safety through the compound wall.

Throughout the entire incident Lance Corporal Smith displayed extreme calmness under pressure, tremendous personal bravery, and the utmost professionalism whilst under continuous insurgent fire. As a result of Lance Corporal Smith’s actions Corporal Grant received the best medical treatment possible, the Task Force was able to recover all five British nationals alive and the insurgent threat was neutralised.
