= Karl Cummins =

Former Commanding Officer of the New Zealand Special Air Service

Colonel Karl Cummins
- Alma mater: University of Auckland; University of Canberra; Officer Cadet School of New Zealand
- Military career
- Allegiance: New Zealand
- Branch: New Zealand Army
- Units: Headquarters Joint Forces New Zealand; New Zealand Special Air Service; Royal New Zealand Corps of Signals
- Commands: New Zealand Special Air Service (2012-2013)
- Conflicts: Operation Burnham; Operation Enduring Freedom; Operation Desert Thunder; Bougainville conflict Regional Assistance Mission to Solomon Islands

Karl Cummins is a New Zealand military officer and was the Commanding Officer of the New Zealand Special Air Service from 2012 to 2013. He was one of the subjects of the New Zealand Government's inquiry into Operation Burnham.

== Career ==
Cummins enlisted in the New Zealand Army in 1989 as a soldier and completed officer training in 1992 where he graduated into the Royal New Zealand Corps of Signals. In 1996 he was selected for service in the New Zealand Special Air Service and served with the unit until 2013 where he served in troop and squadron command roles until he was appointed as the unit's Commanding Officer in 2012.

In 2013, Cummins undertook a two-year secondment from the New Zealand Defence Force to the Ministry of Justice and was the first appointment under a personnel sharing agreement between the agencies.

Cummins served as Assistant Chief Human Resources for the New Zealand Defence Force and as Chief of Staff at Headquarters Joint Forces New Zealand.

== Controversies ==
=== Government inquiry into Operation Burnham ===
Operation Burnham was a joint military operation undertaken by the New Zealand Special Air Service and elements of the Afghan Crisis Response Unit and International Security Assistance Force in Afghanistan's Tirgiran Valley on 21–22 October 2010. Operation Burnham became the subject of the investigative journalists Nicky Hager and Jon Stephenson's book Hit & Run: The New Zealand SAS in Afghanistan and the meaning of honour, which alleged that New Zealand forces had committed war crimes against civilians in the Naik and Khak Khudday Dad villages.

In late December 2018, the New Zealand Government confirmed that they would be holding an inquiry into Operation Burnham. The inquiry was headed by former Prime Minister Sir Geoffrey Palmer and former Solicitor-General Sir Terence Arnold.

Between April and November 2011, Cummins was deputy director of Special Operations (DDSO). He also held the role of DDSO in August 2010 when Operation Burnham was conducted.

=== Search and seizure order at Papakura Military Camp ===
In 2013, Cummins was the subject of a military disciplinary hearing after it was discovered that he backdated a search and seizure order after drugs and weapons were found at the New Zealand Special Air Service's Papakura Military Camp. While Cummins admitted to signing two minutes, which authorised the search and seizure operation two days after it took place, he was cleared, in an investigation headed by Brigadier Charlie Lott, of four counts of negligence and of making false documents.

== Decorations ==
Cummins has been awarded the following decorations and awards:

| New Zealand Operational Service Medal | |
| New Zealand General Service Medal 1992 (Non-Warlike) | With "Bougainville" clasp |
| New Zealand General Service Medal for Afghanistan | |
| NATO Medal for the Non-Article 5 ISAF Operation in Afghanistan | |
| New Zealand Armed Forces Award | |
| New Zealand Defence Service Medal | With "Regular" clasp |
| United States Army Commendation Medal | |
| US Navy and Marine Corps Presidential Unit Citation | Cummins is entitled to wear this emblem on the right breast of the uniform. |
