= Charlie Lott =

New Zealand army officer

Brigadier Charlie Lott MNZM
- Born: Charles Alexander Sylvester Lott
- Education: Deakin University; Stanford Graduate School of Business
- Military career
- Allegiance: New Zealand
- Branch: New Zealand Army
- Commands: Deputy Chief of Army (2011–2012)

Brigadier Charles Alexander Sylvester Lott MNZM is a former New Zealand military officer who served as Deputy Chief of Army from 2011 to 2012, and was Chief of the Joint Defence Services, in a civilian capacity, from 2015 to 2019.

== Biography ==
Lott served with the Royal New Zealand Electrical and Mechanical Engineers and graduated from the Officer Cadet School, Portsea in 1978. In the 1990s, he served with the New Zealand Supply Contingent Somalia, recounting in a later interview the harrowing experience of travelling by road from UNOSOM headquarters in the university compound to the airport:

Speed was the main weapon against Somalis who were often under the influence of the hallucinatory herbal drug known as khat and were taking pot shots. It was common practice for the crew of New Zealand vehicles travelling between Mogadishu and the airport to have their Steyr on "instant", wedged between the front seats ‒ the driver with a Sig Sauer also on "instant", jammed into the door handle. Weapon discipline was very important as was a constant wariness of burning tyres, a Somali signal that there is "bad stuff" about to go down, come and join the fun.

He also recalled the long hours worked on the Somalia mission, and the large volume of rations distributed, including live goats.

In the 2001 New Year Honours, while Lott held the rank of lieutenant colonel in the Royal New Zealand Army Logistic Regiment, he was appointed a Member of the New Zealand Order of Merit.

Lott received a Master of Arts in Strategic Studies from Deakin University in 2007, and studied at the Stanford Graduate School of Business in 2013. He served as Deputy Chief of Army between 2011 and 2012. In November 2013, Lott was the inaugural recipient of the New Zealand Defence Industry Association's Defence Official Award, in recognition of his "exceptional drive and commitment as Commander Logistics to change across the COMLOG organisation and for significant contribution to the improvement of Defence/Industry relationships in the past year".

Lott oversaw the inquiry into Lieutenant Colonel Karl Cummins, commander of the New Zealand Special Air Service, after it was discovered that Cummins had backdated a search and seizure order after drugs and weapons were found at the New Zealand Special Air Service's Papakura Military Camp. In 2014, Lott cleared Cummins of charges of making a false official document or negligently performing a duty.

In March 2015, Lott was named Chief Joint Defence Services, and remained in that position until November 2019. Lott thereafter became the national manager for equipment and logistics at Fire and Emergency New Zealand.
