= Leonard Manning =

New Zealander soldier killed in East Timor

- Born: Leonard William Manning; 15 August 1975; Ngāruawāhia, Waikato, New Zealand
- Died: 24 July 2000 (aged 24); Foho Debalulik hill, Cova Lima, East Timor (present day Timor-Leste)
- Cause of death: Gunshot wound
- Burial place: Rangiriri Cemetery
- Military career
- Allegiance: New Zealand; United Nations; (United Nations) / (Timor-Leste) UN East Timor
- Branch: New Zealand Army
- Service years: c.1994 – 2000
- Rank: Private
- Nicknames: Len, Lenny
- Service number: A997234
- Units: Bravo Company, 2/1 battalion, Royal New Zealand Infantry Regiment
- Known for: First New Zealander killed in combat since the Vietnam War and the first UN peacekeeper killed in East Timor
- Conflicts: 1999 East Timorese crisis †
- Awards: New Zealand Operational Service Medal

Leonard William Manning (15 August 1975 – 24 July 2000) was a private in the Royal New Zealand Infantry Regiment, who was deployed as a United Nations peacekeeper to United Nations Administered East Timor, now the country of Timor-Leste, as a part of the United Nations Transitional Administration in East Timor. In July 2000 he was ambushed near Suai and killed.

Leonard Manning was the first of five UN peacekeeper killed in East Timor, and was the first New Zealander killed in combat since the death of Pvt. Kenneth Horomai Harding on 24 June 1971, in Operation Ivanhoe during the Vietnam War.

== Personal life ==
Leonard William Manning was born on 15 August 1975 to Charlie and Linda Manning in Ngāruawāhia, New Zealand. He would grow up in Waeranga, Waikato District.

Manning joined the New Zealand Defence Force in 1994, and on 21 July 1997 joined the Bravo Company of the Royal New Zealand Infantry Regiment's 2nd/1st Battalion. He deployed to East Timor in late October 1999.

While in East Timor, Manning gained interest in the Tetum language, regularly meeting with interpreters to improve his Tetum, and helping East Timorese children improve their English. Manning was well liked and popular with the local East Timorese population.

== Death ==
On 23 July 2000, a six-man peacekeeping patrol, which included Pvt. Leonard Manning were patrolling the area around Suai. At around 3:00 p.m. the patrol was given information that locals had spotted nine armed pro-Indonesian militiamen dressed in green uniforms, black balaclavas and black boots around the area. They also heard a militant patrol near them, which had also set off a trip flare. At around 10:00 pm, the patrol found fresh tracks in the mud; as they followed the track they heard a group of men talking, and Manning spotted an armed man further up the trail. The patrol commander decided to not pursue the militants, instead setting up an observation post near the Foho Debalulik hill, close to Fohorem and Suai by the West Timor border.

The next morning, the patrol found more evidence of militant activity, finding laying up positions for seven to nine personnel, and another one for as many as 20 personnel. The patrol continued following tracks they had found the previous night for 20 to 30 metres.

At approximately 10:45am, as they neared the hill's peak, they made contact with Jacobus Bere, (Note: some sources call him Yacobus) a farmer-turned-militant from Suai. Bere opened fire, aiming towards Manning who was near the front of the patrol; Manning was shot once in the head and killed instantly. Exposed, the other five soldiers came under fire from several other militants hidden with Bere.

One of the patrol members, Private Philip Murray Cheater, attempted to make contact with Manning, but found him already dead. Exposed and under fire, Cheater and the patrol were forced to retreat, leaving Manning's body. Cheater received minor injuries from bullets hitting the trees around him, causing wood to fly off and splinter into his face.

After the patrol withdrew, the militants approached Manning's corpse and took his gun, before slitting his throat and cutting off both of his ears with a machete. His body was left on the trail for several hours before it was recovered mid-afternoon.

== Aftermath ==
The morning of 10 August 2000, a group of around 14 Nepali peacekeepers moved into the Beko area near Suai, where approximately 30 pro-Indonesian militia were hiding; they attempted to flush out the militiamen from the area with the help of Fijian peacekeeprs. At approximately 5:20am, militants ambushed the Nepali peacekeepers; two peacekeepers, Private Devi Ram Yaishi and Dilliraman Kafle, were shot. Yaishi was fatally hit in the chest and succumbed to his wounds while being airlifted away, and Kafle recovered from his wounds at a hospital in Dili.

In October 2001 Bere was arrested in West Timor and was flown to Jakarta to appear in court. The trial was held in March 2002, with Bere being tried alongside Fabianus Ulu, Yohanes Timo and Gabriel Hale Noni. Bere was charged for first and second degree murder, while Ulu, Timo, and Hale Noni were charged with premeditated murder, and were proposed to get the death penalty. The prosecution proposed that Bere receive a 12-year sentence and that the other three receive 10 year sentences. On the 7 March, Bere was given a six-year sentence, while Ulu, Timo and Hale Honi were all acquitted.

In early February 2003 Gabriel Moruk was arrested by police in West Timor for his involvement in Manning's death. After locals tipped off police, he was found in a hole in the jungle, with a rifle and several hand grenades. Moruk admitted his involvement in the ambush.

== Legacy ==
Manning was first buried at the cemetery in Tilomar, and a memorial was erected in his honor. On 29 July, his body was returned to New Zealand, and he was buried with full military honors at the Rangiriri Cemetery.

Shortly after Manning's death, New Zealand Prime Minister, Helen Clark, gave a statement, saying: "Private Leonard Manning's legacy will be the role he played in UNTAET's essential work in bringing stability to East Timor".

In 2003 Manning was posthumously awarded the New Zealand Operational Service Medal.

On 30 December 2004, Philip Cheater – the soldier who attempted to make contact with Manning – was awarded the New Zealand Gallantry Decoration.
