= New Zealand Supply Contingent Somalia =

New Zealand Supply Detachment/Platoon
- Active: 1992–94
- Disbanded: 1994
- Country: New Zealand
- Branch: New Zealand Army
- Type: UN led Peacekeeping Operation (Troops)
- Role: Provision of supply support for the UNOSOM Mission
- Size: 25 to 43
- Garrison/HQ: Taniwha Hill Mogadishu

The New Zealand Army contributed Royal New Zealand Army Ordnance Corps (RNZAOC) supply elements (with RNZCT, RNZEME, RNZSig, RNZMC specialist attachments) to the International and United Nations Operation in Somalia (UNOSOM) efforts in Somalia.

== New Zealand Supply Detachment ==
The New Zealand Army first deployed to Somalia in 1992 with a Supply Detachment which was part of the original United Nations Operation in Somalia, (UNOSOM). To facilitate purchase of goods in neighbouring Kenya, personnel were also deployed there on a regular basis. The original commitment was 28-strong, with most members arriving in Somalia in early 1993.

== New Zealand Supply Platoon ==
The Supply Detachment was replaced in July 1993 with a larger 43-strong Supply Platoon. Due to the deteriorating security situation it included an infantry section from 1st Battalion Royal New Zealand Infantry Regiment (1 RNZIR). This Platoon witnessed the Battle of Mogadishu unfold including the events of the infamous Black Hawk Down incident.

A second Supply Platoon rotated in January 1994. This platoon was present for the draw-down and withdrawal of all of the western forces which was completed by 30 March 1994, which then left the New Zealand platoon, Australian MOVCON, Air Traffic Controllers and ASASR troop and the Irish Transport Company as the few western contingents remaining in Somalia.

== Role ==
The role of the New Zealand Supply units was the provision of supplies to the UN Force, to facilitate this a section was based at the seaport working with the prime UN contractor Morris Catering, and a section was based at the airport where a warehouse was maintained holding general stores.

== Conditions in Somalia ==
The New Zealand troops were poorly equipped and only issued with basic small arms and fragmentation vests, which given the threat level were totally inadequate for the task. Vehicle movement was by light skinned commercial vehicles and due to the risk of ambush and IEDs was limited, and often the situation deteriorated to a state where vehicle movement was stopped altogether, and helicopters had to be used to fly to United Nations locations around Mogadishu. Gunfire was constant, with Somali bandits climbing into the surrounding buildings and sporadically firing into the airfield and seaport, with random mortar fire also been a constant threat and annoyance. An increasing casualty list of UN personnel and relief workers, served as a continuing reminder of the hostility and dangers of serving in Somalia.

Brigadier Charlie Lott, who served in Somalia before becoming Chief, Joint Defence Services, recalls that the drive between the UNOSOM HQ in the university compound in Mogadishu itself and the airport was hair-raising.

Speed was the main weapon against Somalis who were often under the influence of the hallucinatory herbal drug known as khat and were taking pot shots. It was common practice for the crew of New Zealand vehicles travelling between Mogadishu and the airport to have their Steyr on "instant", wedged between the front seats ‒ the driver with a Sig Sauer also on "instant", jammed into the door handle.

Weapon discipline was very important as was a constant wariness of burning tyres, a Somali signal that there is "bad stuff" about to go down, come and join the fun.

The New Zealanders, he said, worked long hours, often ten hours a day, seven days a week. In one month alone more than 1,000 tonnes of rations were distributed, including live goats.

== Taniwha Hill ==
The New Zealanders home in Mogadishu was a camp in the sand-hills between the Indian ocean and Mogadishu Airport which had been christened "Taniwha Hill". Taniwha Hill was a self-contained location with heavily sandbagged tents providing the most austere accommodation, and a large mess tent/kitchen/recreation area as the central point of the camp. Ablution facility's were basic with buckets for showers and dissected 44 gallon drums for toilets, which required the daily disposal by stirring and burning. Modern ablution blocks with hot and cold running water and flush toilets were provided in the last weeks of the deployment.

== Withdrawal ==
The Supply Platoons ended their mission in June 1994.

== Kiwi Somalia Veterans Facebook ==
The Kiwi Somalia Veterans have an active Facebook Group, Taniwha Hill – Kiwi Somalia Veterans where members keep in touch, share photos and organise events.
