= Hopuhopu Camp =

Former New Zealand Army Camp

Hopuhopu Military Camp
- Ngāruawāhia, New Zealand

Site information
- Type: Army camp
- Owner: Waikato Tainui
- Condition: Former military camp

Location
- Coordinates: 37.636994°S 175.169654°E

Site history
- Built: 1924–1929
- In use: 1920–1989

Hopuhopu was a New Zealand Army Camp in use from 1920 to 1989 and located 5 km (3.1 mi) north of the town of Ngāruawāhia.

== History ==
From 1853 Hopuhopu was the site of a boys' mission school, which lost most of its pupils in 1862 and, by 1863, was reported as in disrepair, with the mission house burnt down in 1886. With he construction of the Auckland to Te Awamutu leg of the North Island Main trunk Line in the 1870s, the land that Hopuhopu occupied was passed into the possession of the New Zealand Railway Department.

Acquired by the Defence Department in 1920 in exchange for defence land at Frankton Junction, Hopuhopu was to become the site of the Northern Command Mobilisation Depot. Hopuhopu was used as a tented camp for Territorial army training throughout the 1920s whilst construction of the permanent infrastructure was undertaken with the first buildings handed over and taken into use during 1927, with final construction completed in August 1929 at a cost of £130,000 (2019 NZD$12,845,552.24). At the time, the camp was the most modern military camp in New Zealand.

Hopuhopu served in its intended role as a mobilisation camp in 1939/40, as elements of the 2nd New Zealand Expeditionary Force Mobilised at Hopuhopu for overseas service.

Hopuhopu remained as an active military camp until 1989, where as part of number of base closures across the New Zealand Defence Force, Hopuhopu ceased to be an active military camp. In 1993 the camp was returned to Waikato-Tainui, who converted it to their headquarters and Waikato-Tainui College for Research and Development.

== Alternative names ==
From 1927 the camp's official name was 'Waikato Camp', but 'Hopuhopu' was the name that was generally used. New Zealand Army Order 5/60 was issued on 6 April 1960 officially changing the name from 'Waikato Camp' to 'Ngaruawahia Camp'.

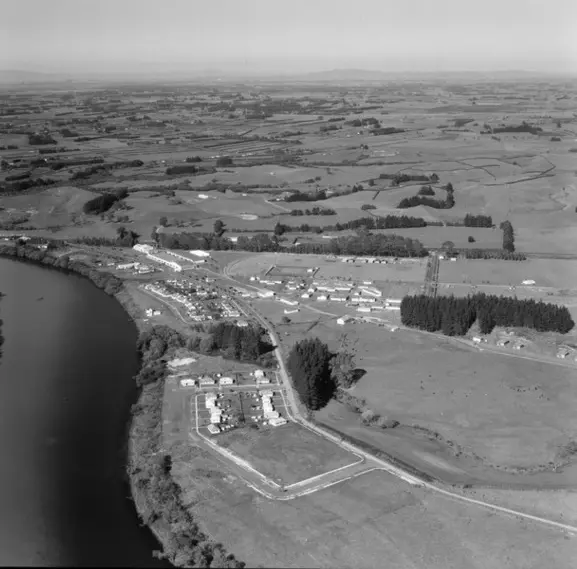
Aerial view of Hopuhopu Military Camp, 1961

== See also ==
- Burnham Camp
- Linton Military Camp
- Papakura Military Camp
- Trentham Military Camp
- Waiouru Military Camp
