= Ian Burrows =

New Zealand Army officer

- Born: 11 November 1930; Christchurch, New Zealand
- Died: 22 July 2006 (aged 75); Auckland, New Zealand
- Burial place: North Shore Memorial Park and Crematorium, Albany, North Shore City
- Spouse: Judy Jenkinson
- Relatives: Jim Burrows (father)
- Military career
- Allegiance: New Zealand
- Branch: New Zealand Army
- Service years: 1953–1985
- Rank: Brigadier
- Nickname: Buzz
- Service number: U34196
- Unit: New Zealand Special Air Service
- Commands: Commander of Land Forces, New Zealand
- Conflicts: Malayan Emergency; Indonesia–Malaysia confrontation
- Awards: Officer of the Order of the British Empire; Military Cross; Negri Sembilan Conspicuous Gallantry Medal (Malaysia)

Brigadier Ian Hamilton Burrows OBE, MC (11 November 1930 – 22 July 2006) was a senior New Zealand Army officer. He served with the New Zealand Special Air Service in Malaya in 1955 as one of the "originals" before going on to senior command positions in the New Zealand Army, culminating in his promotion to brigadier and appointment as Commander of Land Forces New Zealand in 1981.

== Background ==
Burrows was educated at Waitaki Boys' High School, Oamaru, New Zealand, where he captained the cricket first XI, was a member of the rugby first XV, boxed, played tennis and was noted as a talented artist. In 1950 he was selected to attend the Royal Military College, Duntroon, and was commissioned into the Royal New Zealand Infantry Regiment in 1953.

In 1959, Burrows married Judith Anne Jenkinson, and the couple went on to have four children.

== Army career ==
In 1955 he was selected to deploy to Malaya as a troop commander with the newly formed New Zealand Special Air Service Squadron. On 27 April 1955, Burrows led a patrol, which after two days tracking, located a communist jungle camp. The patrol conducted a dawn assault against the camp, killing the occupants, which included Malaysian Communist leader Li Hak Chi. On 17 October 1955, Burrows led a patrol, which after an arduous ten-hour move through thick jungle and over steep terrain, mounted an immediate attack which killed a terrorist. For these two actions he was awarded the Military Cross and the Negri Sembilan Conspicuous Gallantry Medal from Malaysia.

Following his return to New Zealand, he served as aide-de-camp to Governor General, Lord Cobham, before spending two years as adjutant of the Nelson Marlborough West Coast Regiment. In 1963, Burrows deployed to Borneo, serving as a company commander during the Indonesian confrontation. Upon his return to New Zealand in 1965, Burrows commanded the NZSAS Squadron, before moving on to staff appointments in Wellington. From 1970 to 1973 Burrows served as the Defence Liaison Officer based in Kuala Lumpur, before returning home to be appointed as Commandant of Army Schools. He went on to command the 3rd Task Force Region, in Christchurch, before being promoted to brigadier. He was appointed commander, Land Forces New Zealand between 1981 and 1983 and commander, New Zealand Forces South East Asia, Singapore from 1983 to 1985, before his final appointment of Commander of Land Forces New Zealand in 1985. He retired from the army in 1985.

== Retirement ==
He was appointed Colonel Commandant of the NZSAS in 1987, a position he held until 1997. Burrows was appointed chairman of the Rothmans Sports Foundation in 1987 and was elected president of the Outward Bound Trust (New Zealand) in 1991.

== Honours and awards ==
In 1957, Burrows was awarded the Military Cross. His citation read:

"For courage, leadership and determination in spite of physical exhaustion during jungle operations against Communist terrorists."

Also in 1957, he received the Negri Sembilan Conspicuous Gallantry Medal (Pingat Keberanian Chemriang):

"Lt. Burrows was a Troop Commander in the 22 Special Air Service Regiment stationed at Kuala Pilah. On 19th August, 1957 he commanded a patrol operating in the Angsi Forest Reserve area in the vicinity of Sungei Batu Hampar. Late in the afternoon on that day his patrol contacted a group of terrorists killing one and wounding a second whom the terrorists have since reported dead. With complete disregard of his own personal safety Lt. Burrows charged forward and personally killed D.C.M. Li Hak Chi in his encounter. Li Hak Chi was undoubtly the most able military terrorist in the Mountainous District and he was responsible for many successful ambushes and atrocities particularly in the Tampin area. The other terrorists who were among the group of CTs contacted by patrols under the leadership of Lt Burrows and it was his tactical skill and personal leadership was resulted in the elimination and the virtual destruction of the Tampin/Pedas CT Armed Work Force. Lt. Burrows endurance, courage and determination throughout the operations were an inspiration to the remainder of the platoon and in recognition of his services, His Highness the Regent of Negri Sembilan has been graciously pleased to confer on Lt. Burrows the Negri Simbilan Conspicuous Gallantry Medal (Pingat Keberanian Chemrlang)."

In the 1979 Queen's Birthday Honours, Burrows was appointed an Officer of the Order of the British Empire (Military Division).
