= Niwa Kawha =

Niwa Kawha BEM
- Military career
- Branch: New Zealand Army
- Rank: Staff Sergeant
- Service number: 348062
- Unit: New Zealand Special Air Service
- Awards: Mention in Dispatches (1965); British Empire Medal (1966)

Niwa Kawha BEM served with 1 and 4 Detachments, 1st Ranger Squadron, New Zealand Special Air Service (NZSAS), during the Borneo Confrontation. Kawha was mentioned in dispatches and received the British Empire Medal for his service.

Kawha was formerly of Opotiki and joined the Regular Force of the New Zealand Army in 1958. He served with the 2nd New Zealand Regiment in Malaya, and was promoted to corporal. After contracting a severe illness he returned to New Zealand to convalesce and, in 1962 after recovering, he voluntarily relinquished his rank to join the NZSAS. Kawha was subsequently promoted to Corporal again while serving with the NZSAS.

During his first tour of Borneo, Kawha was lead scout of a patrol commanded by Lieutenant Eru Manuera which was inserted on 16 May 1965 to conduct a surprise attack on a camp at Mangaku. After initiating an ambush, the patrol was aggressively followed up by Indonesian forces. During the withdrawal Kawha, threw a grenade which bounced off a tree towards the patrol, fortuitously it failed to explode. For his role in the patrol, Kawha was mentioned in dispatches. In the 1966 New Year Honours, he was awarded the British Empire Medal (Military Division).

During his service with 4 Detachment in Borneo, Kawha (by then a staff sergeant) served as a patrol commander. A patrol that he led had the last sighting of any enemy by the NZSAS during the Confrontation, and the patrol was in the process of following up, when the peace accord was signed, and the patrol was withdrawn and returned to base. He subsequently served with the NZSAS in a Territorial capacity, and also served with the New Zealand Police in the Armed Offenders Squad and Anti-Terrorist Squad.

In 1968, Kawha played three rugby union matches for the Wanganui representative team.

On 20 August 2009, Kawha (then of Tauranga), along with four others or their next-of-kin, was formally presented with their Mention in Dispatches by the chief of Army Major General Lou Gardiner at the 6 Hauraki Battalion Group Headquarters in Tauranga, after it was discovered that a number of awards of the Mention in Dispatches had not formally been presented.
