= Trentham Military Camp =

- Trentham, New Zealand

Site information
- Type: Military Camp
- Controlled by: New Zealand Defence Force

Location
- Coordinates: 41.1435°S 175.0358°E

Site history
- In use: c.1914–present

Trentham Military Camp is a New Zealand Defence Force (NZDF) facility located in Trentham, Upper Hutt, near Wellington. Originally a New Zealand Army installation, it is now run by Defence and accommodates all three services. It also hosts Joint NZDF facilities including:

- Commander Joint Forces New Zealand
- Headquarters Joint Forces New Zealand (HQ JFNZ), Private Bag 900 or 2 Seddul Bahr Road.
- New Zealand Defence College (incorporating former Staff Colleges)
- Command Staff College
- NZDF Personnel Records, Archives & Medals

Elements of Army General Staff at Trentham Camp (including Messines Defence Centre) are:

- Logistic Executive (Log Exec)
- Human Resources Executive (HR Exec)- Military Secretary (MS) and Military Career Management (MCM)
- Capability Branch (Cap Br)

Units at Trentham Military Camp include:

- Trade Training School (TTS)
- Wellington Regional Support Centre (WRSC)
- 1st (New Zealand) Military Intelligence Company
- 1st (New Zealand) Military Police Company
- 1st (New Zealand) Explosive Ordnance Disposal Squadron
- HQ Coy, 5/7 RNZIR
- Joint Military Police Unit Headquarters
- 7th Battalion Band
- Logistics Command (Land)
- CUHCU (City of Upper Hutt Cadet Unit), NZCC
- No. 22 Squadron, ATC

== Civilian police ==
Prior to 1981 (when the college moved to Porirua), the camp was also home to the Royal New Zealand Police College.

== Defence Siding ==
Map of the historic rail sidings

From 1941 to 1954 there were several railway sidings in the Camp used for freight and for troop trains, with a shunting locomotive owned by the Army. Most of the tracks were removed in the 1970s. The siding was 0.53 km from Trentham Railway Station and 0.63 km from Heretaunga Railway Station. A second siding ran back to the Ministry of Works Depot, which was on the site formerly occupied by the former Central Institute of Technology campus. The dates of opening and closing of the Trentham Camp station (a temporary stopping place) are given as 11/8/1942 to 9/2/1953.

== Barracks ==
The barracks are all associated with World War 1. This is appropriate because World War 1 saw the major development of Trentham Camp and thousands of soldiers trained there before they left for the battlefields of 1914–1918.

=== Armentières Barracks ===
Named after the French town of Armentières, which was utilised by the New Zealand Division as a rest area during World War 1.

=== Chailak Dere Barracks ===
Chailak Dere Barracks commemorates an action by the men of the Wellington Mounted Rifles on the night of 6/7 August 1915.

=== El Arish Barracks ===
Named after the town of el-ʻArīsh on the Sinai Peninsula which was occupied by the New Zealand Mounted Rifle Brigade in December 1916.

=== Helles Barracks ===
Named after Cape Helles on the Gallipoli Peninsula.

=== Jericho Barracks ===
Commemorates the town of Jericho in Palestine which the New Zealand Mounted Rifle Brigade passed through in 1918.

=== Le Quesnoy Barracks ===
Le Qesnoy Barracks are named after the French town of Le Quesnoy that the New Zealand Division Liberated on 5 November 1918.

=== Messines Barracks ===
Messines Barracks are named after the 7–14 June 1917 Battle.

=== Passechendaele Barracks ===
Passechendaele Barracks are Named after the 12 October - 10 November 1917 Battle which was the greatest disaster in New Zealand Military history.

=== Salonica Barracks ===
Salonica Barracks are named after Salonica (modern Thessalonika), in North Eastern Greece which was the base of the 1st New Zealand Stationary Hospital during the Gallipoli Campaign.

=== Sinai Barracks ===
Sinai Barracks are named after the campaign in which he New Zealand Mounted Brigade fought against Turkey during the First World War.

=== Ypres Barracks ===
Ypres Barracks commemorates the series of battles fought around the Belgium town of Ypres during the First World War.

== Marches ==
During World War I over 30,000 New Zealand soldiers marched between military camps at Trentham, Upper Hutt and Featherston via the Rimutaka Hill Road, in a three-day trek of 27 miles (43.5 km). There were 23 marches of 500 to 1800 men between September 1915 and April 1918, at the end of their training as reinforcements for the New Zealand Expeditionary Force.

== See also ==
- Burnham, New Zealand
- Featherston Military Camp
- Hopuhopu Camp
- Linton Military Camp
- Papakura Military Camp
- Waiouru Military Camp
