= Frank Rennie =

New Zealand army officer (1918–1992)

- Born: 9 August 1918; Christchurch, New Zealand
- Died: 17 November 1992 (aged 74); Bay of Islands, New Zealand
- Military career
- Allegiance: New Zealand
- Branch: New Zealand Army
- Service years: 1936–1970
- Rank: Colonel
- Commands: New Zealand Special Air Service
- Conflicts: World War II; Malayan Emergency
- Awards: Commander of the Order of the British Empire; Military Cross; Mentioned in Despatches
- Other work: Outward Bound

Colonel Frank Rennie CBE, MC (9 August 1918 – 17 November 1992) was a career soldier in the New Zealand Army, holding every rank between private and colonel, and founder of the New Zealand Special Air Service.

== Early life and army service ==
Rennie was born on 9 August 1918 in Christchurch, New Zealand. At age 13 he suffered a slipped upper femoral epiphysis of the hip, which resulted in his spending nearly 20 months in hospital. Rennie later wrote in his autobiography that after spending so long bedridden believing he would be crippled, he felt compelled to "prove to myself that I could do anything most others could do", and viewed the Army as a way of achieving this. He subsequently joined the Canterbury Regiment of the Territorial Force at age 16, before joining the New Zealand Army in late 1936. After completing basic training at Trentham Military Camp Rennie was first posted to the Royal New Zealand Artillery, but did not enjoy it and was "first in the queue" to transfer to the Permanent Staff Instructors. At the completion of the training course Rennie was promoted to lance corporal, temporary sergeant.

== World War II ==
For the first two years of the war Rennie continued as an instructor, as the instructing staff could not be spared for active service. During this time he helped select the initial officers and Non-commissioned officers for the 28th (Maori) Battalion, and was for a period 'in interregnum' the Regimental Sergeant Major of Army Schools. Rennie observed that he, "must have been the youngest to have done so and, I am sure, with the most curious assortment of ranks—I was a substantive lance-corporal, temporary sergeant, acting warrant officer first class."

After the Japanese attack on Pearl Harbor in December 1941, the 37th Battalion was rapidly raised to help reinforce Fiji and three instructors including Rennie were allowed to join with the rank of sergeant. During his time in Fiji Rennie was commissioned and transferred to 30th Battalion as a platoon commander.

After spending two years mainly garrisoning islands and training, Rennie participated in a reconnaissance in force to Nissan Island on 31 January 1944, in which future US Presidents John F. Kennedy and Richard Nixon were also involved. He also took part in the seizure of the island the following month. When the 3rd Division was disbanded later in 1944, Rennie joined 2nd Division in Italy, arriving early in 1945. He was posted to 23rd Battalion and commanded a Vickers MG platoon, seeing action in the river-crossing the 2nd Division conducted as it pushed northwards through Italy in the final months of the war in Europe. His unit finished the war near Trieste, and was involved in the stand-off with Yugoslav Partisans.

== Jayforce to NZSAS ==
Rennie served with Jayforce, New Zealand's contribution to the occupation of Japan, between March and August 1946 before returning to instructional positions including a posting to the British Army School of Infantry and two and a half years as Chief Instructor of the New Zealand School of Infantry. He was involved in establishing instructional and training standards, and was appointed a Member of the Order of the British Empire.

In 1955, Rennie was selected to form, train and command the New Zealand Special Air Service Squadron (NZSAS) for service in the Malayan Emergency. On this he wrote, "I must have been the only New Zealand officer ever to be given the right of total selection of all ranks in an organisation he was going to train and command operationally."

== Malaya to Fiji ==
In late 1955 the Squadron deployed to Malaya and served successfully for two years, 18 months of which were spent operating in the jungle. Rennie often participated directly in operations, and for his actions during this time he was awarded the Military Cross and Mentioned in Despatches. Upon returning to New Zealand the NZSAS Squadron was disbanded, and Rennie held a number of mainly staff roles before in 1961 taking up the position of Assistant Army Liaison Officer at the High Commission of New Zealand in London until 1965. He returned to New Zealand to become Commandant of the Army Schools at Waiouru.

After nearly 18 months at Waiouru, Rennie was promoted to colonel and appointed as Commander of the Fiji Military Forces, a position he held until late 1969 as Fiji went through a period of racial tension between Indo-Fijians and Indigenous Fijians leading up to Fiji's independence from Britain in 1970. Rennie focused on fostering co-operation between the Fijian military and police, and on preparing the military to support the police in case of serious civil unrest, which threatened but did not eventuate during his tenure. Shortly after returning from Fiji, having been promoted to Commander of the Order of the British Empire, Rennie retired from the Army in 1970 after 34 years of service.

== Post army ==
Rennie became involved in youth leadership and was chairman of the Rothmans Sport Foundation and involved with the Outward Bound Trust including being president between 1981 and 1982. He continued to be involved with the NZSAS as Colonel Commandant.

== Family ==
Rennie was married three times, his first wife, Beatrice Plummer dying in the early 1950s, after which he married Colleen Patterson in 1955. After her death he married Barbara Cassrelsls in Auckland in 1989. He had three children: a son and a daughter with his first wife, and a son with his second.

== Honours and awards ==
- Promoted Commander of the Order of the British Empire (Military Division) – 1970

Appointed Member of the Order of the British Empire (Military Division) – 1954

- Military Cross – 1958

For courage, leadership and self discipline in command of the Special Air Service Squadron from New Zealand, during two years of successful jungle warfare against communist bandits.

- Mention in Despatches – 1957

The Queen has been graciously pleased to approve as on the 30th August, 1957, that the following be Mentioned in recognition of gallant and distinguished conduct in operations in Malaya during the period ending on that date.
