= New Zealand Special Air Service =

1st New Zealand Special Air Service Regiment
- Cap Badge of the New Zealand Special Air Service
- Active: 7 July 1955 – present
- Country: New Zealand
- Branch: New Zealand Army
- Type: Special forces
- Role: Special operations Counter-terrorism
- Part of: Special Operations Component Command
- Garrison/HQ: Papakura Military Camp, Auckland, New Zealand
- Motto: "Who Dares Wins"
- March: The Liberty Bell
- Anniversaries: 7 July 1955
- Engagements: Malayan Emergency; Indonesian Confrontation; Vietnam War; Operation Midford; 1999 East Timorese crisis • INTERFET; • UNTAET; War in Afghanistan
- Decorations: Navy and Marine P.U.C. United States Navy Presidential Unit Citation

Commanders
- Notable commanders: Colonel Frank Rennie; Lieutenant General Tim Keating; Lieutenant General Jerry Mateparae

The 1st New Zealand Special Air Service Regiment, abbreviated as 1 NZSAS Regt, is the special forces unit of the New Zealand Army, closely modelled on the British Special Air Service (SAS). It was formed on 7 July 1955. It traces its origins to the Second World War and the famous Long Range Desert Group that New Zealanders served with.

The New Zealand Government states that NZSAS is the "premier combat unit of the New Zealand Defence Force" and it has been operationally deployed to locations including the Pacific region, Afghanistan, and the jungles of South-East Asia. Individual members of the NZSAS have received honours and awards, most notably the Victoria Cross for New Zealand awarded to Corporal Willie Apiata. In 2004, the unit was awarded the United States Presidential Unit Citation for its contribution in Afghanistan.

The NZSAS was accorded regimental status in 2013. It has the responsibility of conducting special operations, domestic counter-terrorism or in South Pacific countries when requested, and performing the disposal of chemical, biological, radiological, nuclear, and explosive hazards for military and civilian authorities.

In the mid-2020s, it was reported that one of the regiment's sabre squadrons was under strength and that as a result the regiment's commando squadron had been disbanded.

== History ==
The NZSAS can trace its roots back to the famous Long Range Desert Group, a British/Commonwealth army unit which fought in the North African desert in World War II. New Zealanders also served in the original Special Air Service force during World War II. In February 1955, it was decided by the New Zealand Government that a squadron based on the British Special Air Service should be formed as part of the New Zealand Army, as an effective and economic contribution to the Far East Strategic Reserve and the British counter-insurgency effort in Malaya. Major Frank Rennie was appointed to form and command the unit, with the decision having been made to recruit mainly from the general public around a cadre of Regular Force personnel. Applicants had to be single, under six-foot (183 cm), weigh less than 185lbs (85kg), have their own teeth, good eyesight, and no criminal record. Over 800 applied, from which 182, including 138 civilians (though 101 had previous military experience) were selected for training beginning in June 1955. In late 1957, soon after the squadron's return to New Zealand from Malaya, the unit was disbanded, having been operationally replaced by an infantry battalion. The NZSAS was re-established in October 1959, with the unit celebrating its 50th Jubilee from 3–12 June 2005.

The NZSAS were granted the Freedom of the Borough of Thames on 27 September 1967.

As part of changes the NZDF's command structure, the 1st New Zealand Special Air Service Regiment was transferred to the command of the new Special Operations Component Command(New Zealand) on 1 July 2015

=== Unit location ===
When the unit was first established in 1955, prior to the departure to Malaya all training was conducted at Waiouru Military Camp. Upon re-establishment of the squadron in October 1959, it was based at Papakura Military Camp, until the unit was relocated to Hobsonville Air Force Base in the mid-1990s, however the NZSAS Counter-Terrorism and demolitions training facilities remained at Papakura and Ardmore Military Camps. In 2001–2002 a new facility for the unit was built at Papakura Military Camp. The facility was named 'Rennie Lines', after the founding NZSAS Commanding Officer Major Frank Rennie and officially opened on 14 December 2002. The Battle Training Facility (BTF) was officially opened on 8 April 2016 in the Ardmore Military Training Area for counter-terrorist training to replace facilities over 30 years old.

=== Unit designation ===
On 1 May 1955, after the Cabinet had given its approval the 'New Zealand Special Air Service Squadron' was formally established. From 24 August 1963 the unit was renamed to '1 Ranger Squadron New Zealand Special Air Service', in recognition of the 'Forest Rangers' who fought in the New Zealand Wars being one of New Zealand's first Special Forces units. The unit reverted to '1st New Zealand Special Air Service Squadron' on 1 April 1978. From 1 January 1985 the unit was known as '1st New Zealand Special Air Services Group' until its re-designation as a Regiment before February 2013.

=== Dress distinctions ===
When the unit was established in 1955, approval was given for members to wear a maroon beret. The maroon beret was chosen as it was the then colour of the British Special Air Service beret. However, the British changed their beret colour to ecru (sandy-coloured) in late 1957, the same colour as had been worn by the SAS during the early stages of World War II. On 19 December 1985, approval was granted by the (then) New Zealand chief of general staff, Major General John Mace, who had previously deployed to Malaya with the original NZSAS Squadron, for the NZSAS to switch from maroon to the sandy-coloured beret worn by other Commonwealth Special Air Service units. A parade was held on 21 March 1986 to formally hand the new beret over to the unit.

To show the close association between the NZSAS and the British Special Air Service, members of NZSAS are authorised to wear black rank on all orders of dress except mess dress and to wear black web belts whenever web belts are ordered to be worn.

=== 2020s retention issues ===
In the mid-2020s, it was reported that one of the regiment's two sabre squadrons was operating at less than half strength as a consequence of operators since 2021 leaving the regiment for lucrative private military and security contactor jobs overseas. As a result of the regiment's low personnel numbers, the commando squadron responsible for responding to domestic counter terrorism incidents had reportedly been disbanded in 2023, and its role returned to the sabre squadrons.

== Operational deployments ==
=== Malaya 1955–57 ===
On 20 November 1955 the NZSAS Squadron departed from New Zealand and after completing parachute training in Changi, Singapore, a 133-strong NZSAS Squadron was attached to the British SAS in Malaya. After undertaking jungle training in the rugged mountains of Perak, the squadron went on to spend approximately 18 of the 24 months it was in Malaya operating in the jungle to fight against pro-independence guerrillas of the Malayan National Liberation Army (MNLA), the armed wing of the Malayan Communist Party (MCP).

SAS operations in Malaya consisted of going deep into the jungle, locating local people and moving them for their protection, then seeking out MNLA guerrillas in the area and 'destroying' them. From 2 April 1956 when the New Zealand Squadron became operational it was deployed to the Fort Brooke area, bordering the states of Perak and Kelantan. From late 1956 the squadron operated in the 'mountainous' area of Negri Sembilan, between the towns of Seremban, Kuala Pilah, and Tampin. In both locations the squadron was involved in successful operations eliminating the local MNLA groups. During the two-year tour New Zealand patrols were involved in 14 separate engagements with the MNLA, killing fifteen, capturing one and taking the surrender of nine others. The squadron suffered two fatalities. On 2 May 1956 while patrolling, Trooper A.R. Thomas was fatally wounded, and on 11 May 1957 Corporal A.G. Buchanan died of heat stroke while on patrol. The squadron returned home in December 1957. Within the NZSAS, they are known as 'the Originals'.

=== Thailand 1962 ===
At the request of the Royal Thai Government a detachment of 30 men were stationed in Thailand from 2 June to 16 September 1962 during the Laotian crisis. The detachment was split into two Troops, with one working with United States Special Forces and the Marines at Udon in the north-east and the other deployed with a reinforced United States Army battle group at Khao in the central region. Neither Troop took part in any operations involving action against the enemy, but the deployment provided the detachment with an opportunity to train in jungle and mounted operations while working with American and Thai forces.

=== Borneo 1965–66 ===
In late 1964, during the Indonesian Confrontation (Konfrontasi) in West Malaysia, the New Zealand Government authorised the deployment of a New Zealand Special Air Service detachment to assist with countering Indonesian Communist insurgents in Borneo. The unit was deployed alongside its British and Australian Special Air Service counterparts. The Detachments served under the operational command of the 22nd Special Air Service Regiment and were employed on reconnaissance tasks and ambushing operations including Operation Claret crossborder operations. These involved crossing the border into Indonesia to gain intelligence information and later deter the Indonesians from infiltrating across the border into Borneo.

In February 1965, the first detachment of 40 men under the command of Major W.J.D. (Bill) Meldrum, known as 1 Detachment, 1st Ranger Squadron, New Zealand Special Air Service, departed for Malaysia. However, as a result of a perceived operational security breach Meldrum was replaced by Major Brian Worsnop from 3 April 1965. After a period of training with 22 SAS, 1 Detachment inserted its initial patrols on 8 April 1965. 1 Detachment carried out patrols, stopping for a training break from June to July 1965, until it was replaced by 2 Detachment on 11 October 1965. 2 Detachment was commanded by Major Rod Dearing and again composed of 40 men. It performed similar tasks to 1 Detachment; 2 Detachment's later patrols were conducted in the Sabah area, "particularly rugged, steep and rocky". The detachment was withdrawn from operations on 10 February 1966, and was replaced by 3 Detachment which was commanded by Major David Ogilvy, who had previously deployed to Malaya with the original NZSAS Squadron. 3 Detachment conducted patrols from February, with the Detachment's last patrol conducted over the period 16 to 28 May 1966, which was also the last CLARET patrol conducted by the NZSAS. 4 Detachment arrived in Borneo in June 1966 under the command of Major David Moloney, just after CLARET operations had been stopped. As a result, this Detachment was utilised to continue a 'hearts-and-minds' campaign to gain support of local Punan tribes living near the border. On 12 August 1966 a formal peace treaty was signed by Indonesia and Malaysia and with the Confrontation finally at an end, 4 Detachment officially became non-operational on 9 September 1966. However the Detachment remained in Borneo until October 1966 before it returned to New Zealand.

=== Vietnam 1968–71 ===
On 16 November 1968, a Troop from 1 Ranger Squadron, NZSAS known as 4 Troop, New Zealand Special Air Service, was deployed to the Republic of South Vietnam. The Troop consisting of one officer and 25 other ranks was based in Nui Dat, South Vietnam and served in the 1st Australian Task Force, attached to the Australian Special Air Service Regiment (SASR) which had arrived in 1966. Up until October 1968 the Australian SAS were performing a much wider and more aggressive range of actions, however, the new task force commander who took over reverted the SAS role to intelligence gathering and some ambush patrols. After a build-up period, the first New Zealand commanded patrol commenced on 7 January 1969. The SAS squadrons supported the Australian and New Zealand infantry forces in Operation Goodward during January. At the end of February a new rotation of Australian SAS arrived and joint-operations continued.

The troopers were primarily employed on Long-Range Reconnaissance Patrols (LRRP) across Phuoc Tuy and into Bien Hoa province, mostly around the Mây Tào Mountains where the Communist headquarters were located. Patrols were to collect information for 1ATF and sometimes to conduct ambushes.

Each tour of duty in South Vietnam was for 12 months. At the end of each year, the Troop was replaced by another Troop from 1 Ranger Squadron, NZSAS. The first Troop was commanded by Captain Terry Culley; this Troop was replaced in full in late 1969 by a Troop commanded by Captain Graye Shattky.

Members of this first replacement Troop took part in an operational Squadron parachute insertion on 15–16 December 1969 to provide further intelligence for Operation Marsden (29 November-28 December 1969) in which Australian and New Zealand forces launched attacks on the Communist stronghold in the Mây Tào Mountains which resulted in a major defeat for the Communists.

On 14 January 1970 Sergeant G.J. Campbell was killed in action, being the first and only fatal NZSAS casualty during the unit's time in Vietnam.

A new rotation of Australian SAS arrived on 18 February 1970. By this stage in the war, Vietcong activity in the province was decreasing due to the success of 1ATF operations. Consequently, SAS operations were limited to reconnaissance tasks around Nui Dat. At the same time, the task force commander temporarily repurposed 1ATF's Defence and Employment (D&E) Platoon to conduct LRRP intelligence-gathering patrols further afield. During March and April Australian and New Zealand SAS were sent out again to patrol the approaches to the Mây Tào Mountains and perform other Long-range reconnaissance patrols in Binh Tuy Province.

By 1970 the Vietcong had become familiar with SAS insertion techniques and would lay in wait after hearing the approaching helicopter. To counter this, SAS operations began using "cowboy insertions" involving a second helicopter following the first. Two patrols would therefore be inserted and would travel together for five minutes. The second patrol would then stop and wait another five minutes, while the first patrol continued its mission. If there was no contact with the enemy the second patrol would then return to the landing zone where it would be extracted.

At the end of August and during September 1970 the Australian and New Zealand SAS participated in Operations Cung Chung II and III.

The final rotation of New Zealand SAS occurred in late 1970, when the Troop was again replaced by a new body of men commanded by Second Lieutenant Jack Hayes.

It was a NZ patrol that made the last contact with enemy forces in this rotation of Australian and New Zealand SAS, killing two Viet Cong soldiers north-west of Thua Tich on 4 February 1971. 4 Troop was withdrawn from South Vietnam on 20 February 1971, as a part of the New Zealand Government's withdrawal policy. One more rotation of Australian SAS served in Vietnam before the complete withdrawal of Australian and New Zealand combat forces at the end of 1971.

The NZSAS did a total of 155 patrols in their 26 months of service in Vietnam with the loss of one KIA and four wounded.

=== Bougainville 1997–98 ===
From November 1997 to 15 February 1998, a 19-man troop sized detachment of NZSAS personnel were deployed as part of Operation BELISI, a peacekeeping operation in Bougainville. The troop was tasked with providing security, medium- to long-range communications and medical support. While the troopers were unarmed except for pepper spray, they were involved in a number of heated situations which required careful negotiation to defuse. The troopers also conducted 'hearts-and-minds' patrols, staying in local villages and developing relationships with leaders.

In addition, the NZSAS were involved in providing security and close protection to the various groups involved in peace negotiations that were held in New Zealand during 1998, including escorting the delegates from their home locations in Papua New Guinea, Bougainville and the Solomon Islands to New Zealand.

=== Kuwait 1998 ===
Twenty-four NZSAS personnel were deployed to Kuwait in February 1998 on Operation GRIFFIN during a period of international tension with Iraq, tasked with rescuing downed airmen in hostile territory in the event of a US-led aerial campaign. A smaller force replaced them in May 1998 for a further two-month tour. There were no missions into Iraq undertaken during the deployment, though it was considered a useful opportunity to practice mobile desert warfare skills, and to have contact with US Forces which had been limited since the United States suspended its ANZUS relations with New Zealand in 1986.

Once the NZSAS contingent was withdrawn, a New Zealand Coalition force liaison officer was maintained, with the position being commonly held by an NZSAS officer. On 12 March 2001, NZSAS Officer, Acting Major John McNutt was fulfilling this role when he was accidentally killed during a bombing demonstration. The position was withdrawn after this incident.

=== East Timor 1999–2001 ===
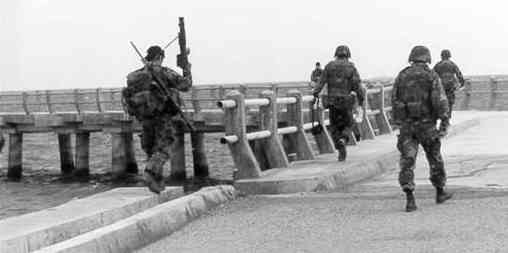
Escorting a U.S. military port survey team in East Timor in September 1999

In 1999 NZDF personnel were deployed to East Timor in response to a humanitarian and security crisis. The NZSAS deployed a Squadron sized contingent of 40 men under the command of (then) Major Peter Kelly, with two Troop Captains. On 9 September 1999, nine NZSAS personnel left New Zealand with an RNZAF C-130 aircraft, as the New Zealand Defence Force contribution to Operation DORIX, the evacuation of selected personnel from Dili, East Timor to Australia. Over 1500 personnel were evacuated during the operation under SASR and NZSAS protection.

On 20 September 1999 a 'Response Force' consisting of 3 Squadron SASR, NZSAS troopers and elements of the United Kingdom Special Boat Service, departed Darwin by Royal Australian Air Force transport. They were tasked with securing the airport, a seaport and a heli-port to enable regular forces to land and deploy. This was achieved without any shots being fired. The NZSAS patrols were then utilised to perform to a variety of tasks including direction-action, special reconnaissance and close protection missions. The NZSAS element departed East Timor for New Zealand on 14 December 1999.

Following the deaths of two members of the New Zealand Battalion Group in late June and early August 2000, combat tracking support was requested from the NZSAS. In August 2000, a Troop of about 12 NZSAS combat trackers were deployed with the task of locating militia who were crossing the border into East Timor. The Troops' efforts led to the successful placing of a number of ambushes, resulting in the deaths of three militia. In addition to performing combat tracking, on 6 September 2000, this Troop was utilised to conduct a permissive cross-border helicopter extraction operation of United Nations staff based at Atambua, West Timor. The Troop departed East Timor for New Zealand in January 2001.

=== Afghanistan 2001–2012 ===
==== Afghanistan 2001–2005 ====
On 11 December 2001, as a part of New Zealand's contribution to Operation Enduring Freedom, the NZSAS commenced Operation CONCORD. This deployment saw the NZSAS deploying a Squadron as a component of Task Force K-Bar to perform operations as part of the war on terrorism in Afghanistan. (Note: Although reported in some sources, the New Zealand SAS was not attached to the Australian SASR during this period, as each unit operated in different areas. While the Australians operated autonomously around Kandahar, the New Zealand SAS relied on logistic and command support provided by American units in Bagram.) The Squadron performed a variety of missions including special reconnaissance, direct action, close personal protection and sensitive site exploitation. Initially special reconnaissance patrols were performed on foot with insertion and extraction being conducted by helicopter in the high-altitude snow-covered areas of southern and central Afghanistan. Three NZSAS patrols were involved in this manner during Operation Anaconda in March 2002. In May 2002 the focus changed to mounted operations with patrols using modified American Humvees, supported by motorbikes to conduct 'long-range extended-duration patrols'. These patrols would often last 20 to 30 days and cover between 1000 and 2000 kilometres. Three six-month 'roulements' of between 40 and 65 soldiers from the NZSAS served in Afghanistan during this time, before the unit returned to New Zealand on 12 December 2002.

The NZSAS returned to Afghanistan in February 2004 on Operation CONCORD II in the lead up to the Afghanistan Presidential elections. Operations occurred in a number of provinces, utilising the same style of operations as the previous deployment. On 17 June 2004, two NZSAS soldiers were wounded in a pre-dawn gun-battle in central Afghanistan. In recognition of his actions during this engagement, SAS trooper Willie Apiata was awarded the Victoria Cross for New Zealand. The Squadron returned home in September 2004.

In 2005, with Afghan Parliamentary elections looming, Operation CONCORD III was conducted. The Squadron sized deployment was to utilise the NZSAS's newly delivered purchase of thirteen Pinzgauer Special Operations Vehicles. The deployment was originally scheduled to commence in March 2005; however, due to problems with the new vehicles, this deployment date slipped to June 2005. Again, the squadron performed long-range patrols as well as direct-action operations, before being withdrawn in November 2005.

Over the three CONCORD deployments to Afghanistan there were "casualties on both sides" during gun battles, with injuries also sustained as a result of vehicle crashes and striking mines or other unexploded ordnance but no New Zealanders were killed.

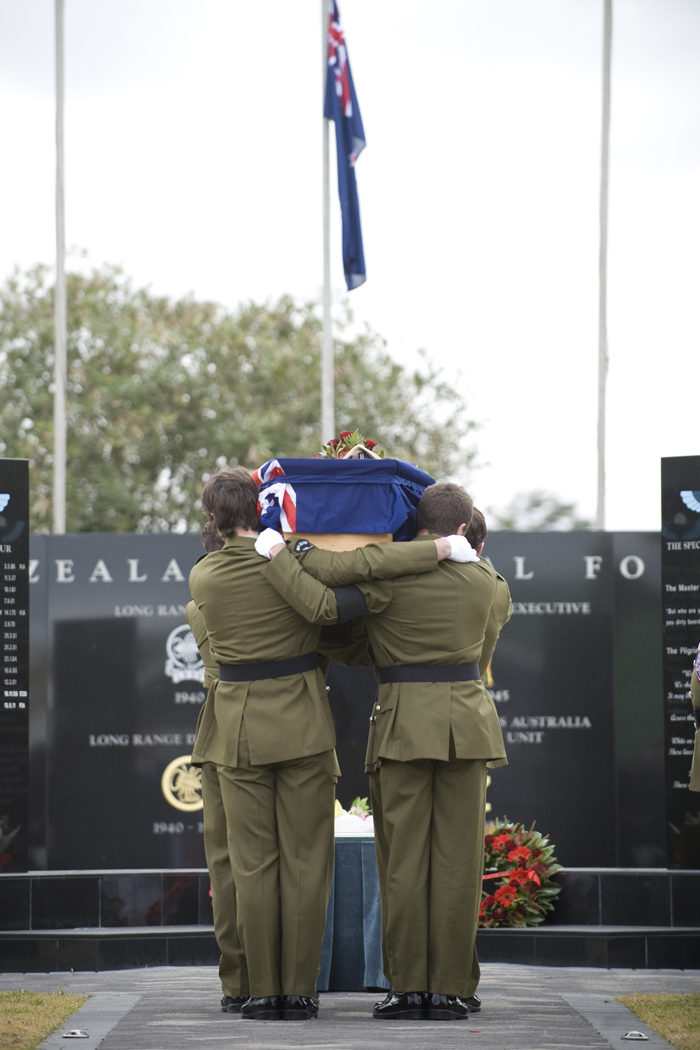
The casket of Corporal Douglas Grant at Papakura Army Camp

==== Afghanistan 2009–2012 ====
82 NZSAS and NZDF support personnel deployed to Afghanistan in September 2009, under Operation WĀTEA to form Task Force 81. This deployment was different from the unit's previous deployments to Afghanistan, as it was based in the capital city of Kabul, primarily to direct counter-insurgency operations in greater Kabul in cooperation with the Afghanistan Police's Crisis Response Unit (Task Force 24), which was operating under NZSAS mentorship. Originally the location of the deployment was not revealed publicly, however, its location was inadvertently revealed in the Norwegian press. Three rotations of troops were conducted to sustain the initial deployment, which was initially due to end in March 2011. However the mission was extended for a further year, although personnel numbers were reduced to 45.

As part of the mentoring activities, NZSAS personnel were among the forces which responded to the January 2010 attack in central Kabul. Two personnel, one of them Corporal "Steve" David Steven Askin, were injured during the terrorist attack against the Inter-Continental hotel in Kabul on 29 June 2011, where members of the NZSAS also provided 'helo sniping' support. Askin and one other serviceman involved at the Inter-Continental, Commander Jamie Pennell, were awarded the New Zealand Gallantry Star, the second-highest award after the Victoria Cross.

Two members of the unit were killed during the deployment while mentoring operations. On 19 August 2011, Corporal Douglas Grant was killed when responding to an attack on the British Council building in the centre of Kabul, where the NZSAS was required to utilise specialist entry capabilities and Lance Corporal Leon Smith was killed on 28 September 2011 during an operation in Wardak Province.

In January 2011, General David Petraeus announced that, since 2009, the NZSAS had made 60 "high-risk" arrests of suspected militants or Taliban leaders, seized 20 weapons caches, and foiled four attacks. He added that the unit had successfully executed more than 90% of its operations and raids without firing a shot. The unit was withdrawn from Afghanistan on 31 March 2012.

===== Operation Burnham war crimes allegations =====
On 21–22 August 2010, the NZSAS and members of the Afghan Crisis Response Unit participated in a military operation in Afghanistan's Tirgiran Valley known as Operation Burnham as part of the International Security Assistance Force. In March 2017, investigative journalists Nicky Hager and Jon Stephenson published a book on Operation Burnham Hit & Run: The New Zealand SAS in Afghanistan and the meaning of honour which alleged that NZSAS personnel had committed war crimes. The authors alleged that NZSAS personnel had attacked the Afghan villages of Naik and Khak Khuday Dad after Lieutenant Tim O'Donnell, 2/1 RNZIR part of the NZPRT, was killed by a roadside bomb.

The allegations of war crimes in Hit & Run generated considerable public and media interest in New Zealand, which generated calls for an independent inquiry. Despite initial denying that the raids had occurred in the two villages, the NZDF subsequently acknowledged that NZSAS forces had been present in one of those villages but asserted that claims of civilian casualties were "unfounded." On 11 April 2018, the Labour-led coalition government announced that the Government would be holding an inquiry into Operation Burnham and the allegations in Hit & Run.

==== 2021 Afghanistan evacuation ====
On 19 August 2021, the NZDF deployed a RNZAF C-130 aircraft to evacuate New Zealanders and other foreign nationals from Afghanistan under Operation Kõkako which involved approximately 80 NZDF personnel. NZSAS personnel, including the Female Engagement Team, guided evacuees safely through crowds outside the perimeter of Hamid Karzai International Airport in Kabul to perimeter entry points.

=== Other deployments and activities ===
Regular exchanges of personnel with foreign special forces units are conducted in order to build and maintain skills. This primarily occurs with the British Special Air Service and Special Boat Service the Australian Special Air Service and the 2nd Commando Regiment but has also included units from Canada, Thailand and Malaysia with NZSAS personnel often providing combat tracking training in return. In addition "a number" of individual NZSAS personnel have successfully served alongside other New Zealand soldiers on peacekeeping operations and in peace-monitoring roles, including the New Zealand Contingent attached to the Multinational Force and Observers in Sinai.

==== Training Malaysian Police Field Force personnel 1977–1980 ====
The New Zealand Military Attaché in Kuala Lumpur was alerted to the Malaysian Police Field Force's intention to raise a special forces unit. The NZSAS deployed a small training team, who were based at Ipoh and Sungai Pateni to assist with training the new unit. By rotating officers and non-commissioned officers, the NZSAS were able to sustain Operation RETURN ANGEL, for some two years until it reached a successful conclusion and the units were operational.

==== Rhodesia 1979–1980 ====
Seven individual NZSAS personnel deployed to Southern Rhodesia as part of the "New Zealand Army Truce Monitoring Contingent Rhodesia 1979–80" on Operation MIDFORD. The contingent also included a number of ex-NZSAS personnel and served in Rhodesia from 7 December 1979 to 10 March 1980.

==== Bosnia 1995–1996 ====
Initially a number of individual NZSAS personnel deployed as part of the infantry company that New Zealand contributed to the United Nations peacekeeping operation in Bosnia during the break-up of Yugoslavia. From the third rotation of this infantry company, a group of four NZSAS personnel deployed in a Close Personal Protection capacity, with three rotations occurring over approximately eighteen months.

==== Papua New Guinea tsunami 1998 ====
On 17 July an earthquake occurred off the northern coast of Papua New Guinea. The shock occurred on a reverse fault and led to a tsunami that caused significant destruction and a high number of deaths. In response to an international request for assistance, New Zealand dispatched a Royal New Zealand Air Force C-130 aircraft loaded with relief supplies and six NZSAS advanced medics. The short notice deployment of the medics helped preserve lives that otherwise might have been lost.

==== Solomon Islands 2000 ====
By June 2000, after several years of tension, the situation in the Solomon Islands had become unstable, resulting in the NZSAS being tasked with developing an evacuation plan for the New Zealand High Commission and its staff, as well as other New Zealanders in the Solomon Islands. A small NZSAS Troop was deployed on HMNZS Te Kaha, one of two Royal New Zealand Navy vessels that were stationed off the island. The Troop performed reconnaissance activities, however the situation calmed and the Troop was returned to New Zealand in July 2000.

==== Support to New Zealand Police ====
In 1964, NZSAS troopers were utilised to instruct early New Zealand Police Armed Offenders Squad members in field craft and weapon handling. This training relationship continued with the establishment of the Police Anti-Terrorist Squad (now known as the Special Tactics Group) and also included joint exercises. On 25 January 1968, David Maxwell Heron entered a farm house, murdered his brother-in-law and assaulted his brother-in-law's wife with a heavy object, before tying her up and fleeing. Five days after the incident armed NZSAS troopers joined the search for the suspect in a large area of swamp near Meremere, however Heron surrendered without incident the next day. During the Mount Eden Prison riots which occurred on 20–21 July 1965, the "battle trained" NZSAS troopers armed with automatic rifles with fixed bayonets, who "were prepared to shoot if necessary", were called to support police on the prison perimeter. The rioting prisoners eventually surrendered. Following the arrest of two of the French agents involved in the sinking of the ship Rainbow Warrior on 10 July 1985, the NZSAS were requested to support the New Zealand Police at an emergency holding prison established in Ardmore. The prison was used to hold Dominique Prieur, one of the arrested agents, due to concerns that French authorities might launch a rescue operation.

== Organisation ==
As at February 2013, the main elements of the 1st New Zealand Special Air Service Regiment were: (Note: In 2025, it was reported that Commando Squadron (D Squadron), part of the organisation in 2013, had been disbanded.)

- A Squadron (Sabre)
- B Squadron (Sabre)
- E Squadron (Explosive Ordnance Disposal)
- Support Squadron

=== A and B Squadrons ===
The two NZSAS Sabre Squadrons are combat units capable of conducting a wide range of Special Operations tasks. Each squadron is divided into four troops. The four troops specialise in four different areas: Amphibious, Air, Mobility and Mountain operations.

After completing the full NZSAS Regiment selection course, NZSAS candidates go on to undertake an intensive training cycle to build core skills. Those who complete the training cycle are accepted into the NZSAS and wear the sand beret with NZSAS badge and blue NZSAS stable belt. NZSAS operators then conduct further training to learn advanced special operations skills.

In 2026, The New Zealand Herald and The Post reported that B squadron was under half strength reduced to a few operators despite operators being offered a NZ$30,000 cash payment in 2024 to dissuade them from leaving the regiment. Both newspapers reported that the sabre squadrons had resumed responsibility for domestic counter terrorism after D squadron had been disbanded. Prior to D squadron's disbandment, the sabre squadrons were only responsible for offshore deployments.

==== Female Engagement Team ====
In 2017, the NZSAS established a six woman Female Engagement Team (FET) to provide support on operations with FET members able to engage with local women and adolescents in situations in which engagement with NZSAS male soldiers would be culturally unacceptable. The first FET selection course was held in November 2017 over three days with physical and mental assessments, and in January 2018, five successful candidates commenced a four month training course including gender issues, cultural knowledge and how to "move, shoot, communicate and medicate" to be able to work alongside sabre Squadron soldiers.

=== E Squadron – Explosive Ordnance Disposal ===
The 1st New Zealand Explosive Ordnance Disposal (EOD) Squadron is a specialist task unit within the NZSAS Regiment. It was established in August 2005 as an independent Force Troops Squadron, before coming under Operational Command of 1 NZSAS Regiment in July 2009. It provides support to the New Zealand police to "render safe" chemical, biological, radiological, nuclear and improvised explosive devices, commercial explosives and military munitions, domestically as well as overseas where New Zealand troops are operating. Personnel who serve in the squadron wear the sand beret with the EOD Squadron badge and stable belt. The Squadron badge includes the motto "Into Harm's Way". The Squadron is based at Trentham Military Camp, with Troops located in Auckland, Wellington and Christchurch.

=== Support Squadron ===
The Support Squadron is responsible for meeting the support needs of the NZSAS Regiment and includes logistics, intelligence, medical, administration and communications personnel. Personnel are given specific trade training upon joining the Regiment as well as having the opportunity to complete other specialist courses such as parachuting. Qualified Support Squadron personnel wear the sand beret with their corps badge.

=== D Squadron – Commando (reportedly disbanded) ===
The Counter Terrorist Tactical Assault Group (CTTAG) was formed on 5 December 2005, after the NZSAS struggled to cover both deployments to Afghanistan and fulfil its counter terrorism role. On 5 December 2009, the CTTAG was renamed D Squadron (Commando). The commandos wore the sand coloured beret with the 'trinity' badge and its motto was "Ready to Strike". Selection for the squadron was four to five days long after which 16 weeks of training was completed. Their training included maritime counter terrorism.

In May 2025, The New Zealand Herald reported that the NZDF had quietly shelved D Squadron around two years earlier, citing attrition as the primary reason. Attrition has reportedly eaten into NZSAS numbers and those in its feeder units, leading to a sharp drop in experience and personnel. The NZDF refused to answer questions from the The New Zealand Herald about whether D Squadron still existed. Commandos were reportedly given the option of either attempting full NZSAS selection to enter sabre squadrons or returning to their unit.

== Selection ==
To join the NZSAS Regiment, New Zealand Army, Navy, or Air Force personnel must pass a selection course, with the course varying depending on the role they seek within the Regiment. In 2011 the selection course was also opened to civilians; they spend two days preparing for the selection course learning military skills considered necessary to compete safely against military applicants. In 2007, a four part documentary NZSAS: First Among Equals was produced on the selection course and training.

=== Special Air Service ===
The NZSAS selection standard remains the same, with the full course aiming to identify "self-disciplined individuals who are capable of working effectively as part of a small group under stressful conditions for long periods of time". However, the earlier phases of the selection course have been opened up to candidates who wish to join the Regiment as a Commando. This is described as advancing through a series of 'gates'.

- Gate 1: After four days, the first gate is reached, which allows a candidate to be considered for completing "1 NZSAS Regt fitness testing and mixed terrain navigation".
- Gate 2: Gate 2 is reached after nine days and is the conclusion of the selection course. This phase involves completing "close country navigation and other activities," and those who get to this point are considered for NZSAS training. Those who are selected go on to complete an intensive period of training to build core special forces skills. On average, 10–15% of candidates pass both selection and cycle training.
- NZSAS commissioned Officer candidates also undergo an additional two days of selection to test their suitability to solve problems when tired and under pressure.

=== Support / Explosive Ordnance Disposal ===
All support and EOD personnel who wish to join the NZSAS Regiment must complete a ten-day 'Special Operations Forces Induction Course. This involves completing a revised version of the first two days of NZSAS Selection. Given the nature of their roles, support and EOD candidates are given more time to complete the activities than NZSAS candidates and are provided with normal sleep and food intake. The course also "provides familiarisation with specialist weapons and equipment, and educates personnel on the ethos and values of the Unit".

== Equipment ==
Soldiers are armed with a variety of weapons systems, including the Barrett MRAD sniper rifle and the Barrett M107A1 anti-materiel rifle.

In 2017, the Thales Bushmaster Protected Mobility Vehicle entered service with five surplus Bushmasters purchased from the Australian Defence Force for direct action designated Protected Heavy. In 2018, an undisclosed number of Supacat HMT Extenda vehicles entered service replacing the Pinzgauer for special reconnaissance designated Mobility Heavy. An undisclosed number of two modified civilian vehicle types also entered service in 2018. The vehicles for terrorism and support and influence are designated Low Profile Utility and Low Profile Protected and were supplied by Jankel Armouring.

== Honours and awards ==
=== Malaya ===
==== Honours ====
- Military Cross: Lieutenant Ian Burrows, Major Frank Rennie.
- Mention in Dispatches: Lieutenant Earle Watson Yandall, Major Frank Rennie, Captain Graham Neil McLaren Boswell, Lieutenant John Airth Mace.
- British Empire Medal: Trooper Stephen Colin Watene.

==== Malaysian awards ====
- Negri Sembilan Conspicuous Gallantry Medal: Lieutenant Ian Burrows, Lieutenant Earle Watson Yandall.
- Negri Sembilan Distinguished Conduct Medal: Trooper Grey Otene, Lance Corporal Robert Percy Withers, Lance Corporal Raymond Stennett Hurle.

=== Borneo ===
==== Honours ====
- Military Cross: Lieutenant Eru Ihaka Manuera.
- Mention in Dispatches: Corporal Niwa Kawha, Temporary Sergeant Kenneth Michael Schimanski.

=== Afghanistan ===
==== Victoria Cross ====
It was announced on 2 July 2007 that Corporal Willie Apiata of the NZSAS had been awarded the Victoria Cross for New Zealand for carrying a severely injured comrade 70 metres "under heavy fire" from machine-guns, Rocket Propelled Grenades (RPGs) and grenades after their vehicle was destroyed in an ambush and then joined the rest of his comrades in a counter-attack.

==== Other Honours ====
When announced, some names of personnel were withheld for security reasons.

- New Zealand Gallantry Decoration: Captain Craig Wilson (listed as Captain 'C' when announced), Corporal 'B', Lance Corporal Leon Kristopher Smith.
- New Zealand Gallantry Medal: Corporal 'R'.

In July 2012, Smith was also posthumously awarded the Charles Upham Bravery Award, performing in the opinion of the Upham trust, the most outstanding act of heroism during the two previous years.

==== United States awards ====
- Silver Star: unnamed 'non-badged' medic.
- Defense Meritorious Service Medal: Lieutenant Colonel Christopher John Parsons.
- United States Army Commendation Medal: Colonel Karl Cummins

===== Presidential Unit Citation =====
At a ceremony held at the Marine Corps Air Station, Miramar, California on 7 December 2004, the United States Navy Presidential Unit Citation was awarded to the NZSAS and the other units that comprised the Combined Joint Special Operations Task Force-SOUTH/Task Force K-BAR between 17 October 2001 and 30 March 2002. It was awarded for "extraordinary heroism and outstanding performance of duty in action" and noted that those awarded established "benchmark standard of professionalism, tenacity, courage, tactical brilliance, and operational brilliance, and operational excellence while demonstrating superb esprit de corps and maintaining the highest measures of combat readiness."

=== New Year and Birthday honours ===
In addition, a number of awards have been made for services while posted to the NZSAS in the New Year and the Queen's Birthday Honours lists. (Note: As the NZSAS official history withheld names of some personnel, unless they are otherwise publicly identified as being associated with the NZSAS, they have also been redacted in this list.)

- Officer of the New Zealand Order of Merit: Acting Lieutenant Colonel James William Blackwell, Acting Lieutenant Colonel R.M. (2005), Acting Lieutenant Colonel R.G. (2006).
- Member of the Order of the British Empire: Captain Lenard Donald Grant, Major Neville Sutcliffe Kidd, Captain Paul Tekatene Andrew, Major Derek Graye Shattky, Acting Warrant Officer Class One Kevin R. Herewini, Captain Kenneth Edward McKee Wright, Warrant Officer Class One Busby Otene, Captain William John Lillicrapp.
- Member of the New Zealand Order of Merit: Corporal David Alexander Ryan, Captain Christopher John Parsons, Corporal J. (2000), Major Peter Te Aroha Emile Kelly, Sergeant T. (2002), Staff Sergeant Adrian Garry Vogt, Staff Sergeant G. (2003), Major R. (2006), Staff Sergeant Troy Elliott Perano.
- British Empire Medal: Sergeant Eric Ball, Lance Corporal Niwa Kawha, Staff Sergeant Henry Keith Handley, Sergeant Peihopa Brown, Temporary Warrant Officer Class Two Daniel Wilfred Wilson, Temporary Staff Sergeant Frederic Donald Barclay, Sergeant Joseph Johnston, Sergeant Maurice Edwards, Sergeant Michael Anthony Cunningham, Warrant Officer Class Two Whi (Note: Whi Wanoa's name at the time of award was misspelt phonetically as Phee,) Wanoa, Staff Sergeant Benjamin Ngapo, Staff Sergeant Victor Kawana Timu, Lance Corporal Earle Alexander John Henry, Sergeant John Howard Joseph Ward, Staff Sergeant Sotia Ponijasi, Staff Sergeant Patrick Anthony Tracey.
- New Zealand Distinguished Service Decoration: Lieutenant Colonel Christopher John Parsons, Major Brent John Quin.

== Notable members ==
- Frank Rennie CBE, MC – was a career soldier in the New Zealand Army, holding every rank between private and colonel, and founder of the New Zealand Special Air Service
- Willie Apiata VC – first (and currently the only) recipient of the Victoria Cross for New Zealand.
- Pat "Shocker" Shaw – a founding member of the Armed Offenders Squad
- Niwa Kawha – served with NZSAS during the Borneo Confrontation and received the British Empire Medal for his service
- Barrie "Baz" Rice – star of Treasure Island: Extreme.
- Jerry Mateparae – the 20th Governor-General of New Zealand, who joined the Army as a Private and ended his service as a Lieutenant General and Chief of Defence Force
- Martyn Dunne – Former NZSAS Squadron Commander, who went on to later become a General in the New Zealand Army
- Mike Coburn (pseudonym) – later joined 22 SAS, was a member of the much publicised Bravo Two Zero patrol and authored the book Soldier Five
- John Mace – served with the NZSAS Squadron in the Malayan Emergency, would later become the Chief of the General Staff, from 1984 to 1987, and then as Chief of Defence Staff from 1987 until his retirement in 1991.
- Steve Askin – Former NZSAS soldier who was killed in a helicopter crash fighting the 2017 Port Hills fires.
- Karl Cummins – Former NZSAS Commanding Officer and Deputy Director of Special Operations during Operation Burnham.
- Leon Kristopher Smith – posthumously awarded the New Zealand Gallantry Decoration and the Charles Upham Bravery Award for his actions when attempting to resuscitate a mortally wounded colleague
- Mac McCallion – was a member of the secret Faceless 26 Ghost Unit serving in Vietnam. Later became a rugby union player and coach
- Ian Burrows – served with the NZSAS in Malaya in 1955 as one of the "originals" before going on to be appointed as Commander of Land Forces New Zealand in 1981. One of his sons, Jamie, also served in the NZSAS

=== Other people involved with NZSAS ===
- Ron Mark – 40th Minister of Defence passed selection but was refused entry into the NZSAS
- Wilson Whineray – Honorary Colonel Commandant from 1997 to 2001.

== Alliances ==
- United Kingdom – Special Air Service

== Memorial ==
The regimental memorial, known as the "Granite Parachute", is at Rennie Lines, Papakura Military Camp. Inscribed upon it is an extract from the poem The Golden Road to Samarkand by James Elroy Flecker:

We are the Pilgrims, master; we shall go
Always a little further: it may be
Beyond that last blue mountain barred with snow
Across that angry or that glimmering sea...

This is the same inscription as on the British Special Air Service's memorial.

== Order of precedence ==
Preceded by Royal New Zealand Infantry Regiment	New Zealand Army Order of Precedence	Succeeded by New Zealand Intelligence Corps

== Notes ==
Footnotes

Citations
