= New Zealand Gallantry Decoration =

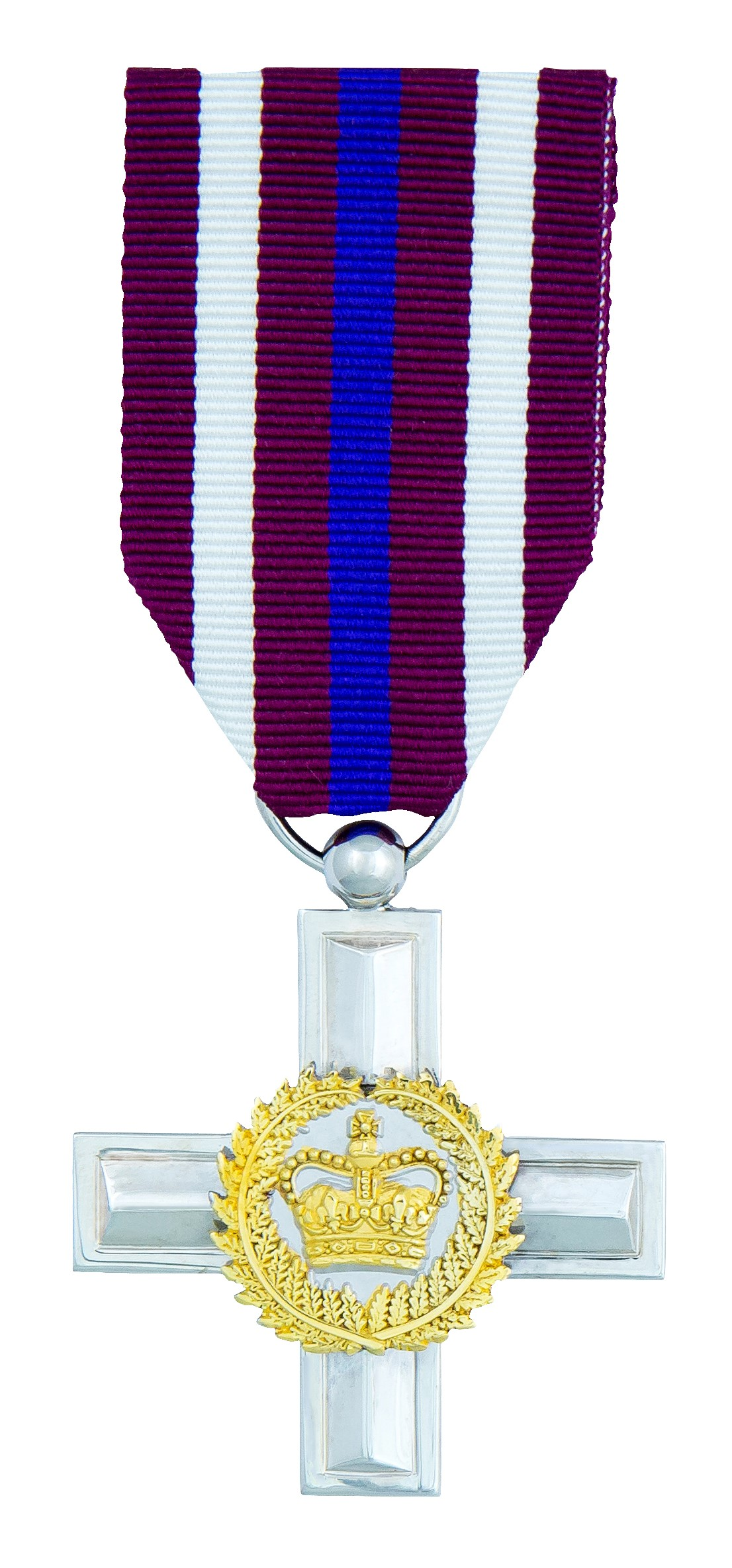
- Obverse of the medal
- Type: Military decoration
- Awarded for: "acts of exceptional gallantry in situations of danger" while involved in war and warlike operational service (including peacekeeping)
- Description: 46 mm, (obverse) faceted silver cross surmounted by the Royal Crown and fern frond wreath emblem; (reverse) inscribed "FOR GALLANTRY - MO TE TOANGA". With ring suspension.
- Presented by: New Zealand
- Eligibility: New Zealand and allied forces
- Status: Currently awarded
- Established: 20 September 1999
- Founder: Elizabeth II

Highlights
- Total: 12
- Ribbon: 32 mm, seven narrow vertical stripes of crimson, white, crimson, purple, crimson, white, and crimson

Precedence
- Next (higher): Member of the New Zealand Order of Merit
- Next (lower): New Zealand Bravery Decoration

The New Zealand Gallantry Decoration (NZGD) is the third level military decoration of the New Zealand armed forces.

It was instituted by Royal Warrant on 20 September 1999 as part of the new indigenous New Zealand Gallantry system. The medal, which may be awarded posthumously, is granted in recognition of 'acts of exceptional gallantry in situations of danger' while involved in war and warlike operational service (including peacekeeping).

Bars are awarded to the NZGS in recognition of the performance of further acts of gallantry meriting the award. Recipients are entitled to the postnominal letters "N.Z.G.D.".

This medal replaced the award of the Distinguished Service Cross, Military Cross, Distinguished Flying Cross, Air Force Cross, Distinguished Service Medal, Military Medal, Distinguished Flying Medal, and Air Force Medal.

== Recipients ==
Name	Rank	Unit	Campaign	Date of action
John Clinton Lionel Oxenham	Chief petty officer	Royal New Zealand Navy	United Nations Mission in Cambodia	1–4 December 1992
John Charles Dyer	Lieutenant colonel	Royal Regiment of New Zealand Artillery	United Nations Mission in Sierra Leone	6 January 1999
Logan Charles Cudby	Squadron leader	Royal New Zealand Air Force	United Nations Mission in East Timor	June–September 1999
Phillip Murray Cheater	Private	Royal New Zealand Infantry Regiment	United Nations Mission in East Timor	24 July 2000
B	Corporal	New Zealand Special Air Service	War in Afghanistan (2001–2021)	2004
C	Captain	New Zealand Special Air Service	War in Afghanistan (2001–2021)	2004
Allister Donald Baker	Lance corporal	Royal New Zealand Infantry Regiment	War in Afghanistan (2001–2021)	3 August 2010
Matthew John Ball	Corporal	Royal New Zealand Corps of Signals	War in Afghanistan (2001–2021)	3 August 2010
H	Undisclosed	New Zealand Special Air Service	War in Afghanistan (2001–2021)	2011
W	Undisclosed	New Zealand Special Air Service	War in Afghanistan (2001–2021)	2011
Leon Kristopher Smith	Lance corporal	New Zealand Special Air Service	War in Afghanistan (2001–2021)	19 August 2011
David John Duncan	Sergeant	Royal New Zealand Armoured Corps	War in Afghanistan (2001–2021)	4 August 2012

== See also ==
- Orders, decorations, and medals of New Zealand
- New Zealand gallantry awards
- New Zealand bravery awards
- New Zealand campaign medals
