= Operation Burnham =

2010 military operation in Afghanistan

- Part of the War in Afghanistan
Date	21–22 August 2010
Location	Tirgiran Valley, Afghanistan
Result	Failure to capture Taliban targets

Belligerents
New Zealand; Afghanistan; United States	Taliban

Strength
(New Zealand) 60-70 NZSAS (Islamic Republic of Afghanistan) Afghan Crisis Response Unit (United States) 3 or more helicopters	Unknown

Casualties and losses
1 NZSAS injured	Unknown

Operation Burnham was a joint military operation undertaken by the New Zealand Special Air Service and elements of the Afghan Crisis Response Unit and International Security Assistance Force in Afghanistan's Tirgiran Valley on 21–22 August 2010. Operation Burnham became the subject of the investigative journalists Nicky Hager and Jon Stephenson's book Hit & Run: The New Zealand SAS in Afghanistan and the meaning of honour, which alleged that New Zealand forces had committed war crimes against civilians in the Naik and Khak Khudday Dad villages.

Though the New Zealand Defence Force initially denied that the operation had occurred in those villages, they subsequently confirmed that NZSAS forces had entered one of the villages mentioned in the book. Media and public interest led to calls for an official inquiry, which was rejected by the-then Prime Minister Bill English. In April 2018, Attorney-General David Parker of the Labour-led coalition government announced that the Government would be holding an inquiry into Operation Burnham and the allegations in Hit & Run. In December 2018, the New Zealand Government confirmed that they would be holding an inquiry but that it would be held behind closed doors.

In mid–June 2019, the Afghan villagers withdrew from the Operation Burnham inquiry, with their lawyer Deborah Manning citing that they had become disillusioned with the inquiry process. In September 2019, the former Defence Force chief Sir Jerry Mateparae admitted that the Defence Force's briefings to the-then Defence Minister Jonathan Coleman had been inaccurate but denied that the military had engaged in a cover-up. The Burnham Inquiry's report was released in late July 2020. While acknowledging that five people including a child had been killed during Operation Burnham, the report concluded that the NZ Defence Force had not covered up casualties and had abided by the rules of engagement and international law.

== Background ==
A map of Afghanistan showing Bamiyan province's location.

=== New Zealand military involvement in Afghanistan ===
During the War in Afghanistan, elements of the New Zealand Defence Force were deployed to Afghanistan's Bamyan Province in September 2003 as part of the New Zealand Provincial Reconstruction Team and remained there until 2012. The New Zealand PRT provided regular military patrols across the province, advised and supported the provincial governor, and participated in developmental projects. In addition, the elite New Zealand Special Air Service (NZSAS) saw action during the United States–led invasion of Afghanistan between December 2001 and November 2005.

According to the investigative journalists Nicky Hager and Jon Stephenson, the New Zealand provincial reconstruction team also gathered intelligence about groups and elements who were hostile to the International Security Assistance Force including the Taliban insurgency. While Bamyan province was relatively quiet during the early 2000s, New Zealand forces encountered a string of attacks from 2008 onwards including, roadside bombs in March and November 2008, and an ambush involving guns and rocket-propelled grenades in June 2009. Between September 2009 and 31 March 2012, the NZSAS was deployed as part of counterinsurgency operations in the greater Kabul region in support of the Afghan Interior Ministry's Crisis Response Unit (Task Force 24). During their second deployment, NZSAS forces operated from Camp Warehouse, a military base on the eastern outskirts of Kabul.

On 3 August 2010, Lieutenant Tim O'Donnell of the Bamyan provincial reconstruction team was killed by a roadside bomb while his unit was traveling through Karimak village. While there had been similar attacks in the previous two years, this one had resulted in the first New Zealand combat death in the Afghanistan War. According to Hager and Stephenson, O'Donnell's death generated an outpouring of grief, anger, and desire for retribution among New Zealand military personnel stationed in Afghanistan. As a result, New Zealand forces decided to hunt down the perpetrators behind O'Donnell's murder.

=== Operational planning ===
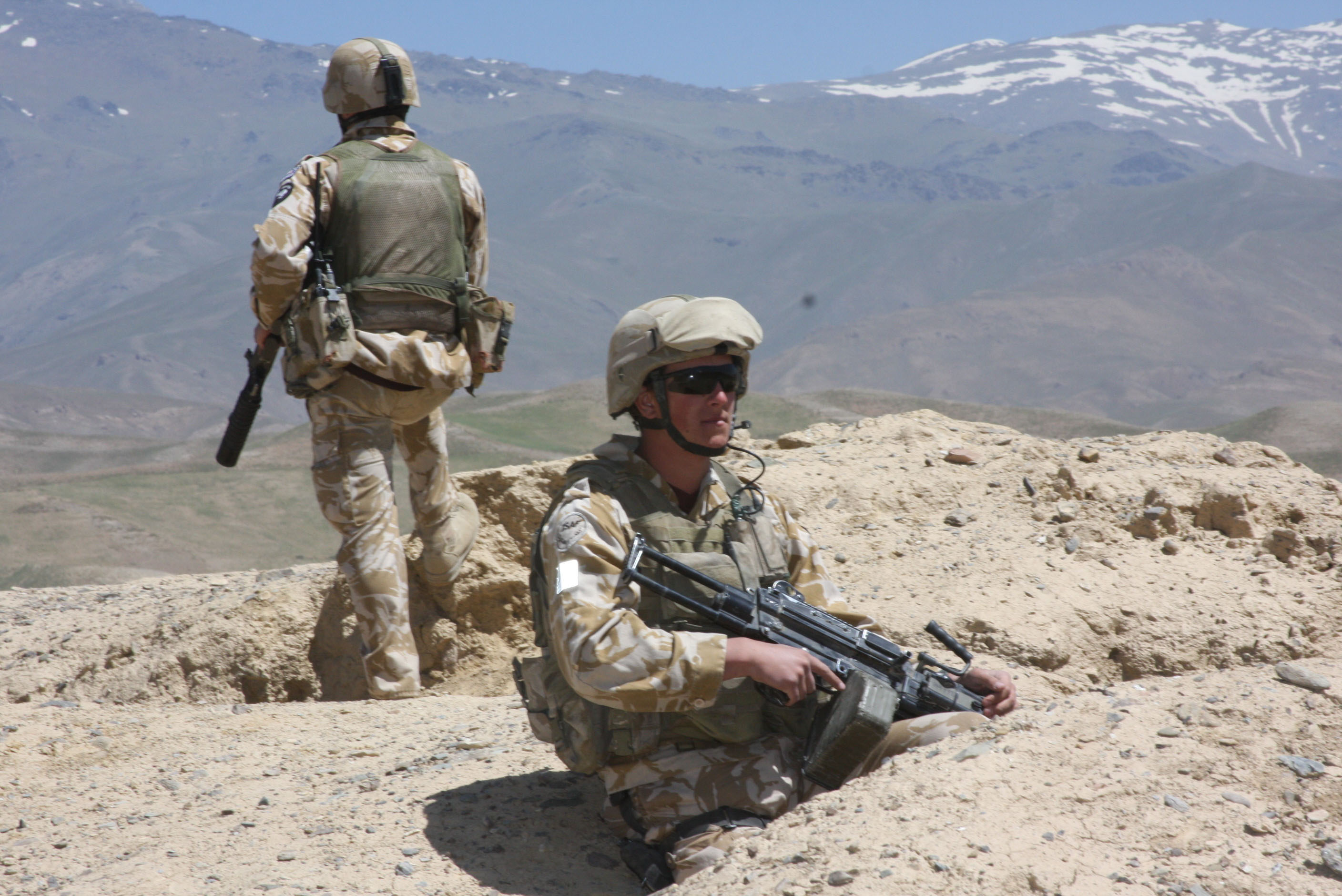
Two members of the NZ Provincial Reconstruction Team in Bamiyan province in July 2009

According to Hager and Stephenson, New Zealand Defence Force and New Zealand Security Intelligence Service (NZSIS) intelligence officers used a mixture of local Afghan informants and an electronic eavesdropping station at Kiwi Base in Bamyan to gather intelligence on a list of nine suspected "Mujahideen" fighters: Maulawi Naimatullah, Qari Miraj, Abdullah Kalta, Qari Musa, Maulawi Alawuddin, Maulawi Anwar, Abdul Ghafar, Islmuddin, and Qari Latif. Three of the insurgents—Maulawi Naimatullah, Abdullah Kalta, and Maulawi Anwar—came from Naik village in the Tirgiran Valley. A fourth insurgent, Abdul Ghafar, came from Khak Khuday Dad village in the Tirgiran valley. NZSAS officers lobbied the United States military authorities to add these Afghan fighters to the Joint Prioritized Effects List, a capture or kill list for coalition personnel based in Afghanistan.

Planning for Operation Burnham took place during the first weeks of August 2010. The NZSAS's Afghan partners, the Crisis Response Unit, were briefed about the operation but were not informed about the destinations being targeted. According to Hager and Stephenson, the Chief of the NZDF Lieutenant-General Jerry Mateparae and the Defence Minister Wayne Mapp visited the NZSAS base Camp Warehouse during that period and were privy to the final stages of the preparations for Operation Burnham. Mapp and Mateparae also briefed Prime Minister John Key about the planned operation by telephone. The authors have asserted that the Prime Minister gave approval for Operation Burnham to go ahead. Lieutenant-General Mateparae and NZSAS senior officers also watched a live video of Operation Burnham. In addition, the NZSAS lobbied for a US surveillance plane to conduct a surveillance flight over the Tirgiran valley prior to Operation Burnham. They also made arrangements for US Apache helicopter gunships to provide aerial support during the raids.

According to Hager and Stephenson, Operation Burnham followed the blueprint used for many special forces operations in Afghanistan. The raid would involve encircling the target location with troops, including spotters and snipers on high lookouts, and then sending assault teams to storm the buildings in order to capture or kill the targets. Anyone who tried to escape would be picked off by the surrounding snipers or by Apache helicopter gunships. Operation Burnham's targets were the three insurgents: Maulawi Naimatullah and Abdullah Kalta of Naik; and Abdul Ghafar of Khak Khuday Dad. The authors speculated that the raid was named after Burnham Camp near Christchurch, where Lieutenant O'Donnell had been based.

== The raid ==
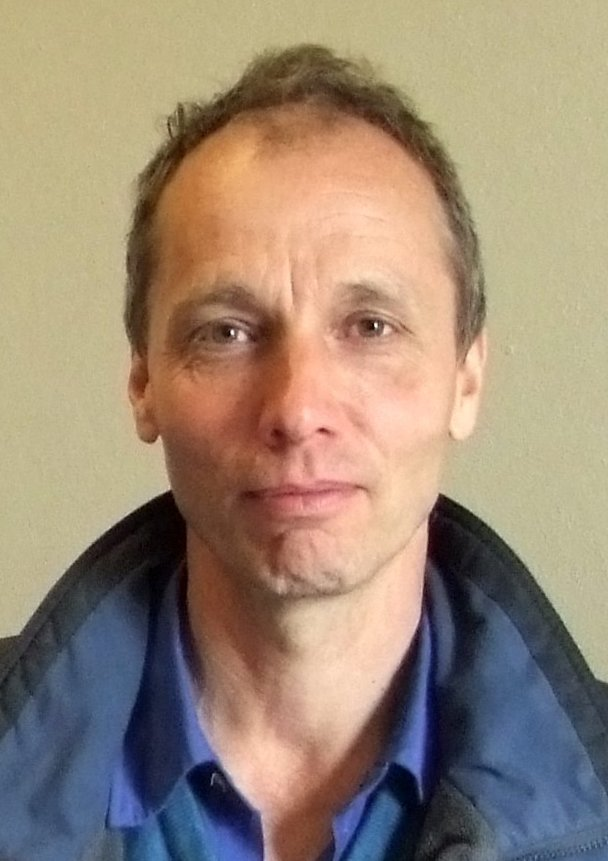
Nicky Hager, one of the co-authors of the book Hit and Run.

=== Hager and Stephenson's version ===
Hager and Stephenson's version of the events of Operation Burnham is covered in the third chapter of their 2017 book Hit & Run. On the evening 21 August 2010, 60–70 NZSAS and Afghan CRU troops traveled in two US Chinook helicopters from Camp Warehouse to Kiwi Base in Bamyan province. After midnight, the two helicopters flew to the Tirgiran Valley; with one heading to Naik and the other heading to Khak Khuday Dad. In addition, a third US Blackhawk helicopter, carrying NZSAS troops, arrived in the Tirgiran Valley as the advanced guard. According to interviews of former NZSAS and CRU personnel by Hager and Stephenson, most of the personnel involved in Operation Burnham were NZSAS personnel with the Afghan personnel being there for back up and to provide an "Afghan face" to the operation, so that it could be officially claimed that the raid was a joint Afghan and coalition operation.

Around 12:30 am on 22 August, the Blackhawk helicopter landed several NZSAS sniper teams near Khak Khuday Dad and Naik villages, which moved to their lookout points. About 1 am, the first Chinook helicopter arrived at Khak Khuday Dan and landed its assault force. The NZSAS and CRU troops reportedly exchanged fire with individuals believed to be insurgents. Shortly later, Apache gunships bombarded the village's buildings. According to Hager and Stephenson, the NZSAS and CRU commandos did not attempt to stop the attack. They also did not search the houses or check if any of the inhabitants needed assistance. Instead, they received orders by radio to travel to the next target Naik.

Shortly after 1 am, the second Chinook landed at the edge of Naik village. The NZSAS and CRU troops were divided into assault teams consisting of five to ten persons who were dispatched to different targets in the village. The assault teams assigned to Abdullah Kalta and Maulawi Naimatullah's houses found that their targets had escaped. Unable to capture or eliminate the targets, the NZSAS commandos instead destroyed the insurgents' houses and the home of Naimatullah's father, who reportedly disapproved of his son's involvement in the Taliban. The NZSAS troops found only civilians including elderly people, women, and children in the remaining houses in the village. NZSAS forces also seized some ammunition including bullets and rocket-propelled grenades and later destroyed the building they were being housed in. According to Hager and Stephenson, the insurgents had already retreated to the high pastures, following a long-standing Mujaheddin practice dating back to the Soviet–Afghan War of retreating to the mountains following hit-and-run attacks on Soviet forces.

Following the ground assault, US Apache helicopters strafed Naik village. Hager and Stephenson have asserted that the NZSAS troops had called the helicopters in despite knowing that there were no insurgents in the village and suggest that the commandos were motivated by a desire to avenge O'Donnell's death. One of the NZSAS commandos was reportedly wounded seriously when a wall hit by an Apache rocket collapsed on him. The wounded NZSAS commando was evacuated by his comrades aboard the Blackhawk helicopter. Two men fleeing Naik village were also shot down by an Apache helicopter. According to Hager and Stephenson, the Afghan CRU commandos encountered wounded civilians from Khak Khuday Dan and provided medical assistance. However, the NZSAS troops did not attempt to render medical assistance to the civilians. About two hours after 1 am, the NZSAS and CRU troops evacuated aboard their helicopters and returned to Camp Warehouse in Kabul.

=== NZDF version ===
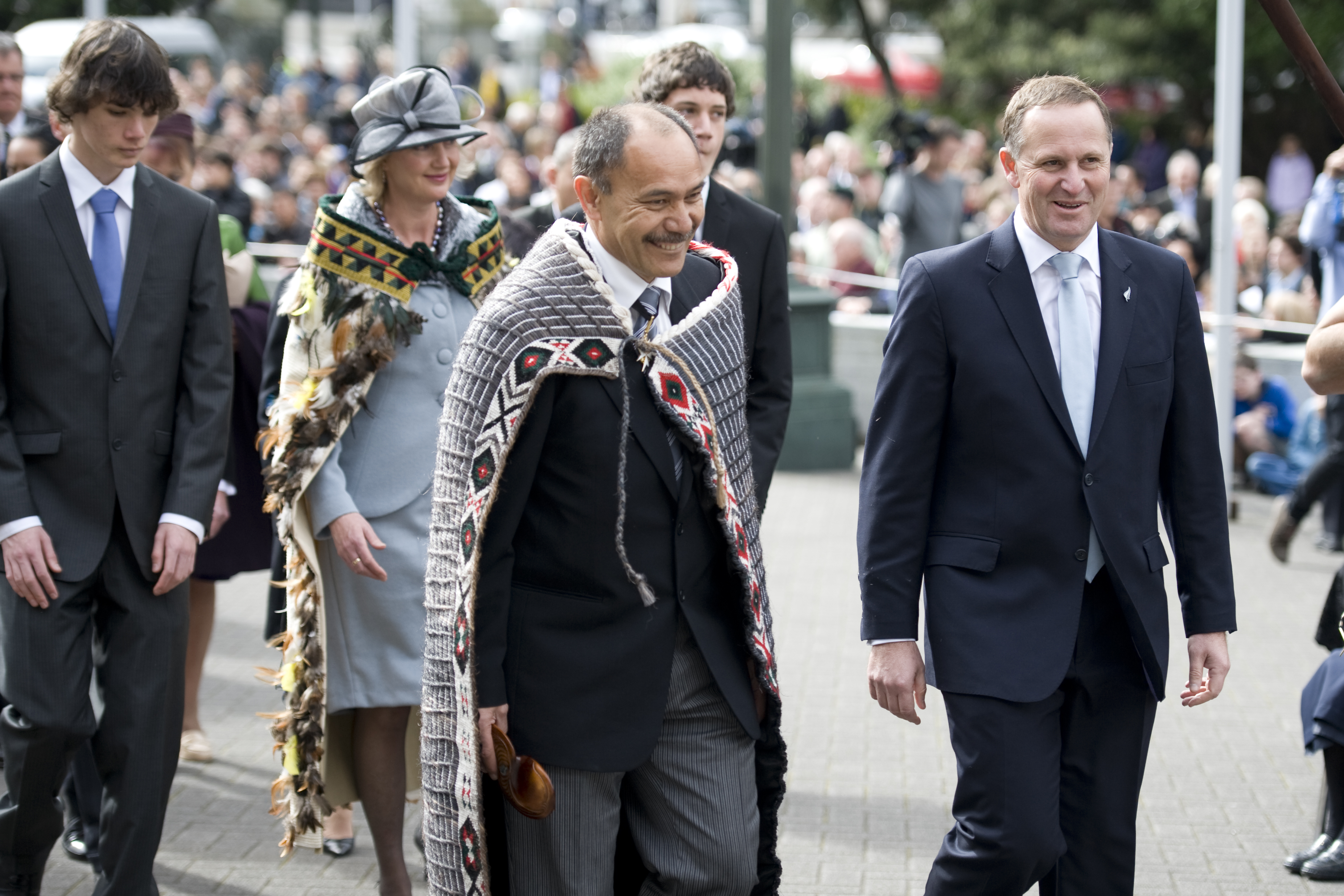
Lieutenant general Jerry Mateparae briefed Prime Minister John Key about the planning for Operation Burnham.

In response to further Official Information Act requests by The New Zealand Herald newspaper and other media, the New Zealand Defence Force released an info pack outlining the NZDF's official account of the events of Operation Burnham on 14 March 2018. The NZDF claimed that Operation Burnham had taken place at Tirgiran village instead of Naik and Khak Khuday Dad as claimed by Hager and Stephenson. At 0030 on 22 August 2010, two helicopters carrying NZSAS and Afghan Crisis Response Unit personnel had landed on the outskirts of Tirgiran village under covering fire provided by Coalition aircraft.

According to the NZDF report, the Coalition aircraft soon detected several armed insurgents taking up positions on high ground and within Tirgiran village which were deemed a threat to Coalition helicopters and ground forces. At 0054, the targets were identified as direct participants in the hostilities and coalition aircraft were given permission to engage the insurgents. Those engagements took place in an area southwest of the landing zone. The NZDF report noted that rounds from a Coalition aircraft had missed their target and struck two buildings. The report speculated that civilian casualties may have resulted from these rounds hitting the two buildings.

The NZDF report asserted that the Coalition forces had made a "callout" to the villagers through an interpreter informing them of their presence and general intention. The report also acknowledged that Coalition forces had entered a residence in Tirgiran Village. NZDF eventually agreed, 352 days after first claiming that "NZDF troops never operated in the two villages identified in the book. Though Coalition forces had failed to capture the insurgent "targeted for capture", they managed to seize a significant cache of weapons including one rocket-propelled grenade launcher, a bipod, five rocket propelled grenade rocket motor, several rounds of ammunition and magazines, a leather pistol holster, and an AK-47 assault rifle. The NZDF report also claimed that NZSAS forces had shot an individual subsequently identified as an insurgent.

The NZDF report also denied Hager and Stephenson's claims that NZDF forces had destroyed a house in Tirgiran village, deliberately set fire to houses or any personal possessions, and call in Coalition aircraft to deliberately destroy houses. As Coalition forces withdrew, the Afghan interpreter had addressed the village by loud-hailer. An ISAF information pamphlet was also circulated and the ground forces were airlifted out by 0345. The NZDF report claimed that one house had caught fire when debris from the destruction of the insurgents' weapons and ammunition had fallen on the roof, setting the highly combustible roofing material alight. The NZDF report also claimed that a second house had been destroyed by an unattended cooking fire.

The NZDF report acknowledged that one NZSAS soldier had been injured when a wall and part of a roof had fallen on him while entering the building. However, it disputed Hager and Stephenson's claim that the injury was the result of the house wall falling after being deliberately damaged by Coalition aircraft fire. At approximately 0245, the NZSAS casualty was evacuated from Tirgiran village by helicopter. While the NZDF report emphasized that NZSAS personnel were unaware of civilian casualties during the course of operation, it stated that a joint ISAF-Afghan government investigation had attributed civilian casualties to a gunsight malfunction, which had caused the rounds to miss their target and strike two buildings.

== Casualties ==
The NZSAS-led strike team only sustained one casualty when a commando nicknamed "Mo" was wounded by falling debris from a collapsed wall. He was reportedly evacuated to the United States Air Force military hospital at Ramstein Air Base in Germany and was later awarded a medal.

According to an Independent Directorate of Local Governance document cited by Hager and Stephenson, six Afghan villagers were killed during Operation Burnham on 22 August 2010; with two of the deceased being killed in the outskirts of Naik village. The dead included a three-year-old girl named Fatima, the daughter of Khadija and Abdul Khaliq, who was killed by shrapnel from helicopter fire. In addition, fifteen villagers were wounded in Khak Khuday Dad village by either shrapnel or bullet wounds.

A total of twelve houses were destroyed during Operation Burnham; with six being in Khak Khuday Dad and the remaining six being in Naik village.

=== Fatalities ===
The six Afghan civilians killed were:

Name	Age	Village	Occupation	Notes
Abdul Qayoom	Unknown	Khak Khuday Dad	Farmer	Left behind a wife and four children
Abdul Faqir	27 years old	Khak Khuday Dad	Farmer	Killed by shrapnel
Fatima	3 years old	Khak Khuday Dad	Nil	Killed by shrapnel
Mohammad Iqbal	55 years old	Naik	Farmer	Killed by bullets from Apache gunships; father of Maulawi Naimatullah
Abdul Qayoom	Teens or early twenties	Naik	Farmer	Bullet wounds; son of Mohammad Iqbal
Islamuddin	Unknown	Khak Khuday Dad	School teacher	Bullet wounds

=== Wounded ===
The fifteen wounded Afghan civilians were:

Name	Age	Village	Occupation	Notes
Bibi Khadija	Unknown	Khak Khuday Dad	Mother	Wounded by helicopter shrapnel
Abdullah	7 years old	Khak Khuday Dad	Nil	Son of Abdul and Khadija Khaliq
Bibi Hanifa	4 years old	Khak Khuday Dad	Nil	Daughter of Abdul and Khadija Khadija
Bibi Zuhra	28 years old	Khak Khuday Dad	Unknown	Wife of Abdul Qadus
Bibi Aziza	Unknown	Khak Khuday Dad	Nil	Daughter of Abdul Qadus
Naimatullah	10 years old	Khak Khuday Dad	Nil	Son of Abdullah Qadus; hit by shrapnel
Bibi Amir Begum	Unknown	Khak Khuday Dad	Nil	Wife of Abdul Razaq; hit by Apache fire
Bibi Hafiza	14 years old	Khak Khuday Dad	Nil	Daughter of Abdul Razaq; hit by Apache fire
Bibi Fatima	Unknown	Khak Khuday Dad	Nil	Daughter of Abdul Razaq; hit by Apache fire
Bibi Fatima	Unknown	Khak Khuday Dad	Nil	Daughter of Abdul Khadus
Said Ahmad	Unknown	Khak Khuday Dad	Unknown	Son of Said Mohammad
Noor Ahmad	Unknown	Khak Khuday Dad	Unknown	Son of Said Mohamad
Mohammad Iqbal	Unknown	Khak Khuday Dad	Unknown	Son of Said Ahmad; hit in the back by shrapnel
Deen Mohammad	Unknown	Khak Khuday Dad	Village elder and farmer	Son of Said Ahmad
Gul Andam	Unknown	Khak Khuday Dad	Unknown	Daughter of Mohammed Iqbal; suffers mental illness as a result of bombardment

== Aftermath ==
=== Initial media coverage and official responses ===
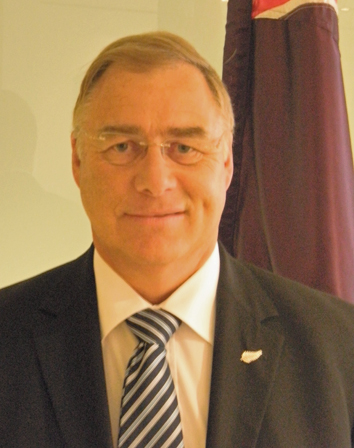
Wayne Mapp served as Defence Minister at the time of Operation Burnham.

Following Operation Burnham, the International Security Assistance Force issued a press release on 23 August 2010 stating that Afghan National Security Forces and coalition forces had conducted a combined operation in the Baghlan Province on Sunday morning resulting in 12 dead insurgents and the capture of weapons including a rocket-propelled grenade launcher, several rocket-propelled grenades, and several boxes of small arms ammunition. The news release claimed that two Taliban commanders had been the targets of the operation. The report also claimed that the Afghan and coalition forces were attacked by numerous insurgents upon arriving in the target area. The combined coalition forces had fought back and used loud speakers to call on the occupants to exit the buildings. The press release also asserted that the operation had disrupted Taliban activity in the province and maintained that no civilians had been killed or injured during the operation.

The first media report on Operation Burnham was a Dari language news report by the Pajhwok News Agency on 23 August 2010 which reported that six civilians, including a woman and an infant, had been killed in an operation by international forces in Tirgiran's Tala wa Barfak District. The Pajhwok report also quoted the ISAF press release's that 12 armed opponents were killed. On 24 August, The New York Times's Dexter Filkins reported that a team of investigators from the American-led coalition forces were heading to northeast Afghanistan to investigate reports by local officials that a nighttime by NATO commandos had left eight civilians and 12 wounded. Filkins also mentioned that Afghan civilians had been killed in a raid by special forces in the village of Naik on 22 August. On 28 August, a Dari report on the Azari Radio website reported that hundreds had demonstrated in Tala wa Barfak calling for the prosecution of international forces who had killed and injured more than 20 civilians in the village of Tirgiran.

In response to media coverage, the ISAF Joint command and Afghan authorities conducted an investigation into the events in Tirgiran valley. On 29 August, an ISAF press release reported that a joint assessment team had determined that several rounds of ammunition from coalition helicopters had fallen short, missing the intended target and instead striking two buildings, which it speculated may have resulted in civilian casualties. The report emphasized that insurgents were using one of the buildings as a base of operations. The ISAF press release attributed the accidental short rounds to a gun site malfunction. US Air Force Brigadier General Timothy M. Zadalis, the ISAF Joint Command director of plans and projects, expressed regret at the possible civilian loss of life or injury. While the report promised a fuller investigation, Hager and Stephenson have contended that the investigation was never conducted and the issue was covered up.

On 20 April 2011, Defence Minister Wayne Mapp confirmed during an interview with Television New Zealand (TVNZ) journalist Guyon Espiner that the NZSAS had been involved in hunting down the Taliban insurgents behind Lieutenant Tim O'Donnell's death last year. In response, the New Zealand Defence Force issued a press release confirming that NZ forces had participated in a Coalition operation against insurgents in the Bamyan province. The press release claimed that nine insurgents were killed during the operation but claimed that allegations of civilian casualties were unfounded. Hager and Stephenson disputed the NZDF's account of the events at Tirgiran Valley and speculated that Mapp had either been deceptive or been deliberately misled by defence officials.

On 30 June 2014, Māori Television's current affairs programme Native Affairs aired a story called "Collateral Damage", which investigated Operation Burnham. Jon Stephenson interviewed two Afghan villagers named Said Ahmad and Mohammed Iqbal from Tirgiran village who claimed that a joint NZ-US-Afghan operation in August 2010 had left 21 civilians dead or wounded. They also asserted that there were no insurgents in the village on the night of the operation. "Collateral Damage" also included a statement from the New Zealand Defence Force standing by its earlier 2011 press statement and that it would be making no further comment. In response to the documentary, Prime Minister Key issue a public statement asserting that no Afghan civilians had been killed during the 2010 NZSAS "revenge mission." Key's remarks were challenged by Stephenson, who defended his report.

=== Successive NZSAS operations and withdrawal ===
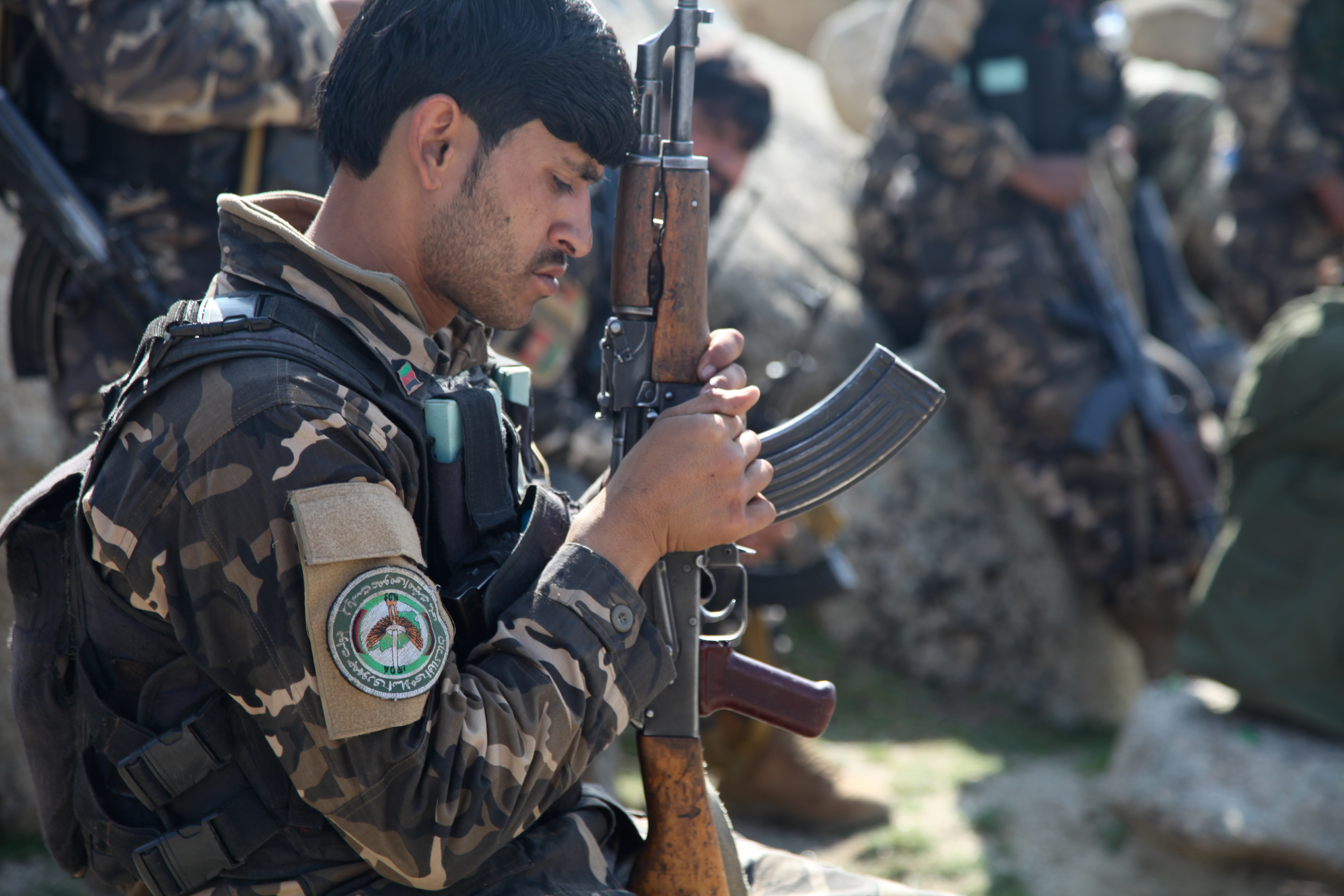
The NZSAS cooperated with Afghan security forces including the National Directorate of Security.

According to Hager and Stephenson, the NZSAS had obtained video footage from a local informant of the insurgent leaders Naimatullah, Qari Miraj, Abdullah Kalta, Anwar and Abdul Ghafar attending the funerals of the villagers killed during Operation Burnham in Naik. The authors have also asserted that the killing of civilians during the raids created unease and discomfort among New Zealand and Afghan military personnel and officials. About ten days after Operation Burnham, the NZSAS and CRU troops conducted a second punitive raid on Naik village using a Chinook and a Blackhawk helicopter. According to SAS troops interviewed by the authors, NZSAS troops destroyed several houses which the villages had rebuilt.

In January 2011, NZSAS forces detained the insurgent Qari Miraj in Kabul and handed him to the National Directorate of Security (NDS), Afghanistan's primary intelligence agency. According to Hager and Stephenson, the NDS had a reputation for torturing and abusing prisoners; which had led the British authorities in December 2008 to order that its military stop transferring prisoners to the NDS. Miraj subsequently confessed to his involvement in insurgent activities, allegedly under torture, and was imprisoned at Kabul's Pul-e-Charkhi prison. In response, an NZDF report rejected Hager and Stephenson's allegation that Qari Miraj had been mistreated while in New Zealand military custody. The report asserted that NZDF personnel had not detained Miraj but had searched him before transferring him to the NDS detention facility. In May, the NZSAS organized the targeted killings of Alawuddin and Qari Musa, two men alleged to have been involved in the August 2010 attack that claimed O'Donnell's life.

On 31 March 2012, the NZSAS contingent withdrew from Afghanistan. However, twelve personnel remained at the ISAF Special Operations Forces Headquarters in intelligence and planning roles. Later that year, NZSAS operatives managed to track down the insurgent Abdullah Kalta to a small village called Karimak by monitoring his cellphone. Acting on this intelligence, Kalta was killed by a bomb from a US aircraft or drone on 21 November. This attack also claimed five others. After news of the NZSAS operation leaked to the media, Prime Minister Key and the Defence Force Chief Lieutenant-General Rhys Jones issued public statements defending the NZSAS's intelligence and military operations in Afghanistan. Kalta was also believed to be the mastermind behind a roadside bomb that killed three New Zealand soldiers Lance Corporal Jacinda Baker, Private Richard Harris and Corporal Luke Tamatea in Bamyan province in August 2012.

In April 2013, the New Zealand provincial reconstruction team withdraw from Bamyan province, ending New Zealand's involvement in the War in Afghanistan. Hager and Stephenson have claimed that Operation Burnham inflamed local hostility against the ISAF forces and Afghan government and boosted sympathy for the Taliban. Citing a local source, the authors have alleged that the Taliban controlled 95 percent of the Tala wa Barfak district including the Tirgiran Valley in 2016. One local village leader Mullah Shafiullah, who had worked as an informant for the New Zealand forces, was also assassinated by a Taliban road bomb in 2011.

== The Hit & Run book and responses ==
On 21 March 2017, the investigate journalists Nicky Hager and Jon Stephenson released their book Hit & Run: The New Zealand SAS in Afghanistan and the meaning of honour. Hit & Run examined the NZSAS's role during the events of Operation Burnham in August 2010, drawing upon interviews with NZ military personnel, Afghan civilians, and soldiers. The book alleged that NZSAS troops had been involved in the killing of civilians during Operation Burnham and that this had been covered up by the New Zealand Defence Force. Hager and Stephenson called for a full, independent inquiry into the events of Operation Burnham. To publicize their book and calls for an inquiry, the authors also created a website called "Hit and Run".

Nicky Hager is a controversial investigative journalist who had previously written several books on various topics including New Zealand's signals intelligence agency the Government Communications Security Bureau and the alleged collusion between the center-right National Party and right-wing bloggers. He had previously touched upon the events of Operation Burnham in a 2011 book called Other People's Wars, which criticized New Zealand's involvement in the war on terror. Jon Stephenson is a war correspondent who had previously settled a lawsuit with the NZDF concerning his investigation of NZSAS troops transferring detainees to the Afghan detainees.

=== Media and public responses ===
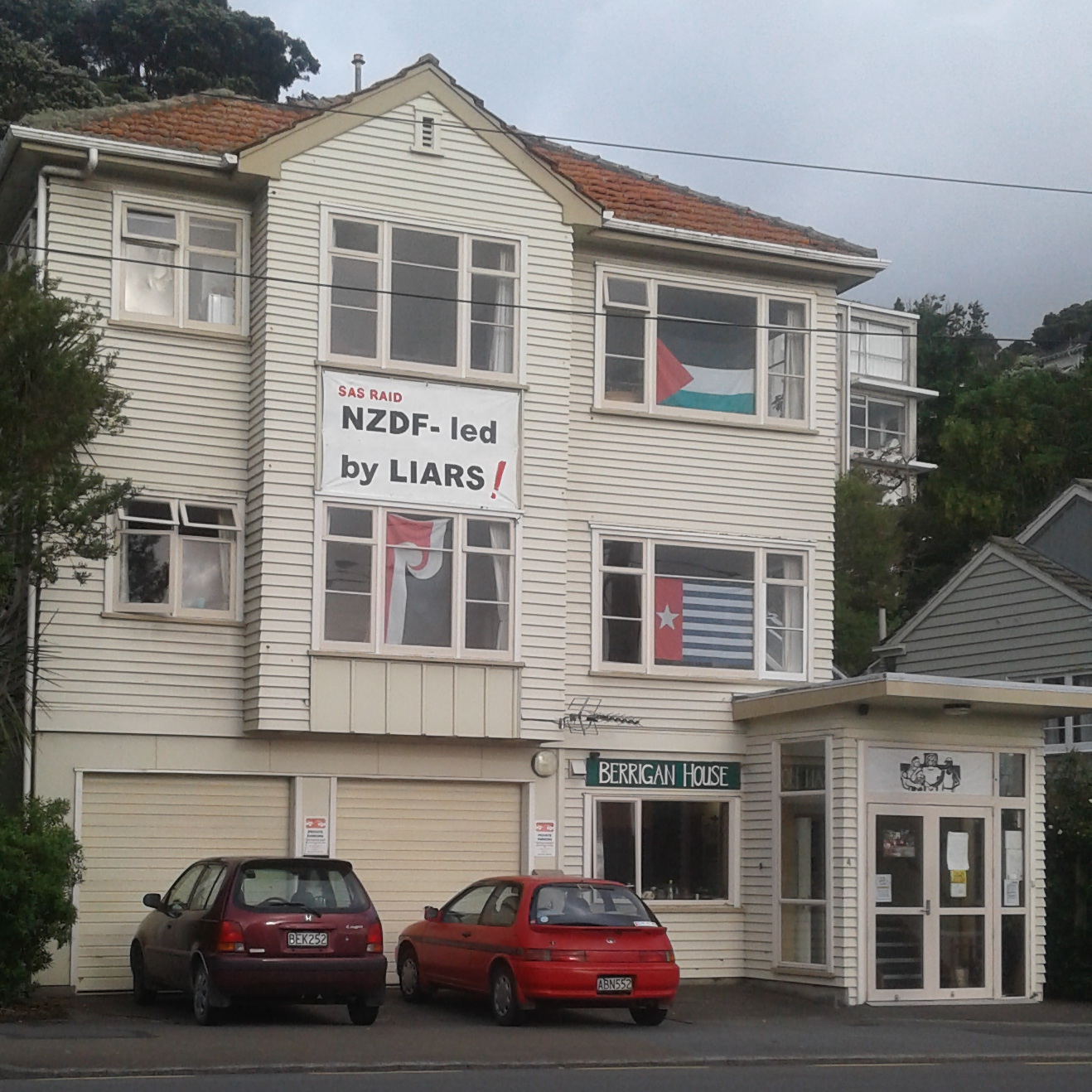
Berrigan House, a Catholic Worker House of Hospitality at Victoria University of Wellington displaying a banner reading 'SAS RAID: NZDF - led by LIARS!'

Hit & Run generated considerable from the New Zealand media, blogosphere, and several public figures. The New Zealand Herald investigative journalist David Fisher commented that if Hager and Stephenson's account could be proven accurate, it should spell an end to the SAS's "aura of secrecy" since the elite unit had misused it. Fisher also called for an inquiry be held "to find out where the truth lies." Meanwhile, Danyl Mclauchland observed that Hager and Stephenson's book was based on interviews on disenchanted defence staff who disliked the SAS's alleged culture of secrecy, elitism and unaccountability. Similar, Fairfax New Zealand editor observed that the authors had obtained high-level access to senior government and defence officials.

The University of Otago law professor Andrew Geddis opined that civilian casualties including the death of three-year old Fatima undermined public trust in the NZDF. Human rights lawyer Allison Cole warned that official inaction could trigger an investigation by the International Criminal Court and urged the New Zealand Government to investigate the matter. Similarly, Amnesty International New Zealand has called for the New Zealand Government to hold an independent inquiry to determine whether New Zealand forces had committed war crimes. Amnesty International also organized an online petition calling for an inquiry.

Conservative blogger Matthew Hooton advocated an independent inquiry investigate the book's claims. Meanwhile, the left-wing blogs No Right Turn and Martyn Bradbury's The Daily Blog denounced the NZSAS and incumbent National Government as war criminals. By contrast, the conservative investigative journalist and online magazine Investigate editor Ian Wishart claimed that Hager and Stephenson were running a failed smear campaign against the New Zealand Defence Force. In addition, critically acclaimed New Zealand film director, producer, and screenwriter Peter Jackson has also called for an inquiry into Hager and Stephenson's allegations.

=== Official responses and calls for an inquiry ===
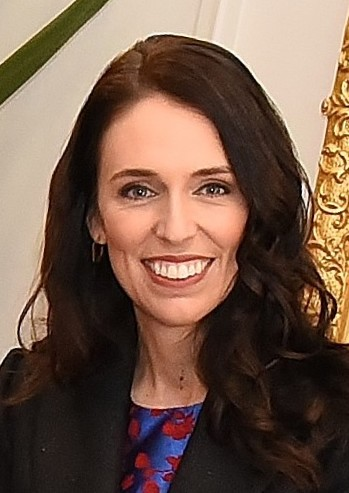
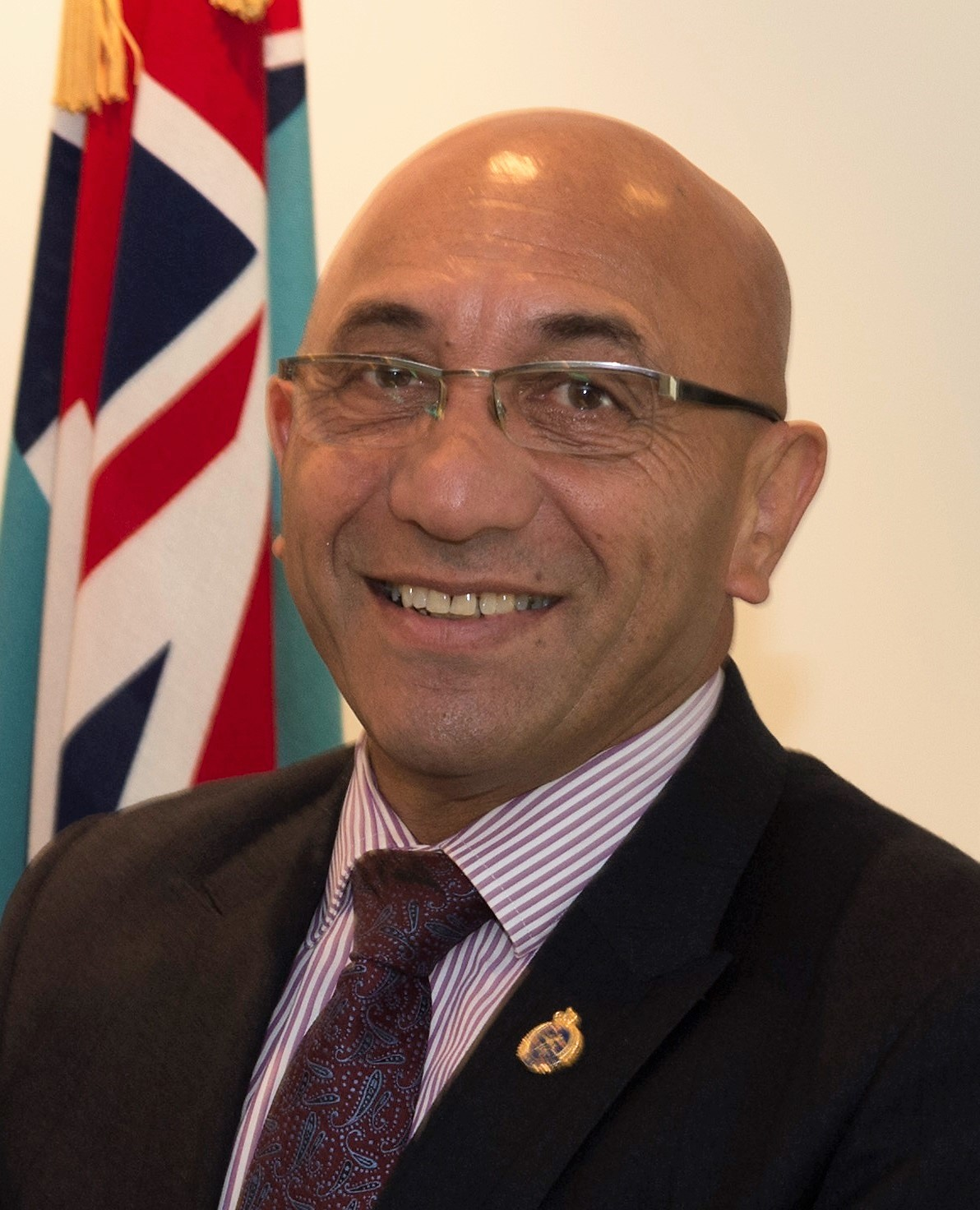
Newly-elected Prime Minister Jacinda Ardern and Defence Minister Ron Mark announced that they would be holding an inquiry into Operation Burnham following the 2017 New Zealand general election.

In response to the book, the NZDF issued a press statement asserting that it stood by its 20 April 2011 statement. The press statement claimed that a joint Afghan government–ISAF investigation found that allegations of civilian casualties were "unfounded" and asserted that NZ forces had abided by the "rules of engagement." On 26 March 2017, the Chief of Defence Lieutenant-General Tim Keating issued a statement claiming that the events of Operation Burnham had occurred in Tirgiran village, and not in Naik and Khak Khuday Dad as claimed by Hager and Stephenson. Keating defended the conduct of NZSAS forces and attributed civilian casualties to a gunsight malfunction on a Coalition helicopter. The following day, Keating held a press conference to rebut Hager and Stephenson's allegations.

While former Prime Minister John Key publicly defended the work of the NZSAS in Afghanistan, the-then Labour Party leader and Leader of the Opposition Andrew Little remarked that Hit & Run raised serious allegations that put the Defence Force's reputation at stake and urged the government to hold a comprehensive review. A spokesperson for the Attorney-General Chris Finlayson also stood by the NZDF's report. On 27 March, Prime Minister Bill English stated that it would be unlikely that the New Zealand Government would be holding a public inquiry into the NZSAS's actions at Operation Burnham due to alleged "major inaccuracies" in Hager and Stephenson's Hit & Run book.

In response to Keating's press release, several lawyers representing the Afghan villagers responded that "Tirgiran Village" did not exist and clarified that Tirgiran was the name of the valley that included Naik and Khak Khuday Dad villages. The authors Hager and Stephenson also admitted getting the exact location of the villages wrong but defended their book's account of Operation Burnham including the names of the village. In late March 2017, the Tirgiran Valley villagers' lawyers McLeod, Rodney Harrison, and Deborah Manning requested that the New Zealand Government undertake a formal inquiry into the events at Naik and Khak Khuday Dad villages. Their request was rebuffed by Prime Minister English, who regarded the timing as suspicious due to the lead-up to the 2017 general election.

Following the 2017 general election, Prime Minister Jacinda Ardern and Defence Minister Ron Mark of the new Labour-led coalition government announced that they would be holding an inquiry into the allegations raised by Hit & Run. The Labour Party and its coalition partners, New Zealand First and the Green Party had supported calls for an inquiry into Operation Burnham. Jacinda also indicated that she was prepared to follow United Nations recommendations on the matter. In response, the now-opposition National Party's Defence Spokesperson Mark Mitchell criticized the Prime Minister for undermining the credibility and legitimacy of the NZDF. In response to further media Official Information Act requests, the New Zealand Defence Force released an info pack on presenting its version of the events of Operation Burnham on 14 March 2018. In this package, the NZDF confirmed that the location of an Afghan village mentioned in Hit & Run was the same place where Operation Burnham had taken place. It also acknowledged that civilian casualties may have occurred during the operation as a result of a helicopter malfunction but asserted that the term unfounded was intended to address the suggestion it was responsible for civilian casualties. In response, Hager regarded this development as a vindication of his and Stephenson's account.

On 19 March 2018, the NZDF acknowledged that photos from Hit & Run were from the same location where Operation Burnham had taken place. Public attention by the media was also drawn when the Group Hit & Run Inquiry Campaign delivered a petition to calling for an inquiry into the actions of the New Zealand Defense Force in Afghanistan in 2010. This delivery of 3,908 signatures on the petition gained significant notoriety as it was delivered Parliament in a coffin.

On 9 April, the Chief Ombudsman Peter Boshier found that the NZDF was justified in withholding most of the information requested in response to Operation Burnham. However, Boshier also ordered the NZDF to release four more briefing papers relating to the NZSAS operation and information about the insurgents killed. He also took issue with the NZDF for not being "more responsive" in releasing information. On 11 April, Attorney-General David Parker announced that the New Zealand Government would be holding an inquiry into Operation Burnham and the allegations in Hit & Run. Hit & Run co-author Stephenson welcomed the planned inquiry but suggested that the inclusion of unseen video footage of armed individuals could "muddy the waters."

=== Government inquiry ===
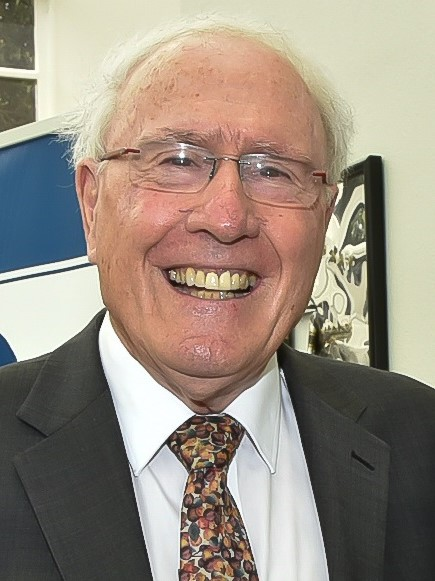
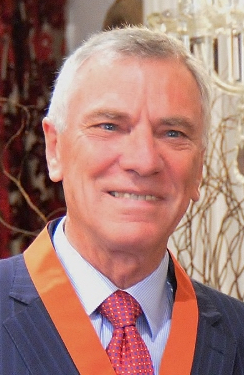
Former Prime Minister Geoffrey Palmer and former Solicitor-General Terence Arnold chaired the inquiry into Operation Burnham.

In late December 2018, the New Zealand Government confirmed that they would be holding an inquiry into Operation Burnham but that most of the proceedings would be secret. The inquiry was headed by former Prime Minister Sir Geoffrey Palmer and former Solicitor-General Sir Terence Arnold. The inquiry will examine the combat operation but much of the evidence will not be made public on safety grounds.

On 13 March 2019, Deborah Manning, one of the Afghan villagers' lawyers, filed for a judicial review of the decision not to have an open inquiry of Operation Burnham. Manning argued that the inquiry should focus on the victims and survivors of the NZSAS operation. Manning's criticisms of the proceedings have been echoed by author Nicky Hager, who criticised the secrecy around the government inquiry into Operation Burnham.

On 17 June 2019, spy watchdog Inspector-General of Intelligence and Security Cheryl Gwyn criticized the country's spy agencies NZSIS and the Government Communications Security Bureau for failing to provide more than 100,000 emails to the inquiry into Operation Burnham. On 18 June, it was reported that the Afghan villagers had withdrawn from the Operation Burnham inquiry. Their lawyer Deborah Manning stated that the villagers were disillusioned with the process and had lost all confidence in the inquiry, particularly the death of three-year old Fatima.

On 20 June 2019, Hit and Run co-author Jon Stephenson backtracked on a key claim in the book that no insurgents had been present in Naik village during the NZSAS raid. Stephenson had interviewed two insurgent commanders Qari Miraj and Maulawi Naimatullah, who claimed they were within the vicinity of the village during that raid. This contradicted the villagers' testimony that no insurgents had been present in the two Afghan villages during the raid. Both Naimatullah and Miraj said their involvement in the ambush of the PRT convoy that killed O'Donnell but both strenuously denied that insurgents were present at Khak Khuday Dad, the first village allegedly attacked by NZSAS forces. In response to this report, co-author Hager and the villagers' lawyer Manning stated that the new information confirmed their allegation that the NZSAS killed six civilians and injured 15 in the raids.

On 16 September 2019, the former Defence Force chief Sir Jerry Mateparae admitted that earlier briefings made to the-then Defence Minister Jonathan Coleman had been inaccurate. Mateparae's initial report differed from an ISAF report which had been found in a safe in the Defence Force's headquarters following Stephenson's inquiry into Operation Burnham in 2014. Matepare stated that he did not know how the report had gotten there but denied that the Defence Force had engaged in a cover-up.

On 31 July 2020, Attorney General David Parker released the Burnham Inquiry's report, which concluded that the NZ Defence Force did not plot to cover up casualties as alleged by Hager and Stephenson. The Inquiry found that while a child had been killed in Operation Burnham, it was unlikely to have been Fatima, a three year old referenced as being killed in Hit and Run. Analysis of the image believed to be Fatima on page 52 of the book showed that the photo itself was taken in 2016 on a mobile phone not released until September 2012 . The inquiry also ruled that while aspects of the military operation were problematic, it was justified under international law and within applicable rules of engagement. While four people were killed, the inquiry was unable to determine whether they were civilians or insurgents. Air Marshall Short, the chief of the Defence Force, apologised on behalf of the Defence Force for providing inaccurate information but welcomed the inquiry's finding that New Zealand military personnel conformed to the rules of engagement and international humanitarian law. The inquiry also found that the insurgent Qari Miraj, who had been captured by the NZSAS for his role in the attack claiming Lieutenant O'Donnell's life, had been assaulted by an NZSAS soldier while being detained. Miraj was subsequently handed over to Afghanistan's National Directorate of Security. Prime Minister Ardern issued a statement that the findings did not affect her briefings with the Defence Force but said that it was important to address "major failings" in the communication between the Defence Force and New Zealand Government. Ardern also credited Hager and Stephenson with initiating a process to improve communications between the Government and Defence Force. By contrast, Amnesty International New Zealand executive director Meg de Ronde described the inquiry's findings as "disturbing" and said that they raised questions about the integrity of the Defence Force.

== Sources ==
- Crosby, Ron (2009). NZSAS: The First Fifty Years. Viking. ISBN 978-0-67-007424-2.
- Hager, Nicky; Stephenson, Jon (2017). Hit & Run: The New Zealand SAS in Afghanistan and the meaning of honour. Nelson, New Zealand: Potton & Burton. ISBN 9780947503390.

== External sources ==
- "Hit and Run homepage". Hit and Run book website.
- "Inquiry into Operation Burnham". Inquiry into Operation Burnham website. New Zealand Government.
- "Operation Burnham information pack" (PDF). New Zealand Defence Force.
