= New Zealand Operational Service Medal =

- Obverse (top left) and reverse (top right) of the medal. Ribbon: 32 mm, black with six white stripes.
- Type: Campaign medal
- Awarded for: Campaign service
- Description: Silver-plated base metal disk, 38 mm diameter
- Presented by: New Zealand
- Eligibility: New Zealand forces
- Campaign: All New Zealand personnel awarded a medal for operational service since 3 September 1945
- Clasps: None authorised
- Established: July 2002
- Total: 35,000

The New Zealand Operational Service Medal (NZOSM) is a New Zealand campaign medal for award to New Zealanders who have served on operations since 3 September 1945. Eligibility for the NZ OSM commences the day after the final eligibility date (2 September 1945) for the 1939–45 New Zealand War Service Medal. The medal was instituted in 2002 to provide specific New Zealand recognition for operational service. It is awarded in addition to any New Zealand, Commonwealth or foreign campaign medal. It is awarded once only to an individual, regardless of how many times he or she has deployed on operations.

Personnel and veterans who have been awarded a campaign medal for operational service since 3 September 1945 qualify for the award of the NZOSM, provided that the particular campaign medal has been approved for acceptance and wear by New Zealanders. In addition, personnel who, under certain circumstances, have not completed the qualifying period for an approved campaign medal, but who have completed a specific period of service in an operational area towards such a medal (generally seven days on the posted strength of a qualifying unit), are eligible for the NZOSM.

To date, the NZOSM has been issued to over 19,000 veterans, currently serving military personnel and civilians. It is estimated that over 40,000 New Zealanders are eligible for this medal.

== Clasps ==
- None authorised.
