= Papakura Military Camp =

Military camp in New Zealand

- Papakura North, New Zealand
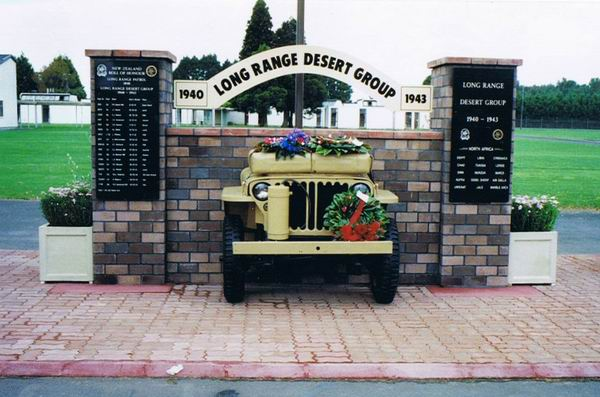
- Long Range Desert Group Memorial at Papakura Camp

Site information
- Type: Army Camp
- Owner: New Zealand Defence Force
- Controlled by: New Zealand Army

Location
- Location within New Zealand
- Coordinates: 37.0497°S 174.9441°E

Site history
- Built: 1939
- Built by: Sir William Stevenson
- In use: 1939–present

Garrison information
- Occupants: New Zealand Special Air Service

Map

Papakura Military Camp is a New Zealand Army military camp located in the Auckland suburb of Papakura North, in northern New Zealand. Originally built as a mobilisation training camp at the beginning of World War II, it is now the base for the 1st New Zealand Special Air Service (SAS) Regiment and support services.

== History ==
On 16 August 1939 work began on the construction of a large military training mobilisation centre on the outskirts of Papakura, with training facilities for 6000 men. The Papakura centre was the last of three planned mobilisation camps, constructed after the camps at Burnham and Trentham.

Originally known as the Papakura mobilisation camp, it was the first New Zealand Army camp to be built with a water-borne sewage system and refrigerated cookhouses. The site chosen for the camp was compulsorily purchased from the McLennan family under the Public Works Act for defence purposes.

In November 1939, 700 soldiers of the 18th Battalion moved in. Travelling by train from Hopuhopu Camp they arrived at Tironui Railway Station then marched to the camp.

The camp was closed from 1992 to 2002. In 2001–2002 a new base for the New Zealand Special Air Service was built at Papakura; the facility was named Rennie Lines, after the founding NZSAS Commanding Officer Major Frank Rennie, and officially opened on 14 December 2002.

In the early 2000s some land surrounding the camp was set aside for new housing developments by the Papakura District Council.

== See also ==
- Burnham, New Zealand
- Linton Military Camp
- Papakura District
- Trentham Military Camp
- Waiouru Military Camp
