= Head of the Armed Forces (New Zealand) =

NZDF Position of the King of New Zealand

- Coat of arms of New Zealand

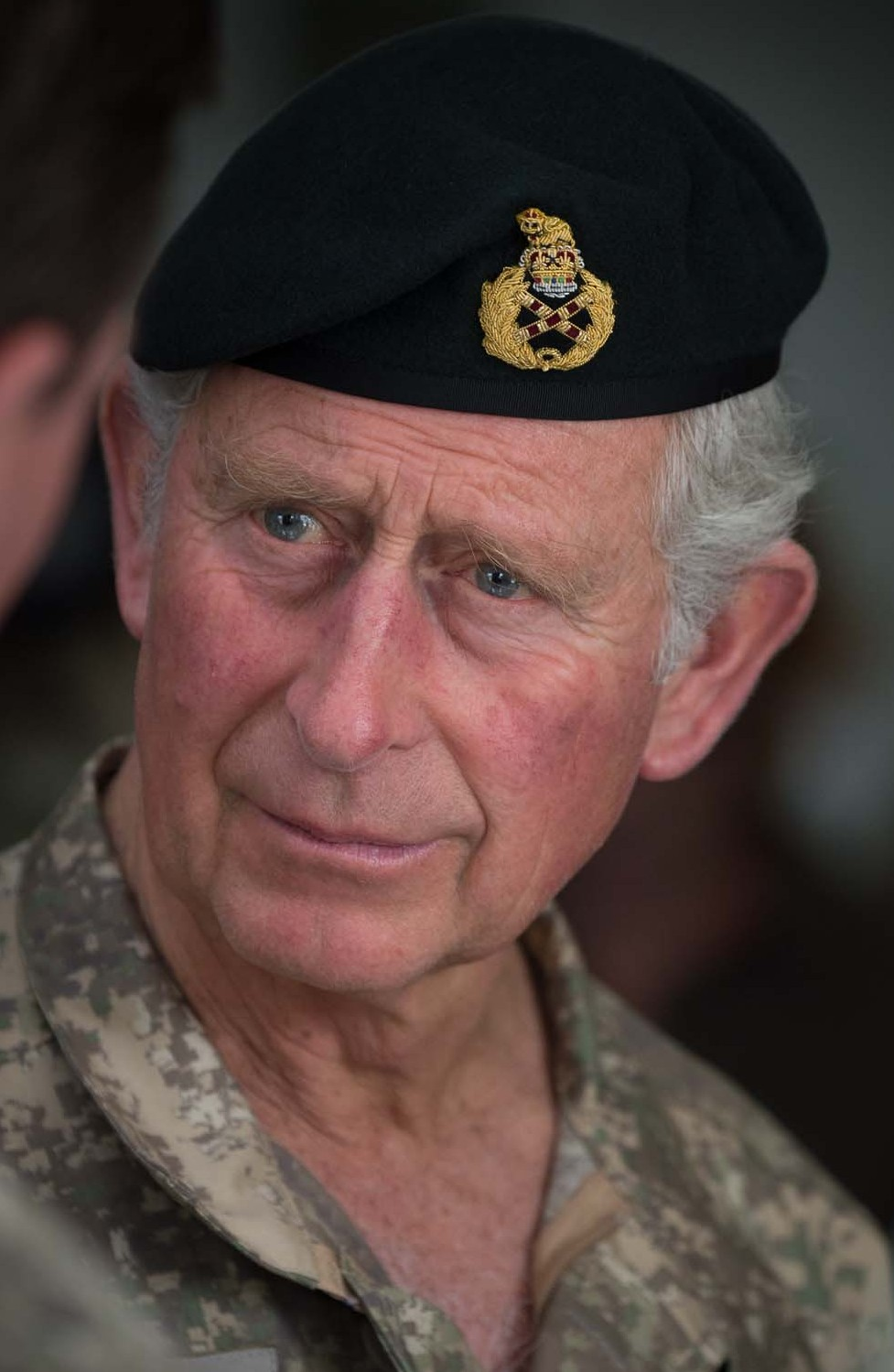
- Incumbent; Charles III; King of New Zealand
- New Zealand Defence Force
- Style: His Majesty

Head of the Armed Forces is a position held ex officio by the monarch of New Zealand, Charles III. In this role, the monarch promotes and commemorates the history and service of the New Zealand Defence Force. The monarch also serves as the focus of fealty in the New Zealand Defence Force's oath of allegiance.

While Elizabeth II was the Head of the Armed Forces, she assumed the role of colonel-in-chief for several New Zealand military units.

The King's representative in New Zealand, the governor-general, holds the title of Commander-in-Chief and is constitutionally the supreme authority in defence matters in New Zealand.

== Commander-in-Chief ==
The King's representative in New Zealand, the governor-general, is also called the Commander-in-Chief of New Zealand, and is constitutionally the supreme authority in defence matters in New Zealand. The title is not considered a separate position from the governor-general, with the "Governor-General and Commander-in-Chief" being considered the compounded title of the office. However, except in formal circumstances, only one of the titles is used, with the title of commander-in-chief being used in contexts associated with the armed forces.

In practice, the role of the commander-in-chief is ceremonial, with the governor-general serving as a "patron of the New Zealand Defence Force". The governor-general exercises their authority as commander-in-chief on the advice of the minister of defence or other ministers of the New Zealand Government. The minister of defence is provided the power of control over the Defence Force on behalf of the Government and exercises this power through their primary military advisor, the Chief of Defence Force.

=== History ===
Governors in New Zealand were vested with the requisite powers to raise armed forces as early as the 1860s. On at least one occasion, during the Second Taranaki War, the governor of New Zealand had to take personal command of military forces. The governor of New Zealand was first designated the commander-in-chief in legislation passed in 1865, providing him the authority to raise forces and call upon them. Defence legislation enacted in New Zealand since 1865 has perpetuated the statutory provision that vested these powers to the governor-general. It remains in Defence Act 1990 under sections five and six.

The governor-general and commander-in-chief were constituted into a single office through the Letters Patent Constituting the Office of Governor-General of New Zealand in 1983. The Letter Patent also provided the office with all other prerogative powers relating to the armed forces. The Defence Act 1990 also expressly protects these powers against suppression by legislation.
