= Provincial Reconstruction Team (New Zealand) =

The New Zealand Provincial Reconstruction Team was a military deployment, a provincial reconstruction team of the Operation Enduring Freedom coalition, later transferred to the International Security Assistance Force. It was active in Bamiyan, Bamiyan Province, Afghanistan from August 2003 to April 2013, under the Defence Force codename "Task Group Crib". Most personnel came from the New Zealand Defence Force, but there were a number of U.S. military, State Department, and, possibly also National Security Agency/Central Intelligence Agency staff attached.

Bamiyan was one of the first pilot centres for the Afghan New Beginnings Programme of Disarmament, demobilization and reintegration. On 4 July 2004 disarmament began in Bamiyan, and on 15 July 2004 disarmament was continuing in Bamiyan including soldiers from the 34th and 35th Divisions of the then Afghan Army, often referred to as the Afghan Military or Militia Forces.

Commander Crib Rotation 6, then-Colonel Tim Keating, later became Chief of Defence Force, as did then-Group Captain Kevin Short, Commander Crib Rotation 9. Then-Lieutenant Colonel John Boswell, Commander Crib Rotation 16, later became Chief of Army.
