= Bruce Ferguson (RNZAF officer) =

New Zealand Chief of Defence Force

Sir Bruce Ferguson
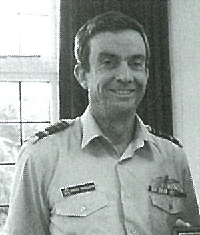
- Ferguson in 2002
- Born: 14 July 1949 (age 77); Napier, New Zealand
- Military career
- Allegiance: New Zealand
- Branch: Royal New Zealand Air Force
- Service years: 1969–2006
- Rank: Air Marshal
- Commands: Chief of Defence Force; RNZAF Base Auckland; RNZAF Operations Wing; Central Flying School
- Conflicts: Vietnam War
- Awards: Knight Companion of the New Zealand Order of Merit; Officer of the Order of the British Empire; Air Force Cross; Queen's Commendation for Valuable Service in the Air
- Other work: Ministry of Civil Defence & Emergency Management; Government Communications Security Bureau

Air Marshal Sir Bruce Reid Ferguson, KNZM, OBE, AFC, JP (born 14 July 1949) is a retired Royal New Zealand Air Force officer who served as Chief of the New Zealand Defence Force and Director of the Government Communications Security Bureau. He took up the appointment when the previous director, Warren Tucker, was appointed as Director of the Security Intelligence Service on 1 November 2006. Ferguson's term of appointment was for four years, stepping down from the role in 2011. Following his retirement, in July 2012, he was appointed as a Justice of the Peace for New Zealand.

Previous to this he was the acting director of the New Zealand Ministry of Civil Defence & Emergency Management, after he retired earlier in 2006 from a distinguished military career which culminated in four years as the New Zealand Chief of Defence Force.

== Early life and family ==
Ferguson was born in Napier on 14 July 1949, the son of Phyllis and Arthur Ferguson, and educated at Tauranga Boys' College. In 1974, he married Rosemary Rondel, and the couple went on to have three children.

== List of education and training qualifications ==
- 1970 – Graduated as RNZAF pilot
- 1989 – Graduated USAF Air War College
- 1995 – Graduated Royal College of Defence Studies
- 2000 – Graduated Ashridge Senior Executive Management Course
- 2001 – Senior Fellow, Asia Pacific Strategic Studies College
- 2006 – Distinguished Fellow of the Institute for Strategic Leadership

== List of career highlights and achievements ==
- 1969–73 – Pilot training/operational flying
- 1973–82 – Flying instructor/Commander, Search and Rescue detachment/operational flying
- 1982–84 – Commanding officer, Central Flying School
- 1984–86 – Staff officer to Chief of the Air Staff
- 1986–88 – Director, Air Force Personnel/USAF Air War College
- 1989–91 – Officer Commanding, RNZAF Operations Wing
- 1991–95 – Commander, RNZAF Base Auckland/Royal College of Defence Studies
- 1995–97 – Chief of Air Force Personnel
- 1997–2001 – Assistant Chief of Defence Force (Personnel)
- 2001–2006 – Chief of Defence Force
- 2006–2006 – Acting Director, Ministry of Civil Defence & Emergency Management (MCDEM)
- 2006–2011 – Director, Government Communications Security Bureau (GCSB)

== List of honours and awards ==
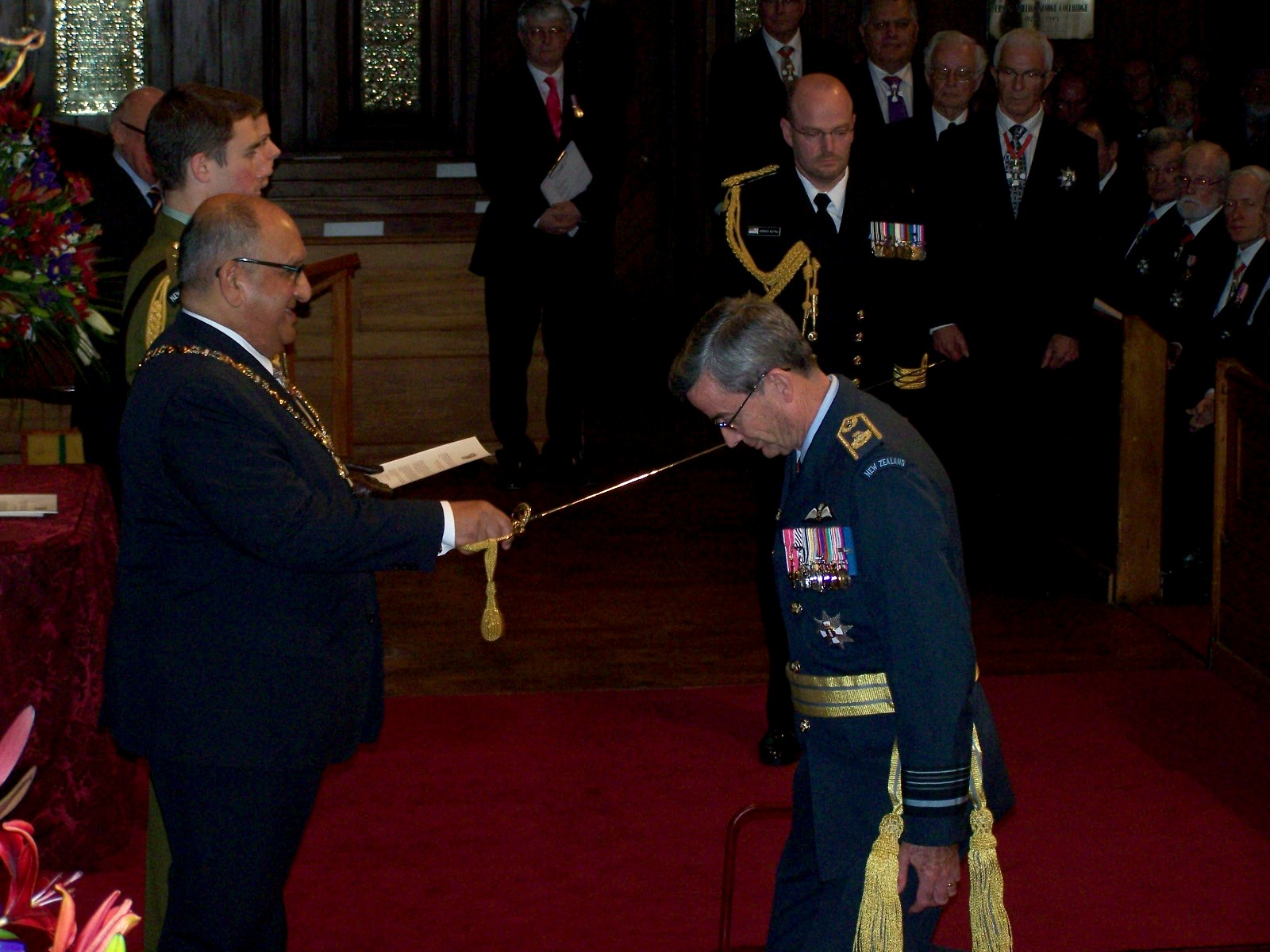
Ferguson's investiture as a Knight Companion of the New Zealand Order of Merit by the governor-general, Sir Anand Satyanand, in 2009

- 1977 – Queen's Commendation for Valuable Service in the Air in the 1978 New Year Honours
- 1984 – Air Force Cross in the 1984 Queen's Birthday Honours
- 1990 – New Zealand 1990 Commemoration Medal
- 1994 – Officer of the Order of the British Empire in the 1994 Queen's Birthday Honours
- 2006 – Darjah Utama Bakti Cemerlang (Tentera) (Distinguished Service Order) (Singapore)
- 2006 – Distinguished Companion of the New Zealand Order of Merit, for services to the New Zealand Defence Force, in the 2006 Queen's Birthday Honours
- 2009 – DCNZM redesignated as Knight Companion of the New Zealand Order of Merit

Military offices
Preceded by Air Marshal Carey Adamson	Chief of Defence Force; 2001–2006	Succeeded by Lieutenant General Jerry Mateparae
Government offices
Preceded by Warren Tucker	Director of the Government Communications Security Bureau; 2006–2011	Succeeded by Jerry Mateparae
