= Vice Chief of Defence Force (New Zealand) =

Senior appointment in the New Zealand Defence Force

- Incumbent; Matt Weston; Acting since 2 November 2026
- Member of: New Zealand Defence Force
- Reports to: Chief of Defence Force
- Inaugural holder: Air Vice Marshal; David Bamfield
- Formation: February 2004

The Vice Chief of Defence Force (VCDF) is a senior appointment in the New Zealand Defence Force. The position was established in February 2004 in response to the Review of Accountabilities and Structural Arrangements between the Ministry of Defence and the New Zealand Defence Force undertaken by Don Hunn (known as the "Hunn Review") and reported on in September 2002. Hunn recommended greater integration between top-level military and civil personnel responsible for the command and governance of the New Zealand Defence Force, and suggested the position of VCDF be created to assist the Chief of Defence Force as a chief staff officer. The current VCDF, since 2 November 2026, is Acting Major General Matt Weston, who will hold this position until a formal replacement is announced at a later date.

== Appointees ==
This along with the * (asterisk) indicates that the individual was subsequently appointed Chief of Defence Force.

The following list chronologically records those who have held the post of VCDF, with rank and honours as at the completion of the individual's term.

Rank	Name	Postnominals	Service	Term began	Term ended
Air Vice Marshal	David Bamfield	ONZM, DSD	RNZAF	February 2004	February 2008
Rear Admiral	Jack Steer	ONZM	RNZN	February 2008	November 2012
Major General	Tim Keating*	MNZM	Army	December 2012	January 2014
Air Vice Marshal	Kevin Short*		RNZAF	31 March 2014	30 June 2018
Air Vice Marshal	Tony Davies*	MNZM	RNZAF	10 September 2018	6 June 2024
Rear Admiral	Mat Williams	MNZM	RNZN	27 August 2024	present
