= Peter Stockwell =

New Zealand air force marshal

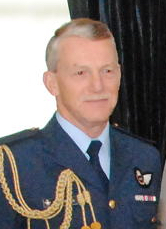
- Stockwell in 2013
- Military career
- Allegiance: New Zealand
- Branch: Royal New Zealand Air Force
- Service years: 1973–2014
- Rank: Air Vice Marshal
- Nickname: Stocky
- Commands: Chief of Air Force; Joint Forces New Zealand; No. 40 Squadron RNZAF
- Awards: Officer of the New Zealand Order of Merit; Air Force Cross

Air Vice Marshal Peter James Stockwell, ONZM, AFC is a retired senior Royal New Zealand Air Force (RNZAF) commander and former Chief of Air Force.

== Career ==
Stockwell joined the RNZAF in January 1973 as a navigator. On the completion of his navigator training, Stockwell was posted to No. 1 Squadron, which flew the B170 Bristol Freighter at that time. He later held flying posts on No. 41 Squadron RNZAF based in Singapore and No. 40 Squadron RNZAF based at RNZAF Base Auckland at Whenuapai.

On 1 May 2011, Stockwell was appointed Chief of Air Force in succession to Air Vice Marshal Graham Lintott. Stockwell's tenure ended on 1 May 2014, at which point he retired from the RNZAF following 41 years of service. Stockwell went on to become CTC Aviation's (now L3Harris) managing director.

Stockwell was awarded the Air Force Cross in the 1995 Queen's Birthday Honours. In the 2014 Queen's Birthday Honours, he was appointed an Officer of the New Zealand Order of Merit, for services to the New Zealand Defence Force.

Military offices
Preceded by Air Vice Marshal Graham Lintott	Chief of Air Force; 2011–2014	Succeeded by Air Vice Marshal Mike Yardley
Preceded by Major General Rhys Jones	Commander Joint Forces New Zealand; 2009–2011	Succeeded by Major General Dave Gawn
