= Jack Steer =

New Zealand navy officer

Jack Raymond Steer
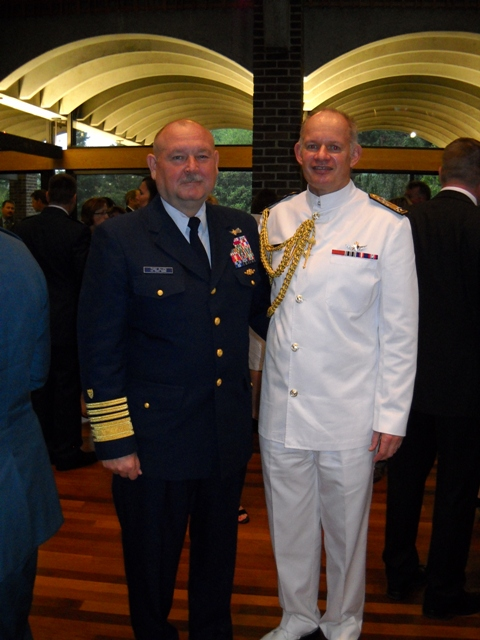
- Steer (right) with Admiral Thad Allen of the US Coast Guard in June 2009
- Born: Christchurch, New Zealand
- Military career
- Allegiance: New Zealand
- Branch: Royal New Zealand Navy
- Service years: 1973–2015
- Rank: Rear Admiral
- Commands: Chief of Navy (2012–15); Vice Chief of Defence Force (2008–12); Commander Joint Forces New Zealand (2006–07); Maritime Component Commander (2004–06); HMNZS Wellington (1994–96)
- Awards: Officer of the New Zealand Order of Merit

Rear Admiral Jack Raymond Steer, ONZM is a retired Royal New Zealand Navy officer, who served as Chief of Navy from 2012 to 2015.

== Career ==
Born in Christchurch, Steer joined the Royal New Zealand Navy in 1973. He served as chief of staff at Joint Forces Headquarters from January 2003 to April 2004, when he was promoted to commodore and appointed as Maritime Component Commander. He was appointed Deputy Chief of Navy in January 2006, before taking up the position of Commander Joint Forces New Zealand in May, with promotion to rear admiral. In February 2008, he was appointed Vice Chief of Defence Force. He served in the post until 2012, when he was appointed Chief of Navy.

Steer was appointed an Officer of the New Zealand Order of Merit in the 1996 Queen's Birthday Honours.

Military offices
Preceded by Rear Admiral Tony Parr	Chief of Navy; 2012–2015	Succeeded by Rear Admiral John Martin
Preceded by Air Vice Marshal David Bamfield	Vice Chief of Defence Force; 2008–2012	Succeeded by Major General Tim Keating
Preceded by Major General Lou Gardiner	Commander Joint Forces New Zealand; 2006–2007	Succeeded by Major General Rhys Jones
