= Commander Joint Forces New Zealand =

Head of the Headquarters Joint Forces New Zealand

- Incumbent; Major General Robert Krushka since September 2024
- Member of: New Zealand Defence Force
- Reports to: Chief of Defence Force
- Inaugural holder: Major General; Martyn Dunne
- Formation: April 2001

The Commander Joint Forces New Zealand (COMJFNZ) is a senior appointment in the New Zealand Defence Force, responsible for the command of Headquarters Joint Forces New Zealand. The COMJFNZ is, in effect, the operational commander of all joint operations and exercises within the New Zealand Defence Force, and reports direct to the Chief of Defence Force. Assisting the COMJFNZ are three service component commanders—the Maritime Component Commander, the Land Component Commander, and the Air Component Commander—who are jointly responsible to the COMJFNZ and their respective service chiefs (the Chief of Navy, Chief of Army, and Chief of Air Force) for the capability, training and operations of personnel and units from their respective services.

The commander and headquarters of Joint Forces New Zealand were established in 2001 under Major General Martyn Dunne. The command was formed in an effort to integrate and centralise command of operational units within the three distinct branches of the New Zealand Defence Force. Joint Forces New Zealand is headquartered at Trentham Military Camp in Upper Hutt. The incumbent COMJFNZ, Rear Admiral James Gilmour, was appointed to the position in November 2018.

== Appointees ==
The following list chronologically records those who have held the post of COMJFNZ, with rank and honours as at the completion of the individual's term.

Rank	Name	Postnominals	Service	Term began	Term ended
Major General	Martyn Dunne	CNZM	Army	April 2001	2004
Air Vice Marshal	Graham Lintott		RNZAF	September 2004	16 November 2004
Major General	Lou Gardiner	ONZM	Army	17 November 2004	2006
Rear Admiral	Jack Steer	ONZM	RNZN	May 2006	October 2007
Major General	Rhys Jones		Army	October 2007	30 April 2009
Air Vice Marshal	Peter Stockwell	AFC	RNZAF	1 May 2009	2011
Major General	Dave Gawn	MBE	Army	2011	2013
Air Vice Marshal	Kevin Short		RNZAF	25 February 2013	30 March 2014
Major General	Tim Gall		Army	31 March 2014	31 October 2018
Rear Admiral	Jim Gilmour		RNZN	1 November 2018	30 August 2024
Major General	Robert Krushka	MNZM	Army	1 September 2024	Incumbent
