= Jerry Mateparae =

Governor-General of New Zealand from 2011 to 2016

Lieutenant General The Right Honourable Sir Jerry Mateparae GNZM QSO KStJ
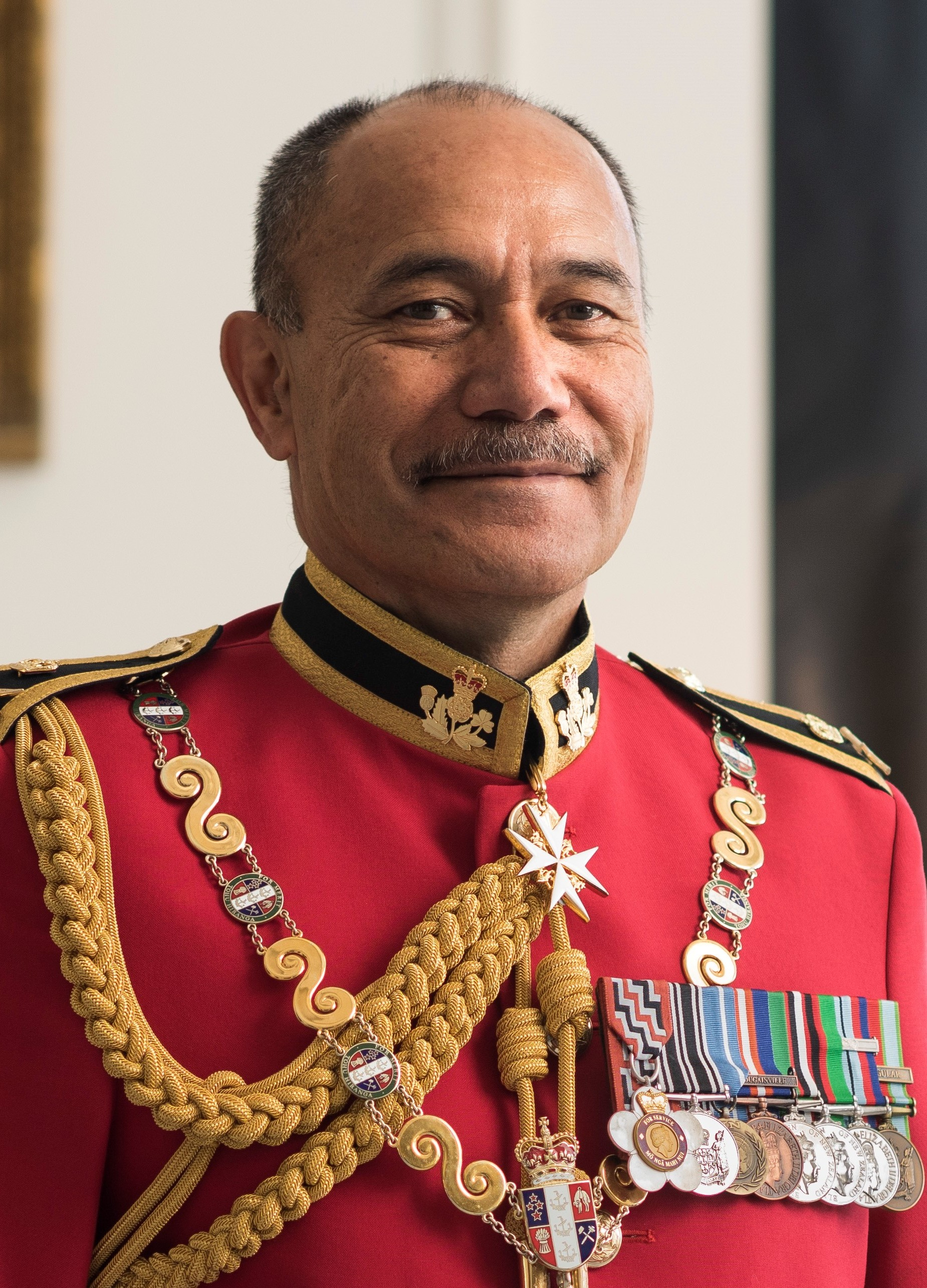
- Official portrait, 2011

20th Governor-General of New Zealand
- In office 31 August 2011 – 31 August 2016
- Monarch: Elizabeth II
- Prime Minister: John Key
- Preceded by: Sir Anand Satyanand
- Succeeded by: Dame Patsy Reddy

27th High Commissioner of New Zealand to the United Kingdom
- In office 24 March 2017 – 17 April 2020
- Prime Minister: Bill English; Jacinda Ardern
- Preceded by: Lockwood Smith
- Succeeded by: Bede Corry

Personal details
- Born: 14 November 1954 (age 72) Whanganui, New Zealand
- Spouse(s): Raewynne McGhie (m. 1973; died 1990) Janine Grenside
- Children: 5
- Education: Officer Cadet School, Portsea; Staff College, Camberley; Australian Defence College; Royal College of Defence Studies; University of Waikato

Military service
- Allegiance: New Zealand
- Branch/service: New Zealand Army
- Years of service: 1972–2011
- Rank: Lieutenant General
- Commands: Chief of Defence Force; Chief of Army; Land Command; 1st Battalion, Royal New Zealand Infantry Regiment; New Zealand Special Air Service
- Battles/wars: Operation Bel Isi; Operation Warden

Lieutenant General Sir Jeremiah Mateparae GNZM QSO KStJ (born 14 November 1954) is a New Zealand former army officer who served as the 20th governor-general of New Zealand between 2011 and 2016, the second Māori person to hold the office, after Sir Paul Reeves. A former officer in the New Zealand Army, he was the Chief of the Defence Force from 2006 to 2011, and then served as the director of the New Zealand Government Communications Security Bureau for five months in 2011. Following his term as governor-general, Mateparae was the high commissioner of New Zealand to the United Kingdom between 2017 and 2020.

== Early life ==
Mateparae was born on 14 November 1954 to the Andrews family in Wanganui. He was given to his mother's brother, a Mateparae, to be raised in the Māori customary adoption known as whāngai. His birth father and his adoptive father were both ministers in the Rātana Church. He is descended from the Ngāti Tūwharetoa and Ngāti Kahungunu tribes and also has links to Tūhoe and tribes in the upper Whanganui. He was raised in the Whanganui suburb of Castlecliff and attended Castlecliff Primary School, Rutherford Intermediate School and Wanganui High School.

== Military career ==
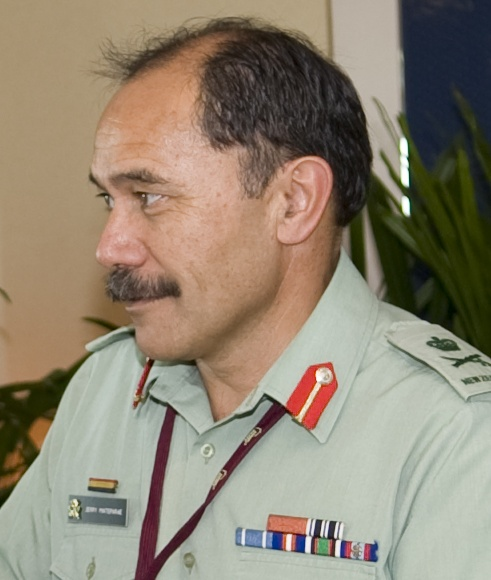
Lieutenant General Jerry Mateparae as Chief of Defence Force on 29 May 2009, in Singapore.

Mateparae enlisted as a private in the Regular Force of the New Zealand Army in June 1972. In December 1976, he graduated from the Officer Cadet School, Portsea in Australia. He served in both battalions of the Royal New Zealand Infantry Regiment and in the New Zealand Special Air Service. He was a platoon commander in Singapore in 1979.

Mateparae had two operational postings to peace support missions, one 12-month tour of duty with the United Nations Truce Supervision Organization as the Chief Observer in Southern Lebanon from May 1994 to May 1995, and commanding the combined-force Peace Monitoring Group on Bougainville during Operation Bel Isi in 1998. On 24 December 1999, he was promoted to brigadier, in the post of Land Component Commander, Joint Forces New Zealand. From December 1999 to July 2001, he was the Joint Commander for New Zealand forces attached to the United Nations Transitional Administration in East Timor.

In February 2002, Mateparae was promoted to major general and became the Chief of General Staff. The title was changed in mid-2002 to Chief of Army. On 1 May 2006 he was promoted to lieutenant general and took up appointment as the Chief of Defence Force, New Zealand's senior uniformed military appointment, which he held until 24 January 2011.

On 26 August 2010, Prime Minister John Key announced the appointment of Mateparae as Director of the Government Communications Security Bureau. Mateparae was appointed for a five-year term commencing on 7 February 2011 but stepped down from the role on 1 July 2011.

== Governor-General of New Zealand ==
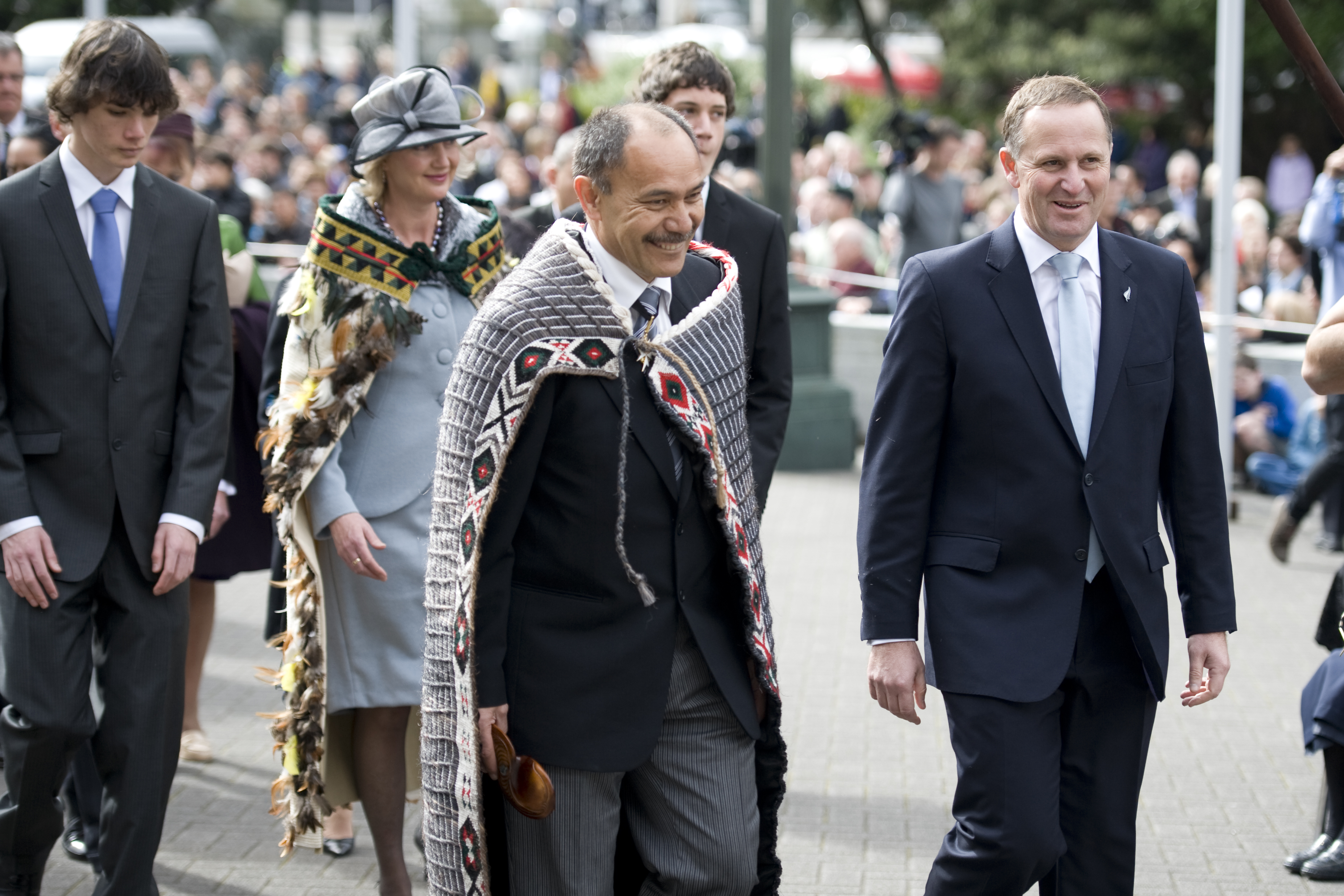
Jerry Mateparae with Prime Minister John Key at the ceremony at which he was sworn in as Governor-General

On 8 March 2011, Prime Minister John Key announced the recommendation of Mateparae as the next Governor-General of New Zealand. The Queen of New Zealand made the appointment later that day. On 31 August 2011 he was sworn in as the governor-general for a five-year term.

On 20 May 2011, Mateparae was appointed an Additional Knight Grand Companion of the New Zealand Order of Merit and as an Additional Companion of the Queen's Service Order. He became Chancellor and Principal Knight Grand Companion of the New Zealand Order of Merit and Principal Companion of the Queen's Service Order upon taking office as governor-general, making him "His Excellency Lieutenant General The Right Honourable Sir Jeremiah Mateparae GNZM QSO".

During the 2019 Operation Burnham inquiry Mateparae admitted to providing inaccurate information to Parliament.

On 14 November 2012 Mateparae hosted a party for the 64th birthday of Charles, Prince of Wales who was visiting New Zealand, and for 64 New Zealanders, all of whom shared the same birthday of 14 November.

In April 2013 Mateparae travelled to Afghanistan to mark the end of New Zealand Defence Force's deployment there. In June 2014, he attended the 70th anniversary commemorations of D Day in Normandy with Queen Elizabeth II, other heads of government and world leaders, taking a number of New Zealand veterans with him.

Mateparae expanded on a tradition started by his predecessor, Sir Anand Satyanand in 2012, releasing the Governor-General's New Year Message on video for the first time.

== High Commissioner to the United Kingdom ==
On 16 December 2016, it was announced that Mateparae would be New Zealand's next High Commissioner to the United Kingdom, replacing Sir Lockwood Smith in early 2017. His term ended in April 2020.

== Subsequent activities ==
In September 2024, Mateparae was chosen by the government of Papua New Guinea to serve as moderator in negotiations between the central government and the Autonomous Bougainville Government in the lead-up to the planned independence of Bougainville in 2027. He visited Bougainville in November 2024 along with UN officials to meet with stakeholders in the region.

== Personal life ==
Mateparae has three children with his first wife, Raewynne, who died in 1990, and two with his second wife, Janine.

== Medals and awards ==
Viceregal styles of Sir Jerry Mateparae (2011–2016)
- Reference style: His Excellency Lieutenant General the Right Honourable
- Spoken style: Your Excellency

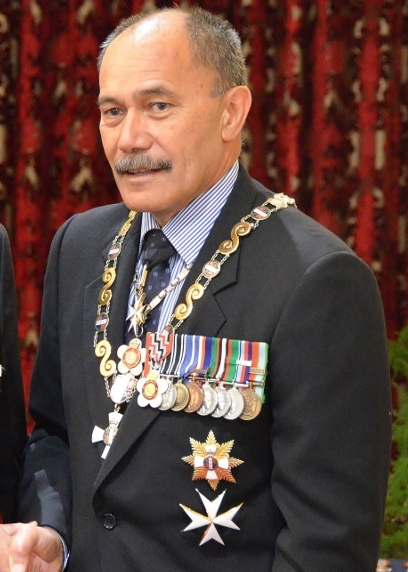
Mateparae wearing his medals

Mateparae has a Master of Arts with First Class Honours degree in international relations and strategic studies from the University of Waikato, and received a Distinguished Alumni Award from Waikato in 2008. He is a Fellow of the New Zealand Institute of Management.

Mateparae was appointed an Additional Officer of the New Zealand Order of Merit in the 1999 New Year Honours, for his service in Bougainville. In May 2011 the Singapore government awarded him the Darjah Utama Bakti Cemerlang (Tentera) – Distinguished Service Order (Military). In June 2011 he was awarded Knight of Justice of the Order of St John in regards to him becoming Prior of the Order of St John in New Zealand.

Knight Grand Companion of the New Zealand Order of Merit (2011); Officer of the New Zealand Order of Merit (1999)
Companion of the Queen's Service Order (2011)
Knight of Justice of the Order of St John (2011)
New Zealand Operational Service Medal
UNIFIL Medal
New Zealand General Service Medal 1992 (Non-Warlike)
East Timor Medal
New Zealand General Service Medal 2002 (Afghanistan)
New Zealand Armed Forces Award with clasp
New Zealand Defence Service Medal
Darjah Utama Bakti Cemerlang (Tentera)
US Navy and Marine Corps Presidential Unit Citation

=== Honorary degrees ===
Honorary degrees

Location	Date	School	Degree
New Zealand	12 May 2011	Massey University	Doctor of Literature (D.Litt)

== Dates of rank ==
Rank	Date	Role	Insignia
Private	1972		
Second Lieutenant	1976	Graduated from OCS Portsea	
Major	1985	B Company Commander, 1 RNZIR	
Lieutenant Colonel	1991–1994	Commanding Officer, 1 RNZIR	
Colonel	30 September 1996		
Brigadier	24 December 1999	Land Component Commander	
Major General	February 2002	Chief of Army	
Lieutenant General	1 May 2006	Chief of Defence Force	

== Arms ==
Coat of arms of Jerry Mateparae
Notes Jerry Mateparae, was granted armorial bearings with life supporters by the College of Arms on 9 April 2016, which consist of: Crest Upon a Helm with a Wreath Argent and Vert a Fantail or Piwakawaka wings extended fesswise the head lowered and the tail displayed upwards proper thereon five Mullets in cross Gules fimbriated Argent Mantled Argent Doubled Vert. Torse Gules and Argent Escutcheon Vert on a Fess invected Argent a Fess per fess indented of three points Gules and Sable thereon a Wave crested of three points each in the form of a Koru Argent all between three Whalebone Clubs or Kotiate bendwise sinister also Argent in the centre chief a Royal Crown proper. Supporters On the Dexter A European Woman proper vested in a long evening dress and wearing slippers Vert gorged with a cord also Vert pendant therefrom a greenstone pendant or Pounamu Kuru and holding in the dexter arm its head to the sinister a ginger and white Cat proper. On the Sinister A Māori vested in the uniform of a Lieutenant of the Royal New Zealand Infantry Regiment with collar badges wearing a Service Dress shirt and tie with a Sam Browne Belt hanging to the sinister therefrom an Infantry Officer's Sword on his head a Khaki Lemon Squeezer Hat proper the Puggaree thereon Khaki Gules and Khaki and worn over the shoulders a Māori Cloak or Kaitaka proper. Motto He Tāngata He Tāngata He Tāngata ("'It is the people' 'It is the people' 'It is the people'.") Orders Collar of The New Zealand Order of Merit with Badge appendant; Badge of a Companion of The Queen's Service Order; Badge of a Knight of Justice of the Most Venerable Order of St John of Jerusalem. Symbolism The overall design of the arms alludes to Jerry Mateparae's family, Māori or Iwi heritage, military and vice-regal roles. For the shield, the green colour and the kotiate represent the surname 'Mateparae', which means 'field' or 'battle field'. The kotiate are based on one from the Whanganui region, where Mateparae was born. The Whanganui River is symbolised by the fess invected or the wavy edges to the fess. The central portion of the fess was inspired by the ceremonial sash worn by the Chief of Army and the Chief of Defence Force which is based on a Māori tāniko weaving pattern. The three waves of koru represent the volcanic mountains of Ruapehu, Tongariro and Ngauruhoe all three of which are in the land of the Ngāti Tūwharetoa; one of Mateparae's tribal affiliations is with Ngāti Tūwharetoa. Philip O'Shea (New Zealand Herald Extraordinary) speculates that the three waves/mountains might also represent the name 'Jeremiah', which is generally symbolised by three rocks. The royal crown (St Edward's Crown) indicates that Mateparae was governor-general. It may also represent his long service to the Crown as a New Zealand Army officer. For the crest, the fantail or piwakawaka is Mateparae's favourite bird. The outstretched wings allude to the winged badge of the New Zealand Special Air Service (SAS) in which Mateparae served. The five mullets (stars) allude to the constellation of the Southern Cross and are similar to those on the New Zealand flag. The five mullets allude to his five children. The supporters, meanwhile, resemble Jerry Mateparare and his wife, Lady Janine Mateparae. the cat is based on the Mateparae family pet known as 'Boots', who was a common sight about Government House.

Military offices
Preceded by Bruce Ferguson	Chief of Defence Force; 2006–2011	Succeeded by Rhys Jones
Preceded by Maurice Dodson	Chief of Army; 2002–2006	Succeeded by Lou Gardiner
Government offices
Preceded by Sir Bruce Ferguson	Director of the Government Communications Security Bureau; 2011	Succeeded by Simon Murdoch; Acting
Preceded by Sir Anand Satyanand	Governor-General of New Zealand; 2011–2016	Succeeded by Dame Patsy Reddy
Diplomatic posts
Preceded by Sir Lockwood Smith	High Commissioner of New Zealand to the United Kingdom; 2017–2020	Succeeded by Bede Corry
