= Martyn Dunne =

Major General Martyn Dunne CNZM, QSO
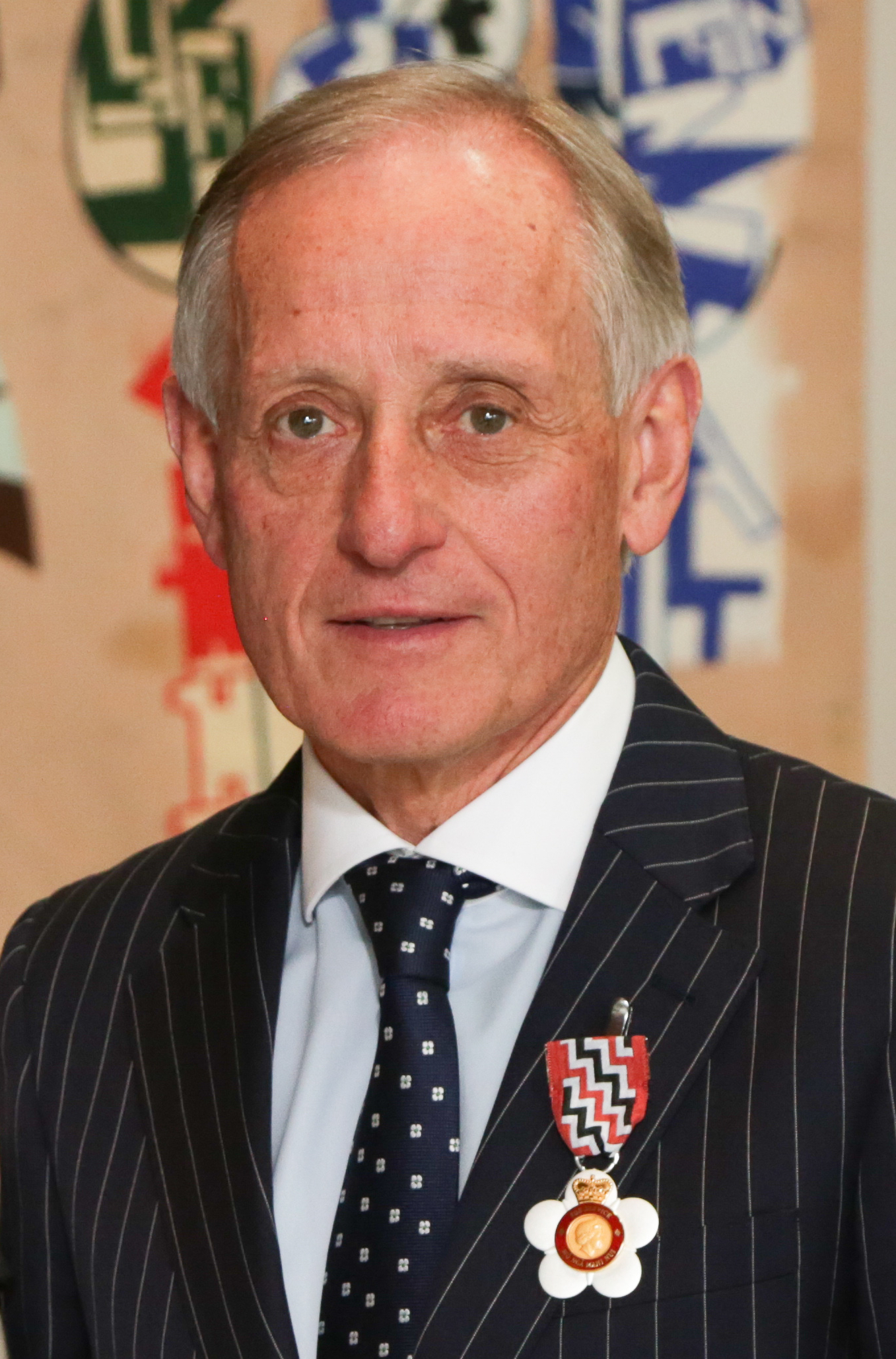
- Dunne in 2019

Chief Executive of the Ministry of Primary Industries
- In office 2013–2018

High Commissioner of New Zealand to Australia
- In office 2011–2013
- Preceded by: John Larkindale
- Succeeded by: Chris Seed

Comptroller of the New Zealand Customs Service
- In office 2004–2011

Personal details
- Born: Martyn John Dunne; 16 January 1950 (age 76) Auckland, New Zealand

Military service
- Allegiance: New Zealand
- Branch/service: New Zealand Army
- Years of service: 1970–2004
- Rank: Major General
- Commands: Commander Joint Forces New Zealand; Dili Command, International Force East Timor; Officer Cadet School, Waiouru
- Battles/wars: Operation Midford; International Force East Timor
- Awards: Companion of the New Zealand Order of Merit

Martyn John Dunne, CNZM, QSO (born 16 January 1950) is a retired New Zealand Army officer, diplomat and senior public servant. He was the chief executive of the Ministry for Primary Industries. From 2011 until 2013 he was New Zealand High Commissioner to Australia based in Canberra. He was Comptroller of Customs and Chief Executive of the New Zealand Customs Service (2004–2011) after a career as soldier in the New Zealand Army from 1970 ending his military career in 2004 as Commander Joint Forces New Zealand with the rank of major general. In September 1999, Dunne led the New Zealand Force East Timor during New Zealand's largest deployment since World War II, and as the Senior National Officer and, with the rank of brigadier, commanded the Dili Command, an operational formation in the International Force East Timor, until 2000.

== Early life ==
Dunne was born on 16 January 1950 in Auckland, New Zealand. He received his secondary education at St Peter's College, Auckland.

== Army career ==
Dunne began his military service with the Territorial Force of the New Zealand Army in 1971. He was transferred to the Regular Force in October 1977 at the rank of lieutenant, in the Royal New Zealand Infantry Regiment. He was posted to 1 Ranger Squadron, New Zealand Special Air Service, Papakura, and employed as a troop commander. As captain, he was deployed overseas with the New Zealand Army Truce Monitoring Contingent in South Rhodesia. In July 1989, Dunne was appointed commandant of the Officer Cadet School in Waiouru and promoted to lieutenant colonel. In September 1999 he was deployed with the New Zealand Force East Timor as the senior national officer. He was promoted to brigadier in October 1999 and commanded Dili Command, an operational formation in the International Force East Timor (INTERFET). In that capacity in East Timor, Dunne commanded New Zealand Forces and international troops during New Zealand's largest deployment since World War II. He was promoted to the rank of major general on 2 April 2001 prior to assuming his appointment as Commander Joint Forces New Zealand (COMJFNZ), which post he held until 2004.

Dunne is a graduate from the Australian College of Defence and Strategic Studies and from the Australian Command and Staff College. He has a Master of Arts degree in strategic studies from La Trobe University, Melbourne. He was made a Companion of the New Zealand Order of Merit in the 2000 Queen's Birthday Honours, following his service in East Timor.

== Public service ==
Dunne was comptroller and chief executive of the New Zealand Customs Service from September 2004 until March 2011. During his time with the New Zealand Customs Service, he has also served on a number of state sector leadership and advisory boards, including the Leadership Development Centre. In June 2008, Dunne was elected chairperson of the World Customs Organisation (WCO), an intergovernmental organisation headquartered in Brussels, Belgium. He continued this role throughout his service with New Zealand Customs. In March 2011, Dunne became New Zealand High Commissioner to Australia a position he held until October 2013. He was then appointed chief executive of the Ministry for Primary Industries beginning on 18 November 2013. He retired from the MPI role in 2018.

Dunne was appointed a Companion of the Queen's Service Order, for services to the State, in the 2019 New Year Honours.

== Honours and awards ==

Companion of the New Zealand Order of Merit (CNZM)	2000
Companion of the Queen's Service Order (QSO)	2019
New Zealand Operational Service Medal	
East Timor Medal	
New Zealand Armed Forces Award	
New Zealand Defence Service Medal with 3 clasps	Regular, Territorial & National Service
Rhodesia Medal	
International Force East Timor Medal (Australia)	

== Notes ==
Military offices
New title	Commander Joint Forces New Zealand; 2001–2004	Succeeded by Air Vice Marshal Graham Lintott
Diplomatic posts
Preceded by John Larkindale	New Zealand High Commissioner to Australia; 2011–2013	Succeeded by Chris Seed
