= Rhys Jones (soldier) =

Zealand army officer (born 1960)

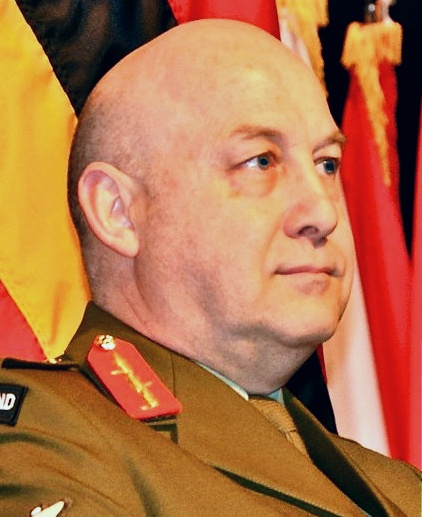
- Jones in 2010
- Born: 2 May 1960 (age 66); Timaru, New Zealand
- Military career
- Allegiance: New Zealand
- Branch: New Zealand Army
- Service years: 1978–2014
- Rank: Lieutenant General
- Commands: Chief of the Defence Force; Chief of Army; Joint Forces New Zealand; Queen Alexandra's Mounted Rifles; 3 Land Force Group
- Awards: Companion of the New Zealand Order of Merit

Lieutenant General Richard Rhys Jones CNZM (born 2 May 1960) is a retired senior New Zealand Army officer, who was the Chief of the New Zealand Defence Force from 2011 to 2014. He was succeeded by Lieutenant General Tim Keating.

== Early life ==
Jones was born in Timaru and is the son of Methodist minister Alan Jones. Jones is the youngest in a family of nine, six in his immediate family plus three half-brothers including writer Owen Marshall Jones. He is a former pupil of Wanganui Boys' College.

== Military career ==
Jones enlisted in the New Zealand Army in December 1978, and attended the Royal Military College, Duntroon in Canberra from 1979 to 1982, graduating as a Bachelor of Arts, having majored in politics. In December 1982, he entered the Royal New Zealand Armoured Corps as a lieutenant. He then spent nine years at Waiouru Army Camp followed by ten years intermittently in Australia. He was posted to the Middle East as an observer with the United Nations Truce Supervision Organization, and with the Observer Group Lebanon as an operations officer.

Jones is a 1992 graduate of the United States Army Command and General Staff College at Fort Leavenworth, and was inducted into the USACGSC International Hall of Fame in October 2010. He attended the higher defence college at the Australian Defence College, completed a Master of Arts in Strategic Studies at La Trobe University, and has a Diploma in Qualitative Futures.

In 2000, he had "some disagreements with the chief of army at that time" over armoured vehicles, was sent away to Australia and told he would receive no further promotions, but was later brought back. By 2005 he was a colonel at Burnham Military Camp. Jones was promoted from brigadier to major general in October 2007 and appointed Commander Joint Forces New Zealand after serving as the Land Component Commander. On 1 May 2009, he succeeded Major General Lou Gardiner as the Chief of Army.

Prime Minister John Key announced on 6 December 2010 that Jones would be the next Chief of the New Zealand Defence Force, appointing him for a three-year term rather than the usual five to monitor progress in a major review of defence force spending. The appointment commenced on 24 January 2011.

In September 2013, the government announced that Jones' term would not be extended by two years to a five-year term, as was done with previous heads of defence, and he would be stood down in January 2014. He was appointed a Companion of the New Zealand Order of Merit for services to the State in the 2014 New Year Honours, just prior to his retirement.

As of May 2017, he was appointed Chief executive of Fire and Emergency New Zealand, and commenced in this role with the organisation's establishment on 1 July 2017.

Military offices
Preceded by Lieutenant General Jerry Mateparae	Chief of the New Zealand Defence Force; 2011–2014	Succeeded by Lieutenant General Tim Keating
Preceded by Major General Lou Gardiner	Chief of Army; 2009–2011	Succeeded by Major General Tim Keating
Preceded by Rear Admiral Jack Steer	Commander Joint Forces New Zealand; 2007–2009	Succeeded by Air Vice Marshal Peter Stockwell
