= Tim Keating (soldier) =

New Zealand Army officer

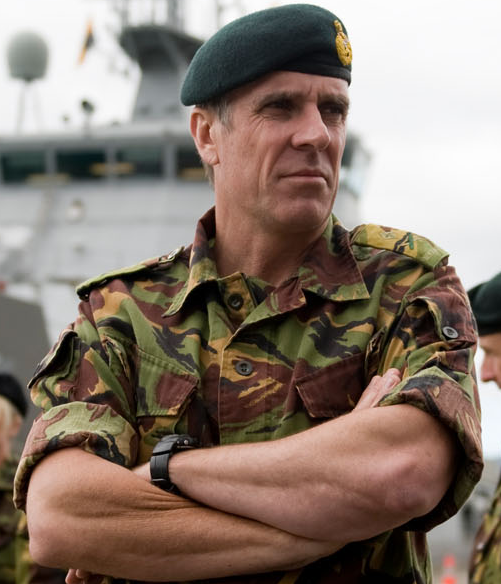
- Lieutenant General Keating in 2016
- Military career
- Allegiance: New Zealand
- Branch: New Zealand Army
- Service years: 1982–2018
- Rank: Lieutenant General
- Commands: Chief of the Defence Force (2014–18); Vice Chief of Defence Force (2012–14); Chief of Army (2011–12); 2nd Land Force Group (2007–09); CRIB 6 (2005); Officer Cadet School (2001–04); 1st New Zealand Special Air Services Group (1999–01)
- Conflicts: Multinational Force and Observers; War in Afghanistan
- Awards: Companion of the New Zealand Order of Merit; Commander of the Legion of Merit (United States)

Lieutenant General Timothy James Keating CNZM is a former New Zealand Army officer and Chief of the New Zealand Defence Force. He was appointed Chief of Defence Force in 2014, immediately following his tenure as Vice Chief of Defence Force. He served as Chief of Army from 2011 to 2012.

Keating served as Commander, Crib Rotation 6, the Provincial Reconstruction Team, in the early years of the deployment to Bamiyan, Afghanistan.

Keating was promoted to lieutenant general and took over as Chief of Defence Force (CDF) for a three-year term on 1 February 2014. On 3 April 2018 Keating announced he would be stepping down as CDF on the completion of his term on 30 June. Keating did not give a reason for his resignation, but said he was not standing down due to the allegations about Operation Burnham in 2010 which was the subject of the book Hit & Run. Keating was succeeded as CDF by Air Marshal Kevin Short on 1 July 2018.

== Honours ==
In the 2008 Queen's Birthday Honours, Keating was appointed a Member of the New Zealand Order of Merit. He was promoted to Companion of the New Zealand Order of Merit in the 2019 New Year Honours.

Military offices
Preceded by Lieutenant General Rhys Jones	Chief of Defence Force; 2014–2018	Succeeded by Air Marshal Kevin Short
Preceded by Rear Admiral Jack Steer	Vice Chief of Defence Force; 2012–2014	Succeeded by Air Vice Marshal Kevin Short
Preceded by Major General Rhys Jones	Chief of Army; 2011–2012	Succeeded by Major General Dave Gawn
