= Lou Gardiner =

New Zealand officer

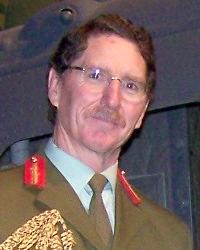
- Gardiner in 2009
- Born: 4 August 1952; Wellington, New Zealand
- Died: 18 July 2015 (aged 62); Upper Hutt, New Zealand
- Military career
- Allegiance: New Zealand
- Branch: New Zealand Army
- Service years: 1971–2009
- Rank: Major General
- Commands: Chief of Army (2006–09); Commander Joint Forces New Zealand (2004–06); Land Commander (1998–99); 1st Base Supply Battalion (1990–94)
- Conflicts: Somalia; East Timor
- Awards: Officer of the New Zealand Order of Merit
- Other work: Chief executive, Crimestoppers New Zealand

Major General Louis Joseph Gardiner ONZM (4 August 1952 – 18 July 2015) was a New Zealand military officer. He served as Chief of Army from 2006 to 2009, and later was the chief executive of Crimestoppers New Zealand.

== Early life and family ==
Born in Wellington in 1952, Gardiner was the son of Shirley and Dan Gardiner. He received his secondary education at St Patrick's College, Wellington.

== Military career ==
After enlisting in the New Zealand Army in 1971, Gardiner attended the Royal Military College, Duntroon in Canberra, graduating as a Bachelor of Arts in 1975, having majored in economics and geography. He then entered the Royal New Zealand Army Ordnance Corps, and later served in the Army Office, Canberra. In December 1990 he was appointed commanding officer of the 1st Base Supply Battalion, with the rank of lieutenant colonel. He was posted to the United Nations Operations in Somalia, Headquarters of the Peacekeeping Force, as deputy chief logistical officer in 1994, and the following year he returned to New Zealand and was promoted to colonel, assuming the position of Chief of Staff, Support Command. After completing a degree in human resource management, and attending the Australian College of Defence and Strategic Studies in Canberra, Gardiner was appointed director of resource policy and plans at the New Zealand Defence Force headquarters in late 1997. He was promoted to brigadier in December 1998 and appointed deputy Chief of Staff, but was appointed Land Commander a week later. He was reappointed deputy Chief of Staff in December 1999 and the following July he received a 12-month posting as chief military observer with the United Nations Transitional Administration in East Timor. He was appointed Head New Zealand Defence Staff, Canberra, in 2001.

In the 2004 New Year Honours, Gardiner was appointed an additional Officer of the New Zealand Order of Merit, in recognition of his military operational service.

Gardiner was promoted to the rank of major general and appointed Commander Joint Forces New Zealand in late 2004. He served as Chief of Army from May 2006 to May 2009.

== Later life ==
Following his retirement from the New Zealand Defence Force, Gardiner was the chief executive of Crimestoppers New Zealand. In 2014 he was appointed director of leadership at Scots College in Wellington. He died of cancer on 18 July 2015, and was buried at Akatarawa Cemetery.

Military offices
| Preceded by Major General Jerry Mateparae | Chief of Army; 2006–2009 | Succeeded by Major General Rhys Jones |
| Preceded by Air Vice Marshal Graham Lintott | Commander Joint Forces New Zealand; 2004–2006 | Succeeded by Rear Admiral Jack Steer |
