= Anthony Birks =

New Zealand army general (1941-2002)

- Born: 30 December 1941
- Died: 21 January 2002 (aged 60)
- Military career
- Allegiance: New Zealand
- Branch: New Zealand Army
- Service years: 1961–1999
- Rank: Lieutenant General
- Nickname: Tony
- Commands: Chief of Defence Force; Chief of the General Staff; 3rd Task Force; 2/1st Battalion, Royal New Zealand Infantry Regiment
- Conflicts: Indonesia–Malaysia confrontation Vietnam War
- Awards: Companion of the Order of the Bath; Officer of the Order of the British Empire

Lieutenant General Anthony Leonard Birks, CB, OBE (30 December 1941 – 21 January 2002) was a senior officer in the New Zealand Army. He served as the Chief of the General Staff, the professional head of the New Zealand Army, from 1992 to 1995, and in New Zealand's most senior military post as Chief of Defence Force from 1995 until his retirement in 1999.

== Biography ==
Born in Wellington, New Zealand, on 30 December 1941, Anthony Birks, known as Tony, attended St. Andrew's College, in Christchurch, and then went onto Nelson College. In 1959 Birks entered the Royal Military Academy in Sandhurst in the United Kingdom, and on completion of his studies two years later was commissioned as a second lieutenant in the New Zealand Army. He served as a platoon commander with the Royal New Zealand Infantry Regiment (RNZIR) in Malaysia, during the Indonesia–Malaysia confrontation. In 1968, he served in South Vietnam as a liaison officer to the 1st Australian Task Force. In 1970, he served with the United States forces on attachment, posted to a field force headquarters. He received further military education at the Australian Army Staff College, and then went on to command an infantry battalion of the RNZIR at Burnham Military Camp.

In the 1978 New Year Honours, Birks was appointed a Member of the Order of the British Empire (Military Division). From 1985 to 1990, he was commander of the 3rd Task Force, and during this time he was promoted to Officer of the Order of the British Empire in the 1987 Queen's Birthday Honours.

He spent a period of time in the United Kingdom studying at the Royal College of Defence Studies before becoming Chief of the General Staff, with the rank of major general, in 1992. During his time in this role, he strengthened the combat capacity of the New Zealand Army. In the 1994 New Year Honours, he was made a Companion of the Order of the Bath. In 1995, he was promoted to lieutenant general and became Chief of the Defence Force, and worked towards updating the equipment of all three branches of the military. During his time in the role, which ended in 1999, he also dealt with gender discrimination.

On his retirement in February 1999, he moved to the Bay of Plenty. He died of a heart attack on 21 January 2002 in Whakatāne and was given a full military burial with 400 attendees and an honour guard at Waiouru. A private ceremony followed in Taupō, and his remains were cremated. He was survived by his wife Georgina, who he met during his time in Malaysia, and the couple's children.

== Notes ==
Military offices
Preceded by Vice Admiral Sir Somerford Teagle	Chief of Defence Force; 1995–1999	Succeeded by Air Marshal Carey Adamson
Preceded by Major General Bruce Meldrum	Chief of the General Staff; 1992–1995	Succeeded by Major General Piers Reid
