= Headquarters Joint Forces New Zealand =

Operational headquarters of the New Zealand Defence Force

- Active: 2001–current
- Country: New Zealand
- Garrison/HQ: Trentham Military Camp

Headquarters Joint Forces New Zealand (HQ JFNZ) is the New Zealand Defence Force's (NZDF's) operational level headquarters and is responsible for the command and control of NZDF operations worldwide. It was established in 2001 at Trentham Military Camp to support the Commander Joint Forces New Zealand (COMJFNZ).

== History and role ==
HQ JFNZ was established on 1 July 2001 to replace the NZDF's three service-specific operational headquarters (Air Command, Land Command, and the Maritime Commander New Zealand). It has responsibility for commanding NZDF units deployed on operations, as well as those undertaking major training operations. The COMJFNZ reports directly to the Chief of Defence Force, and HQ JFNZ is staffed by members of all three armed services. The heads of the Royal New Zealand Navy, New Zealand Army and Royal New Zealand Air Force are responsible for training and sustaining combat forces, which are then assigned to the COMJFNZ during exercises and deployments.

As of 2005, HQ JFNZ comprised the following sub-elements:

- Joint Command Division
- Joint Plans and Development Division
- Joint Operations Division
- Joint Support Division

Also resident within the headquarters are the Maritime Component Commander, the Land Component Commander (New Zealand), and the Air Component Commander. Air Component Commanders at HQ JFNZ have included Air Commodores Steve Moore (until 2013) and Kevin McEvoy (2013–).
