= Graham Lintott =

RNZAF Air Vice Marshal (born 1955)

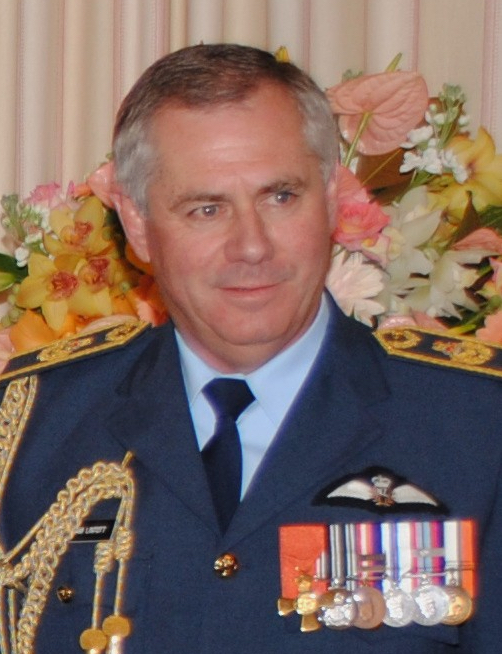
- Lintott in 2010
- Born: 29 March 1955 (age 71); Canterbury, New Zealand
- Military career
- Allegiance: New Zealand
- Branch: Royal New Zealand Air Force
- Service years: 1973–2014
- Rank: Air Vice Marshal
- Commands: Chief of Air Force (2006–11); Commander Joint Forces New Zealand (2004); Air Component Commander (2002–04); RNZAF Base Ohakea (1998–00)
- Conflicts: Multinational Force and Observers
- Awards: Officer of the New Zealand Order of Merit

Air Vice Marshal Graham Brian Lintott, ONZM (born 29 March 1955) is a retired senior commander in the Royal New Zealand Air Force (RNZAF) and former Chief of Air Force. He is now the Managing Director of Strategy and Business Development for Lockheed Martin's New Zealand operation.

== Early life ==
Lintott was born in Canterbury, New Zealand, on 29 March 1955, the only son of three children to Brian, a school teacher, and Heather Lintott. When Graham was aged four, the family moved to Ruakiwi, a small regional town northwest of Hamilton, where the Lintott children were educated at the local school by their father. The family later relocated to Huinga, Taranaki, before returning to Hamilton where Lintott attended Hamilton Boys' High School from 1968. Aged 15, Lintott began flying lessons through the Waikato Aero Club after winning $700 in the Golden Kiwi.

== Career ==
Lintott joined the RNZAF in 1973 and graduated from pilot training in 1975. He completed the Basic Sioux Helicopter Course and the Bell UH-1 Iroquois Course, before completing tours with No. 3 Squadron RNZAF and RNZAF Support Unit Singapore.

In the 1980s, Lintott was a member of the RNZAF Red Checkers formation aerobatics team.

Military offices
Preceded by Air Vice Marshal John Hamilton	Chief of Air Force; 2006–2011	Succeeded by Air Vice Marshal Peter Stockwell
Preceded by Major General Martyn Dunne	Commander Joint Forces New Zealand; 2004	Succeeded by Major General Lou Gardiner
