= Carey Adamson =

Royal New Zealand Air Force officer (1942–2019)

- Born: Carey William Adamson; 5 September 1942; Fairlie, New Zealand
- Died: 10 May 2019 (aged 76)
- Military career
- Allegiance: New Zealand
- Branch: Royal New Zealand Air Force
- Service years: 1961–2001
- Rank: Air Marshal
- Commands: Chief of Defence Force; Chief of the Air Staff; No. 40 Squadron RNZAF
- Conflicts: Vietnam War
- Awards: Companion of the New Zealand Order of Merit; Air Force Cross

Air Marshal Carey William Adamson, CNZM, AFC (5 September 1942 – 10 May 2019) was a senior officer of the Royal New Zealand Air Force.

Adamson grew up in Fairlie before attending Timaru Boys' High School, where he was a boarder apart from his final year, when he commuted daily on his motorcycle. As a teenager, Adamson joined the Air Training Corps. He then joined the Royal New Zealand Air Force in 1961, where he served as a pilot flying Austers and Harvards. In 1964 Adamson was assigned to the United States to train on the C130 Hercules.

He was Chief of the Air Staff from 1995 to 1999 and Chief of Defence Force from 1999 to 2001. In 2002, he caused "unprecedented controversy" when he criticised the government for disestablishing the air combat force.

In the 1979 Queen's Birthday Honours, Adamson was awarded the Air Force Cross. In the 1999 New Year Honours, he was appointed a Companion of the New Zealand Order of Merit.

Adamson was predeceased by his wife, Denyce (née Pickens), in 2013. He had Parkinson's disease for the last few years of his life, and died on 10 May 2019. He received a military funeral at Wellington Cathedral of St Paul.

Military offices
Preceded by Lieutenant General Anthony Birks	Chief of Defence Force; 1999–2001	Succeeded by Air Marshal Bruce Ferguson
Preceded by Air Vice Marshal John Hosie	Chief of the Air Staff; 1995–1999	Succeeded by Air Vice Marshal Don Hamilton
