= Defence Act 1990 =

Act of Parliament in New Zealand

New Zealand Parliament
- Long title: An Act— (a) to continue to authorise the raising and maintaining of armed forces for certain purposes; and (b) to constitute the New Zealand Defence Force, comprising— (i) the Armed Forces under the command of the Chief of Defence Force; and (ii) the Civil Staff under the control of the Chief of Defence Force; and (c) to reaffirm that the Armed Forces are under Ministerial authority; and (d) to define the respective roles and relationships of the Minister of Defence, the Secretary of Defence, and the Chief of Defence Force; and (e) to redefine the relationship of the Chief of Defence Force to the Chiefs of Service; and (f) to make provision generally in respect of the establishment, control, and activities of the New Zealand Defence Force, and related matters
- Citation: 1990 No 28
- Enacted by: House of Representatives
- Royal assent: 1 April 1990
- Commenced: 1 April 1990
- Administered by: Ministry of Defence

Amended by
- 2007
- Status: Current legislation

The Defence Act 1990 is an Act of Parliament in New Zealand which establishes the New Zealand Defence Force (NZDF) and defines the respective roles of, and relationships between, the minister of defence, the chief of defence force and the secretary of defence.

== Background ==
Under previous legislation, the three services—New Zealand Army, Royal New Zealand Navy and Royal New Zealand Air Force—were part of the Ministry of Defence. Post-1990, the Ministry of Defence is a separate policy-making body under a secretary of defence; the chief of defence force and secretary of defence (head of the ministry) have both separate and shared responsibilities.

== Provisions ==
=== Part 1: Constitution of armed forces ===
The Act constitutes the armed forces "in the name and on behalf of the Sovereign" and grants the governor-general the power of the raise armed forces. The governor-general is, under the Letters Patent 1983, commander-in-chief of New Zealand. The Defence Act greatly restricts the powers of the commander-in-chief, unlike the US president as commander-in-chief for example.

The Act then states that the minister of defence: "...shall have the power of control of the New Zealand Defence Force, which shall be exercised through the Chief of Defence Force."

=== Part 2: The New Zealand Defence Force ===
The Act defines the different services of New Zealand Defence Forces:

- Royal New Zealand Navy
- New Zealand Army
- Royal New Zealand Air Force

And various reserve and territorial services.

=== Part 3: Secretary of defence, chief of Defence Force, and chiefs of service ===
The Act defines the secretary of defence as the chief executive of the Ministry of Defence, the chief of Defence Force as "principal military adviser to the Minister and other Ministers" and the other chiefs of the services of the defence force.

=== Part 4: Terms and conditions of service ===
Section 34 of the Act defines the Armed forces oath.
