= Kevin Short (RNZAF officer) =

New Zealand air force officer

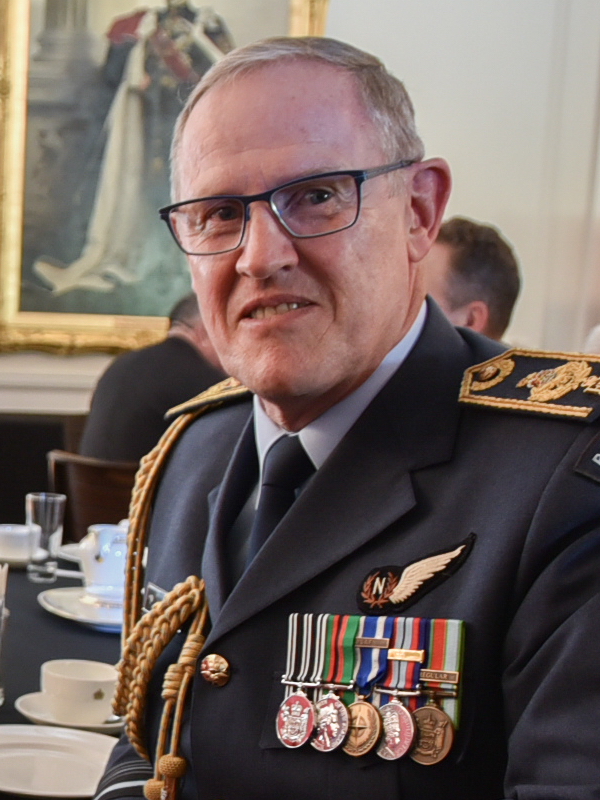
- Short in 2021
- Military career
- Allegiance: New Zealand
- Branch: Royal New Zealand Air Force
- Service years: 1976–2024
- Rank: Air Marshal
- Commands: Chief of Defence Force (2018–2024); Vice Chief of Defence Force (2014–2018); Commander Joint Forces New Zealand (2013–2014); Deputy Chief of Air Force (2011–13); Provincial Reconstruction Team (2006); No. 485 Wing (2003–2006)
- Conflicts: War in Afghanistan
- Awards: Companion of the New Zealand Order of Merit; Officer of the Order of Australia; Commander of the Legion of Merit (United States)

Air Marshal Kevin Ronald Short, CNZM is a retired Royal New Zealand Air Force officer. He served as Chief of Defence Force from 1 July 2018 to 6 June 2024.

Short joined the Air Force in 1976. He served as Commander, Crib Rotation 9, the Provincial Reconstruction Team, in the early years of New Zealand's deployment to Bamiyan, Afghanistan.

In June 2011, Short was appointed Deputy Chief of Air Force, before being appointed Commander Joint Forces New Zealand from 25 February 2013. He assumed the role of Vice Chief of Defence Force on 31 March 2014. After four years in the post, Short was promoted air marshal and succeeded Lieutenant General Tim Keating as Chief of Defence Force on 1 July 2018. Short was succeeded by Air Marshal Tony Davies as Chief of Defence Force on 6 June 2024.

== Honours and awards ==
On 6 July 2022, Short was appointed an Honorary Officer of the Order of Australia for his "distinguished service in fostering the military relationship between Australia and New Zealand through exceptional leadership, unwavering commitment, strategic foresight and uncompromising professionalism".

On 6 April 2024, Short was awarded the Legion of Merit in the degree of Commander. The award was presented by Admiral John C. Aquilino, Commander of the United States Indo-Pacific Command.

In the 2024 King’s Birthday Honours, Short was appointed a Companion of the New Zealand Order of Merit, for services to the New Zealand Defence Force.

Military offices
Preceded by Lieutenant General Tim Keating	Chief of Defence Force; 2018–2024	Succeeded by Air Marshall Tony Davies
Preceded by Major General Tim Keating	Vice Chief of Defence Force; 2014–2018	Succeeded by Air Vice Marshal Tony Davies
Preceded by Major General Dave Gawn	Commander Joint Forces New Zealand; 2013–2014	Succeeded by Major General Tim Gall
