= Matt Weston =

Matt Weston is the name of:

- Matt Weston (football coach) (born 1975), English football coach
- Matt Weston (skeleton racer) (born 1997), English skeleton racer
