= New Zealand Defence Force =

Combined military forces of New Zealand

- Te Ope Kātua o Aotearoa (Māori)
- The NZDF Tri-Service logo
- Founded: 1909 (117 years ago)
- Current form: 1990
- Service branches: Royal New Zealand Navy; New Zealand Army; Royal New Zealand Air Force
- Headquarters: Defence House, Wellington
- Website: nzdf.mil.nz/nzdf/

Leadership
- Head of the Armed Forces: King Charles III
- Commander in Chief: Governor-General Cindy Kiro
- Prime Minister: Christopher Luxon
- Minister of Defence: Paul Goldsmith
- Chief of Defence Force: Vacant (Since 23/10/2026) - Rear Admiral Mat Williams (Acting)

Personnel
- Military age: 17 with parental consent; cannot be deployed until 18 (As of September 2017); 18 for voluntary service
- Active personnel: 10,037 (June 2024)
- Reserve personnel: 3,281 (June 2024)

Expenditure
- Budget: Total budget for 2025/26; Vote Defence Force (NZD) $5,193,270,000
- Percent of GDP: 1.3%

Related articles
- History: Military history of New Zealand
- Ranks: New Zealand military ranks

The New Zealand Defence Force (NZDF; Māori: Te Ope Kātua o Aotearoa, lit. "Line of Defence of New Zealand") is the three-branched military of New Zealand. The NZDF is responsible for the protection of the national security of New Zealand and its realm, promoting its interests, safeguarding peace and security, as well as supporting peacekeeping and humanitarian missions. It consists of three services: the Royal New Zealand Navy (RNZN), the New Zealand Army and the Royal New Zealand Air Force (RNZAF), as well as tri-service components. As of June 2024, the NZDF has a strength of 15,383 employees, consisting of 10,037 regular force personnel, 3,281 reserve force personnel and 3,294 civilian members. It is supported by the New Zealand Ministry of Defence (MOD) and is commanded by the Chief of Defence Force (CDF).

The principal roles and tasks expected of the NZDF is to provide a combat capable force to defend New Zealand's sovereign territory, and protect critical lines of communication. To provide civil defence support, meet whole-of-government security objectives, as well as commitments to allies and partners, support government agencies, protect and promote regional peace, security and resilience in the South Pacific, and uphold the international rules-based order.

The NZDF delivers military effects in support of New Zealand’s national security objectives. It follows a government set defence policy framework that defines its principles, outcomes and priorities. The NZDF is a critical component of New Zealand’s national security system. New Zealand takes an "all-hazards" approach to national security that brings government agencies together to respond to all risks to national security, whether internal or external, human, natural or artificial.

The commander-in-chief is the Governor-General (as the representative of the King of New Zealand). Control of the NZDF is under the Minister of Defence, under the Defence Act 1990. The current Governor-General is Cindy Kiro, and the Minister of Defence is Paul Goldsmith.

Air Marshal Tony Davies was appointed Chief of Defence Force on 6 June 2024.

== History ==
=== Militia (1845–1886) ===
After the Treaty of Waitangi in 1840, New Zealand's security was dependent on British Imperial troops deployed from Australia and other parts of the empire. By 1841 the settlers, particularly those in the New Zealand Company settlement of Wellington, were calling for local militia to be formed. In 1843 a local militia had been formed in Wellington without official sanction. This prompted the Chief Police Magistrate Major Matthew Richmond to order its immediate disbandment. Richmond also dispatched 53 soldiers from the 96th Regiment from Auckland to Wellington.

These calls for a militia continued to grow with the Wairau Affray, the start of the New Zealand Wars. The calls eventually led to a bill being introduced to the Legislative Council in 1844. Those present noted their disapproval of the bill, unanimously deferring it for six months. On 22 March 1845 the Flagstaff War broke out, which proved to be the catalyst for passing the Bill.

In 1844 a Select Committee of the House of Commons had recommended that a militia, composed of both settlers and native Maori, and a permanent native force be set up.

On 25 March 1845, the Militia Ordinance was passed into law. Twenty-six officers were appointed in Auckland, thereby forming the start of New Zealand's own defence force. Major Richmond was appointed the commander of the Wellington Battalion of the militia. The newspaper article of the time notes that Wellington had a mounted Volunteer Corp. The Nelson Battalion of Militia was formed 12 August 1845.

In June 1845, 75 members of the Auckland Militia under Lieutenant Figg became the first unit to support British Imperial troops in the Flagstaff War, serving as pioneers. Seven militia were wounded in action between 30 June and 1 July 1845. One, a man named Rily, later died of his wounds. The Auckland Militia was disbanded in August or early September 1845 because of budgetary constraints. Disbandment of the Nelson and Wellington Militias followed much to the dismay of their supporters. Those at Nelson under Captain Greenwood decided, regardless of pay or not, to continue training.

Trouble in the Hutt Valley, near Wellington, in early March 1846 prompted the new Governor George Grey to proclaim martial law and call out the Hutt Militia, in what became known as the Hutt Valley campaign. Following on from this the local paper noted that the No 1 Company of the Wellington Militia had been called out, while the troops stationed in the town had been in the Hutt. The paper further noted that Grey intended to maintain two companies of Militia in Wellington. As problems continued in the area at least 160 Militia remained. These were supplemented by volunteers and Māori warriors from the Te Aro pā.

==== Armed Constabulary ====
On 28 October 1846, with the passing of the Armed Constabulary Ordinance in 1846, a fresh call was made by Mr Donnelly of the Legislature to do away with the Militia because of its expense. The cost to Britain of maintaining a military force in New Zealand was considerable, prompting a dispatch on 24 November 1846 from The Right Hon Earl Grey to advise Lieutenant Governor George Grey that

the formation of a well-organised Militia and of a force of Natives in the service of Her Majesty, would appear to be the measures most likely to be successfully adopted.

Further pressure in the early 1850s from Britain for removing their forces prompted pleas for them to remain as the Militia were deemed insufficient for the purpose.

1854 brought a new threat to the attention of the colony because up to that time the military focus had been upon internal conflicts between settlers and the Māori. War had broken out between Russia and Turkey. This war began to involve the major European powers and exposed New Zealand and Australia to a possible external threat from the Imperial Russian Navy. Parliament discussed providing guns at ports around the country for use in the event of a war with a foreign power.

By 1858 attention had swung back to local issues with a land dispute in New Plymouth prompting Governor Thomas Gore Browne to call out its militia under Captain Charles Brown. A prelude to what was to become the First Taranaki War and a period of conflict in the North Island until 1872.

The newly formed New Zealand Parliament revised and expanded the Militia Ordinance, replacing it with the Militia Act 1858. Some of the main changes were clauses enabling volunteers to be included under such terms and conditions as the Governor may specify. The act also outlined the purposes under which Militia could be called upon, including invasion. Debates in Parliament had included expressions of concern about Russian naval expansion in the northern Pacific, pointed out that the sole naval defence consisted of one 24-gun frigate, and the time it would take for Britain to come to the colony's aid.

British Imperial troops remained in New Zealand until February 1870, during the later stage of the New Zealand Wars, by which time settler units had replaced them.

The Defence Act 1886 reclassified the militia as volunteers. These were the forerunners of the Territorials.

=== Volunteers (1858–1909) ===
Although there were informal volunteer units as early as 1845, the appropriate approval and regulation of the units did not occur until the Militia Act 1858. Those who signed up for these units were exempt from militia duty, but had to be prepared to serve anywhere in New Zealand. One of the earliest gazetted units (13 January 1859) was the Taranaki Volunteer Rifle Company.

To the Volunteer Rifle Corps were added Volunteer Artillery Corps in mid-1859. The first of these Volunteer Artillery Corps were based in Auckland.

By late 1859 the number of volunteer units was so great that Captain H C Balneavis was appointed Deputy Adjunct-General, based at Auckland.

=== Colonial Defence Force (1862–1867) ===
In 1863 the government passed the Colonial Defence Force Act 1862 creating the first Regular Force. This was to be a mounted body of not more than 500 troops, with both Maori and settlers, and costing no more than 30,000 pounds per annum. All were volunteers and expected to serve for three years.

Formation of the first unit did not begin until early April 1863, with 100 men being sought at New Plymouth under Captain Atkinson. Hawke's Bay was to have the next unit. By late April, papers were reporting few had enlisted in New Plymouth.

Formation of an Auckland unit under Colonel Nixon commenced in July and by the 14th had 30 men.

==== Authorised units by July 1863 ====
Commander: Major-General Galloway

Location	Authorised	Actual	Commander
Auckland	100	50	Lieutenant Colonel Marmaduke George Nixon
Ahuriri (Hawke's Bay)	100	100	Major George Stoddart Whitmore
New Plymouth	100	-	Captain Harry Albert Atkinson
Otago	50		Mr Branigan
Wairarapa	50		
Wellington	100		James Townsend Edwards

By October 1863 there was no Wairarapa-based defence force, and 50 were based in Wanganui. The Otago force had earlier been moved to Wellington, with further Otago volunteers heading for the Auckland and Hawke's Bay Units. The total Defence Force numbered 375 by 3 November 1863.

In October 1864 the Government decided to reduce the numbers in the Colonial Defence Force to 75 with three units of 25 members each in Wellington, Hawkes Bay and Taranaki. By this time there were about 10,000 British Imperial troops in New Zealand, supplemented by about as many New Zealand volunteer and militia forces. There were calls, particularly from South Island papers, for the British Imperial troops to be replaced by local forces. Parliamentary debates in late 1864 also supported this view, especially as the cost of maintaining the Imperial troops was becoming a greater financial burden on the colony.

==== Defence review, March 1865 ====
At the request of the governor in January 1865 a formal statement on the defence of the colony was presented on 20 March 1865. This proposed an armed constabulary force supported by friendly natives, volunteer units, and militia as the case may require be established to take the place of the Imperial troops. The proposed force was to consist of 1,350 Europeans and 150 Maori – 1,500 in total. They were to be divided into 30 companies of 50 men each based as follows:

Province	Location	Number
Auckland	Queens Redoubt south, between the Waikato and Waipa Rivers	6
	From the Bluff to Pukorokoro	3
	In reserve at Papakura or vicinity	3
	Tauranga	1
Taranaki and Wellington	Taranaki and Wanganui Districts	12
	Wellington	1
Hawke's Bay	Napier	4

The total Defence budget, which included purchasing a steamer for use on the Waikato, Patea, and Wanganui rivers, was 187,000 pounds per annum. The budget's focus was solely on internal conflict. The issue of external conflict did not begin to resurface until the following year, with thought being given again to coastal defences.

The Colonial Defence Force was disbanded in October 1867 by the Armed Constabulary Act 1867. Its members transferred to the Armed Constabulary.

=== Evolution of volunteers and militia ===
From 1863 to 1867 Forest Ranger volunteer units were formed, tasked with searching out Maori war parties, acting as scouts, and protecting lines of communication. They arose out of the need to prevent ambushes and random attacks on civilians near forest areas. The Rangers were well armed and more highly paid. These units used guerrilla style tactics, moving through areas under cover of darkness and ambushing war parties. The Forest Rangers were disbanded on 1 October 1867.

See New Zealand Police

Alongside the militia and the British Imperial forces were the Armed Constabulary. The Armed Constabulary were formed in 1846 with the passage of the Armed Constabulary Ordinance. The Constabulary's role was both regular law enforcement and during the New Zealand Wars militia support. From 1867 to 1886 the Armed Constabulary were the only permanent force in New Zealand. In 1886 the militia functions of the Armed Constabulary were transferred to the New Zealand Permanent Militia by the Defence Act 1886. Lieutenant Colonel John Roberts was the Permanent Militia's first commander from January 1887 to his retirement in 1888.

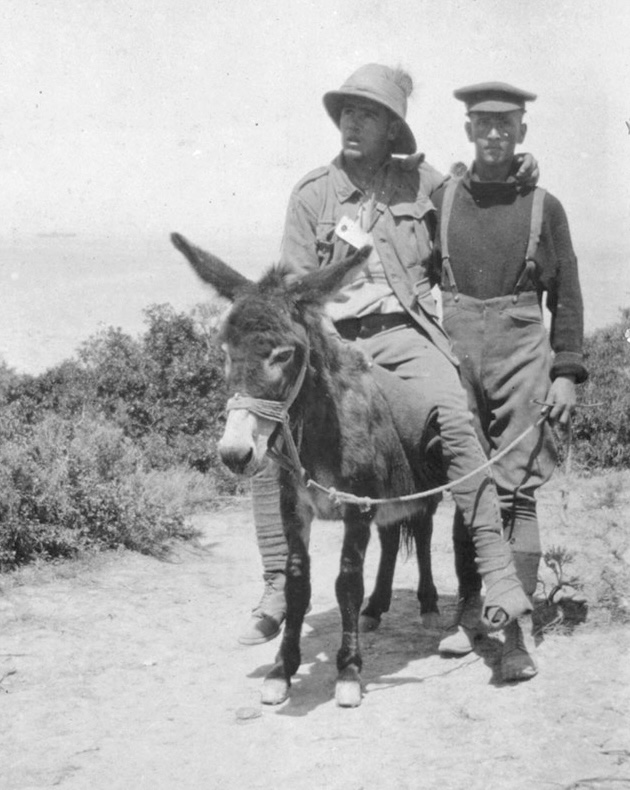
Lt. Richard Alexander "Dick" Henderson, New Zealand Medical Corps, carrying a wounded soldier on a donkey during the Battle of Gallipoli

=== Defence Act 1909 ===
The Defence Act 1909 replaced the Volunteer forces with a Territorial force and compulsory military training, a regime that remained until the late 1960s.

=== Separate services (from 1909) ===
See Royal New Zealand Navy, New Zealand Army, Royal New Zealand Air Force

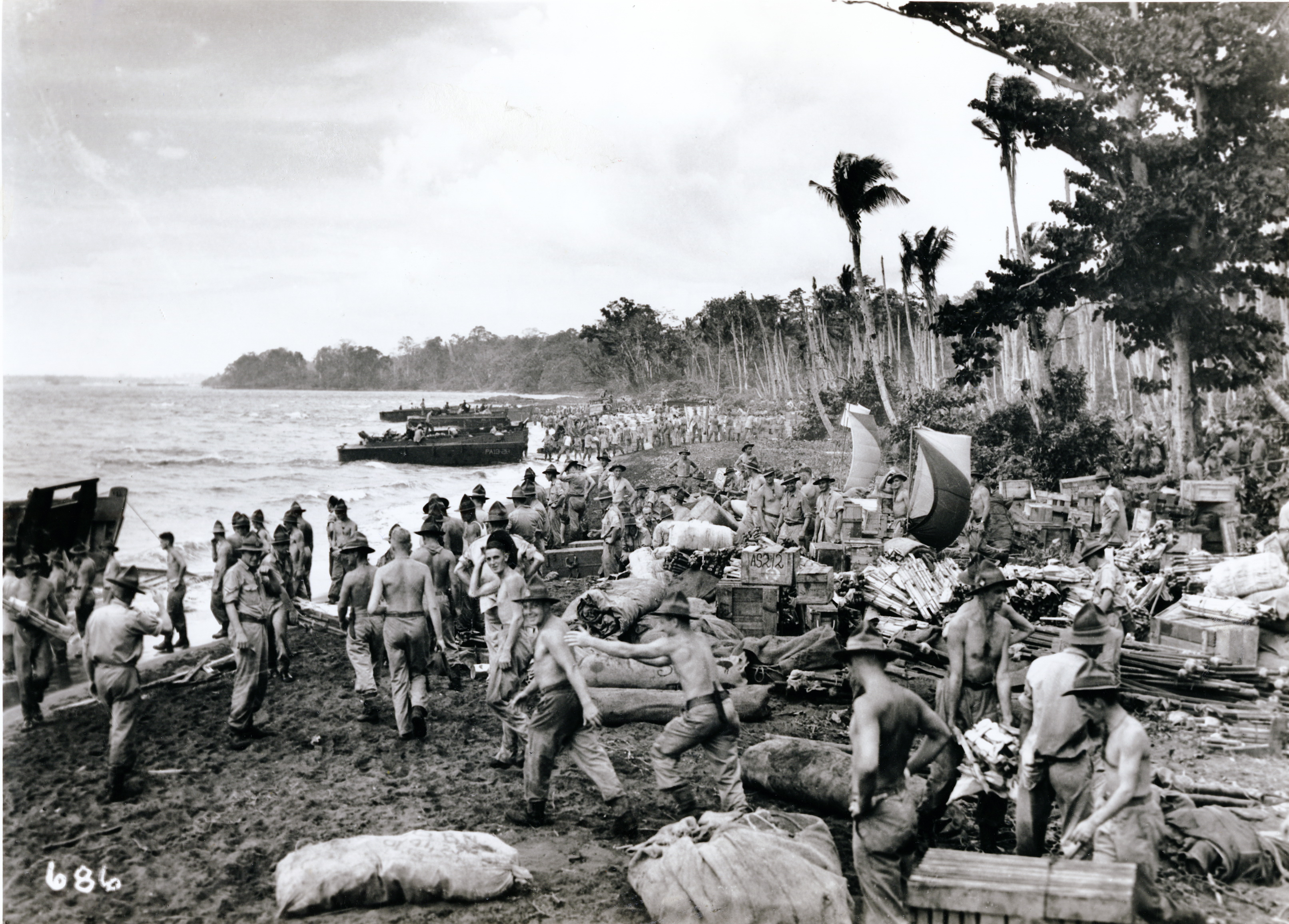
New Zealand troops land on Guadalcanal in the Solomons.

Independent New Zealand armed forces developed in the early twentieth century; the Royal New Zealand Navy was the last to emerge as an independent service in 1941. Prior to that time it had been the New Zealand Division of the Royal Navy. New Zealand forces served alongside the British and other Empire and Commonwealth nations in World War I and World War II.

The fall of Singapore in 1942 showed that Britain could no longer protect its far-flung Dominions. Closer military ties were therefore necessary for New Zealand's defence. With United States entering the war, they were an obvious choice. Links with Australia had also been developed earlier; both nations sent troops to the Anglo-Boer War and New Zealand officer candidates had trained at Australia's Royal Military College Duntroon since 1911, a practice that continues to this day. A combined Australian and New Zealand Army Corps (ANZAC) was formed for the Gallipoli campaign during World War I, and its exploits are key events in the military history of both countries.

The NZDF came into existence under the Defence Act 1990. Under previous legislation, the three services were part of the Ministry of Defence. Post-1990, the Ministry of Defence is a separate, policy-making body under a Secretary of Defence, equal in status to the Chief of Defence Force.

=== 2020s retention and capability issues ===
In 2023, North & South and Radio New Zealand reported that the NZDF was experiencing a high attrition rate in the two-year period between 2021 and 2023 due to poor salaries and living conditions at military accommodation. According to North and South contributor Peter McKenzie, 77% of NZDF personnel were paid between 5% and 16% less than people in equivalent civilian jobs. By October 2022, the NZDF's military attrition rate averaged at 15.8% (ranging from 12.1% for the Navy and 17.4% for the Army). In April 2023, Radio New Zealand reported that the high attrition rate had limited the NZDF's response to Cyclone Gabrielle, its ability to crew three naval offshore patrol vessels, and accelerated the Air Force's decommissioning of its fleet of P-3K2 Orions. The Chief of Defence Force Air Marshal Kevin Short also confirmed that a critical shortage of skilled trades including plumbers, electricians, carpenters, Special Forces, Navy propulsion experts and middle managers had led the Force to make two rounds of NZ$10,000 payments in an attempt to convince personnel to remain in the Defence Force.

In July 2024, the NZDF confirmed that it would be investing NZ$490 million to expand and upgrade housing at the Waiouru Military Camp in partnership with local iwi (tribe) Ngāti Rangi over the next 25 years. In early April 2025, Radio New Zealand reported that the NZDF had dropped some National Certificate of Educational Achievement (NCEA) Level 1 and Level 2 enlistment requirements in 2024 in a bid to boost recruitment.

In September 2026, The New Zealand Herald reported that the New Zealand Special Air Service was facing staff retention issues, with many personnel being lured into private military and security companies by lucrative contracts. While the Defence Force had offered NZSAS operators NZ$30,000 in cash payments in January 2024 to encourage them to remain with the unit, the NZSAS had disbanded its counter-terrorism commando unit, D Squadron, due to a high staff attrition rate. This had forced the New Zealand Police to assume its counter-terrorism role, with the NZSAS A and B Squadrons being placed on stand-by for counter-terrorism operations beyond the Police's capabilities. By late September 2026, B Squadron had been reduced to a few operators.

=== 2020s equipment upgrades ===
On 7 April 2025, Defence Minister Judith Collins announced that the New Zealand Government would be investing NZ$12 billion (US$5 billion) in the NZDF over the next four years to boost defence spending to over 2 percent of gross domestic product. Key priorities have included investing in enhanced strike capabilities, defence housing, unmanned aerial and aquatic vehicles, replacing maritime helicopters and the Boeing 757 fleet, and upgrading existing military infrastructure at Ohakea and Devonport. On 6 May 2025, Collins confirmed that the Government would allocate NZ$2 billion (US$1.2 billion) from this defence funding allocation to purchasing new maritime helicopters for the Royal New Zealand Navy. On 21 August, Defence Minister Collins and Foreign Minister Peters announced that the Government would purchase two Airbus A321XLR jets for the Air Force and five new MH-60R Seahawks for the Navy as part of its long-term defence investment programme. The Airbus jets will replace the Air Force's two Boeing 757 jets while the Seahawk helicopters will replace the Navy's eight Kaman SH-2G Super Seasprites.

On 20 October 2026, the NZ Government signed a $1.6 billion deal to acquire the five Seahawk helicopters and associated torpedoes and missiles.

== Higher direction of the armed services ==
A new HQNZDF facility was opened by Prime Minister Helen Clark in March 2007. The new facility on Aitken St in the Wellington CBD replaced the premises on Stout St that had been the headquarters of NZDF for nearly 75 years. The Aitken St facility initially was home to around 900 employees of the NZDF, the New Zealand Security Intelligence Service (NZSIS) and the Ministry of Defence; the NZSIS moved across to Pipitea House in early 2013, and the NZDF were forced to vacate the Aitken St building after the 2016 Kaikōura earthquake, which seriously damaged the building. HQNZDF functions having been moved into other buildings and facilities across the region. HQNZDF operates as the administrative and support headquarters for the New Zealand Defence Force, with operational forces under the separate administrative command and control of Headquarters Joint Forces New Zealand.

=== Joint Forces Headquarters ===
The operational forces of the three services are directed from Headquarters Joint Forces New Zealand opposite Trentham Military Camp in Upper Hutt. HQ JFNZ was established at Trentham on 1 July 2001. From this building, a former NZ government computer centre that used to house the Army's Land Command, the Air Component Commander, Maritime Component Commander, and Land Component Commander exercise command over their forces. Commander Joint Forces New Zealand (COMJFNZ), controls all overseas operational deployments and most overseas exercises.

=== Senior officers ===
As of October 2026:

Chief of Defence Force; Rear Admiral Matthew Williams (Acting)
Vice Chief of Defence Force; Major General Matt Weston	Commander Joint Forces; Major General Robert Krushka				Chief of Navy; Rear Admiral; Garin Golding	Chief of Army; Major General; Rose King	Chief of Air Force; Air Vice-Marshal; Darryn Webb
Vice Chief of Defence Force; Major General Matt Weston	Special Operations Component Commander; Colonel Sean Bolton	Maritime Component Commander; Commodore; Shane Arndell	Land Component Commander; Brigadier; Jason Dyhrberg	Air Component Commander; Air Commodore; Andy Scott	Deputy Chief of Navy; Commodore; Karl Woodhead	Deputy Chief of Army; Brigadier; Hamish Gibbons	Deputy Chief of Air Force; Air Commodore; Peter Gibson

The Defence Force created a joint-service corporate services organisation known as the Joint Logistics and Support Organisation (JLSO) in the 2000s, which later became Defence Shared Services.

Following the establishment of Special Operations Command on 1 July 2015, the new position of Special Operations Component Commander was created. This officer reports to the Commander Joint Forces New Zealand, and is of equivalent status to the Maritime, Land and Air Component Commanders.

For the first time, two of the Deputy Chiefs of service, Navy and Air Force, one-star Commodores and Air Commodores, were women. Captain Melissa Ross was promoted to Commodore and appointed as Deputy Chief of Navy in December 2019, while in August 2019 Group Captain Carol Abraham was promoted to Air Commodore and appointed as Deputy Chief of Air Force. Another female officer, Colonel Helen Cooper, had previously held the post of Deputy Chief of Army though in an acting capacity without being promoted to the customary rank of Brigadier. In an unusual move, as of February 2020, the Deputy Chief of Army, Evan Williams, holds not just the customary rank of Brigadier but that of Major General, usually only held by the Chief of Army.

=== Support for servicemen and women ===
The New Zealand Defence Force has implemented revised policy to increase support for the active servicemen and women in a number of ways and has expanded its support for all veterans. This includes starting the Defence Force KiwiSaver scheme, and appointing financial advisers to support the welfare of members.

=== Limited Service Volunteer programme ===
Since 1993, the New Zealand Defence Force has run a six-week residential training course called the Limited Service Volunteer (LSV) programme in partnership with the Ministry of Social Development (MSD) and New Zealand Police. The programme focuses on life skills, health and fitness, workforce skills development and financial management. In 2015, an MSD evaluation report found that the LSV course improved participants' workforce participation, income, higher educational participation, and reduced incarceration rates.

In June 2019, the Government established a new NZ$11 million facility at Whenuapai Airbase in Auckland to support plans to raise the cohort of LSV trainees to 1,600 in 2020. Wing Commander Tua Atkinson estimated that 80% of LSV participants completed the course.

In late June 2024, an NZDF briefing paper reported an increase in behavioural issues among LSV participants, physical assaults on staff and decreased morale, well-being and retention among NZDF staff involved in the LSV course. The briefing paper estimated that 60% of youths participating in the LSV course in 2022–2023 had complex needs. It also reported that NZDF staff were overwhelmed by participants' behavioural problems, with at least ten personnel experiencing serious mental harm including suicide ideation.

== Branches ==
=== Navy ===
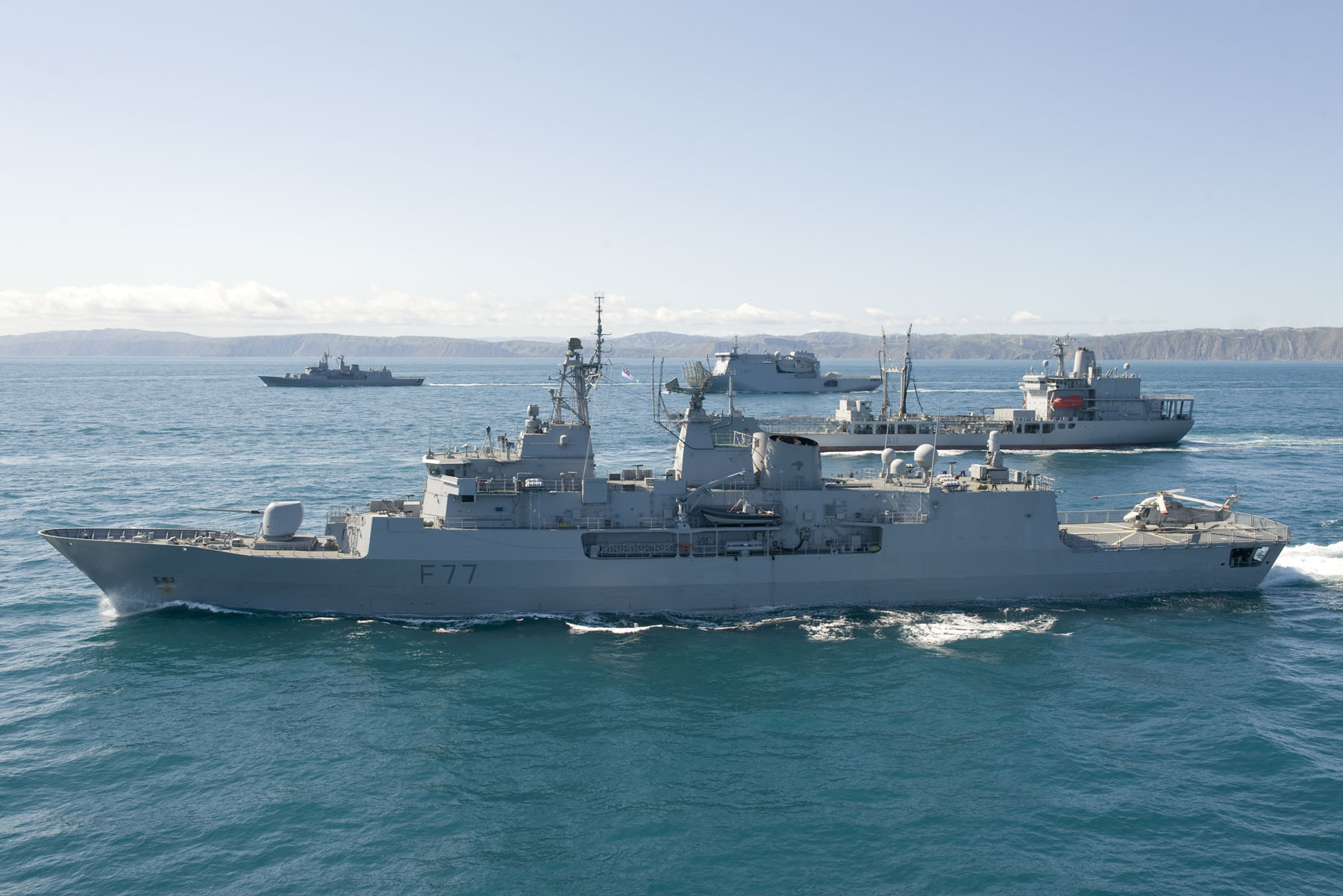
HMNZS Te Kaha in Cook Strait along with other RNZN ships

The Royal New Zealand Navy (RNZN) has 2,219 regular force and 611 reserve force sailors. The RNZN possess two Anzac class frigates, developed in conjunction with Australia, based on the German MEKO 200 design. Six other commissioned ships are in use, consisting of patrol vessels and logistics vessels. In 2010, the RNZN completed the acquisition of seven new vessels: one large multi-role vessel, two offshore patrol vessels, and four inshore patrol vessels (two inshore patrol vessels were sold to Irish Naval Service in 2023). All of these vessels were acquired under Project Protector, and were built to commercial, not naval, standards. A new replenishment oiler was commissioned into service in 2020.

- HMNZS Te Kaha
- HMNZS Te Mana
- HMNZS Otago
- HMNZS Wellington
- HMNZS Hawea
- HMNZS Taupo
- HMNZS Canterbury
- HMNZS Aotearoa

=== Army ===
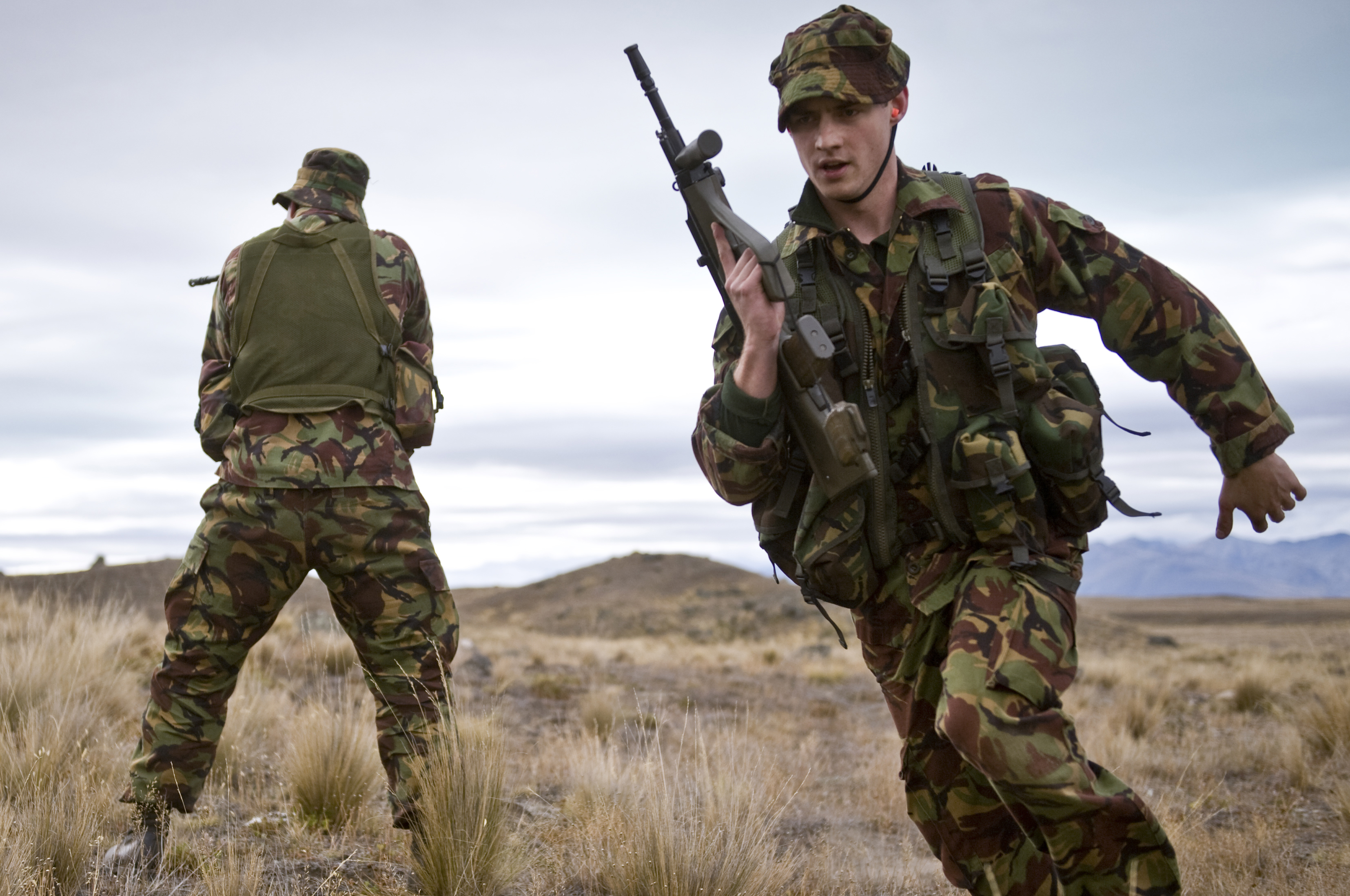
Two soldiers from the Queen Alexandra's Mounted Rifles during an exercise in 2010

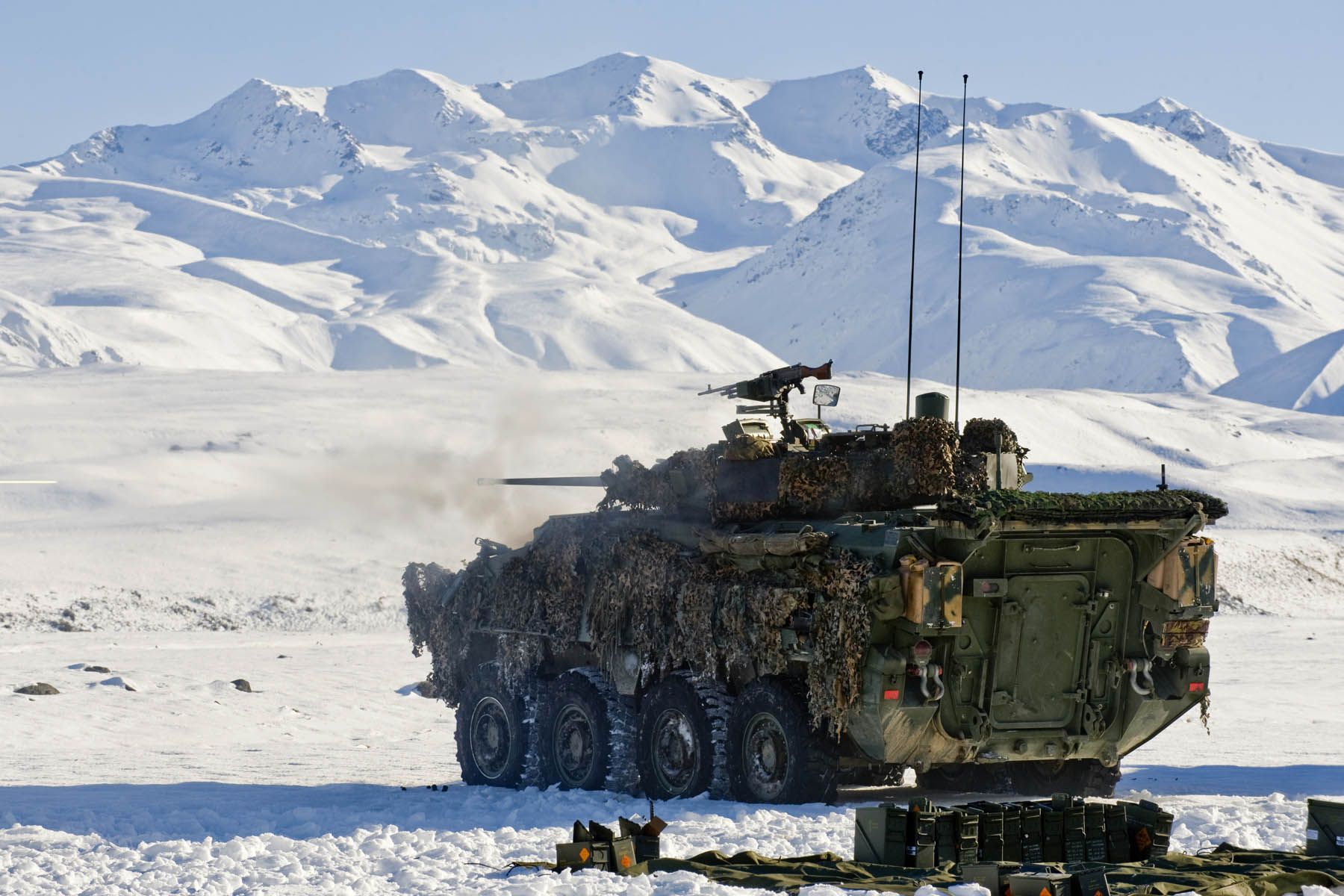
A New Zealand Army NZLAV at Tekapo Military Camp

The New Zealand Army has 4,519 regular force and 2,065 reserve force soldiers. The army is a light combat force made up of infantry and motorised infantry equipped with 73 Canadian-manufactured LAV III light armoured vehicles. There are also armoured reconnaissance, artillery, logistic, communications, medical and intelligence elements. The New Zealand Special Air Service is the NZDF's special forces capability, which operates in both conventional warfare and counter-terrorist roles. The Corps and Regiments of the New Zealand Army include:

- Royal Regiment of New Zealand Artillery
- Royal New Zealand Armoured Corps
- Corps of Royal New Zealand Engineers
- Royal New Zealand Corps of Signals
- Royal New Zealand Infantry Regiment
- Royal New Zealand Army Logistic Regiment
- Royal New Zealand Army Medical Corps
- Royal New Zealand Army Nursing Corps
- Royal New Zealand Army Dental Corps
- Corps of Royal New Zealand Military Police
- New Zealand Intelligence Corps
- New Zealand Army Legal Services
- New Zealand Army Physical Training Corps
- Royal New Zealand Army Chaplains Department

=== Air Force ===
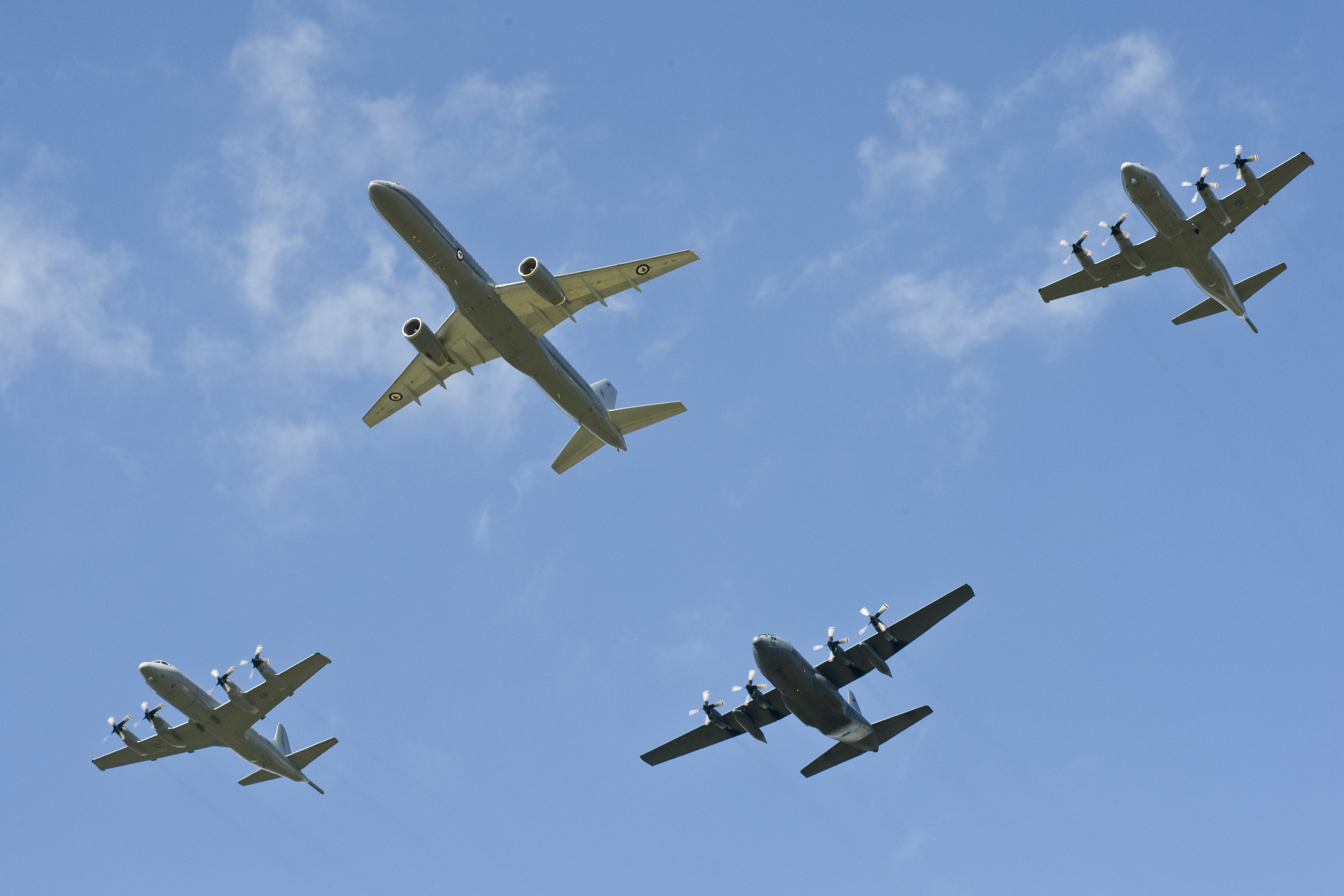
An RNZAF Boeing 757, two Lockheed P3K Orions and a Lockheed C130H Hercules in formation

The Royal New Zealand Air Force (RNZAF) had, as of 2021, 2,477 regular force and 354 reserve force aircrew. As of 2026, the RNZAF consists of 44 aircraft, consisting of P-8 Poseidon maritime patrol aircraft and Lockheed Martin C-130J Super Hercules and Boeing 757 transport aircraft. The NHIndustries NH90 operates in a medium-utility role, and the AgustaWestland AW109 operates the light utility helicopter role, in addition to being the main training platform. The Kaman SH-2G Super Seasprite helicopter is flown in support of the Royal New Zealand Navy. RNZAF primary flight training occurs in Beechcraft T-6 Texan IIs, before moving onto the Beechcraft King Air (for multi-engine fixed wing training) or AW109 (helicopter training).

The RNZAF does not have air combat capabilities following the retirement of its Air Combat Force of A-4 Skyhawks in December 2001.

- No. 3 Squadron RNZAF
- No. 5 Squadron RNZAF
- No. 6 Squadron RNZAF
- No. 14 Squadron RNZAF
- No. 40 Squadron RNZAF
- No. 42 Squadron RNZAF
- No. 62 Squadron RNZAF
- No. 72 Space Squadron RNZAF
- No. 230 Squadron RNZAF
- Central Flying School

== Overseas deployments ==
Country	Command	Description
Bahrain	Combined Task Force 150	
Egypt	Multinational Force and Observers	
Iraq	Combined Joint Task Force – Operation Inherent Resolve United States Air Force 609th Air Operations Center	
Kuwait	Combined Joint Task Force – Operation Inherent Resolve United States Air Force 609th Air Operations Center	
Qatar	Combined Joint Task Force – Operation Inherent Resolve United States Air Force 609th Air Operations Center	
Jordan	Operation Gallant Phoenix	
United Kingdom	Operation Tīeke	Training and logistical support for the Armed Forces of Ukraine in response to the Russo-Ukrainian War.
Belgium	Operation Tīeke	Training and logistical support for the Armed Forces of Ukraine in response to the Russo-Ukrainian War.
Germany	Operation Tīeke	Training and logistical support for the Armed Forces of Ukraine in response to the Russo-Ukrainian War.
Poland	Operation Tīeke	Training and logistical support for the Armed Forces of Ukraine in response to the Russo-Ukrainian War.
South Korea	United Nations Command & Military Armistice Commission	
South Sudan	United Nations Mission in South Sudan	
Japan	United Nations Security Council sanctions on North Korea	Deployment of aircraft and ships for monitoring and ensuring compliance in sanctions against North Korea.
Israel	United Nations Truce Supervision Organisation	
Lebanon	United Nations Truce Supervision Organisation	
Syria	United Nations Truce Supervision Organisation	

== Foreign defence relations ==
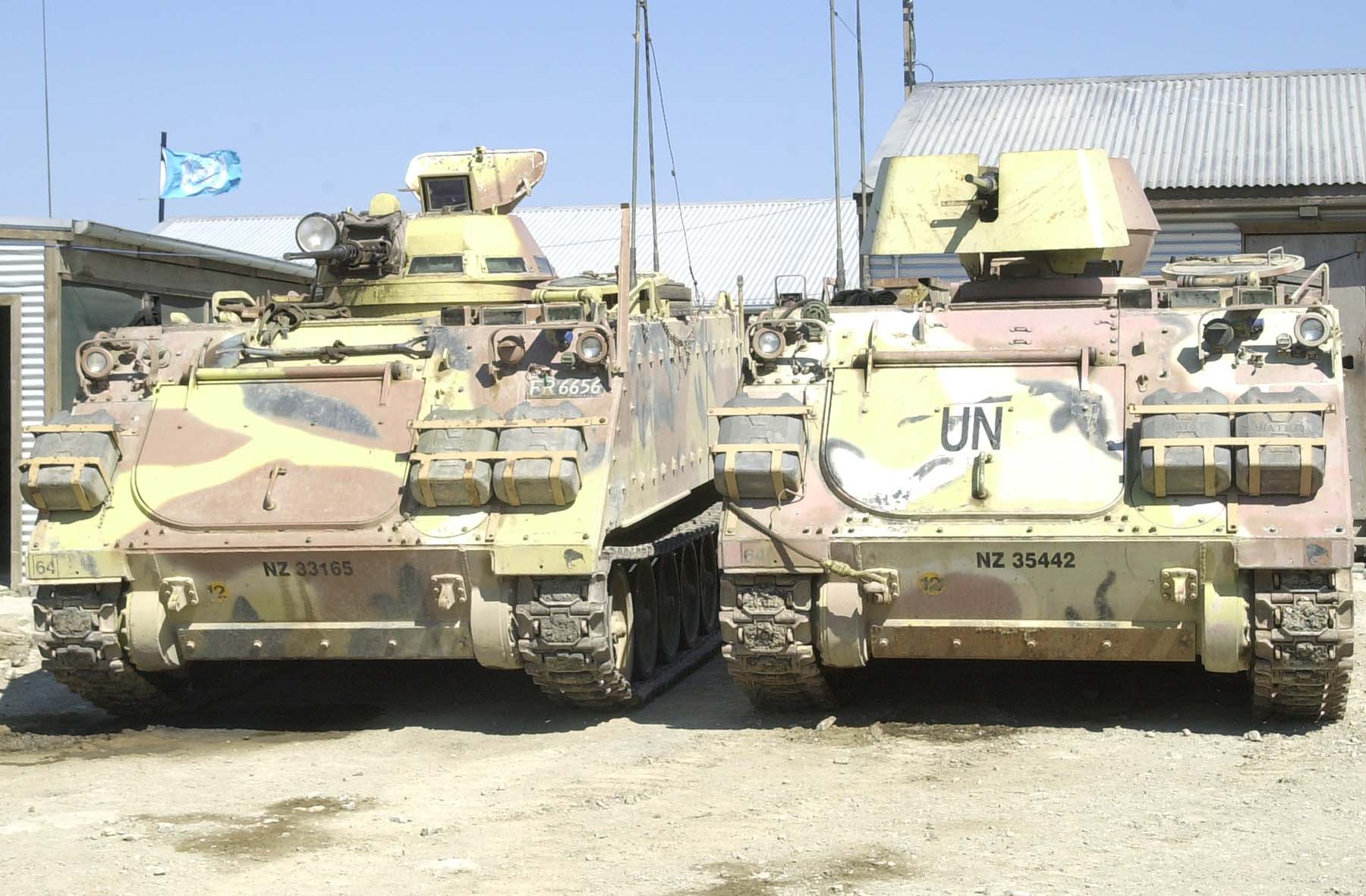
New Zealand M113A1 armoured personnel carriers of UNTAET at the Gate Pā base in the southern Suai area, East Timor, 2002

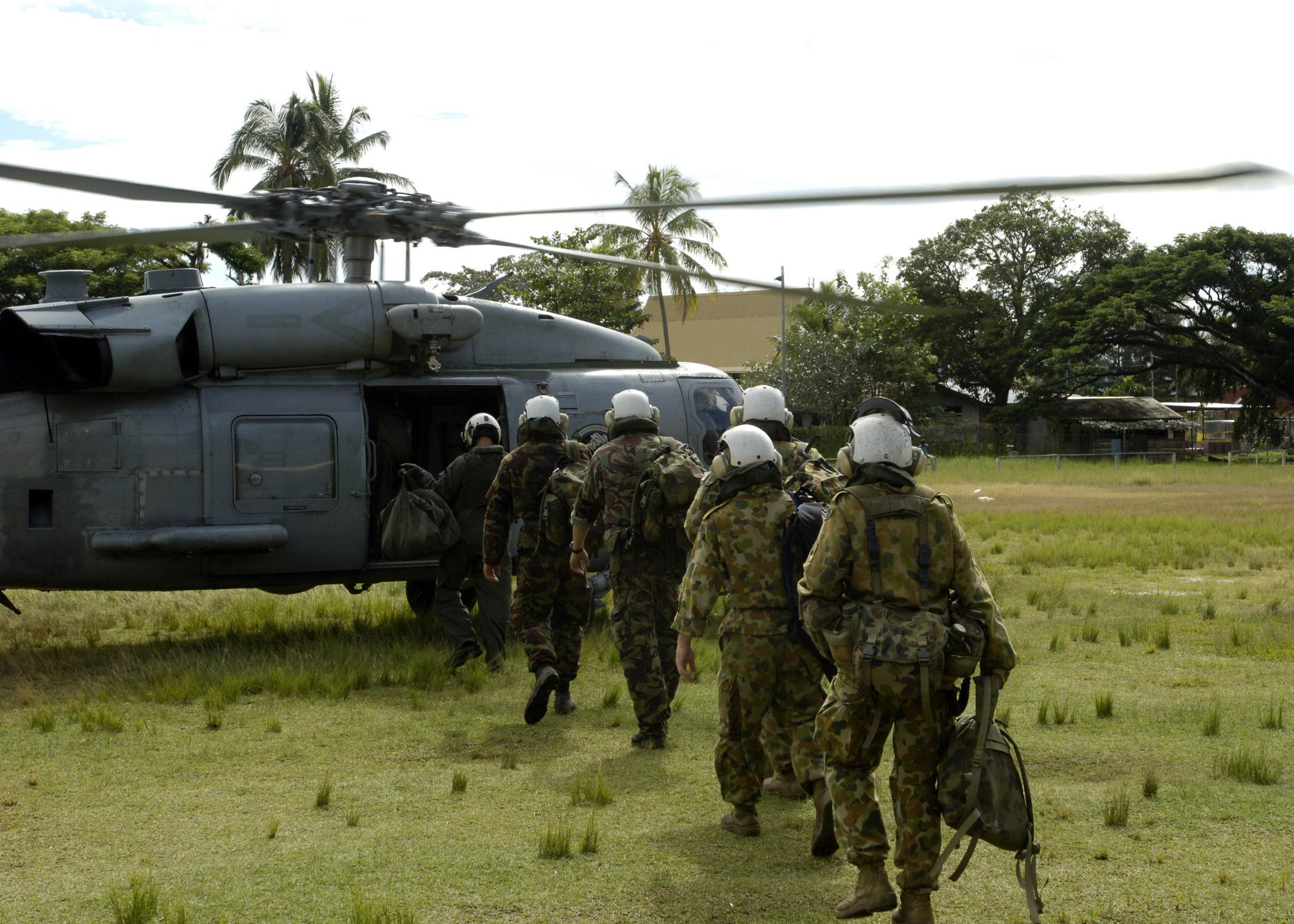
New Zealand and Australian military personnel boarding a United States Navy helicopter to administer medical aid in outlying areas of the Solomon Islands during a humanitarian aid mission after the 2007 Solomon Islands earthquake

New Zealand states it maintains a "credible minimum force", although critics (including the New Zealand National Party while in opposition) maintain that the country's defence forces have fallen below this standard. With a claimed area of direct strategic concern that extends from Australia to Southeast Asia to the South Pacific, and with defence expenditures that total around 1.5% of GDP, New Zealand necessarily places substantial reliance on co-operating with other countries, particularly Australia.

New Zealand is an active participant in multilateral peacekeeping. It has taken a leading role in peace-keeping in the Solomon Islands and the neighbouring island of Bougainville. New Zealand has contributed to United Nations and other peacekeeping operations in Angola, Cambodia, Somalia, Lebanon and the former Yugoslavia. It also participated in the Multilateral Interception Force in the Persian Gulf. New Zealand has an ongoing peacekeeping commitment to East Timor, where it participated in the INTERFET, UNTAET and UMAMET missions from 1999 to 2002. At one point over 1,000 NZDF personnel were in East Timor. The deployment included the vessels HMNZS Canterbury, Te Kaha and Endeavour, six Iroquois helicopters, two C-130 Hercules and an infantry battalion. In response to renewed conflict in 2006 more troops were deployed as part of an international force. New Zealand has participated in 2 NATO-led coalitions; SFOR in the Former Yugoslavia (until December 2004) and an ongoing one in Afghanistan (which took over from a US-led coalition in 2006). New Zealand also participated in the European Union EUFOR operation in the former Yugoslavia from December 2004 until New Zealand ended its 15-year continuous contribution there on 30 June 2007.

As of December 2015, New Zealand had 167 personnel deployed across the globe. These deployments are to Afghanistan(8), Antarctica(8), South Korea(5), Iraq(106), Middle East(8), Sinai(26), South Sudan(3) and the United Arab Emirates(11). 209 NZDF personnel were on other deployments and exercises.

New Zealand shares training facilities, personnel exchanges, and joint exercises with the Philippines, Thailand, Indonesia, Papua New Guinea, Brunei, Tonga, and South Pacific states. It exercises with its Five Power Defence Arrangements partners, Australia, the United Kingdom, Malaysia, and Singapore. New Zealand military personnel participate in training exercises, conferences and visits as part of military diplomacy.

New Zealand is a signatory of the ANZUS treaty, a defence pact between New Zealand, Australia and the United States dating from 1951. After the 1986 anti-nuclear legislation that refused access of nuclear-powered or armed vessels to ports, the USA withdrew its obligations to New Zealand under ANZUS. ANZUS exercises are now bilateral between Australia and the United States. Under anti-nuclear legislation, any ship must declare whether it is nuclear-propelled or carrying nuclear weapons before entering New Zealand waters. Due to the US policy at that time of "neither confirm nor deny", ship visits ceased although NZ and the USA remained "good friends". Following the Wellington Declaration in 2010, US and NZ government announced a resumption of military cooperation in 2013. Port visits resumed in 2016, when the U.S. Navy was invited to send a ship to participate in the RNZN's 75th Birthday Celebration, and destroyer USS Sampson (DDG-102) visited Auckland.

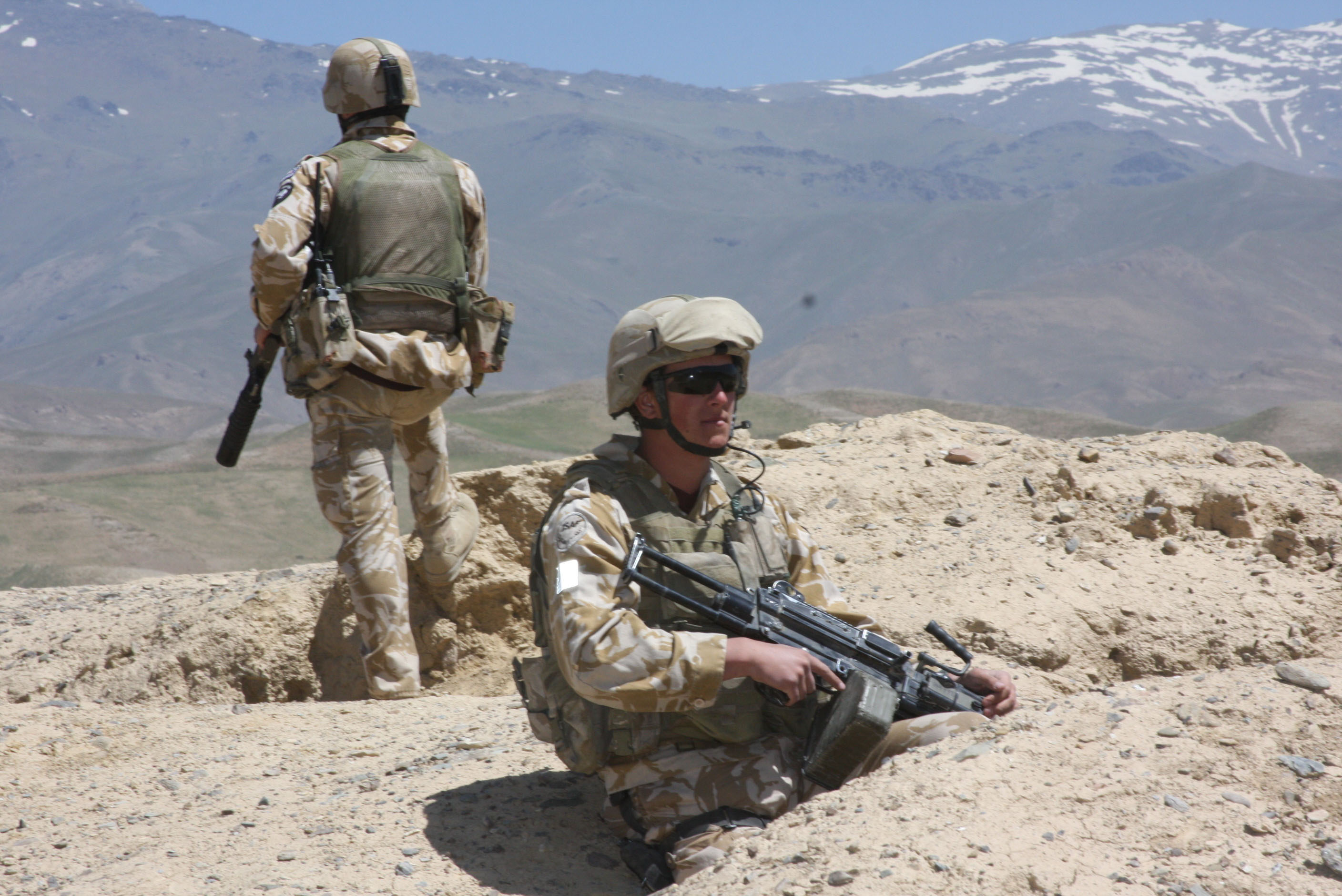
Two members of the New Zealand Provincial Reconstruction Team in Afghanistan during 2009

The NZDF served alongside NATO-led forces in Afghanistan in the first decade of the twenty-first century, and in 2004 the NZSAS was awarded a Presidential Unit Citation by US President George W Bush for "extraordinary heroism" in action. In 2008 US Secretary of State Condoleezza Rice during a visit to New Zealand said "New Zealand is now a friend and an ally".

New Zealand is a member of the ABCA Armies standardisation programme, the naval AUSCANNZUKUS forum, the Air and Space Interoperability Council (ASIC, the former ASCC, which, among other tasks, allocates NATO reporting names) and other Western 'Five Eyes' fora for sharing signals intelligence information and achieving interoperability with like-minded armed forces, such as The Technical Cooperation Program (TTCP).

== See also ==
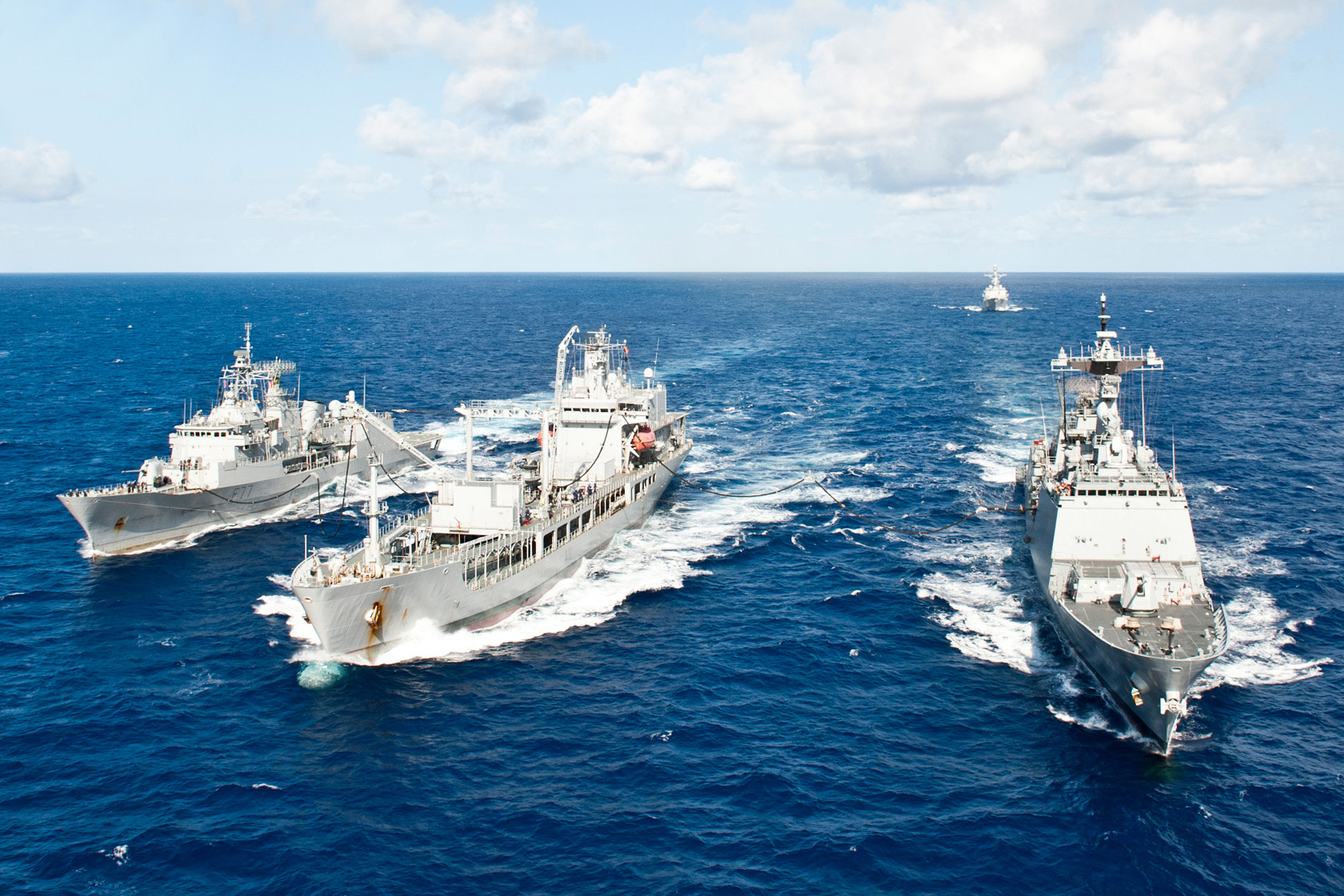
HMNZS Te Kaha and HMNZS Endeavour and the South Korean destroyer ROKS Choe Yeong at RIMPAC 2012

- List of New Zealand military bases
- List of individual weapons of the New Zealand armed forces
- New Zealand Defence College
- Current Royal New Zealand Navy ships
- List of ships of the Royal New Zealand Navy
- Future of the Royal New Zealand Navy
- List of aircraft of the RNZAF and RNZN
- List of squadrons of the RNZAF
- New Zealand Cadet Forces
- List of former Royal New Zealand Air Force stations
- 2025 New Zealand espionage case
