= Chief of Defence Force (New Zealand) =

Professional head of the New Zealand Defence Force

- Coat of arms of New Zealand

- Incumbent; Mat Williams; Acting since 25 October 2026
- Abbreviation: CDF
- Member of: New Zealand Defence Force
- Reports to: Minister of Defence
- Term length: Three years (renewable)
- Constituting instrument: Defence Act 1990
- Formation: 1 July 1963
- First holder: Vice Admiral; Sir Peter Phipps
- Deputy: Vice Chief of Defence Force
- Website: Official website

The Chief of Defence Force (CDF) is the appointment held by the professional head of the New Zealand Defence Force. The post has existed under its present name since 1991. From 1963 to 1991 the head of the New Zealand Defence Force was known as the Chief of Defence Staff. All the incumbents have held three-star rank. The current acting Chief of Defence Force is Acting Vice Admiral Mat Williams, who will hold the position until a formal replacement is announced at a later date.

== Role ==
The CDF is the professional head of the defence forces and serves as the principal military advisor to the government. They are responsible for directing the chiefs of service and ensuring morale. The CDF also serves as the chief executive of the defence force, thereby being the person with sole accountability to the government and people of New Zealand.

== Appointments ==
The following list chronologically records those who have held the post of Chief of Defence Force or its preceding positions, with rank and honours as at the completion of the individual's term.

No.	Portrait	Name	Took office	Left office	Time in office	Defence branch	Ref.
Chief of Defence Staff
1	Sir Peter Phipps KBE, DSC & Bar, VRD	Vice Admiral; Sir Peter Phipps KBE, DSC & Bar, VRD (1909–1989)	1 July 1963	July 1965	2 years	RNZN	
2	Sir Leonard Thornton KCB, CBE	Lieutenant General; Sir Leonard Thornton KCB, CBE (1916–1999)	July 1965	October 1971	6 years	Army	
3	Sir Richard Webb KBE, CB	Lieutenant General; Sir Richard Webb KBE, CB (1919–1990)	1971	1976	4–5 years	Army	
4	Sir Richard Bolt KBE, CB, DFC, AFC	Air Marshal; Sir Richard Bolt KBE, CB, DFC, AFC (1923–2014)	1976	1980	3–4 years	RNZAF	
5	Sir Neil Anderson KBE, CB	Vice Admiral; Sir Neil Anderson KBE, CB (1927–2010)	1980	1983	2–3 years	RNZN	
6	Sir Ewan Jamieson KBE, CB	Air Marshal; Sir Ewan Jamieson KBE, CB (1930–2013)	1983	1986	2–3 years	RNZAF	
7	David Crooks CB, OBE	Air Marshal; David Crooks CB, OBE (1931–2022)	1986	1987	2–3 years	RNZAF	
8	Sir John Mace KBE, CB	Lieutenant General; Sir John Mace KBE, CB (1932–2026)	1987	1991	3–4 years	Army	
Chief of Defence Force
9	Sir Somerford Teagle KBE	Vice Admiral; Sir Somerford Teagle KBE	1991	1995	3–4 years	RNZN	
10	Anthony Birks CB, OBE	Lieutenant General; Anthony Birks CB, OBE (1941–2002)	1995	1999	3–4 years	Army	
11	Carey Adamson CNZM, AFC	Air Marshal; Carey Adamson CNZM, AFC (1942–2019)	1999	2001	3–4 years	RNZAF	
12	Bruce Ferguson OBE, AFC	Air Marshal; Bruce Ferguson OBE, AFC (born 1949)	2001	30 April 2006	4–5 years	RNZAF	
13	Jerry Mateparae ONZM	Lieutenant General; Jerry Mateparae ONZM (born 1954)	1 May 2006	23 January 2011	4 years, 267 days	Army	
14	Rhys Jones CNZM	Lieutenant General; Rhys Jones CNZM (born 1960)	24 January 2011	31 January 2014	3 years, 7 days	Army	
15	Tim Keating MNZM	Lieutenant General; Tim Keating MNZM	1 February 2014	30 June 2018	4 years, 149 days	Army	
16	Kevin Short CNZM	Air Marshal; Kevin Short CNZM	1 July 2018	6 June 2024	5 years, 341 days	RNZAF	
17	Tony Davies MNZM	Air Marshal; Tony Davies MNZM	6 June 2024	23 October 2026	2 years, 139 days	RNZAF	
–	Mat Williams	Acting Vice Admiral; Mat Williams; Acting	25 October 2026	Incumbent	12 days	RNZN	.
