= 1978 New Year Honours (New Zealand) =

Annual awards for New Zealanders

The 1978 New Year Honours in New Zealand were appointments by Elizabeth II on the advice of the New Zealand government to various orders and honours to reward and highlight good works by New Zealanders. The awards celebrated the passing of 1977 and the beginning of 1978, and were announced on 31 December 1977.

The recipients of honours are displayed here as they were styled before their new honour.

== Knight Bachelor ==
- Alan Thomas Gandell CBE – of Wellington. For services to the Order of St John.
- Thomas Wilfred Perry CMG – of Christchurch. For services to commerce and the community.

== Order of the Bath ==
=== Companion (CB) ===
Military division

- Major General Ronald Douglas Patrick Hassett CBE – Chief of General Staff.

== Order of Saint Michael and Saint George ==
=== Companion (CMG) ===
- The Most Reverend Allen Howard Johnston – Anglican Primate and Archbishop of New Zealand since 1972 and Bishop of Waikato since 1969.
- The Very Reverend John Spenser Somerville MC – of Dunedin. For services to the Presbyterian Church and the University of Otago.
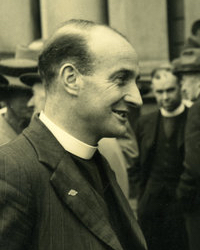
Jack Somerville

== Order of the British Empire ==
=== Knight Commander (KBE) ===
Civil division

- Harry Heaton Barker CBE JP. For services to the City of Gisborne.
- James Clendon Tau Henare CBE DSO – of Moerewa. For services to the community, especially Māori affairs.
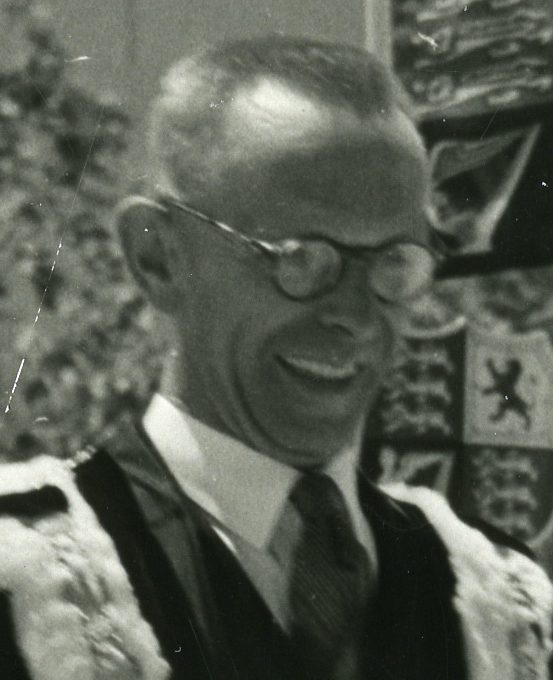
Sir Harry Barker

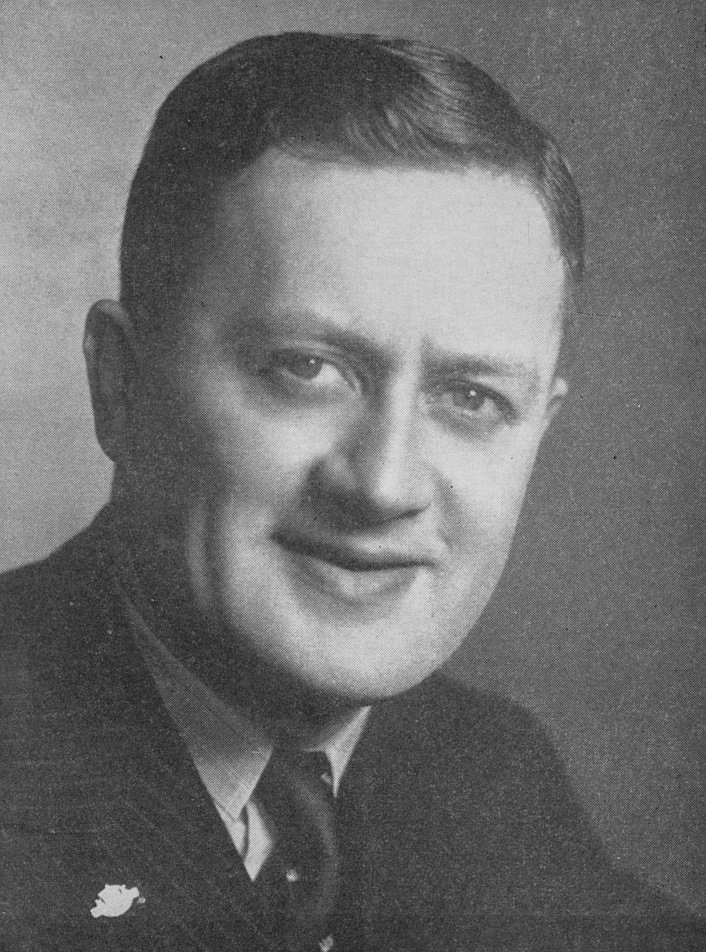
Sir James Henare

=== Commander (CBE) ===
Civil division

- Sydney James Robert Chatten – of Lower Hutt. For services to business management.
- Leverick Joseph Kenneth Putter – Secretary of Trade and Industry 1975–1977.
- Esmond Allen Gibson OBE – of Wellington. For services to civil aviation.
- Stanislaus Francis Hoskins JP – of Wellington. For charitable and educational work.
- Emeritus Professor William Parker Morrell – of Dunedin. For services to literature and historical research.
- John Lorraine Sullivan – of Wellington. For services to rugby.
- Miraka Szászy – of Auckland. For services to the community and Māori people.

Military division

- Brigadier Brian Matauru Poananga OBE – Deputy Chief of General Staff.
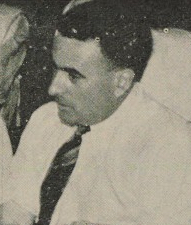
Esmond Gibson

=== Officer (OBE) ===
Civil division

- (Isoleen) Heather Begg (Mrs King) – of Sydney, Australia. For services to opera.
- William Bryan JP – of Auckland. For services to the Royal New Zealand Foundation for the Blind.
- The Reverend Canon Samuel Corney – of Motueka. For services to the community.
- Albert Roy Frethey – of Esher, Surrey, England. For services to New Zealand interests in the United Kingdom.
- Alicia Doreen Grant JP – of Christchurch. For services to the community.
- Sheila Marie Horton – of Auckland. For services to the community.
- Anthony Frederick Hunter – of Auckland. For services to medicine and the community.
- Charles Frederick Jones – of Northland. For services to the community and farming industry.
- Joan Stewart MacCormick MBE – of Auckland. For services to the community.
- Dr Kingsley Edward Mortimer – of Auckland. For services to psychogeriatrics.
- Nancy Northcroft – of Christchurch. For services to town planning.
- Leslie George Piper JP – of Auckland. For services to the brewing industry and the community.
- Bartholomew Sheehan – of Rotorua. For services to Māori affairs.
- James Maxwell Somerville – of Te Kūiti. For services to local government.
- Edward Bickmore Ellison Taylor – of Christchurch. For public services.
- John Samuel Thorn – of Dunedin. For services to local government and the community.
- Herbert Lea Towers MBE – of Auckland. For services to sport and education.

Military division

- Commander Christopher Richard Vennell – Royal New Zealand Navy.
- Lieutenant Colonel Evan John Torrance – Royal New Zealand Infantry Regiment.
- Group Captain Stuart McIntyre DFC – Royal New Zealand Air Force.

=== Member (MBE) ===
Civil division

- Ronald Morrison Barclay – of New Plymouth. For services to the community.
- Leonard Charles Barnes – of Nelson. For services to music and the arts.
- Richard Fenton De Latour – of Dunedin. For services to the Otago Harbour Board.
- Kenelm Hubert Digby – of Wellington, lately office solicitor, Department of Health.
- Ian James Drabble JP – of Christchurch. For services to the community.
- John Boys Drawbridge – of Wellington. For services to art.
- Laura Freda Elkins – of Wellington. For public services.
- Douglas Lauriston Fyfe – of Christchurch. For services to agricultural journalism.
- Peter Maxwell Gentry – detective chief inspector, New Zealand Police.
- Peter David Hensman Godfrey – of Bluntisham, Cambridgeshire, England. For services to music.
- Henry Coleridge Hitchcock – of Wellington; lately senior research engineer, head office, New Zealand Electricity Department.
- James Edward Knowling – of Auckland. For services to rugby league.
- William Trevor Martin – of Wellington. For services to cricket.
- Colin Quincey – of Auckland. For displaying a remarkable feat of endurance by becoming the first person to row the Tasman Sea single-handed from New Zealand to Australia.
- The Reverend Canon Rimu Hamiora Rangiihu – of Waipatu. For services to the Māori people.
- Arthur Wellesley Vivian Reeve – of Wellington. For services to scouting.
- William Sanders Sr. – of Te Awamutu. For services to the community and horse racing.
- Charles Kesteven Saxton – of Dunedin. For services to rugby.
- Henry Wood Year-Smith – of Auckland. For services to agriculture.
- Leonard Basil Swan – of Dunedin. For services to trade-union affairs.
- Henry Charles Allan Wards – of Lower Hutt. For services to the Young Farmers Clubs Federation.
- Squadron Leader Walter Sinclair Anthony Waterston – of Southland; commander, Southland No. 12 (Invercargill), Air Training Corps Squadron, New Zealand Cadet Forces.
- Dr John Stuart Yeates – of Palmerston North. For services to horticulture.

Military division

- Lieutenant Commander Kenneth Neil Cameron – Royal New Zealand Navy.
- Lieutenant Commander John Wilfred Jennings – Royal New Zealand Navy.
- Major Anthony Leonard Birks – Royal New Zealand Infantry Regiment.
- Major Harry Roberts Burt – Royal New Zealand Infantry Regiment.
- Major and Quartermaster Girvan Ross Hornbrook BEM – Royal New Zealand Infantry Regiment.
- Warrant Officer Class I Graham Nash – Royal New Zealand Infantry Regiment.
- Squadron Leader George Stephen Higgins – Royal New Zealand Air Force.
- Squadron Leader Thomas Michael Strang – Royal New Zealand Air Force.
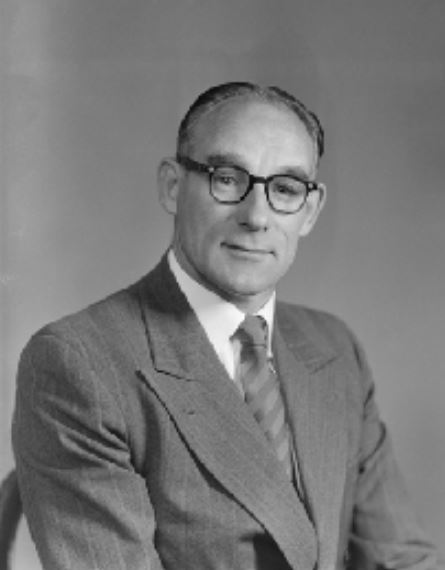
Ron Barclay

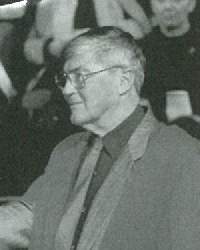
John Drawbridge

== British Empire Medal (BEM) ==
Military division

- Chief Radioman John Hamilton Bullock – Royal New Zealand Navy.
- Control Electrical Mechanician First Class John Ingram Johnson – Royal New Zealand Navy.
- Chief Engineering Mechanic Laurence Francis McGuire – Royal New Zealand Navy.
- Warrant Officer Class II Janice Marion Barlow – Royal New Zealand Corps of Signals.
- Warrant Officer Class II Robert Anthony Cowan – Royal New Zealand Infantry Regiment.
- Staff Sergeant Ivan Graham Goile – Royal New Zealand Engineers (Territorial Force).
- Corporal Nannette Grant – Royal New Zealand Armoured Corps.
- Staff Sergeant Peter Charles Sheppard – Royal New Zealand Army Service Corps.
- Flight Sergeant Murray Gordon Blakemore – Royal New Zealand Air Force.
- Warrant Officer Richard Norman Marshall – Royal New Zealand Air Force.
- Flight Sergeant Raymond Murphy – Royal New Zealand Air Force.

== Companion of the Queen's Service Order (QSO) ==
=== For community service ===
- Florence Baber – of Palmerston North.
- Edward Browse Gilberd – of Stokes Valley.
- The Reverend Malcolm Leadbetter – of Christchurch.

=== For public services ===
- Ivan Wilfred Apperley – of Wellington; Secretary of Māori Affairs and Māori Trustee 1975–77.
- Peter Norris George Blaxall – of Christchurch.
- Lieutenant Colonel the Right Honourable Sir Martin Michael Charles Charteris GCB GCVO OBE – Private Secretary to The Queen 1972–77.
- Dorothy Rita Fraser JP – of Dunedin.
- John Graham Hamilton – of Lower Hutt; lately parliamentary law draftsman.
- Charles Pierrepont Hutchinson MBE QC – of Auckland.
- Henry Charles Kennedy JP – of Thames.
- George Austin O'Leary MC JP – of Wellington.
- Peter Roselli JP – of Westport.
- Geoffrey Fantham Sim – of Matamata.
- Ian Douglas Stevenson – of Wellington; chairman of the Metric Advisory Board.
- George Ernest Tiller JP – of Whangārei.
- Evan Graham Turbott – Director of the Auckland Institute and Museum.
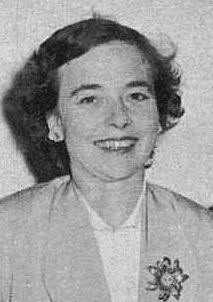
Dorothy Fraser

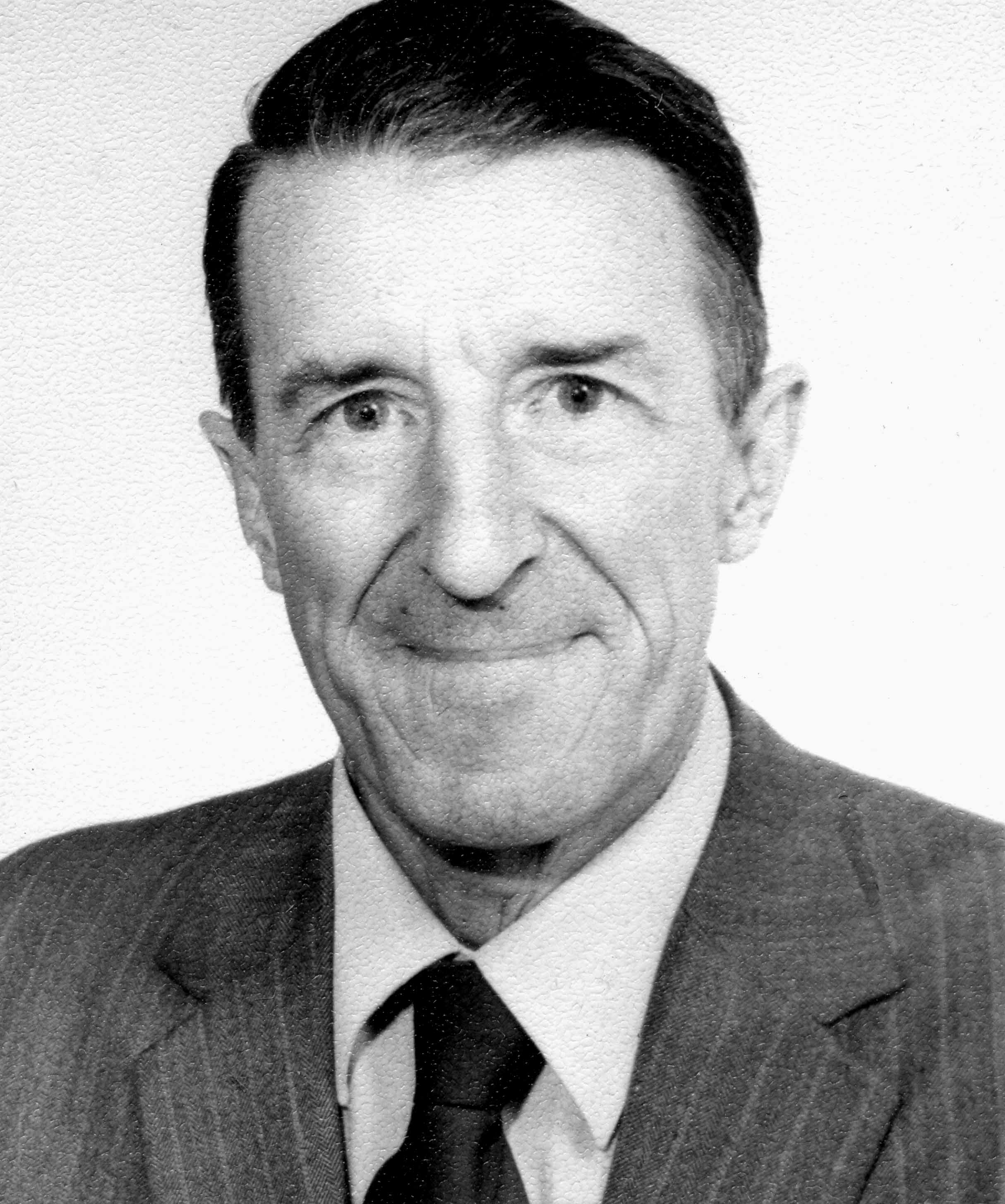
Graham Turbott

== Queen's Service Medal (QSM) ==
=== For community service ===
- Christine Cairns Balloch – of Kaitangata.
- Violet Blease – of Auckland.
- Eleanor Mary Burgess – of Wanganui.
- Alice Maud Campbell – of Auckland.
- Jocelyn Ann Carlton – of South Canterbury.
- Frederick Charles John Chittock – of Auckland.
- Rosea Merle Crawford – of Hāwera.
- Cyril Martin Croucher JP – of Taupō.
- Colin Henry Gilmour Curragh – of Christchurch.
- Elsie May De Mey – of Levin.
- Owen Cecil Finer – of New Plymouth.
- Ella Viola Fryer JP – of Dannevirke.
- Violet Patricia Harris – of Mount Maunganui.
- Gwendoline Lattey – of Palmerston North.
- Martha Iris McCurdy – of Southland,
- Ivy Elizabeth McGreevy – of Rotorua.
- Violet Adela Marie MacMillan – of Tauranga.
- Winifred Nora Mardon – of Palmerston North.
- Myra Isobel Mathewson – of Timaru.
- Dulcie Jessie Forrest Menzies – of Hamilton.
- The Reverend Father William Edward O'Donnell – of Petone.
- Roland Joshua Papps – of Nelson.
- Te Whairangi Kumeroa Ngoi Pewhairangi JP – of Tokomaru Bay.
- William Frank Ponder – of Lower Hutt.
- Elizabeth Colman Saunders – of Cambridge.
- Emily Shirley – of Nightcaps.
- Ralph Simpson – of Christchurch.
- Stuart Tichborne Campbell Sprott – of Wellington.
- Iris Myrtle Terry – of Palmerston North.
- Murray Thacker – of Banks Peninsula.
- Lily Elsie Walker – of Northland.
- Ronald Ernest Youngman – of Whangaparāoa.

=== For public services ===
- John Bell Brotherston – of Wanganui.
- Dr Allen Lindsay Bryant – of Hokitika.
- Robert Burt Cleland JP – of Stratford.
- Eldred Ronald Comer – of Temuka.
- Arthur Rae Cox JP – of Northland.
- Ronald Donovan – of Duvauchelle.
- Huia Gray Gilpin JP – of Christchurch.
- Peter Edward Graham – of Levin.
- Oswald Bayly Hawken – of Wanganui.
- Charles William Hawkins JP – of Hawke's Bay.
- Thomas William Horgan – chief instructor, Christchurch Prison, Department of Justice.
- Myrtle Jessie Kay – of Dunedin.
- Gordon Robert Kear JP – of Palmerston North.
- Hector Berkley Lawry JP – of Tokoroa.
- Mary Catherine McNamara – principal nurse, Braemar Hospital, Nelson.
- Peter Forbes Orr – sergeant, New Zealand Police.
- Owen Stanley Priest – of South Canterbury.
- Ellesmere John Stalker – of Christchurch
- Harold Strode – of Naseby.
- Robert Frew Watson – of Southland.
- Frederick Charles Yule JP – of Greytown.

== Queen's Fire Services Medal (QFSM) ==
- Sidney Raymond Hide – senior station officer (officer-in-charge, Mount Maunganui), Tauranga Fire Brigade.
- Leslie George Houston – volunteer station officer, New Plymouth Fire Brigade.
- Edwin Wallace Saunders – chief fire officer, Area Commander, 5D/1, Greymouth.

== Queen's Police Medal (QPM) ==
- Frederick Timothy Foley – lately constable, New Zealand Police.
- Anzac Thomas Paratene – constable, New Zealand Police.

== Royal Red Cross ==
=== Associate (ARRC) ===
- Lieutenant Colonel Lois Jones – Royal New Zealand Nursing Corps (Retired).

== Air Force Cross (AFC) ==
- Flight Lieutenant Nigel Albert Davey – Royal New Zealand Air Force.

== Queen's Commendation for Valuable Service in the Air ==
- Flight Lieutenant Bruce Reid Ferguson – Royal New Zealand Air Force.
- Flight Lieutenant Gordon Lennox Wood – Royal New Zealand Air Force.
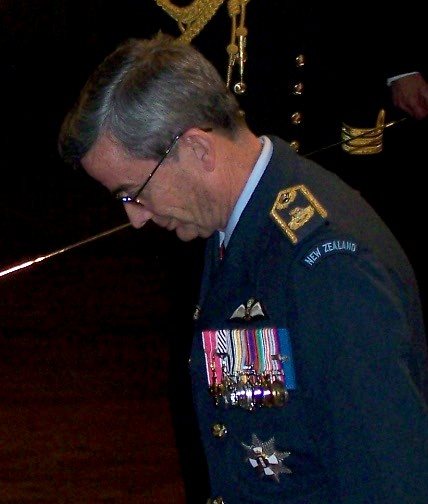
Bruce Ferguson
