= 1968 New Zealand gallantry awards =

New Zealand armed forces awards given in 1968

The 1968 New Zealand gallantry awards were announced via two Special Honours Lists dated 23 September and 8 October 1968, and recognised 14 New Zealand military personnel for gallantry and distinguished service in Malaysia and during operations in Vietnam.

== For actions in Malaysia ==
=== Queen's Commendation for Brave Conduct ===
- Private Kevin James Smallridge – Royal New Zealand Infantry Regiment (Regular Force).

== For actions in Vietnam ==
=== Order of the British Empire ===
==== Member (MBE) ====
Military division, additional

- Major John Airth Mace – Royal New Zealand Infantry Regiment.
- Major Thomas Gerald Martin – Royal Regiment of New Zealand Artillery.

=== Military Cross (MC) ===
- Lieutenant Maurice Francis Dodson – Royal New Zealand Infantry Regiment (Regular Force); of Christchurch
- Captain Anthony George Howell – Royal New Zealand Zealand Infantry Regiment.
- Major Brian Thomas Albert Worsnop – Royal New Zealand Infantry Regiment.

=== Distinguished Conduct Medal (DCM) ===
- Driver Ronald James Prichard – Royal New Zealand Army Service Corps.

=== Mentioned in despatches ===
- Corporal Hukarere Mamaeroa Bristowe – Royal New Zealand Infantry Regiment.
- Driver Richard Dick Dargaville – Royal New Zealand Army Service Corps.
- Captain and Quartermaster David Ralph Hughes – Royal New Zealand Army Ordnance Corps.
- Captain Russell James Martin – Royal Regiment of New Zealand Artillery.
- Sergeant John Russell Whitworth – Royal New Zealand Infantry Regiment.
- Corporal Howard Owen Wilson – Royal New Zealand Infantry Regiment.

=== Queen's Commendation for Brave Conduct ===
- Lance Bombardier Bruce Allan Wynyard – Royal Regiment of New Zealand Artillery (Regular Force).
