= 1973 Birthday Honours (New Zealand) =

Awards list for New Zealand

The 1973 Queen's Birthday Honours in New Zealand, celebrating the official birthday of Elizabeth II, were appointments made by the Queen on the advice of the New Zealand government to various orders and honours to reward and highlight good works by New Zealanders. They were announced on 2 June 1973.

The recipients of honours are displayed here as they were styled before their new honour.

== Order of the Bath ==
=== Companion (CB) ===
Military division

- Major-General Leslie Arthur Pearce CBE – Chief of the General Staff.

== Order of Saint Michael and Saint George ==
=== Knight Commander (KCMG) ===
- Professor Albert William Liley CMG – of Auckland. For distinguished services to medicine.
- Alister Donald McIntosh CMG – of Wellington. For devoted public service.

=== Companion (CMG) ===
- The Very Reverend Dr Ian Watson Fraser – of Linden. For humanitarian services over a wide field, particularly in respect of refugees.
- John Anthony James – of Wellington. For services to neurosurgery.
- Professor Neville Crompton Phillips – of Christchurch. For services in education.

== Order of the British Empire ==
=== Dame Commander (DBE) ===
Civil division

- Kathleen Agnes Niccol (Sister Mary Leo) MBE – of Auckland. For outstanding services to music.

=== Knight Commander (KBE) ===
Civil division

- George Charles Hart BEM – of Auckland. For outstanding philanthropy and services to manufacturing.

=== Commander (CBE) ===
Civil division

- The Honourable Norman Leslie Shelton – of Marton. For public services.
- Richard Spence Volkmann Simpson – of Lower Hutt. For services to education and the arts.
- Valdemar Reid Skellerup – of Christchurch. For philanthropy and services to industry.

Military division

- Air Commodore Richard Bruce Bolt DFC AFC – Assistant Chief of Defence Staff (Support), Royal New Zealand Air Force.
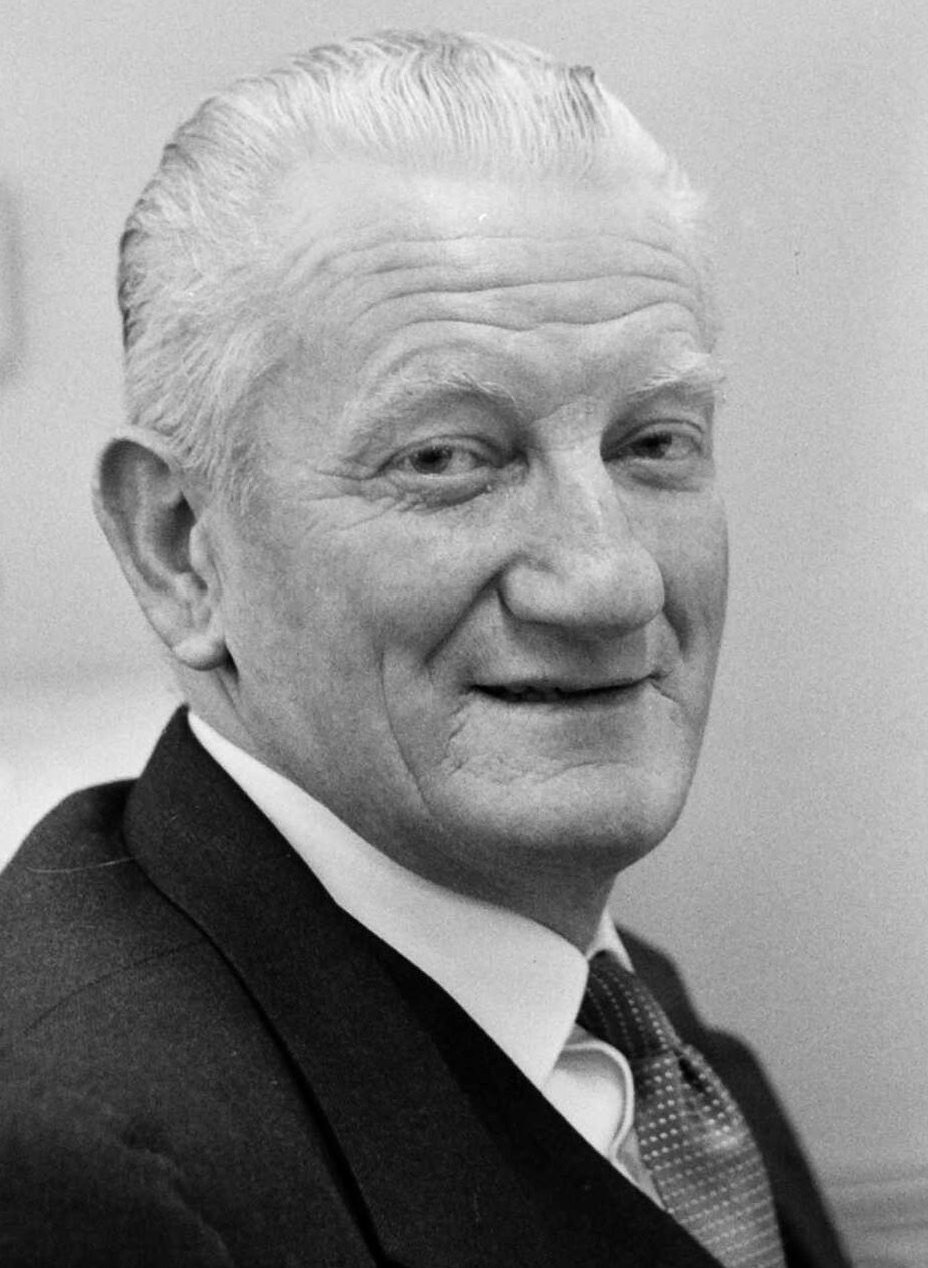
Norman Shelton

=== Officer (OBE) ===
Civil division

- Jeanie Eleanor Kirk-Burnnand – of Dunedin. For services to the community.
- Kennedy Berclay Burnside – Assistant Commissioner, New Zealand Police Force.
- Frank Chilton – of Christchurch. For services to the handicapped.
- The Reverend Father Francis James Green – of Waihi. For services to youth.
- Reginald Jones – of Christchurch. For services to technical education.
- Roderick Athelstane Keir – of Auckland. For services to technical education.
- Frederic McCarthy – of Auckland. For services to law and education.
- Ritchie Macdonald JP – of Auckland. For services to the community.
- George Matthew – of Wellington. For services to education.
- Doris Turner Nicholson – of Heretaunga. For services to the community.
- Kiri Janette Park (née Te Kanawa) – of Esher, Surrey. For services to music.
- Albert Henry Thomas Rose – of Christchurch. For services to the Lepers' Trust Board.
- Professor James Lawrence Wright – of Dunedin. For services to medicine.

Military division

- Commander Ronald Fletcher Faber VRD JP – Royal New Zealand Naval Volunteer Reserve.
- Lieutenant-Colonel Ralph Kenneth Grey Porter – Royal New Zealand Artillery (Regular Force).
- Group Captain Keith Rex Orsborn – Royal New Zealand Air Force.
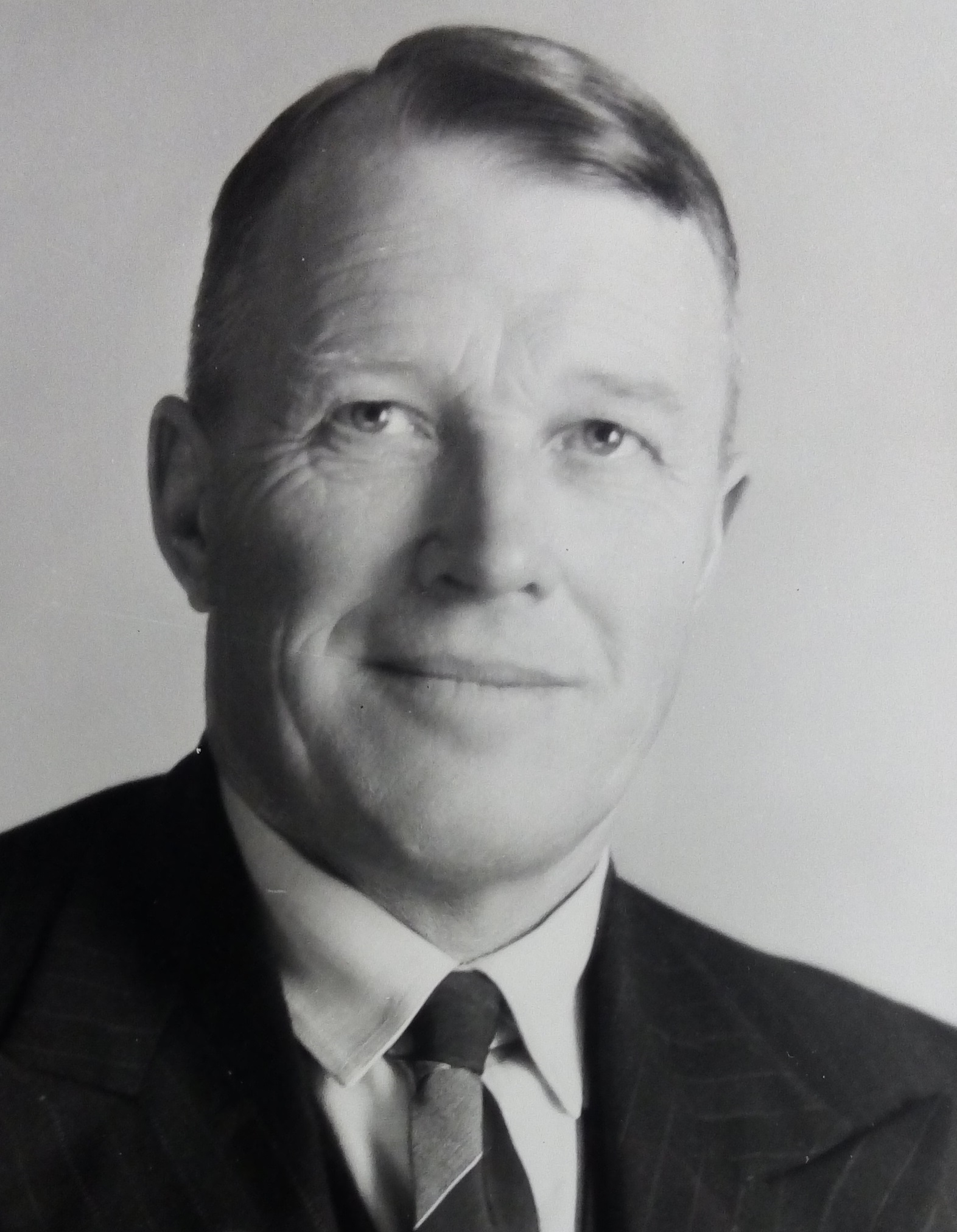
Ritchie Macdonald

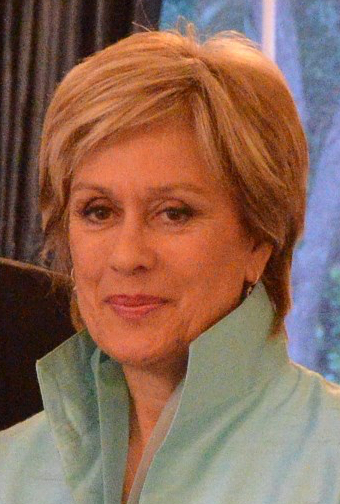
Kiri Te Kanawa

=== Member (MBE) ===
Civil division

- Alice Rosina Berridge – of Auckland. For services to education.
- Keith Wilbur Blackmore – of Alexandra. For services to local government.
- Viola Emily Blincoe – lieutenant-colonel, Salvation Army; of Heretaunga. For services to the community.
- Mary Wharton Christian – of Tauranga. For services to the community.
- Leslie Jonathan Fairbrother – of Carterton. For services to the community.
- Catherine May Garland – of Dunedin. For services to sport.
- George Glassey – of Ashburton. For public services.
- Rudall Charles Victor Hayward – of Auckland. For services to the community.
- Rangimarie Taheka Hetet – of Te Kūiti. For services to Māori art and culture.
- John Stanley Hunt – of Cromwell. For services to farming.
- Victor David Morrow Jacobson – of Marlborough. For services to medicine and the community.
- James Noel Laird – of Hāwera. For services to education.
- Keith Charles Malcolm – of Palmerston North. For services to scouting.
- Leslie Roy Mills – of Auckland. For services to sport.
- Agnes Annabel Grace Morgan – of Wellington. For services to the community.
- George Stanley O'Keefe – of Westport. For services to the community.
- John Billington Hayes Parry – of Auckland. For services to the community.
- Herbert Robinson Peers – of Christchurch. For services to education and care of the aged.
- Mana Rangi – of Tikitiki. For services to the community.
- William Antony Reed – of Nelson. For services to the community.
- Harold Harding Richmond – of Dunedin. For philanthropy and welfare services.
- Allan George Scott – of Morrinsville. For services to horticulture.
- Mavis Betty Evelyn Treloar – of Invercargill. For welfare services.
- Albert Veart MC – of Auckland. For services to lifesaving.
- George Hector Walker – chief fire officer, Stokes Valley Volunteer Fire Brigade.
- Joseph Victor Wallis – of Napier. For services to the community.
- James Richard Whitford JP – of Christchurch. For services to the community.

Military division

- Warrant Radioman Patrick George Campbell Green – Royal New Zealand Navy.
- Lieutenant Commander George Alfred Hannan – Royal New Zealand Navy.
- Honorary Lieutenant Samuel Johnson – Royal New Zealand Navy.
- Major Harold Thomas Harris ED – Royal New Zealand Armoured Corps (Territorial Force).
- Major Graeme Burnet Mackenzie Law – New Zealand Army Legal Service (Regular Force).
- Major Ivar Bojesen-Trepka – Royal New Zealand Infantry Regiment (Regular Force).
- Warrant Officer Denis Herbert Sidney Leggett – Royal New Zealand Air Force.
- Squadron Leader John Robert Wiltshier – Royal New Zealand Air Force.
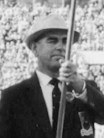
Les Mills

== Companion of the Imperial Service Order (ISO) ==
- Joseph William Allen – sectional officer, Legislative Department.

== British Empire Medal (BEM) ==
Civil division

- Leila Genevra Bassett – of Motueka. For services to the community.
- Clarice Gledhill Chivers – of New Plymouth. For services to the community.
- Margaret Cooper – of Auckland. For services to the community.
- Joseph Fahey – of Lawrence. For services to the community.
- Robert Bruce Frankham – of Hamilton. For services to swimming.
- James Craigie Glass – of Timaru. For services to art and culture.
- Margaret Mary Hall – of Fox Glacier. For services to youth, recreation and training.
- Geoffrey Lawrence Hocquard – of Marlborough. For services to sport.
- George Allan Wilton Keast – of Pahiatua. For services to the community and dairying.
- Jocelyn Edna Looker – of Hamilton. For services to the community and to music.
- James Smith – of Coromandel. For services to the community, in particular safety at sea.
- Jean Ann Smith – of Clarkville. For services to the community.
- Elizabeth Stinson – of Christchurch. For services to nursing and in community affairs.

Military division

- Chief Petty Officer Cook Raymond Lionel Norman Ford – Royal New Zealand Navy.
- Corporal Albert Collins – Royal New Zealand Infantry Regiment (Regular Force).
- Sergeant Maurice Edwards – Royal New Zealand Infantry Regiment (Territorial Force).
- Flight Sergeant Colin Newman Carmichael – Royal New Zealand Air Force.
- Flight Sergeant Robert Neill – Royal New Zealand Air Force.
- Flight Sergeant Brian Alfred Wakelam – Royal New Zealand Air Force.
