= 1967 New Zealand gallantry awards =

Awards list for New Zealand

The 1967 New Zealand gallantry awards were announced via two Special Honours Lists dated 20 January and 16 May 1967, and recognised five New Zealand military personnel for gallant and distinguished services in operations during the Indonesia–Malaysia confrontation.

== Distinguished Service Cross (DSC) ==
- Lieutenant Commander Peter Norman Wright – Royal New Zealand Navy; of Wellington.

== Distinguished Service Medal (DSM) ==
- Able Seaman Charles Kenneth Taylor – Royal New Zealand Navy; of Greymouth.

== Mentioned in despatches ==
- Sergeant Graeme Cecil Faulkner – Royal New Zealand Infantry Regiment; of Burnham.
- Lieutenant Colonel Brian Matauru Poananga MBE – Royal New Zealand Infantry Regiment; serving in Malaysia.
- Corporal (Temporary Sergeant) Kenneth Michael Schimanski – 1st Ranger Squadron, New Zealand Special Air Service; of Palmerston North.
