= John Plimmer =

British settler and businessman (1812–1905)

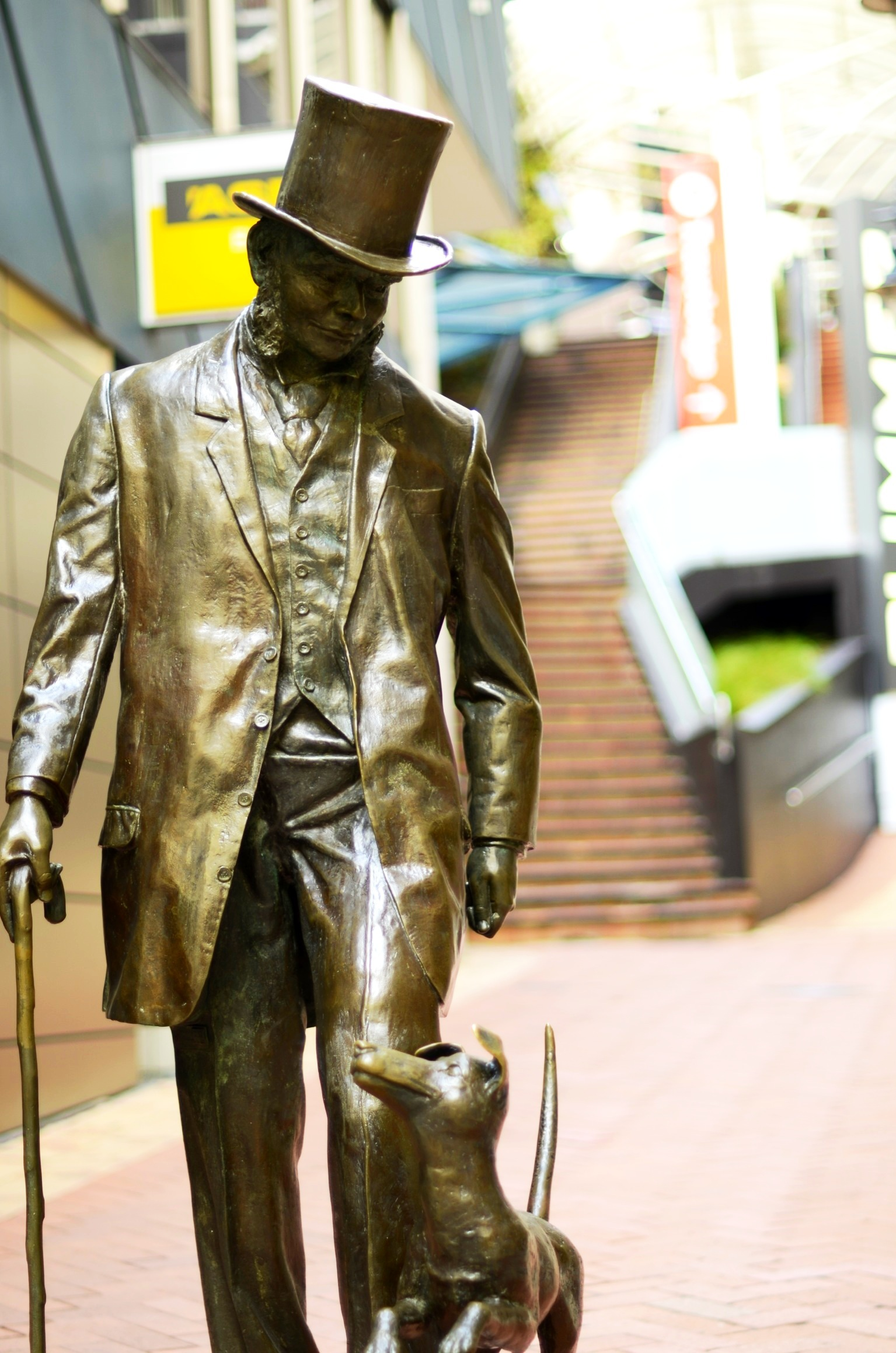
- Statue of John Plimmer and his dog Fritz at Plimmers Steps
- Born: John Plimmer; 28 June 1812; Shrewsbury, Shropshire, England
- Died: 5 January 1905 (aged 92); Wellington, New Zealand
- Occupation: Entrepreneur
- Spouse(s): Mary Roden (1833–?); Janet Anderson(1864–1905)
- Children: 8, including Henry

John Plimmer (28 June 1812 – 5 January 1905) was an English settler and entrepreneur in New Zealand who was the self-styled "Father of Wellington".

== Early life in England ==
Plimmer was born at a village called in contemporary accounts "Upton-under-Amon" near Shrewsbury, Shropshire, England on 28 June 1812, youngest but one of 12 children of Isaac Plimmer, builder and timber merchant, and his wife Mary (nee Roden). Identifiably the village is Upton Magna, which lies under Haughmond Hill, where he was baptised on 19 July that year.

Educated at a local parish school, he was intended for teaching but preferred to train as a plasterer and master builder. He practised the trades at Willenhall, Staffordshire from after his father moved there until his own emigration and it was at Birmingham in that area he first married, to Mary Roden who was a probable cousin, in 1833.

== Life in New Zealand ==
He arrived in Wellington from England on the ship Gertrude in 1841. As an entrepreneur in 1851 he purchased the stranded whaling ship Inconstant and converted the hull into a warehouse and one of the first piers in Wellington. It became known as "Plimmer's Ark", a centre of business in early Wellington, used as an auction house, customs office and lighthouse.

He was a member of the Wellington Provincial Council from 1856 to 1857, the first Wellington Town Board (1863) and was on the Wellington City Council from 1870 to 1871.

His first wife Eliza died in 1862, and he married Janet Anderson in 1864. In 1885 Janet Plimmer was the founding secretary for the Wellington branch of the Women's Christian Temperance Union New Zealand.

His principal public service was the organisation of the Wellington and Manawatu Railway Company between 1880 and 1886. The township (now a suburb) of Plimmerton, on the Wellington - Manawatu Line built by the company, was named after him.

== Legacy ==
He is buried at Bolton Street Memorial Park, and his grave is part of the memorial trail.

There is a statue of him at the bottom of Plimmer Steps off Lambton Quay, Wellington.

The McKinnon brothers Don, Ian, John and Malcolm are great-great-grandsons of Plimmer.

The Plimmer Towers office complex is named after him.

In 2009, Plimmer was posthumously inducted into the New Zealand Business Hall of Fame.
