= Leonard Thornton =

New Zealand general (1916–1999)

Sir Leonard Thornton
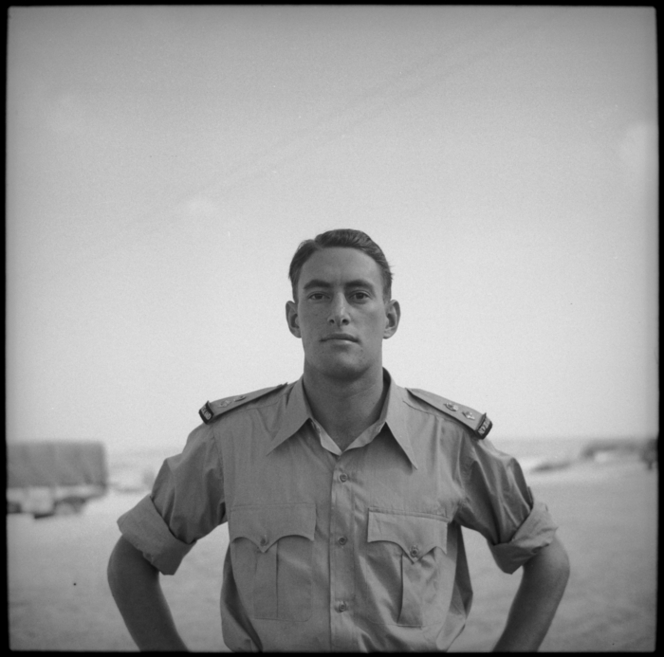
- Lieutenant Colonel Leonard Thornton in 1943
- Born: 15 October 1916; Christchurch, New Zealand
- Died: 10 June 1999 (aged 82); Wellington, New Zealand
- Spouse: Gladys Janet Sloman
- Military career
- Allegiance: New Zealand
- Branch: New Zealand Army
- Service years: 1934–1971
- Rank: Lieutenant General
- Service number: 20010
- Commands: Chief of the Defence Staff; Chief of the General Staff; 5th Field Regiment
- Conflicts: Second World War; Battle of Greece; Battle of Crete; North African campaign; Italian campaign
- Awards: Knight Commander of the Order of the Bath; Commander of the Order of the British Empire; Mentioned in Despatches (2)
- Other work: Ambassador of New Zealand to Vietnam (1972–74)

Lieutenant General Sir Leonard Whitmore Thornton, KCB, CBE (15 October 1916 – 10 June 1999) was a senior officer in the New Zealand Army.

Born in Christchurch, Thornton joined the Royal New Zealand Artillery in 1937 after having been encouraged by his uncle, Leonard Isitt, to pursue a military career. He served throughout the Second World War in a number of artillery and staff posts. Shortly after the war, he was appointed the commander of the artillery of the 2nd New Zealand Division. After holding a series of senior posts in the New Zealand Army, including a period as its commander, he was appointed Chief of the Defence Staff in 1965 for a six-year term. Knighted in 1967, he was later the New Zealand ambassador to the Republic of Vietnam. He died in 1999 at the age of 82.

== Early life ==
Thornton was born in Christchurch on 15 October 1916. His parents were Cuthbert John Thornton and Frances Caverhill Thornton (née Isitt). He received his education at Christchurch Boys' High School, where he was a pupil from 1930 to 1933. His uncle, Leonard Isitt, was at the time the commander of the RNZAF air base in Hobsonville and he encouraged Thornton to also join the military. At the age of 17, he was awarded a scholarship to the Royal Military College in Duntroon, Australia. He was one of four cadets from New Zealand, the first intake from this country to enter Duntroon since 1921. A good student, he was also an accomplished athlete, participating in several sports. When he graduated from Duntroon, he was awarded the King's Medal for academic excellence for finishing first in his class.

== Military career ==
=== Second World War ===
Thornton was commissioned in the Royal New Zealand Artillery in December 1937 as a lieutenant. After a period of further training in Australia on coastal artillery, he was posted to Wellington as an instructor. Following the outbreak of the Second World War, he was posted to 5th Field Regiment, the second of the artillery regiments to be raised for service abroad with the Second New Zealand Expeditionary Force (2NZEF), as its adjutant. The regiment was attached to the 4th Infantry Brigade of the 2nd New Zealand Division. However, he was later transferred to 25 Battery, 4th Field Regiment, as a battery captain.

The 2nd New Zealand Division was to be formed in three echelons, which would assemble in Egypt. Thornton embarked with the first echelon on 6 January 1940 which arrived in Egypt at Maadi Camp, the main 2NZEF base in the Middle East, on 11 February. He led 25 Battery during the Battle of Greece, which helped cover the Allied retreats at Platamon and Tempe before it was evacuated to the island of Crete. His battery, having lost its guns, fought as infantry during the subsequent Battle of Crete after which it was transported to Egypt. Here he took command of 43 Anti-Aircraft Battery. In February 1942, as the division was re-organised in Egypt and Syria following its losses in Operation Crusader, Thornton was made brigade major of the 6th Infantry Brigade and in May married Wellington VAD Janet Sloman in Haifa.

Thornton returned to the artillery in September 1942 as second-in-command of 4th Field Regiment, but the following month he was posted to the staff of the division. Here he came to the attention of its commander, Major General Bernard Freyberg, for the quality of his operational work.In June 1943, Thornton, promoted to lieutenant colonel, was given command of 5th Field Regiment. By now, the conflict in North Africa was over with the surrender of the Afrika Korps, and the New Zealanders were transferred to Italy to participate in the campaign there.

When the New Zealand Corps was established for the Battle of Monte Cassino in March 1944, Thornton was made General Staff Officer of the 2nd New Zealand Division. Although he returned to command of the 5th Field Regiment after the dissolution of the New Zealand Corps, Freyberg brought him back to the divisional staff as its senior operations officer. Shortly after the war ended in Europe, he was promoted to brigadier, the youngest in the 2NZEF at the time, and appointed commander of the divisional artillery. For his services in the war, he was appointed as an Officer of the Order of the British Empire and had also twice been mentioned in despatches.

=== Postwar career ===
After the war, Thornton performed occupation duties with Jayforce, in Japan, where he was the Senior British Liaison Officer in the Tokyo sub-area. He returned to New Zealand in July 1946 to serve as a staff officer at Army Headquarters. In 1948 he commenced a two-year term as Deputy Chief of Staff and during this time he worked towards the implementation of a compulsory military training scheme for the Territorial Force, which commenced in May 1950. He was dispatched to England in 1952 to attend the Imperial Defence College after which he led the New Zealand Joint Services Liaison Staff in London. During this time, in which New Zealand's military affairs were dominated by the country's involvement in the Korean War, Thornton began to demonstrate the diplomatic skills that would prove useful during his later career. In 1953, he was awarded the Queen Elizabeth II Coronation Medal.

In 1955, Thornton returned to New Zealand to serve as the Quartermaster General of the New Zealand Army, and this was followed as a term from 1956 to 1958 as its Adjutant General. In the 1957 Queen's Birthday Honours, he was appointed Commander of the Order of the British Empire.

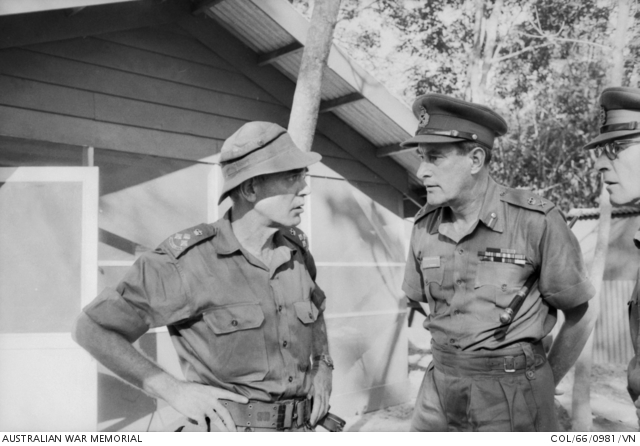
Thornton as Chief of the Defence Staff, speaks with 1st Australian Task Force commander Brigadier O. D. Jackson at Nui Dat in June 1966

New Zealand had become a member of the South East Asian Treaty Organisation (SEATO) in 1955, and in July 1958 Thornton moved to Bangkok, where he served as head of the Military Planning Office of SEATO. In this capacity, he gained valuable insight in the scenarios in which New Zealand's military might be expected to play a part. The following year he was promoted to acting major general and appointed Chief of the General Staff (CGS), the youngest ever to serve in this role which was effectively the commander of the New Zealand Army. This was to prove a challenging term for Thornton for, driven by the Labour Government, there was a significant change in New Zealand defence policy. Since the Second World War, defence planning had been based around the concept of an infantry division being raised largely from the Territorial Force. This had now changed to a self-sufficient brigade-sized force made up of a combination of Regular and Territorial Force personnel. While not a policy Thornton personally agreed with, he oversaw the reorganisation that was required to achieve the desired structure and this saw some longstanding regiments being amalgamated. In the 1962 New Year Honours, part way through his term as CGS, he was made a Companion of the Order of the Bath.

In 1965, the independence of the New Zealand Army from the other armed services was ended, and the New Zealand Defence Force, combining the army, navy and airforce, was established. Thornton was the second Chief of Defence Staff, succeeding Vice Admiral Sir Peter Phipps, and went on to complete a six-year term in this capacity, after which he retired from the army in the rank of lieutenant general in October 1971. He had been made a Knight Commander of the Order of the Bath in the 1967 Queen's Birthday Honours.

== Family and later life ==
In May 1942, Thornton married Gladys Sloman in Haifa, Palestine. His wife was a sergeant with the New Zealand Voluntary Aid Detachment (VAD). They were to have three sons, two of whom would also choose a military career. His wife died in 1969. In November 1971, Thornton married Ruth Leicester; this was a month after his retirement from the military. His wife held a senior role with the Ministry of Foreign Affairs.

Thornton was appointed as New Zealand's ambassador to the Republic of Vietnam in 1972 and during this time, he also represented the country's affairs in Cambodia. Despite his retirement as a diplomat in 1974, Thornton maintained a relatively high profile in the public sector. Until 1983, he served as the chair of the Alcoholic Liquor Advisory Council and often commented on defence issues, particularly on New Zealand's anti-nuclear stance as well as the Australia, New Zealand, United States Security Treaty. At one stage, he was criticised by the then Prime Minister of New Zealand, David Lange, for his views. He also presented several documentaries on various aspects of New Zealand's military history. He died on 10 June 1999 at the age of 82 and was survived by his second wife by nearly two decades.

== Notes ==
Military offices
Preceded by Vice Admiral Sir Peter Phipps	Chief of the Defence Staff; 1965–1971	Succeeded by Lieutenant General Sir Richard Webb
Preceded by Major General Sir Stephen Weir	Chief of the General Staff; 1960–1965	Succeeded by Major General Walter McKinnon
