= Don McIver =

New Zealand military officer

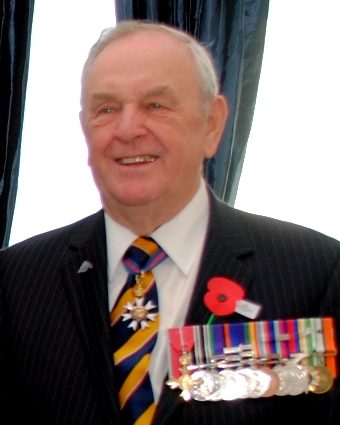
- McIver in 2011
- Born: 22 January 1936; Auckland, New Zealand
- Died: 22 August 2016 (aged 80)
- Military career
- Allegiance: New Zealand
- Branch: New Zealand Army
- Service years: 1952–1991
- Rank: Lieutenant General
- Commands: Multinational Force and Observers (1989–91); Chief of the General Staff (1987–89)
- Conflicts: Malayan Emergency; Indonesia–Malaysia confrontation Vietnam War
- Awards: Companion of the Order of St Michael and St George; Officer of the Order of the British Empire
- Other work: Director of the New Zealand Security Intelligence Service (1991–99); President of the Returned and Services' Association (2010–14)

Lieutenant General Donald Stuart McIver, CMG, OBE, (22 January 1936 – 22 August 2016) was a New Zealand military officer who was the Chief of the General Staff (1987–1989) and the director of the New Zealand Security Intelligence Service (1991–1999).

During the Vietnam War he served as the 2IC of the final regiment of combined Australian and New Zealand infantry, 4 RAR/NZ (ANZAC) of the 1st Australian Task Force in 1971.

In the 1981 New Year Honours, McIver was appointed an Officer of the Order of the British Empire. He was made a Companion of the Order of St Michael and St George in the 1995 Queen's Birthday Honours.

Military offices
| Preceded by Major General John Mace | Chief of the General Staff; 1987–1989 | Succeeded by Major General Bruce Meldrum |
| Preceded by Lieutenant General Egil Ingebrigsten | Force Commander, Multinational Force and Observers; 1989–1991 | Succeeded by Lieutenant General J.W.C. van Ginkel |
Government offices
| Preceded by Lindsay Smith | Director of the New Zealand Security Intelligence Service; 1991–1999 | Succeeded by Richard Woods |
