= Peter Davis (sociologist) =

New Zealand sociologist (born 1947)

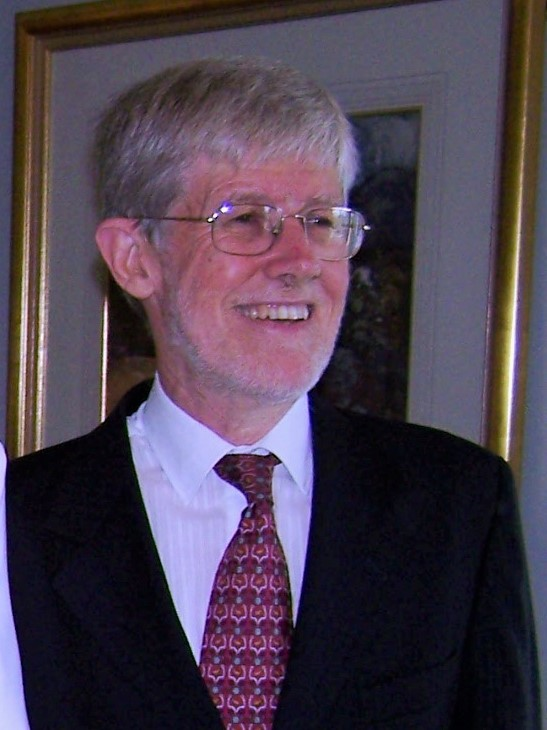
- Davis in 2010

Spouse of the Prime Minister of New Zealand
- In role 10 December 1999 – 19 November 2008
- Prime Minister: Helen Clark
- Preceded by: Burton Shipley
- Succeeded by: Bronagh Key

Personal details
- Born: Peter Byard Davis; 25 April 1947 (age 79) Milford on Sea, Hampshire, England
- Party: Labour
- Spouse: Helen Clark (m. 1981)

Academic background
- Education: University of Southampton (BA); London School of Economics (MSc); University of Auckland (PhD)
- Thesis: A sociological analysis of the relationship between the formal and informal sectors of dental care in New Zealand (1984)

Academic work
- Discipline: Sociology
- Institutions: University of Canterbury; University of Otago; University of Auckland
- Website: University website

Peter Byard Davis (born 25 April 1947) is a New Zealand sociologist, professor, and the husband of Helen Clark, who was the prime minister of New Zealand from 1999 to 2008.

== Early life ==
Davis was born in Milford on Sea, Hampshire, England, on 25 April 1947, and spent his childhood in Tanzania, where his father worked for a mining company. His father was born in China and his mother in India, but a great-great-grandfather had grown up in New Zealand. He was educated at Bradfield College. Davis gained a master's degree in sociology and statistics at the London School of Economics. He moved to New Zealand in 1970 to work at the University of Canterbury and completed a PhD at the University of Auckland. He became a naturalised New Zealander in 1972. He was part of a team investigating oral health in New Zealand and was joint editor of the Australian and New Zealand Journal of Sociology. In 1976 he was appointed a lecturer at the University of Auckland school of medicine.

In 1980 he stood unsuccessfully for the Auckland City Council on a Labour Party ticket. In 1988 he was elected to the Auckland Regional Authority for the Mount Albert ward.

== Personal life ==
Davis met Clark, then a political-science lecturer at Auckland, in 1977 and they married in 1981.

== Career ==
Davis specialises in medical sociology, and from 2004 to 2017 worked as the Director of the COMPASS (Centre of Methods and Policy Application in the Social Sciences) Research Centre he established at the University of Auckland. In 2014 he was awarded a James Cook Research Fellowship for a research project titled "New Zealand as a 'social laboratory'". He is now Professor Emeritus in the School of Population Health and Honorary Professor in the Department of Statistics at the University of Auckland. Previously he served as Professor of Public Health at the University of Otago's Christchurch School of Medicine.

He has previously served on the Auckland Area Health Board, and was a representative in 1989 when his wife (Health Minister at the time) suspended that body. Davis has achieved international recognition in his field, having worked as a consultant for the World Health Organization.

In 2019 Davis became a City Vision candidate for the Auckland District Health Board and was subsequently elected.

He is a trustee and former chair of The Helen Clark Foundation board, an organisation he helped found in 2019.

== Notes ==
Honorary titles
Preceded by Margaret Palmer	Spouse of the Deputy Prime Minister of New Zealand; 1989–1990	Succeeded by Clare de Lore
Preceded by Burton Shipley	Spouse of the Prime Minister of New Zealand; 1999–2008	Succeeded by Bronagh Key
