= Don McKinnon =

New Zealand politician

The Right Honourable Sir Don McKinnon ONZ GCVO
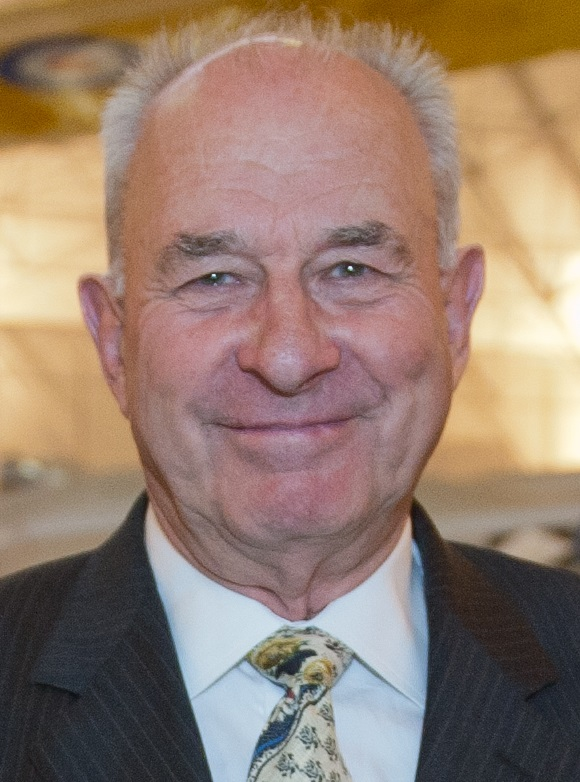
- McKinnon in 2012

4th Secretary-General of the Commonwealth of Nations
- In office 1 April 2000 – 31 March 2008
- Head: Elizabeth II
- Chair: Thabo Mbeki (South Africa); John Howard (Australia); Olusegun Obasanjo (Nigeria); Lawrence Gonzi (Malta); Yoweri Museveni (Uganda)
- Preceded by: Emeka Anyaoku
- Succeeded by: Kamalesh Sharma

12th Deputy Prime Minister of New Zealand
- In office 2 November 1990 – 16 December 1996
- Prime Minister: Jim Bolger
- Preceded by: Helen Clark
- Succeeded by: Winston Peters

24th Minister of Foreign Affairs
- In office 2 November 1990 – 5 December 1999
- Prime Minister: Jim Bolger; Jenny Shipley
- Preceded by: Mike Moore
- Succeeded by: Phil Goff

Member of the New Zealand Parliament for Albany Rodney (1984–1987)
- In office 25 November 1978 – 12 October 1996
- Preceded by: Seat established
- Succeeded by: Murray McCully

Member of the New Zealand Parliament for National party list
- In office 12 October 1996 – 6 March 2000
- Succeeded by: Arthur Anae (Note: Normally, list MPs do not have individual predecessors or successors, but McKinnon resigned during a sitting parliament and therefore was succeeded by Anae.)

Personal details
- Born: Donald Charles McKinnon; 27 February 1939 (age 87) London, England
- Party: National
- Spouse: Clare de Lore (m. 1995)
- Children: 5
- Relatives: Walter McKinnon (father); Ian McKinnon (brother); John McKinnon (brother); Malcolm McKinnon (brother)

Sir Donald Charles McKinnon (born 27 February 1939) is a New Zealand politician who served as the 12th deputy prime minister of New Zealand and the minister of Foreign Affairs of New Zealand. He was the fourth secretary-general of the Commonwealth of Nations from 2000 until 2008.

== Early life ==
McKinnon was born in Blackheath, London. His father was Major-General Walter McKinnon, CB CBE, a New Zealand Chief of the General Staff, and once Chairman of New Zealand Broadcasting Corporation. McKinnon's brothers include the twins John McKinnon, the former New Zealand Secretary of Defence and a former Ambassador to China, and Malcolm McKinnon, an editor and academic, and Ian McKinnon, Pro-Chancellor of Victoria University of Wellington, School Headmaster of Scots College and former Deputy Mayor of Wellington. The McKinnon brothers are great-great-grandsons of John Plimmer, known as the "father of Wellington".

McKinnon was educated at Khandallah School and then Nelson College from 1952 to 1953. In 1956, he graduated from Woodrow Wilson High School, in Washington, D.C. McKinnon later spent a "lengthy period" in the Bighorn Mountains in Wyoming. He undertook study at Lincoln Agricultural College, New Zealand. After leaving university, he became a farm manager, and later a farm management consultant. In 1974, he became a real estate agent. In his spare time, he also worked as a rehabilitation tutor in prisons.

== Member of Parliament ==
New Zealand Parliament
Years	Term	Electorate	List	Party
1978–1981	39th	Albany		National
1981–1984	40th	Albany		National
1984–1987	41st	Rodney		National
1987–1990	42nd	Albany		National
1990–1993	43rd	Albany		National
1993–1996	44th	Albany		National
1996–1999	45th	List	2	National
1999–2000	46th	List	3	National

In the elections of 1969 and 1972, McKinnon stood unsuccessfully as the National Party's candidate in the Birkenhead electorate, having previously served on two of the party's electorate committees. In the election of 1978, McKinnon won the newly established seat of Albany, which covered much of the same area.

In 1980, McKinnon was made the government's junior Whip. Two years later, he was made senior Whip. When Prime Minister Robert Muldoon called the snap election of 1984, and was defeated by David Lange's New Zealand Labour Party, McKinnon remained senior Whip for his party in Opposition. In September 1987, following National's defeat at the August election, he became deputy leader of the National Party after defeating Ruth Richardson for the position by just one vote. He was also appointed Shadow Minister of Defence and Shadow Minister of Health by leader Jim Bolger.

=== Cabinet minister ===
When National, then led by Jim Bolger, won the 1990 election, McKinnon became Deputy Prime Minister. He also became Minister of Foreign Affairs and Trade and Minister of Pacific Island Affairs. During his tenure in the former role, he oversaw New Zealand's election to the UN Security Council, increased activity in the Commonwealth of Nations, and attempts to broker a truce on the island of Bougainville. He received recognition as a result of the Bougainville negotiations.

In 1996, the National Party required the support of the New Zealand First party to form a government, and part of the coalition agreement gave the office of Deputy Prime Minister to New Zealand First leader Winston Peters. McKinnon kept his role as Minister of Foreign Affairs, however, and also became Minister of Disarmament and Arms Control. When the coalition with New Zealand First collapsed, McKinnon did not resume the Deputy Prime Minister's role as he had been replaced beforehand as Deputy National Party leader by Wyatt Creech and therefore Creech became Deputy Prime Minister instead, although he did gain the minor responsibility of Minister in Charge of War Pensions. McKinnon retired from parliament shortly after the 1999 election, being replaced by Arthur Anae.

== Secretary-General of the Commonwealth ==
During his time as New Zealand's Minister of Foreign Affairs, McKinnon had been highly involved with the Commonwealth. At the Commonwealth Heads of Government Meeting 1999 (CHOGM), in Durban, he was elected to the office of Secretary General. Since that time, he has had to deal with issues such as Zimbabwe's Robert Mugabe and George Speight's attempted nationalist coup in Fiji. McKinnon has also placed an emphasis on supporting "good governance".

In late 2003, New Zealand media reported that Zimbabwe was attempting to gather support from other Commonwealth members to remove McKinnon from the office of Secretary-General, presumably in retaliation for McKinnon's views about the issue of Zimbabwean democracy. The government of Zimbabwe denied that it was making any such efforts.

At the opening of the 2003 CHOGM, in Nigeria on 5 December, McKinnon was challenged for the position of Secretary-General by Lakshman Kadirgamar, a former Foreign Minister of Sri Lanka. However, McKinnon defeated Kadirgamar in a vote reported to be 40–11 in McKinnon's favour.

McKinnon received an Honorary Doctorate from Heriot-Watt University in 2005

In 2007 McKinnon attempted to mediate between Fiji and the Australian and New Zealand governments in their continuing dispute over the appropriate timetable and rules for the holding of Fijian election in 2008.

In a 2007 interview McKinnon criticised British public support for evicted white farmers in Zimbabwe as being "a bit of a guilt thing" and argued that the evictions were justified as there was "no way you can justify a society where 15,000 white farmers control 80 per cent of the most fertile land".

In the 2008 New Year Honours, McKinnon was appointed as a Member of the Order of New Zealand (ONZ), New Zealand's highest civilian honour.

In 2009, McKinnon was appointed a Knight Grand Cross of the Royal Victorian Order (GCVO) for services to the Commonwealth. He is a vice-president of the Royal Commonwealth Society.

== Legacy ==
Don McKinnon Drive is named after McKinnon, in his former electorate of Albany.

In April 2013, McKinnon released his memoirs of his time as Secretary General of the Commonwealth, entitled In The Ring.

McKinnon is chairman of the Global Panel Foundation Australasia, a non-governmental organisation that works in crisis areas around the world.

== Personal life ==
McKinnon is married to his second wife, former journalist Clare de Lore, and together they have a son. McKinnon also has four other children from a previous marriage.

New Zealand Parliament
New constituency	Member of Parliament for Albany; 1978–1984 1987–1996	Vacant Constituency abolished, recreated in 1987 Title next held by himself
Vacant Constituency abolished in 1984 Title last held by himself	Member of Parliament for Albany; 1978–1984 1987–1996	Succeeded by Murray McCully
Vacant Constituency abolished in 1978 Title last held by Peter Wilkinson	Member of Parliament for Rodney; 1984–1987	Vacant Constituency abolished, recreated in 1996 Title next held by Lockwood Smith
Political offices
Preceded by Chief Emeka Anyaoku	Secretary-General for the Commonwealth; 2000–2008	Succeeded by Kamalesh Sharma
Preceded by Mike Moore	Minister of Foreign Affairs; 1990–1999	Succeeded by Phil Goff
Preceded by Helen Clark	Deputy Prime Minister of New Zealand; 1990–1996	Succeeded by Winston Peters
