= Ian McKinnon =

New Zealand politician

Ian McKinnon CNZM QSO JP
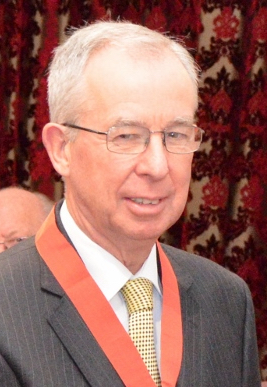
- McKinnon in 2013

22nd Deputy Mayor of Wellington
- In office 2007–2013
- Mayor: Kerry Prendergast; Celia Wade-Brown
- Preceded by: Alick Shaw
- Succeeded by: Justin Lester

Personal details
- Born: Ian Duncan McKinnon; 21 April 1943 (age 83) Wellington, New Zealand
- Relatives: Walter McKinnon (father); Don McKinnon (brother); John McKinnon (brother); Malcolm McKinnon (brother)
- Occupation: Headmaster, education consultant, Pro-Chancellor

Ian Duncan McKinnon (born 21 April 1943) is a New Zealand educator and local politician, and is a former deputy mayor of Wellington.

== Education ==
McKinnon was educated at Nelson College from 1957 to 1961. He went on to Victoria University of Wellington, where he graduated with a BCom, and The University of Auckland, where he was awarded a DipEd.

== Career ==
=== Teacher administrator ===
McKinnon began his teaching career at King's College, Auckland. He has been Headmaster of a number of prominent private schools in New Zealand, including Wanganui Collegiate School (1980–88), and Scots College (1992–2002). He was also Lower Master at Eton College in the UK from 1988.

At Wanganui Collegiate, he steered the school through a period of sustained pupil growth, despite the fall-off of its traditional catchment area – the education of central North Island farmers' sons, in the wake of the removal of state produce subsidies.

=== Educational consultancy work ===
Since 2002, McKinnon has practised as an education consultant. He was appointed Chairman of the Correspondence School and until its merger with Victoria University of Wellington was Chairman of the Council of the Wellington College of Education.

He is on the University Council of Victoria University of Wellington, after being Chancellor for a number of years.

=== Local government ===
In 2004 McKinnon was elected to the Wellington City Council for the Lambton Ward. He served as Deputy Mayor of Wellington from 2007 until 2013 first under Kerry Prendergast then Celia Wade-Brown. He retired from the city council at the 2013 local government elections, and was succeeded by Justin Lester as Deputy Mayor.

In 2016 he was elected to the Wellington Regional Council.

In 2019 McKinnon announced that he would not be standing for re-election to the Wellington Regional Council, on which he has been a councillor since 2016.

== Honours and awards ==
In 1990, McKinnon was awarded the New Zealand 1990 Commemoration Medal, and in the 1991 Queen's Birthday Honours, he was appointed a Companion of the Queen's Service Order for community service. In the 2013 Queen's Birthday Honours, McKinnon was appointed a Companion of the New Zealand Order of Merit, for services to education and the community. He was made a Freeman of the City of London in 1992, and is a justice of the peace.

== Family connections ==
McKinnon has a number of famous siblings, including Don McKinnon – a former New Zealand Deputy Prime Minister and Secretary-General of the Commonwealth, and Malcolm McKinnon – a university professor at Victoria University of Wellington. John McKinnon is New Zealand Defence Secretary.

McKinnon's father was Chief of General Staff, Major General Walter McKinnon, CB, CBE. The McKinnon brothers are great-great-grandsons of John Plimmer, known as the father of Wellington.

Political offices
| Preceded by Alick Shaw | Deputy Mayor of Wellington; 2007–2013 | Succeeded by Justin Lester |
