= Rose King (army officer) =

New Zealand army officer

- King in 2024
- Born: Rose Teresa Willemsen; Whanganui, New Zealand
- Spouse: Glenn King
- Children: 2
- Military career
- Allegiance: New Zealand
- Branch: New Zealand Army
- Service years: 1991–present
- Rank: Major general
- Commands: Chief of Army
- Conflicts: War in Afghanistan
- Awards: NATO Meritorious Service Medal; Meritorious Service Medal (United States); Army Commendation Medal (United States)
- Other work: Joint head of MIQ

Major General Rose Teresa King (née Willemsen) is a New Zealand Army officer, currently serving as the Chief of Army since June 2024. King joined the army in 1991 and was commissioned into the Royal New Zealand Electrical and Mechanical Engineers. She was promoted to brigadier in 2021, the first woman career officer to attain that rank in the New Zealand Army, and served as joint head of managed isolation and quarantine (MIQ) during the COVID-19 pandemic in New Zealand. King served as Deputy Chief of Army from December 2021, before being appointed Chief of Army. She is the first woman to attain general officer rank in the New Zealand Defence Force and the first to be appointed as a service chief.

== Biography ==
King was born in Whanganui.

King joined the New Zealand Army in 1991. She started at the base in Waiouru, attending the Officer Cadet School. She graduated into the Royal New Zealand Electrical and Mechanical Engineers Corps as a second lieutenant in June 1992. Her deployments include Croatia and Afghanistan.

In May 2021, King was promoted to the rank of brigadier from general-list officer at a ceremony led by Chief of Defence Force, Air Marshal Kevin Short. She is the first general-list woman officer to be afforded this rank. There are two special officer women brigadiers. Chief of Army, Major General John Boswell, said of the promotion, "This promotion is a significant occasion; not just for Rose, but for the NZ Army also."

In June 2021, King was seconded as joint head of MIQ, alongside Megan Main. King succeeded Brigadier Jim Bliss after his six-month secondment. MIQ was run by the Ministry of Business, Innovation and Employment as part of New Zealand's all-of-government COVID-19 national response border measures, and was implemented in April 2020.

King's husband, Lieutenant Colonel Glenn King, also serves in the Defence Force, and they have two children.

On the 23rd of October 2026, King was appointed as acting Chief of Defence for 2 days following the resignation of Air Marshal Tony Davies.
