= Malcolm McKinnon =

New Zealand historian

Malcolm Arthur McKinnon (born 1950) is a New Zealand historian and political historian. McKinnon's work largely focuses on the history of New Zealand and New Zealand's international relations. McKinnon has held a number of editorial roles, including at New Zealand International Review and as theme editor of Te Ara: The Encyclopedia of New Zealand.

== Career ==
McKinnon completed a PhD at Victoria University of Wellington in 1981, titled Impact of War: a Diplomatic History of New Zealand's Economic Relations With Britain, 1939-1954. He taught at Victoria University of Wellington 1975–1990 and has since worked independently as an historian. Since 2003 he has also been a writer and theme editor for Te Ara, the online encyclopedia of New Zealand, for which has overseen the regional entries.

His most well-known work is the New Zealand Historical Atlas (Auckland, David Bateman Ltd, 1997) for which he was the general editor, and which received the 1998 Montana Book Awards Reader's Choice Award.

McKinnon is also the author of an interpretive history of New Zealand's external relations Independence and Foreign Policy: New Zealand in the world since 1935 (Auckland, Auckland University Press, 1993); Immigrants and citizens: New Zealanders and Asian immigration in historical context (Wellington, Institute of Policy Studies VUW, 1996) and Treasury: the New Zealand Treasury 1840–2003 (Auckland, Auckland University Press, 2003).

Immigrants and citizens was described by sociologist David Pearson as "required reading for all those seeking to understand the historical context out of which current debates and tensions about so-called 'Asian' immigration have arisen.' http://www.bookcouncil.org.nz Treasury won the Archives and Records Association Ian Wards prize in 2004 for the best publication in New Zealand history in 2003. http://www.aranz.org.nz/

Since 2003 he has also been a writer and theme editor for Te Ara, the online encyclopedia of New Zealand, http://www.teara.govt.nz for which has overseen the regional entries.

McKinnon was president of the Professional Historians Association of New Zealand/Aotearoa from 2003 to 2007 and is a vice president of the New Zealand Institute of International Affairs. He is on the editorial committee of its journal, New Zealand International Review.

McKinnon was educated at Nelson College, Victoria University of Wellington, and Balliol College, Oxford and has held Harkness and Fulbright Scholarships at Harvard University and a Japan Foundation fellowship at Kyushu University, Fukuoka.

A new work Asian Cities: Globalization, Urbanization and Nation-Building was published by NIAS Press, http://www.nias.dk, in 2011.

== Notable students ==
Ann Beaglehole – New Zealand writer and historian

== Personal life and family ==
McKinnon is the younger brother of former Commonwealth Secretary-General Don McKinnon, Wellington Deputy Mayor Ian McKinnon and twin brother of New Zealand Defence Secretary John McKinnon. McKinnon's father was Chief of General Staff, Major General Walter McKinnon, CB, CBE. The McKinnon brothers are great-great-grandsons of John Plimmer, known as the father of Wellington.

== Bibliography ==
- Independence and Foreign Policy: New Zealand in the world since 1935, Auckland, Auckland University Press, 1993.
- Immigrants and citizens: New Zealanders and Asian immigration in historical context, Wellington, Institute of Policy Studies, Victoria University of Wellington, 1996.
- New Zealand historical atlas/Ko Papatuanuku e takoto nei, Auckland, David Bateman Ltd, 1997.
- Treasury: the New Zealand Treasury, 1840–2003, Auckland, Auckland University Press, 2003.
- Asian Cities: Globalization, urbanization and nation-building, Copenhagen, NIAS Press, 2011.
- New Zealand and ASEAN: a history, Wellington, Asia New Zealand Foundation, 2016.
- The Broken Decade: Prosperity, depression and recovery in New Zealand 1928-1939, Dunedin, Otago University Press, 2016.
