= Robert Dawson (general) =

New Zealand soldier (1916–1977

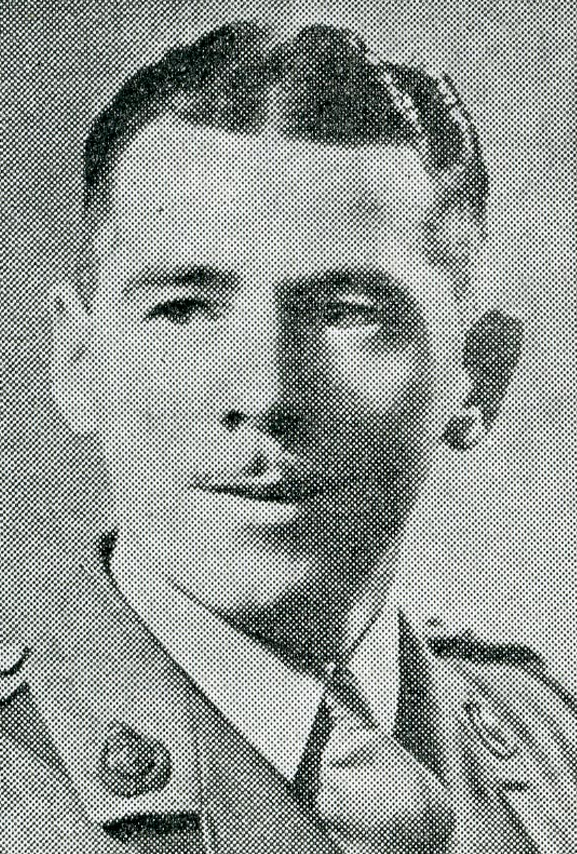
- Born: 21 July 1916; Rotorua, New Zealand
- Died: 24 July 1977 (aged 61); Lower Hutt, New Zealand
- Military career
- Allegiance: New Zealand
- Branch: New Zealand Army
- Service years: 1938–1970
- Rank: Major General
- Commands: Chief of the General Staff; Northern Military District; 28th British Commonwealth Brigade; No. 3 Battalion
- Conflicts: Second World War: Battle of Greece; Battle of Crete; North African campaign; Cold War: Malayan Emergency
- Awards: Companion of the Order of the Bath; Commander of the Order of the British Empire] Distinguished Service Order; Mention in Despatches (2)
- Other work: Director of Civil Defence

Major General Robert Dawson, CB CBE DSO (21 July 1916 – 24 July 1977) was a senior officer in the New Zealand Army. From Rotorua, Dawson joined the New Zealand Military Forces in 1938 and served in the Second World War with the 2nd New Zealand Division in Greece, Crete and North Africa. After the war he held a series of senior positions in the New Zealand Army, culminating with a term as Chief of the General Staff. Retiring from military service in 1970, he became Director of Civil Defence. He died in 1977, aged 61.

== Early life ==
Robert Boyd Dawson was born on 21 July 1916 in Rotorua, New Zealand. He went to Rotorua High School where he served in its cadet battalion. In February 1935, he was selected for a four-year course at the Australian Royal Military College in Duntroon, Australia. While a student at Duntroon, he played for an Australian Capital Territory representative rugby team against the touring All Blacks. Following his graduation from Duntroon in late 1938, he was commissioned as a lieutenant in the New Zealand Staff Corps. In 1939 he served as the adjutant of the Canterbury Yeomanry Cavalry in the Southern Military District.

== Second World War ==
Following the outbreak of the Second World War, Dawson was appointed the adjutant of the 23rd Battalion, raised for service as part of the 2nd New Zealand Division. At the time of embarkation from New Zealand in April 1940, he held the rank of captain. He went on to serve with the battalion during the Battle of Greece of April 1941. Evacuated to Crete at the end of the month, he was appointed the brigade major for the 5th Infantry Brigade, serving on the staff of Brigadier James Hargest.

Dawson assisted in the defence of Crete when the Germans invaded on 20 May, often liaising between Hargest and the battalion commanders of the 5th Infantry Brigade. He was later awarded the Distinguished Service Order for his actions on Crete. At the end of the year, he was mentioned in despatches, in recognition of his services in the Middle East.

In 1942 Dawson, promoted to major, went to the 6th Infantry Brigade, serving with it during the fighting in Egypt. He was later mentioned in despatches for a second time, for his services during the campaign in North Africa. Late the following year, he went to Australia, joining the teaching staff at Duntroon's Royal Military College. He remained in this post, teaching tactics, for the remainder of the war.

== Postwar service ==
Officers of 5th Infantry Brigade, 1941; Dawson stands on the left, next to Brigadier James Hargest

Dawson returned to New Zealand in 1946, and took up a post as the general staff officer for training at Army Headquarters in Wellington. In June 1947, and now a lieutenant colonel, he was sent to Japan to take command of 27th Battalion, serving there as part of the British Commonwealth Occupation Force. During his tenure as commander, it was re-designated the 3rd Battalion of the New Zealand Regiment. By 1948 he was back in New Zealand and subsequently became Director of Staff Duties at Army Headquarters and later took on the additional duty of command of a Territorial Force unit, the 3rd Battalion of the Wellington Regiment.

In 1953, Dawson was one of the New Zealand recipients of the Queen Elizabeth II Coronation Medal. The following year he was appointed Director of Plans and Intelligence at Army headquarters. In 1957, promoted to colonel, Dawson was appointed to the staff of the Southeast Asia Treaty Organisation, based in Bangkok for three years.

On his return to New Zealand in 1960, Dawson became quartermaster general of the New Zealand Army. He was posted to Malaya in 1962 to serve as the first New Zealand commander of the 28th British Commonwealth Infantry Brigade. At the time it was engaged in the Malayan Emergency, carrying out operations against communist insurgents. In the 1965 New Year Honours, Dawson was made a Commander of the Order of the British Empire. Later in the year he went to London for a course at the Imperial Defence College and on his return to New Zealand took command of the Northern Military District.

In April 1967, Dawson was promoted to major general and appointed Chief of the General Staff (CGS). He had been selected for the post the previous year, succeeding Major General Walter McKinnon. During his term as CGS, he oversaw an increased presence of New Zealand Army personnel engaged in the Vietnam War. In the 1969 Queen's Birthday Honours, he was appointed a Commander of the Order of the Bath.

== Later life ==
Dawson retired from the New Zealand Army in April 1970. Two months later he took up an appointment as the Director of Civil Defence. He died on 24 July 1977 at his home in Lower Hutt, aged 61. He was survived by his wife and two children.

Military offices
Preceded by Major General Walter McKinnon	Chief of the General Staff; 1967–1970	Succeeded by Major General Richard Webb
