= Ronald Hassett =

- Born: 27 May 1923; Wellington, New Zealand
- Died: 13 August 2004 (aged 81); Auckland, New Zealand
- Military career
- Allegiance: New Zealand
- Branch: New Zealand Army
- Service years: 1942–78
- Rank: Major General
- Commands: Chief of the General Staff
- Conflicts: Second World War; Italian campaign; Korean War; Malayan Emergency
- Awards: Companion of the Order of the Bath; Commander of the Order of the British Empire; Mentioned in Despatches

Major General Ronald Douglas Patrick Hassett, CB, CBE (27 May 1923 – 13 August 2004) was a senior officer in the New Zealand Army in the postwar period.

Born in Wellington, Hassett joined the New Zealand Military Forces in 1942 and served in the Second World War with an artillery unit of the 2nd New Zealand Division. After the war he held a series of staff and training positions in the military. During the Korean War he was second-in-command of the 16th Field Regiment. Afterwards, he continued to fulfill a series on increasingly important roles in the New Zealand Army. His professional career culminated with a term as Chief of the General Staff from 1976 to 1978. In this capacity, he was instrumental in the establishment of the Queen Elizabeth II Army Memorial Museum at Waiouru. In his retirement he continued to play a role in the leadership of the museum. He died in Auckland in August 2004, aged 81.

== Early life ==
Ronald Douglas Patrick Hassett was born in Wellington on 27 May 1923. He was educated at St Patrick's College, where he served in the cadets. His military career commenced in 1941, when he went to the Australian Army's Royal Military College at Duntroon as a cadet of the New Zealand Military Forces.

== Second World War ==
After completing his cadetship in 1942, which was shortened due to the war, Hasset was commissioned in the Royal New Zealand Artillery. It was not his first choice of branch of service; he had hoped to serve with the Royal New Zealand Engineers. After training in an anti-aircraft role, he was posted to the Middle East to serve with the 2nd New Zealand Expeditionary Force (2NZEF). After a period of time at Maadi Camp receiving further training, in April 1944 he was sent to the 5th Field Regiment, part of the 2nd New Zealand Division which at the time was fighting in Italy with the British Eighth Army.

Promoted to captain, Hassett was subsequently posted to the staff of the commander of the New Zealand divisional artillery, Brigadier Ray Queree. When the prospect of the formation of an air observation post unit was proposed in early 1945 for the 2nd New Zealand Division, Hassett was nominated to be its first commander. However, the end of the war meant that the unit was never formed.

== Postwar career ==
After the war, Hassett attended a senior staff college in the Middle East and then served at the rear headquarters of the 2NZEF at Caserta in Italy. He was subsequently sent to London where he served in a staff role before returning to New Zealand in 1947. After a period of flight instruction, where he was one of the first soldiers of the New Zealand Army to learn to fly, he was posted back to London, this time as the secretary of the New Zealand Joint Services Liaison Staff. After undertaking a gunnery staff course at the Royal School of Artillery at Larkhill, he returned to New Zealand to take up a position as chief instructor at the School of Artillery. The Korean War was in progress at the time and in due course he was sent to Korea as second-in-command of the 16th Field Regiment, the main component of Kayforce. He was mentioned in despatches for his six-month period of service in Korea, after which he resumed his instructing duties.

In 1955, Hassett was posted to Linton Military Camp, to serve as the brigade major of the divisional artillery followed by a role at the headquarters of the New Zealand Army in Wellington. He served with the 28th Commonwealth Infantry Brigade Group during the Malayan Emergency. Afterwards he attended the Australian Staff College. Promoted to lieutenant colonel, in 1962 he was made a Member of the Order of the British Empire. He returned to a staff role at the New Zealand Army headquarters in Wellington as Director Equipment. Appointed Deputy Quartermaster-General in 1966, he worked towards ensuring the supply and equipment of the New Zealand troops serving in the Vietnam War. In 1970 he served a year term as Deputy Chief of General Staff staff before undertaking another staff course, this time at the Royal College of Defence Studies. He was appointed Deputy Chief of Defence Staff in 1974 and the following year was made a Commander of the Order of the British Empire in the New Year Honours.

=== Chief of the General Staff ===
Hassett reached the pinnacle of his military career when he was appointed Chief of the General Staff in 1976. He oversaw the integration of the field and home defence command structures, introduced the title of Sergeant-Major of the Army, the senior non-commissioned officer position in the New Zealand Army, and introduced the lemon squeezer hat as ceremonial headwear. He was particularly instrumental in the establishment and construction of the Queen Elizabeth II Army Memorial Museum. Made a Companion of the Order of the Bath in the 1978 New Year Honours, he retired from the New Zealand Army in November 1978. Just prior to his retirement, the museum was officially opened.

== Later life ==
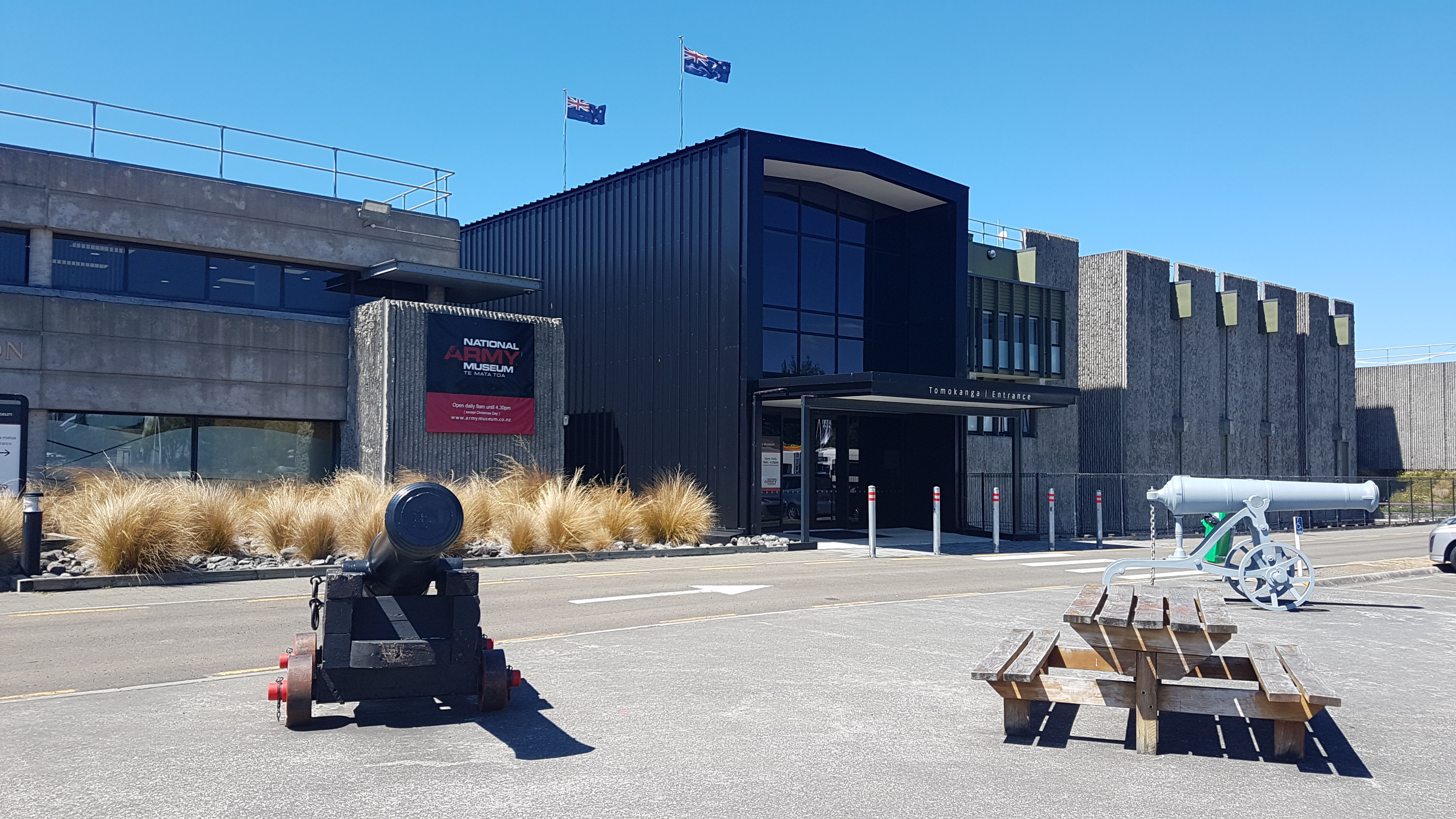
Hassett was instrumental in the establishment of the Army Memorial Museum, which was officially opened in late 1978 in Waiouru

In his retirement, Hassett established a venture promoting New Zealand businesses in Kuala Lumpur, Malaysia. In the 1980s, as the Labour Government revamped its defensive policy, he was among a number of former generals that were critical of its posture. In return, David Lange, the prime minister, described Hassett as one of New Zealand's "geriatric generals". He also remained heavily involved in the Army Memorial Museum, being president of its Executive Management Committee from 1992 to 1996, and overseeing its expansion through the construction of the Kippenberger Pavilion. He died in Auckland on 13 August 2004, survived by his wife and three children.

== Notes ==
Military offices
| Preceded by Major General Robin Holloway | Chief of the General Staff; 1976–1978 | Succeeded by Major General Brian Poananga |
