= Clare de Lore =

New Zealand journalist (born 1959)

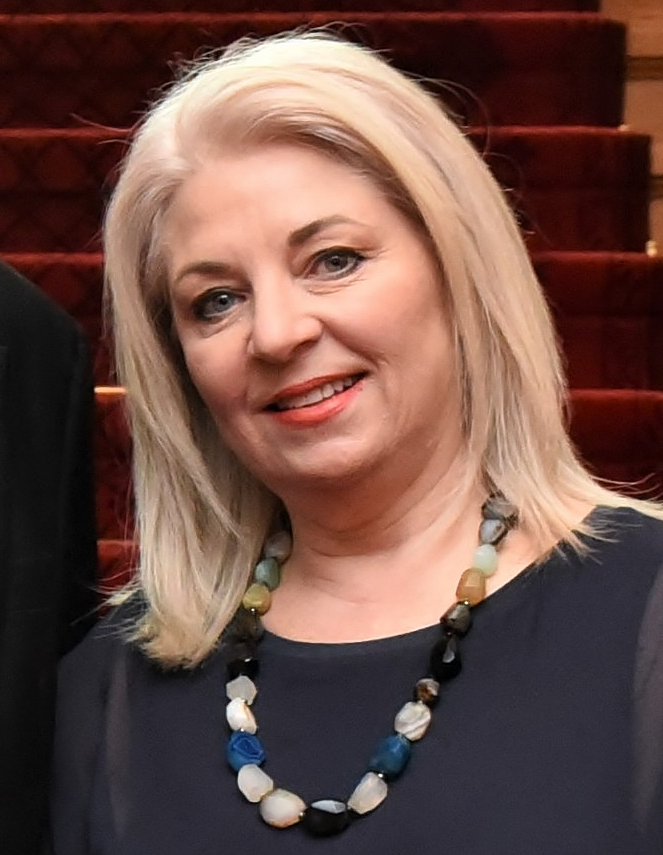
- De Lore in 2018

Personal details
- Born: Clare Frances de Lore; 7 November 1959 (age 67) Christchurch, New Zealand
- Spouse: Don McKinnon (m. 1995)
- Children: 1
- Occupation: Journalist

Clare Frances de Lore, Lady McKinnon (born 7 November 1959) is a New Zealand journalist.

De Lore was born in Christchurch on 7 November 1959, the daughter of Jim and Moya De Lore. She grew up in Riccarton in Christchurch, and attended St Teresa's School and Villa Maria College. After completing a journalism course, she worked at Radio New Zealand and in the State Services Commission. She is the author of Every Kitchen Tells a Story, a book of interviews of mainly women about their kitchens. From 2010, de Lore has been Rwanda's Honorary Consul General to New Zealand, and is an International Ambassador for Hope and Homes for Children, a charity working in 13 countries in eastern Europe and Africa.

De Lore married New Zealand politician Don McKinnon in 1995, and they have one son.

Honorary titles
Vacant Title last held by Peter Davis	Spouse of the Deputy Prime Minister of New Zealand; 1995–1996	Vacant Title next held by Diana Marie Creech
