= Walter McKinnon =

New Zealand general (1910–1998)

Walter Sneddon McKinnon
- Born: 8 July 1910; Invercargill, New Zealand
- Died: 20 May 1998 (aged 87); Wellington, New Zealand
- Relatives: Don McKinnon (son); Ian McKinnon (son); John McKinnon (son); Malcolm McKinnon (son)
- Military career
- Allegiance: New Zealand
- Branch: New Zealand Army
- Service years: 1935–67
- Rank: Major General
- Service number: 30015
- Commands: Chief of the General Staff; Southern Military District; Northern Military District
- Conflicts: Second World War; Solomon Islands campaign; Italian campaign
- Awards: Companion of the Order of the Bath; Commander of the Order of the British Empire; Mentioned in Despatches
- Other work: Chairman of New Zealand Broadcasting Corporation

Major General Walter Sneddon McKinnon, CB, CBE (8 July 1910 – 20 May 1998) was an officer in the New Zealand Army. He joined the military in 1935 and served in the Second World War with various artillery units of the Second New Zealand Expeditionary Force. After the war he held a series of senior positions in the army, culminating with a term as Chief of the General Staff from 1965 to 1967. In his retirement, he was Chairman of the New Zealand Broadcasting Corporation.

== Early life ==
McKinnon was born in Invercargill. He earned a degree in science from the University of Otago before joining the New Zealand Military Forces in 1935. He married Anna Plimmer in 1937, and the couple went on to have five children, four sons and one daughter.

== Second World War ==
When the Second World War broke out, McKinnon was in England on an artillery training course. He joined the Second New Zealand Expeditionary Force and served with the 3rd New Zealand Division during the campaign in the Solomon Islands. He was initially commander of the 28th Heavy Anti-Aircraft Regiment but when his unit was disbanded in July 1942 he took over 29th Light Anti-Aircraft Regiment. With his regiment, he landed on the Treasury and Green Islands. When the division was demobilised in 1944, he returned to England to attend the Staff College at Camberley. After completing his staff course, he joined the 2nd New Zealand Division, at the time fighting in Italy with the Eighth Army, along with other artillery officers who had served in the Pacific. Arriving in Italy in February 1945, he was second-in-command of firstly 4th Field Regiment and then 6th Field Regiment.

== Post-war career ==
After the war, McKinnon remained in Italy with a brigade group which was intended to serve in Japan with J Force, the New Zealand contribution to the occupation of Japan. J Force shipped out to Japan in November 1945, where he was the group's Chief Administrative Office.In the 1947 King's Birthday Honours he was appointed an Officer of the Order of the British Empire. He attended the Joint Staff College in the United Kingdom in 1948 and then commanded the Southern and Northern Military Districts. In 1953, McKinnon was awarded the Queen Elizabeth II Coronation Medal.

After a three-year period in Washington, D.C., as head of New Zealand's Joint Services Staff, McKinnon was appointed adjutant-general of the New Zealand Army in 1958. Three years later, in the 1961 Queen's Birthday Honours, he was made a Commander of the Order of the British Empire. The following year, he was made quartermaster-general and then in 1965, he was appointed Chief of the General Staff. In this role he persuaded the government to send an artillery battery to serve in the Vietnam War. He retired from the army in 1967 having been made a Companion of the Order of the Bath the previous year.

== Later life ==
In his retirement, McKinnon served as Chairman of the New Zealand Broadcasting Commission. He died in Wellington on 20 May 1998, and was survived by his four sons, all of whom had notable careers in their own right. Don was a politician who was served as Secretary-General of the Commonwealth of Nations from 2000 until 2008; John is a career diplomat and public servant; Malcolm is an historian; while Ian was deputy mayor of Wellington.

== Notes ==
Military offices
| Preceded by Major General Sir Leonard Thornton | Chief of the General Staff; 1965–1967 | Succeeded by Major General Robert Dawson |
