= Richard Webb (New Zealand Army officer) =

Sir Richard Webb
- Born: 21 December 1919; Nelson, New Zealand
- Died: 24 January 1990 (aged 70); Kawakawa, New Zealand
- Relatives: Selwyn Toogood (brother-in-law)
- Military career
- Allegiance: New Zealand
- Branch: New Zealand Army
- Service years: 1939–1976
- Rank: Lieutenant general
- Service number: 30099
- Commands: Chief of Defence Staff (1971–76); Chief of the General Staff (1970–71)
- Conflicts: Second World War; Korean War
- Awards: Knight Commander of the Order of the British Empire; Companion of the Order of the Bath; Mentioned in Despatches; Legion of Merit (United States)

Lieutenant General Sir Richard James Holden Webb, KBE, CB (21 December 1919 – 24 January 1990) was a senior commander in the New Zealand Army. He served as Chief of the General Staff, the professional head of the New Zealand Army, from 1970 to 1971, and held New Zealand's most senior military post, Chief of Defence Staff, from 1971 until his retirement in 1976.

== Early life and family ==
Born in Nelson, New Zealand, on 21 December 1919, Webb was the second child of George Robert Holden Webb and Jessie Muriel Webb (née Hair). He was educated at Nelson College from 1930 to 1937, where he was a prefect and a member of the 1st XV rugby team in his final year.

In 1950, Webb married Barbara Anne Griffin, and the couple went on to have two children. Webb had two sisters, including Cynthia who married broadcaster Selwyn Toogood.

== Military career ==
Webb entered the Royal Military College, Duntroon in Canberra, Australia, in 1939 as an officer cadet sponsored by the New Zealand government. On graduation, he was commissioned into the Regiment of New Zealand Artillery and served with the 6th Field Regiment, 2nd New Zealand Expeditionary Force during the Second World War.

Webb later served with the British Commonwealth Occupation Force in Japan and K Force in the Korean War, where he was Mentioned in Despatches and awarded the United States Legion of Merit. As a major, he was appointed a Member of the Order of the British Empire in the 1957 New Year Honours.

Webb succeeded Major General Robert Dawson as Chief of the General Staff (CGS), the professional head of the New Zealand Army, on 1 April 1970 and was appointed a Commander of the Order of the British Empire in the Queen's Birthday Honours two months later. The post lasted only eighteen months as Webb was selected as the next Chief of Defence Staff (CDS) in 1971. He handed over as CGS to Major General Leslie Pearce on 28 September and, promoted lieutenant general, succeeded Lieutenant General Sir Leonard Thornton as CDS. Webb was appointed a Companion of the Order of the Bath in the 1972 Queen's Birthday Honours, a Knight Commander of the Order of the British Empire in the 1974 New Year Honours, and retired from the New Zealand Army in 1976.

== Later life ==
Webb died in Kawakawa on 24 January 1990, aged 70. He was accorded a full military funeral at Wellington Cathedral of St Paul, and his ashes interred at St John the Baptist (Anglican) Churchyard in Waimate North.

Military offices
Preceded by Lieutenant General Sir Leonard Thornton	Chief of Defence Staff; 1971–1976	Succeeded by Air Marshal Sir Richard Bolt
Preceded by Major General Robert Dawson	Chief of the General Staff; 1970–1971	Succeeded by Major General Leslie Pearce
