= Les Pearce (general) =

Chief of Army in New Zealand (1918–2002)

Sir Leslie Pearce
- Born: 22 January 1918; Auckland, New Zealand
- Died: 21 December 2002 (aged 84); Auckland, New Zealand
- Military career
- Allegiance: New Zealand
- Branch: New Zealand Army
- Service years: 1937–1973
- Rank: Major General
- Commands: Chief of the General Staff (1971–73)
- Conflicts: Second World War; Vietnam War
- Awards: Commander of the Order of the British Empire; Companion of the Order of the Bath

Major General Leslie Arthur Pearce CB CBE (22 January 1918 – 21 December 2002) was a senior commander in the New Zealand Army. He served as Chief of the General Staff, the professional head of the New Zealand Army, from 1971 to 1973, when he retired. He was the first soldier in the New Zealand Army who rose from private to Chief of Army.

== Early life ==
Pearce was born on 22 January 1918 in the Auckland suburb of Herne Bay. His parents were Bessie (née Crespin; 1879–1940) and Frank Pearce (1874–1956). Both from Bristol in England, his parent had married on 4 August 1904 at the Wesleyan Church in New Plymouth.

On 3 July 1944, Pearce married Fay Mattocks of Balmoral at St Barnabas' Church in Mount Eden. They were to have two sons and one daughter.

== Army career ==
Pearce joined the army in 1937 as a private. He served in the Second World War, leaving in 1940. He was with the infantry in Egypt, Italy, and North Africa. By the final year of the war, he was a major and commander of the 26th Battalion. After the war he remaining in the military, performing instructing duties.

Pearce was in Malaya as a lieutenant colonel from 1960 to 1964 following the Malayan Emergency, during which time he was commander of the 1st Infantry Battalion, Royal New Zealand Infantry Regiment. He also served in the Vietnam War as a brigadier. In 1967, Pearce attended the Imperial Defence College in London. He was promoted to Chief of the General Staff in 1971 and held the post for two years, after which he retired. He was the first soldier in the New Zealand Army who rose from private to Chief of Army.

== Rugby union ==
In his youth, Pearce played rugby union as a flanker. He was elected president of the Auckland Rugby Union in 1975 and held that role until 1977. Afterwards, he was the chairman of a select committee of the New Zealand Rugby Union. He was vice patron of North Harbour Rugby Union from 1985 to 1988, and became the club's patron in 1988. He held that role until his death. In 2004, the club introduced the "Major-General Les Pearce Memorial Shield", which is the Premier 1 grade challenge shield.

== Honours and commemoration ==
In the 1956 New Year Honours, Pearce was appointed Member of the Order of the British Empire in the military division. In the 1964 New Year Honours, he was promoted to Officer of the same order. In the 1972 New Year Honours, he was promoted to Commander of the same order. In the 1973 Birthday Honours, he was appointed Companion of the Order of the Bath.

== Death ==
Pearce died in Auckland on 21 December 2002. His funeral was held at St Peter's Anglican Church in Takapuna.

In 2021, a former soldier who used to serve under Pearce saw his military memorabilia put up for auction. He informed staff at the National Army Museum in Waiouru about the auction and they purchased the items for their collection.

Military offices
| Preceded by Major General Richard Webb | Chief of the General Staff; 1971–1973 | Succeeded by Major General Robin Holloway |
