= Esmond Gibson =

New Zealand civil engineer and aviation administrator

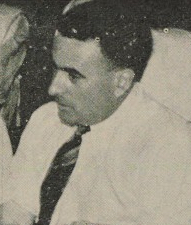
Gibson in 1937

Esmond Allen Gibson CBE (7 August 1896–17 March 1981) was a New Zealand civil engineer and aviation administrator. He was born in Wellington, New Zealand, on 7 August 1896.

Always known as ‘Gibby’, he obtained his commercial pilots licence in 1934 and joined the New Zealand Territorial Air Force in 1937 and commanded 2 Squadron until he transferred to the Director of Works, HQ, of the Royal New Zealand Air Force (RNZAF) from 4 September 1939 attaining the rank of wing commander. He was responsible for the development of airfields in New Zealand and a number of Pacific Islands. On his retirement from the RNZAF in 1947, he was appointed the first Director of Civil of Aviation in New Zealand and, among other things, actively supported the development of aerial topdressing in New Zealand until he retired in 1957.

In the 1943 New Year Honours, Gibson was appointed an additional Officer of the Order of the British Empire (Military Division). In 1953, he was awarded the Queen Elizabeth II Coronation Medal. In the 1978 New Year Honours, he was promoted to Commander of the Order of the British Empire, for services to civil aviation.

The EA Gibson Award was established in his memory by the New Zealand division of the Royal Aeronautical Society to acknowledge substantial technical achievement in the field of agricultural aviation.
