= Rob Williams (New Zealand general) =

New Zealand army general (1930–2023)

Major General Rob Williams CB MBE OStJ
- Born: Robin Guy Williams; 14 August 1930; Wellington, New Zealand
- Died: 4 February 2023 (aged 92)
- Spouse: Jill Rollo Tyrie (m. 1953)
- Children: 3
- Relatives: George Williams (grandfather)
- Military career
- Allegiance: New Zealand
- Branch: New Zealand Army
- Rank: Major General
- Commands: 1 RNZIR; Chief of the General Staff
- Conflicts: Malayan Emergency; Vietnam War

Major General Robin Guy Williams CB MBE OStJ (14 August 1930 – 4 February 2023) was a New Zealand military leader. He served as Chief of the General Staff from 1981 to 1984.

== Early life and family ==
Born in Wellington on 14 August 1930, Williams was the son of John Upham Williams and Margaret Joan Williams (née Mayfield). Both of his parents were medical doctors. Williams was educated at Nelson College from 1943 to 1948.

In 1953, Williams married Jill Rollo Tyrie, and the couple went on to have three children.

== Military career ==
Williams joined the New Zealand Army in 1948, and attended the Royal Military College, Duntroon, from 1949 to 1952. He later studied at the Royal Military College of Science in 1962, the Staff College, Camberley, in 1963, the Joint Services Staff College in Canberra in 1972, and the Royal College of Defence Studies in 1976. He served overseas during the Malayan Emergency and the Vietnam War.

Between 1977 and 1979, Williams served as Commander Field Force. He was Assistant Chief of Defence Staff (Operations / Plans) from 1979 to 1980, and Deputy Chief of the General Staff in 1981. In late 1981, he succeeded Brian Poananga as Chief of the General Staff, serving in that role until December 1984, when he retired from the army.

== Post-army career ==
After leaving the army, Williams was the deputy chair of Operation Raleigh New Zealand from 1985 to 1986, and then chair of that organisation from 1986 to 1989. He was the chief executive of St John New Zealand from 1986 to 1987, chief executive of the Auckland division of the Cancer Society of New Zealand from 1987 to 1993, and then chief executive of St John in the Auckland region.

Williams died on 4 February 2023. His wife, Jill, died in 2025.

== Rugby union ==
Williams represented the Royal Military College, Duntroon, at rugby union from 1949 to 1952. He played for the Australian Capital Territory in 1951 and 1952, and New South Wales Country in 1952. He was a member of the New Zealand Army and New Zealand Combined Services teams between 1953 and 1956.

== Honours and awards ==
In the 1969 New Year Honours, Williams was appointed a Member of the Order of the British Empire (Military Division). He was awarded the Queen Elizabeth II Silver Jubilee Medal in 1977, and made a Companion of the Order of the Bath (Military Division) in the 1983 New Year Honours. In 1987, Williams was appointed an Officer of the Order of St John.

Military offices
Preceded by Major General Brian Poananga	Chief of the General Staff; 1981–1984	Succeeded by Major General John Mace
