= Brian Poananga =

New Zealand military leader (1924–1995)

- Born: 2 December 1924; Palmerston North, New Zealand
- Died: 5 September 1995 (aged 70); Taupō, New Zealand
- Military career
- Allegiance: New Zealand
- Branch: New Zealand Army
- Service years: 1944–81
- Rank: Major General
- Commands: Chief of the General Staff; 1st Battalion, Royal New Zealand Infantry Regiment
- Conflicts: Second World War; Occupation of Japan; Korean War; Malayan Emergency; Indonesia–Malaysia confrontation
- Awards: Companion of the Order of the Bath; Commander of the Order of the British Empire; Mentioned in Despatches (2)

Major General Brian Matauru Poananga, CB, CBE (2 December 1924 – 5 September 1995) was a New Zealand sportsman, military leader and diplomat. Of Māori descent, he identified with the Ngāti Porou and Rangitāne iwi. He was born in Palmerston North, Manawatu, in 1924. He was educated at Palmerston North Boys' High School.

In the 1962 Queen's Birthday Honours, Poananga was appointed a Member of the Order of the British Empire (Military Division). He was promoted to Officer of the Order of the British Empire in the 1968 Queen's Birthday Honours, and further promoted to Commander of the same Order in the 1978 New Year Honours. In the 1980 Queen's Birthday Honours, he was appointed a Companion of the Order of the Bath.

Military offices
| Preceded by Major General Ronald Hassett | Chief of the General Staff; 1978–1981 | Succeeded by Major General Rob Williams |
