= John McKinnon (diplomat) =

New Zealand diplomat and public servant

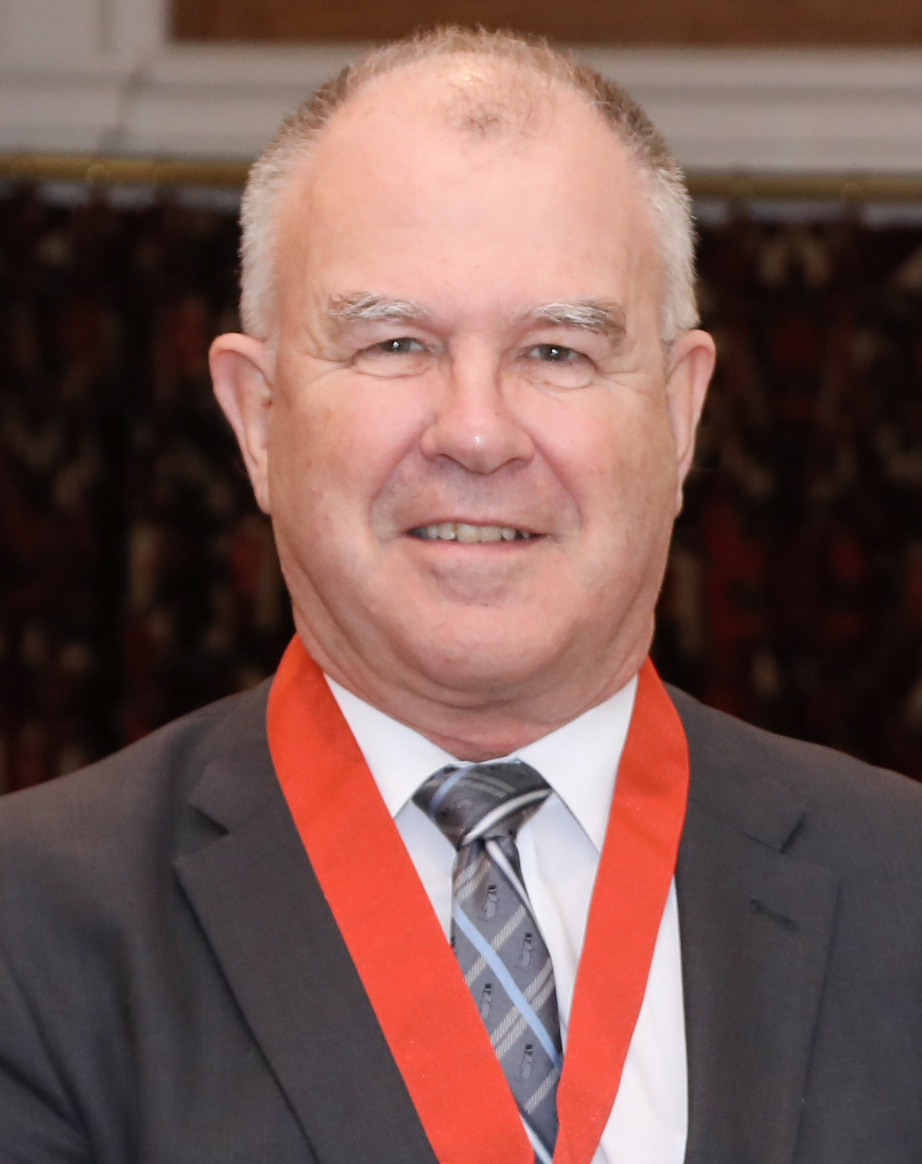
McKinnon in 2020

John Walter McKinnon CNZM QSO (born 1950) is a New Zealand diplomat and public servant.

== Early life ==
McKinnon was educated at Nelson College from 1963 to 1967, Victoria University of Wellington, and the London School of Economics. He is the younger brother of former New Zealand Deputy Prime Minister, Foreign Minister, and, former Commonwealth Secretary-General Don McKinnon; and of Ian McKinnon, Chancellor of Victoria University of Wellington and a former Deputy Mayor of Wellington City; twin brother of historian and New Zealand international relations expert Malcolm McKinnon; and the son of Major-General Walter McKinnon, former Chief of General Staff and Chairman of New Zealand Broadcasting.

== Career ==
McKinnon joined the New Zealand Ministry of Foreign Affairs in 1974, and was posted to Beijing as second secretary in 1978. In 1985, he was posted to Washington as First Secretary, then to Canberra as Counsellor in 1986.

In 1992, McKinnon became New Zealand’s Deputy Permanent Representative to the United Nations in New York and was the only senior New Zealand diplomat to preside over the entirety of New Zealand's third tenure on the United Nations Security Council (1993–1994). On returning to Wellington in 1995 he became Director of the External Assessments Bureau. In 2001, McKinnon became New Zealand’s Ambassador to Beijing.

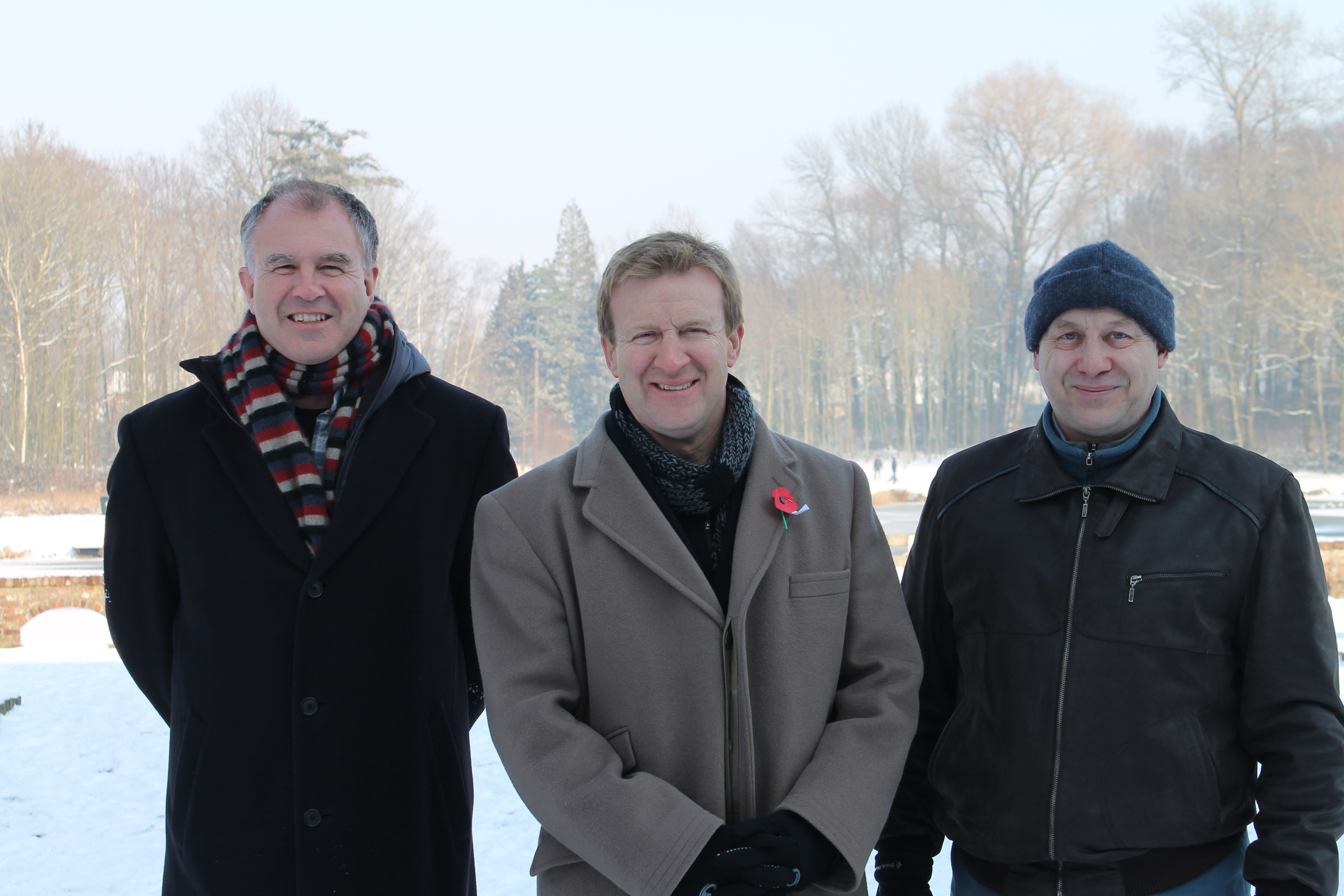
McKinnon (left) with Defence Minister Jonathon Coleman (centre), and Chief of Defence Force Lt General Rhys Jones, outside Memorial Museum Passchendaele 1917, Belgium, February 2012

McKinnon was Deputy Secretary of Foreign Affairs from 2004, responsible for international politics and security (Programme One). Coupled with his previous role running one of New Zealand's intelligence agencies, he is considered an expert in international security. In October 2006, the Government announced that he would succeed Graham Fortune as the Chief Executive of the Ministry of Defence, a position he held from the end of 2006 to November 2012.

In the 2013 Queen's Birthday Honours, McKinnon was appointed a Companion of the Queen's Service Order for services to the State.

From December 2012 to October 2014, McKinnon served as the Executive Director of the Asia New Zealand Foundation.

In January 2015, McKinnon returned to Beijing for a second posting as Ambassador where he is served until 2017 at which point in time he retired

In the 2020 New Year Honours, he was appointed a Companion of the New Zealand Order of Merit, for services to New Zealand–China relations.

== Personal life ==
McKinnon is married to art historian and writer Avenal McKinnon.
