= John Mace (New Zealand Army officer) =

Senior commander of the New Zealand Army (1932–2026)

Lieutenant General Sir John Mace KBE CB
- Born: John Airth Mace; 29 June 1932; Ashburton, New Zealand
- Died: 22 September 2026 (aged 94); Auckland, New Zealand
- Military career
- Allegiance: New Zealand
- Branch: New Zealand Army
- Service years: 1950–1991
- Commands: Chief of Defence Staff (1987–1991); Chief of the General Staff (1984–1987); New Zealand Force South East Asia (1979–1980); 1st Battalion, Royal New Zealand Infantry Regiment (1971–1973); New Zealand Special Air Service Squadron (1960–1962, 1965)
- Conflicts: Malayan Emergency; Indonesia–Malaysia confrontation Vietnam War
- Awards: Mentioned in Despatches

Lieutenant General Sir John Airth Mace KBE CB (29 June 1932 – 22 September 2026) was a senior commander of the New Zealand Army. He served as Chief of the General Staff, the professional head of the New Zealand Army, from 1984 to 1987, and then as Chief of Defence Staff from 1987 until his retirement in 1991.

== Military career ==
John Airth Mace was born in Ashburton, New Zealand on 29 June 1932. He received his secondary school education at Ashburton High School and Nelson College. He entered the Royal Military College, Duntroon in Canberra, Australia, in 1950 as an officer cadet sponsored by the New Zealand government. He was attached to a National Service battalion for two weeks of training in his final year at the college and, on graduation, was commissioned into the Royal New Zealand Infantry Regiment in December 1953.

Mace served with the New Zealand Special Air Service Squadron in the Malayan Emergency from 1955 to 1957, for which he was Mentioned in Despatches. He later commanded the Squadron from 1960 to 1962 and again in 1965, after he had graduated from the Staff College, Camberley in the United Kingdom. In 1966, he deployed to Borneo during the Indonesia–Malaysia confrontation as a company commander in the 1st Battalion, Royal New Zealand Infantry Regiment (1RNZIR). Mace subsequently led the battalion's V Company during its deployment to Vietnam in 1967. He was appointed a Member of the Order of the British Empire in 1968 in recognition of his "distinguished service in Vietnam".

He was Director of Infantry and SAS from 1969 to 1970, commanding officer of 1RNZIR in Singapore from 1971 to 1973, was appointed an Officer of the Order of the British Empire in the 1974 New Year Honours, and attended the Australian Joint Services Staff College in Canberra, also in 1974. He served as Commander, New Zealand Force South East Asia in Singapore from 1979 to 1980, graduated from the Royal College of Defence Studies in London in 1981, and was appointed Deputy Chief of Defence Staff from 1981 to 1984.

Mace succeeded Major General Rob Williams as Chief of the General Staff (CGS), the professional head of the New Zealand Army, on 12 December 1984. He was appointed a Companion of the Order of the Bath in the 1986 New Year Honours and, having served as CGS for three years, was selected as the next Chief of Defence Staff (CDS) in 1987. He handed over as CGS to Major General Don McIver on 30 November and, promoted lieutenant general, succeeded Air Marshal David Crooks as CDS. Mace retired from the New Zealand Army in 1991, having been appointed a Knight Commander of the Order of the British Empire in the 1990 Queen's Birthday Honours.

Mace died in Auckland on 22 September 2026, at the age of 94.

Military offices
Preceded by Air Marshal David Crooks	Chief of Defence Staff; 1987–1991	Succeeded by Vice Admiral Sir Somerford Teagle
Preceded by Major General Rob Williams	Chief of the General Staff; 1984–1987	Succeeded by Major General Don McIver
