= Chief of Army (New Zealand) =

Effective commander of the New Zealand Army

- Incumbent; Rose King since 27 August 2024
- New Zealand Army
- Style: Major General
- Abbreviation: CA
- Member of: New Zealand Defence Force
- Reports to: Chief of Defence Force
- Term length: Three years, renewable
- Formation: 7 December 1910
- First holder: Maj Gen Sir Alexander Godley

Chief of Army (CA) is the effective commander of the New Zealand Army, responsible to the Chief of Defence Force (CDF) for raising, training and sustaining those forces necessary to meet agreed government outputs. The CA acts as principal advisor to the CDF on Army matters, though for operations the Army's combat units fall under the command of the Land Component Commander, Joint Forces New Zealand. The rank associated with the position is major general, and CAs are generally appointed on a three-year term.

The position was originally formed as Commandant and General Officer Commanding the New Zealand Military Forces in 1910, changing to Chief of the General Staff in 1937 and, finally, CA in 2002. Major General Rose King, the current CA, has been in the post since 27 August 2024. King is the first woman to serve in the role.

== Appointees ==
The below indicated * (asterisk) indicates that the individual was subsequently promoted to lieutenant general and appointed Chief of Defence Force.

The following list chronologically records those who have held the post of Chief of Army or its preceding positions, with rank and honours as at the completion of the individual's term.

No.	Portrait	Name	Term of office			Ref.
No.	Portrait	Name	Took office	Left office	Time in office	Ref.
Commandant and General Officer Commanding the New Zealand Military Forces
1		Major General; Sir Alexander Godley; KCMG	7 December 1910	10 September 1914	3 years, 277 days	
2		Major General; Sir Alfred Robin; KCMG CB	11 September 1914	9 December 1919	5 years, 89 days	
3		Major General; Sir Edward Chaytor; KCMG KCVO CB	10 December 1919	30 April 1924	4 years, 142 days	
4		Major General; Charles Melvill; CB CMG DSO	1 May 1924	6 December 1925	1 year, 219 days	
5		Major General; Robert Young; CB CMG DSO	7 December 1925	31 March 1931	5 years, 114 days	
6		Major General; Sir William Sinclair-Burgess; KBE CB CMG DSO	1 April 1931	31 March 1937	5 years, 364 days	
Chief of the General Staff
1		Major General; Sir John Duigan; KBE CB DSO	1 April 1937	31 May 1941	4 years, 60 days	
2		Lieutenant General; Sir Edward Puttick; KCB DSO & Bar	1 August 1941	31 December 1945	4 years, 152 days	
3		Major General; Sir Norman Weir; KBE CB	1 January 1946	31 March 1949	3 years, 89 days	
4		Major General; Keith Stewart; CB DSO OBE	1 April 1949	31 March 1952	2 years, 365 days	
5		Major General; William Gentry; CB CBE DSO & Bar	1 April 1952	14 August 1955	3 years, 135 days	
6		Major General; Stephen Weir; CB DSO & Bar	15 August 1955	30 August 1960	5 years, 15 days	
7		Major General; Leonard Thornton*; CB CBE	1 September 1960	31 March 1965	4 years, 211 days	
8		Major General; Walter McKinnon; CB CBE	1 April 1965	31 March 1967	1 year, 364 days	
9		Major General; Robert Dawson; CB CBE DSO	1 April 1967	31 March 1970	2 years, 364 days	
10		Major General; Richard Webb*; CBE	1 April 1970	28 September 1971	1 year, 180 days	
11		Major General; Les Pearce; CB CBE	29 September 1971	30 September 1973	2 years, 1 day	
12		Major General; Robin Holloway; CB CBE	1 October 1973	14 November 1976	3 years, 44 days	
13		Major General; Ronald Hassett; CB CBE	15 November 1976	15 November 1978	2 years, 0 days	
14		Major General; Brian Poananga; CB CBE	16 November 1978	15 November 1981	2 years, 364 days	
15		Major General; Rob Williams; CB MBE	16 November 1981	11 December 1984	3 years, 25 days	
16		Major General; John Mace*; CB OBE	12 December 1984	30 November 1987	2 years, 353 days	
17		Major General; Don McIver; OBE	1 December 1987	28 February 1989	1 year, 89 days	
18		Major General; Bruce Meldrum; CB OBE	1 March 1989	29 February 1992	2 years, 365 days	
19		Major General; Anthony Birks; CB OBE	1 March 1992	24 February 1995	2 years, 360 days	
20		Major General; Piers Reid; CBE	25 February 1995	25 February 1998	3 years, 0 days	
21		Major General; Maurice Dodson; CBE MC	26 February 1998	February 2002	4 years	
22		Major General; Jerry Mateparae; ONZM	February 2002	30 April 2002	2 months	
Chief of Army
1		Major General; Jerry Mateparae*; ONZM	1 May 2002	30 April 2006	3 years, 364 days	
2		Major General; Lou Gardiner; ONZM	1 May 2006	30 April 2009	2 years, 364 days	
3		Major General; Rhys Jones*	1 May 2009	23 January 2011	1 year, 267 days	
4		Major General; Tim Keating*; MNZM	February 2011	December 2012	1 year, 10 months	
5		Major General; Dave Gawn; MBE	25 February 2013	9 September 2015	2 years, 196 days	
6		Major General; Peter Kelly; MNZM	10 September 2015	31 August 2018	2 years, 355 days	
7		Major General; John Boswell; DSD	1 September 2018	26 August 2024	5 years, 360 days	
8		Major General; Rose King	27 August 2024	Incumbent	2 years, 57 days	
