= 1981 New Zealand Royal Visit Honours =

1981 Royal Visit Honours
- Previous: 1981 Queen's Birthday Honours; Next: 1981 bravery awards
- Type: New Zealand royal honours: Royal Victorian Order
- Date: 15–20 October 1981
- Country: New Zealand
- Total recipients: 8

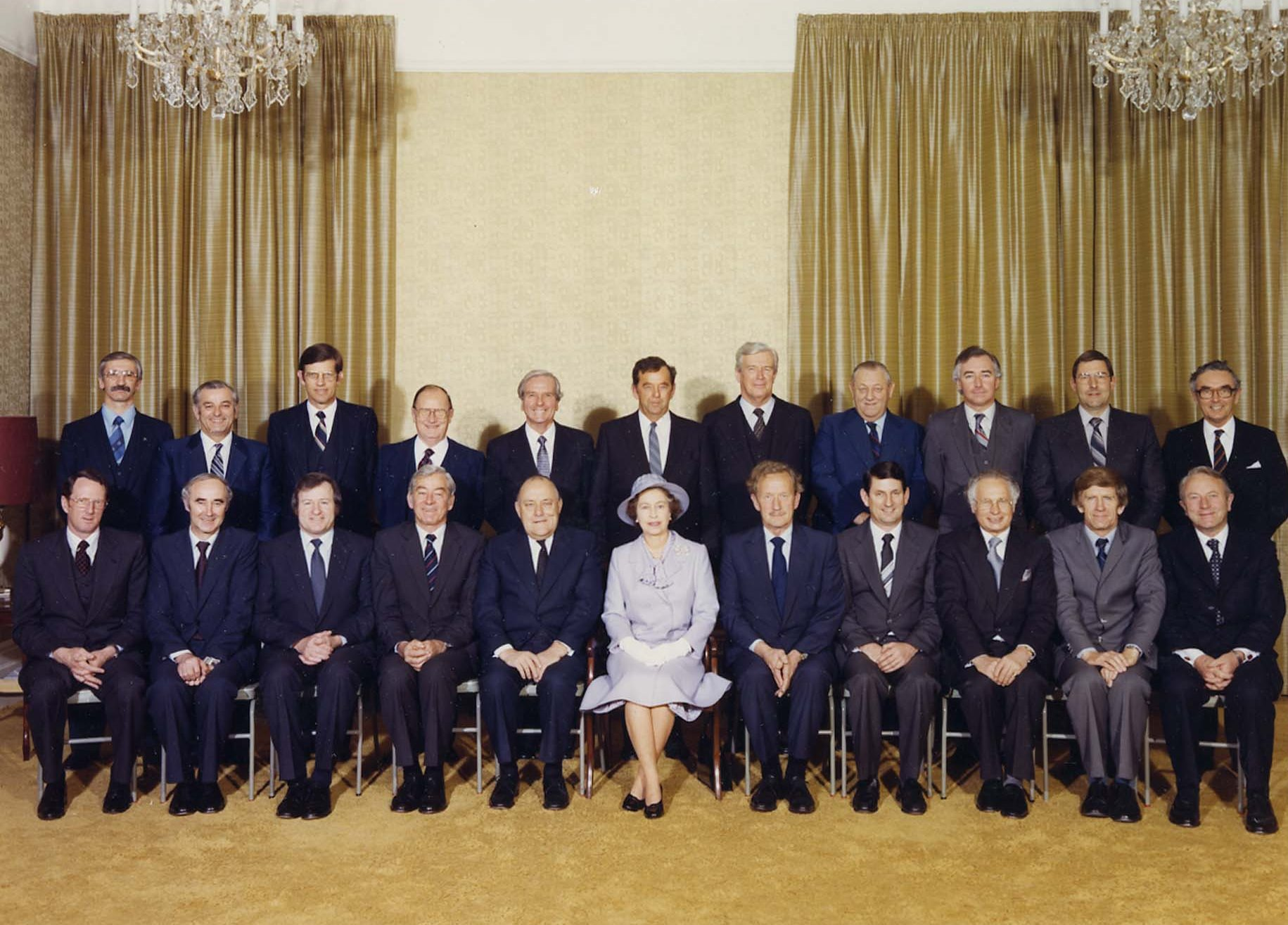
The Queen with the Cabinet during her visit to New Zealand in 1981

The 1981 New Zealand Royal Visit Honours were appointments by Elizabeth II to the Royal Victorian Order, to mark her visit to New Zealand in October that year. The honours were announced between 15 October and 20 October 1981.

The recipients of honours are listed here as they were styled before their new honour.

== Royal Victorian Order ==
=== Knight Grand Cross (GCVO) ===
- Sir David Stuart Beattie GCMG – governor-general of New Zealand
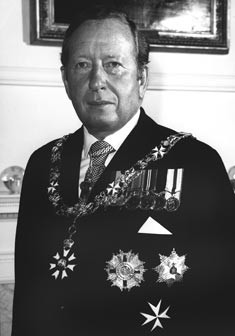
Sir David Beattie

=== Member, fourth class (MVO) ===
- Lieutenant Colonel Frederick Betton Bath MBE – of Wellington
- Richard Butler MVO – of Tawa
- Superintendent Ian Lindsay Mills – New Zealand Police; of Lower Hutt

In 1984, Members of the Royal Victorian Order, fourth class, were redesignated as Lieutenants of the Royal Victorian Order (LVO).

=== Member, fifth class (MVO) ===
- Flight Lieutenant John Henry Staples Hamilton – Royal New Zealand Air Force; of Wigram
- Raymond George Hawthorn RVM – of Wellington
- Genevieve Margaret Jordan – of Wellington

== Royal Victorian Medal ==
=== Silver (RVM) ===
- Robert Hotson Francis Sisson-Stretch – of Wellington
