= 1977 New Year Honours (New Zealand) =

Award

The 1977 New Year Honours in New Zealand were appointments by Elizabeth II on the advice of the New Zealand government to various orders and honours to reward and highlight good works by New Zealanders. The awards celebrated the passing of 1976 and the beginning of 1977, and were announced on 31 December 1976.

The recipients of honours are displayed here as they were styled before their new honour.

== Knight Bachelor ==
- The Honourable Mr Justice Robin Brunskill Cooke – judge of the Court of Appeal.
- Victor Caddy Davies OBE JP – of New Plymouth. For services to horticulture.
- David Norman Perry MBE – of Ōpōtiki. For services to the community and Māori people.

== Order of the Bath ==
=== Companion (CB) ===
Civil division

- Henry George Lang – of Wellington; Secretary to the Treasury since 1969.

Military division

- Air Marshal Richard Bruce Bolt CBE DFC AFC – Chief of Air Staff.

== Order of Saint Michael and Saint George ==
=== Knight Commander (KCMG) ===
- The Honourable John Kenneth McAlpine CMG – of Christchurch. For public services, especially as chairman of the New Zealand Ports Authority since 1969.
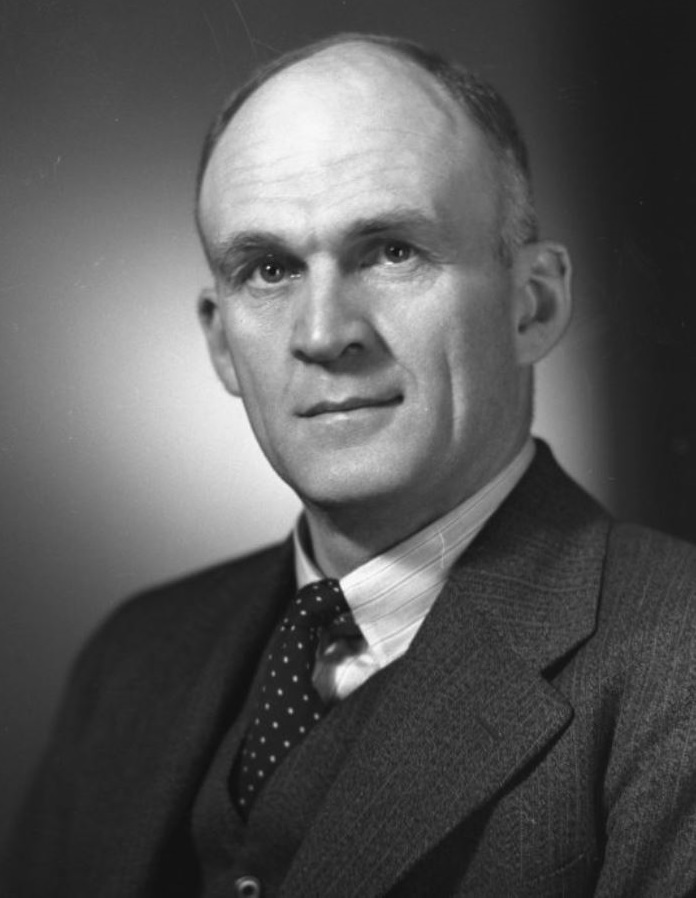
Sir John McAlpine

=== Companion (CMG) ===
- James Samson Campbell – of Wellington. For services to the fishing industry as general manager of the Fishing Industry Board, 1962–75.
- Hugh Alexander Fullarton – of Wellington; chairman of the Local Government Commission since 1967.
- Dorothy Gertrude Winstone – of Auckland. For public services.

== Order of the British Empire ==
=== Knight Commander (KBE) ===
Civil division

- Charles Alexander Fleming OBE FRS – of Wellington. For services to science and conservation.

=== Commander (CBE) ===
Civil division

- Cecil Lancelot Stewart Cross OBE – of Wellington. For services to sport as a member of the International Olympic Committee and chairman of the New Zealand Olympic and Commonwealth Games Association.
- Keith Wilson Hay OBE – of Auckland. For services to local government and the community.
- William Terance Howie (The Reverend Brother Urban) – of Tuakau. For services to education.
- Beryl Dorrien Ibbotson – of Dunedin. For services to the community.
- Hugh Drummond Lambie OBE JP – of Auckland. For services to local-body and community affairs.
- John Henry Rutherford – of Kiwitea. For services to the Royal Agricultural Society of New Zealand.
- Lionel Ralph Sceats – director-general, New Zealand Broadcasting Corporation, 1970–75.
- Thomas Michael Small – general manager, New Zealand Railways, 1972–76.

Military division

- Commodore Neil Dudley Anderson OBE ADC – deputy Chief of Defence Staff.

=== Officer (OBE) ===
Civil division

- The Reverend Canon Walter Charles Arnold. For services as Wellington City Missioner since 1964.
- Donald Maurice Geddes Beasley – of Whangārei. For services to the New Zealand Society for the Intellectually Handicapped.
- Vivian Percy Blakeley – of Raumati South. For services as general secretary and chairman of New Zealand Port Employers' Association.
- Henry John Knighton Farey – of Wellington. For services to the surf life saving movement.
- Arthur Oswald Michael Gilmour – of Auckland. For services to medicine.
- John Waddell Hayward – registrar of the University of Otago, 1948–75.
- Norman Bannerman Holland – of Auckland. For services to horseracing.
- Edward Durning Holt JP – of Hawke's Bay. For services to agriculture and the community.
- Gordon Hezlam Jolly – of Dunedin. For services to bowling.
- Henry Arthur Selwyn Lloyd JP – of Kaukapakapa. For services to farming and the community.
- Donald Conroy McIntyre – of Orpington, Kent, England. For services to opera.
- Elizabeth Jean McLean – of Dunedin. For services to the community.
- Thomas Christopher Maling – of North Canterbury. For services to the treatment and rehabilitation of alcoholics.
- Eruera Riini Manuera MBE JP – of Whakatāne. For services to the Māori people.
- The Honourable John Rae – of Auckland. For public services.
- Clifford Trillo – of Auckland. For service to the community.
- The Reverend David Owen Williams – of Auckland. For services to the New Zealand Methodist Church and community.

Military division

- Commander Ian Scott Monro – Royal New Zealand Navy.
- Colonel Ronald Rochfort Harding – Colonels' List, Royal New Zealand Army.
- Group Captain Ian Murray Gillard AFC – Royal New Zealand Air Force.
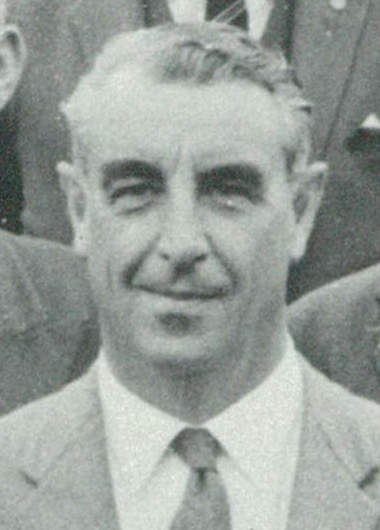
Ned Holt

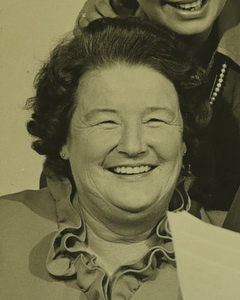
Jean McLean

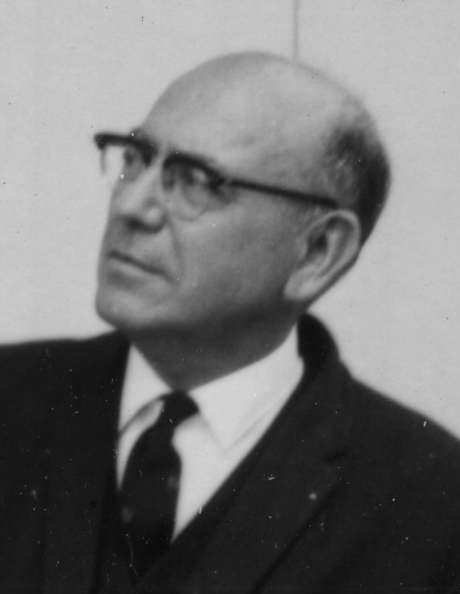
John Rae

=== Member (MBE) ===
Civil division

- Edmund Peter Allen – of New Plymouth. For services to medicine and the community.
- Sydney Charles Ashton – of Timaru. For services to sport, especially boxing.
- Albert Noel Boag – of Papatoetoe. For services to the blind.
- Sidney St David Edwards – of Wellington; lately principal engineering officer, Broadcasting Council of New Zealand.
- Nancy Margaret Fleming – of Eastbourne. For services to badminton.
- Archibald Walter Gibb – of Oamaru. For services to the New Zealand Automobile Association.
- John Ross Gillespie – of Christchurch. For services to hockey.
- Sidney Milton Going – of North Auckland. For services to rugby.
- William Hawthorn JP – of Whangārei. For services to the community.
- Francis Henry Holz – of Pukekohe. For services to sport and the community.
- Gladys Margaret Hope – of Taupō. For services to the community, especially the New Zealand Red Cross Society.
- Bernard William Joseph Hoult – of Wellington, lately assistant secretary (finance), Ministry of Defence.
- Sybil Alexandra Jackson – of Wanganui. For services to women's affairs and community.
- Royden Hugh Johnston – of Pukerua Bay. For services to the community.
- Stuart Gwyn Jones – of Hastings. For services to golf.
- Captain Philip Francis Alexander William Herbert Le Couteur – of Auckland; lately chief pilot, Air New Zealand.
- Desmond Patrick Lynskey – of Blenheim. For services to the aviation industry.
- Hazel Maude Ellen McLeod – of Gisborne. For services to netball, the life saving movement and community.
- Cecilia Evelyn Manson – of Eastbourne. For services to literature.
- Margaret Kahurangi Matangi – of Auckland. For services to the education and training of mentally handicapped children.
- Frank Mogridge JP – of Blenheim. For services to the community.
- James Leslie Herbert Savage – of Kawerau. For services to paraplegics and sport.
- William Burns Souter – of Auckland. For services to local-body affairs.
- Eruera Kawhia Whakatane Stirling – of Auckland. For services to Māori affairs.
- William Laird Thomson JP – of Piha. For services to the arts.
- Anita Charlotte Webster – of Auckland. For services to the performing arts.
- Norma Mary Williams – of Auckland. For services to swimming.
- Benjamin Robert Alty – chief superintendent, New Zealand Police.

Military division

- Lieutenant Commander Richard Donald McBurney – Royal New Zealand Navy.
- Warrant Officer Class Two John Hamilton Baird – Royal New Zealand Infantry Regiment (Territorial Force).
- Chaplain Class III Francis Raymond Scott – Royal New Zealand Chaplains Department.
- Warrant Officer Class One Barry Stewart – Royal New Zealand Army Ordnance Corps.
- Warrant Officer Class Two Edward Tataurangi – Royal New Zealand Infantry Regiment.
- Warrant Officer Ian David Cochrane – Royal New Zealand Air Force.
- Warrant Officer Gilbert Arthur Dampier – Royal New Zealand Air Force.
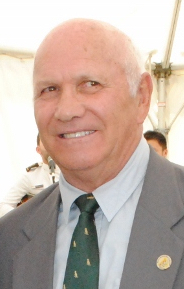
Sid Going

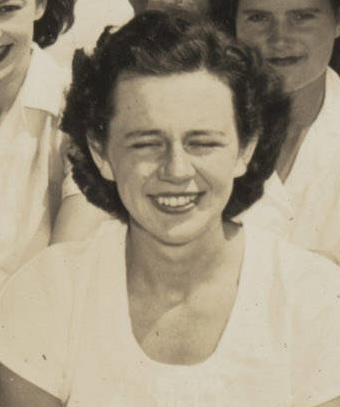
Norma Williams

== British Empire Medal (BEM) ==
Civil division

- Henry Sydney Bingham – of Dunedin North. For services as a stonemason.
- Margaret Dora Cranswick – of Matamata. For services to the girl guide movement and community.
- Oliver Hunter – of Lyttelton. For services to conservation.
- Mary Gertrude Kidd JP – of Auckland. For services to the community.
- John Harvey McKenzie – of Waikaka. For services to the protection of wildlife.
- Henry Lloyd Parker – of Waikanae. For services to the welfare of the aged.
- Jerzy Wlodzimierz Pobog-Jaworowski JP – of Lower Hutt. For services to the community.
- The Reverend Father Francis Joseph Skinner – of Puhoi. For services to the community.

Military division

- Chief Petty Officer David McKenzie Cloughley – Royal New Zealand Naval Volunteer Reserve.
- Temporary Chief Petty Officer Electrician Bruce Pukepuke – Royal New Zealand Navy.
- Sergeant Malcolm Gerald Amyes – Royal New Zealand Armoured Corps (Territorial Force).
- Staff Sergeant Theodore Marama – Royal New Zealand Infantry Regiment.
- Sergeant James Fraser Mitchell – Royal New Zealand Infantry Regiment.
- Warrant Officer Albert Edward Hill – Royal New Zealand Air Force.
- Sergeant Edmund Ronald Sturm – Royal New Zealand Air Force.

== Companion of the Queen's Service Order (QSO) ==
=== For community service ===
- Charles William Halliwell – of Wellington.
- The Reverend Gwendolen Gertrude Meyer – of Auckland.
- Trevor Steele Robinson JP – of Hamilton.
- Selwyn Featherston Toogood – of Upper Hutt.
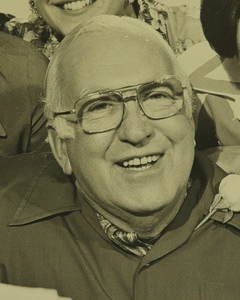
Selwyn Toogood

=== For public services ===
- Charles Erskine Bowmar – of Southland.
- James Bruce Collett – of Lyttelton.
- Louis Brassell Harder – superintendent, Department of Justice, Waikeria Youth Centre.
- Russell Atkinson Hutchinson JP – of Te Awamutu.
- Maurice Joel ED – of Dunedin.
- Alton Clive Johns JP – of Auckland.
- Rodger Norman Kerr – of Wellington; lately director, Marine Division, Ministry of Transport.
- The Honourable Norman James King – of Auckland. Member of Parliament, 1954–1975; Minister of the Crown, 1972–1975.
- Charles Graham Riley – of Christchurch.
- Richard William Sharp – of Wellington.
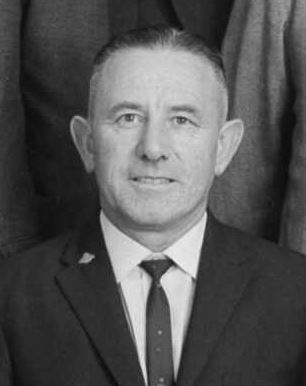
Norman King

== Queen's Service Medal (QSM) ==
=== For community service ===
- The Reverend (Miss) Lorna Elizabeth Aberley – of Hawera.
- Violet Caroline Amy Clarkson – of Dannevirke.
- Ada Coleman – of Nelson.
- Gwendoline Mary Culverwell – of Auckland.
- Alice Maud Deans – of Hastings.
- Thomas Dennis – of Gisborne.
- Olive Rita Furley – of Auckland.
- Betty Esme Goulden – of Christchurch.
- James Edward Craies Graham – of Invercargill.
- Moana Margaret Pringle Harley JP – of Auckland.
- Alfred Joan Walters Hodder JP – of Wanganui.
- Daphne Horton – of Oamaru.
- Evelyn Amy Jackson – of Dargaville.
- Charles Frederick Jenkins – of Auckland.
- John Harper Langdale JP – of Lower Hutt.
- Donald McAllister – of Dunedin.
- Frederick McComish – of Wellington.
- Ada Alexandra McDowall – of Christchurch.
- Eleanor Gwendoline Milne – of Gore.
- Evelyn May Robertson – of Otago.
- Cushla Margarete Ryan – of Christchurch.
- Joyce Helen Ussher JP – of Martinborough.
- Charles Reginald Williams – of Auckland.

=== For public services ===
- Ena Gertrude Avenell – district probation officer, Department of Justice, Auckland.
- Hazel May Blake JP – of Ōtaki.
- Betty Bourke JP – of Pātea.
- William Robert Edward Heenan JP – of Southland.
- William Hudson – of Gisborne.
- David Caliel Nimaytallah Khouri – senior investigating officer, Customs Department, Auckland.
- Michael Ivan Russell Kidd – of Hamilton.
- Leslie John Maloney – constable, New Zealand Police.
- William Herbert Prichard – transmission line engineer, New Zealand Electricity Department, Palmerston North.
- Brian Mowlem Sinclair – of São Paulo, Brazil.
- Rhondda Ellen Wishart – of Shannon.
- Emily Alice Wylie JP – of Auckland.
- Lionel Arthur Young – of Auckland.
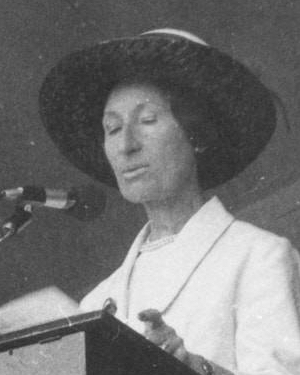
Alice Wylie

== Air Force Cross (AFC) ==
- Wing Commander Albert Edward Thomson – Royal New Zealand Air Force.

== Queen's Fire Service Medal (QFSM) ==
- Bernard Ralph Braithwaite – senior station officer, Port Chalmers Volunteer Fire Brigade.
- Frederick William Stringer – station officer, Silverstream Volunteer Fire Brigade.
- George Joseph Thompson – third officer, New Zealand Fire Service, Christchurch.

== Queen's Police Medal (QPM) ==
- Arthur Henry Hart – detective sergeant, New Zealand Police.

== Queen's Commendation for Valuable Service in the Air ==
- Master Air Loadmaster Daniel Scott – Royal New Zealand Air Force.
