= David Crooks =

David Crooks may refer to:

- David Crooks (RNZAF officer) (1931–2022), New Zealand air marshal
- Dave Crooks (born 1963), American politician

== See also ==
- Dave Barker (David Crooks, born 1948), Jamaican reggae musician
