= Richard Bolt (disambiguation) =

Richard Bolt (1911–2002) was an American professor of acoustics and founder of technology company BNN.

Richard Bolt is also the name of:

- Richard Bolt (RNZAF officer) (1923–2014), New Zealand bomber pilot in the Second World War
- Richard Bolt (MP), for Winchester in 1419
