= Arohaki Lagoon =

Lake in Bay of Plenty region, New Zealand

- Arahaki Lagoon
- Arohaki (Māori)
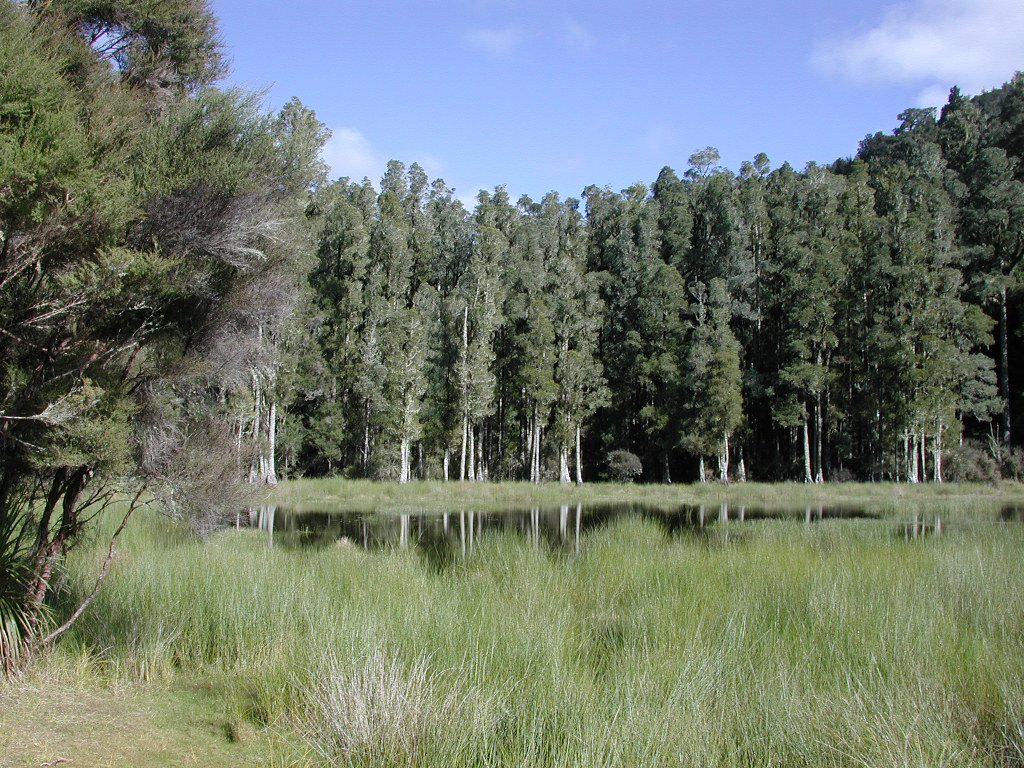
- Arohaki Lagoon, with kahikatea trees in the background

- Location of Arohaki Lagoon in the North Island
- Location: Whirinaki Te Pua-a-Tāne Conservation Park, North Island, New Zealand
- Coordinates: 38°40′50″S 176°39′40″E
- Type: lagoon

Arohaki Lagoon (formerly Arahaki Lagoon) is a small ephemeral lagoon located in the Whakatāne District of the North Island, New Zealand. It is within the Whirinaki Te Pua-a-Tāne Conservation Park, south and can be accessed via a 6-kilometre (3.7 mi) walking track.

== Etymology ==
The Ngāti Whare Claims Settlement Act 2012 changed the name of the lagoon from Arahaki to Arohaki. According to the Ngāti Whare Deed of Settlement, the name is taken from a description of "the taking off of the birds, one by one, circling around".

== Significance to Māori ==
Arohaki Lagoon holds significance for the local iwi, Ngāti Whare. It is seasonally used as a mahinga manu (bird gathering place), and the fish in the lagoon were used as a food source.

== Fauna and flora ==
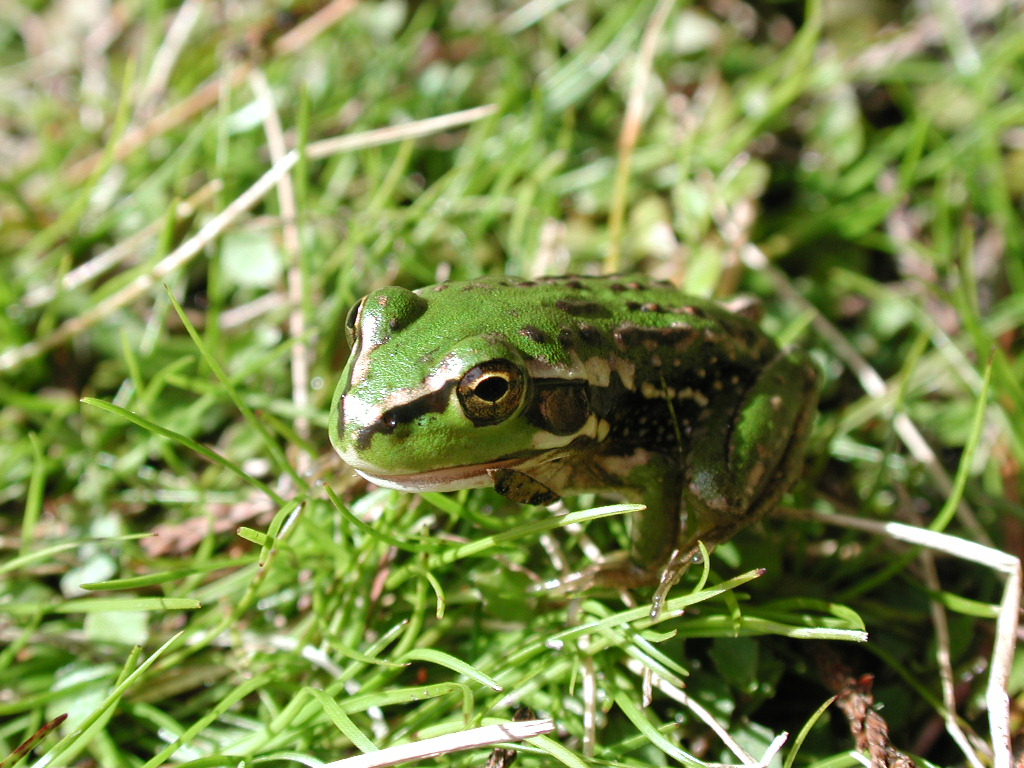
A juvenile southern bell frog at Arohaki Lagoon

Arohaki Lagoon contains kōkopu (native galaxiid fish), and serves as a sanctuary and breeding ground for various bird species. Frogs can also be found at the lagoon.

The lagoon contains a large population of water brome (Amphibromus fluitans), a threatened species of native grass. Kahikatea trees line the perimeter of Arohaki Lagoon.
