= List of New Zealand Māori AFL players =

This is a non-exhaustive list of Australian Football League and AFL Women's players of Māori descent, an ethnic group from New Zealand.

== Australian Football League (AFL) ==
- Paul Bower
- Greg Broughton
- Danny Dickfos
- Donald Dickie
- Dustin Martin
- Daniel McAlister
- Brett Peake
- Brian Peake
- Shane Savage
- Wayne Schwass
- Marley Williams

== AFL Women's ==
- Richelle Cranston
- Moana Hope
- Poppy Kelly
- Jesse Tawhiao-Wardlaw
- Stevie-Lee Thompson
- Brooke Walker

== See also ==
- List of VFL/AFL players with international backgrounds
- List of New Zealand Māori sportspeople
