= Te Whaiti =

Forested area on North Island, New Zealand

Coordinates: 38°35′S 176°47′E

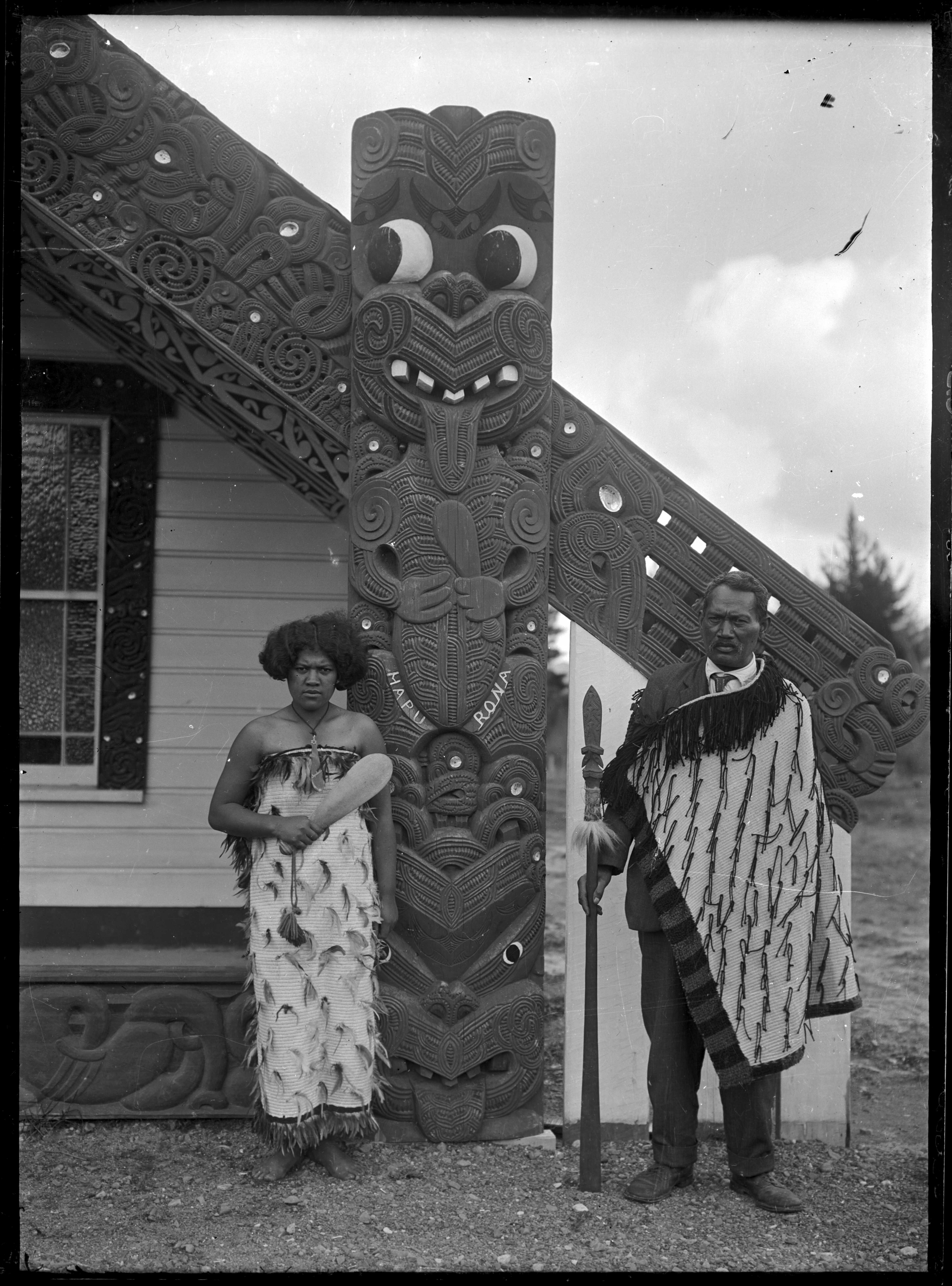
Chief Matekuare and his daughter Tuki outside a meeting house in Te Whaiti

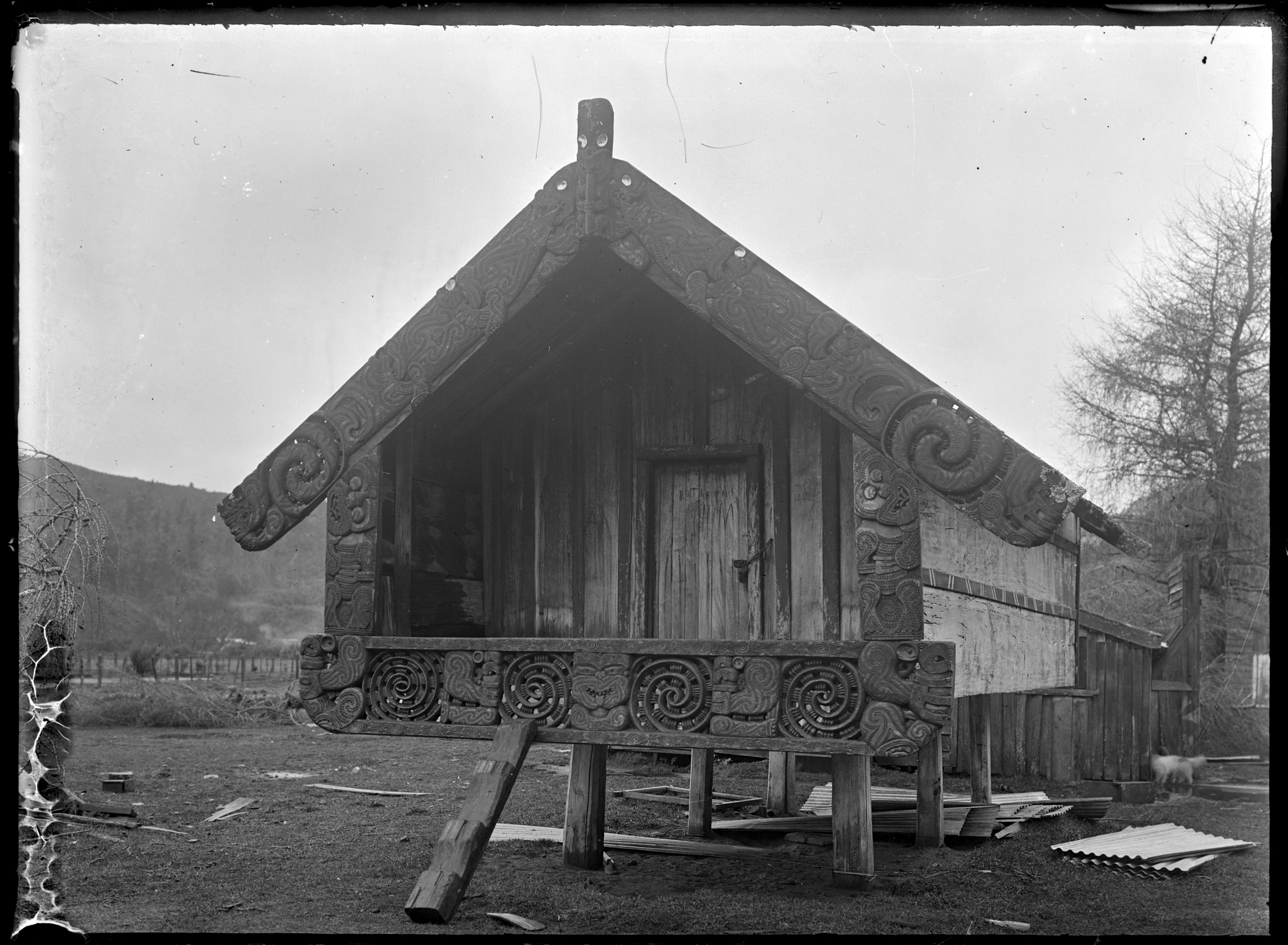
Carved pataka (storehouse) at Te Whaiti photographed in 1930

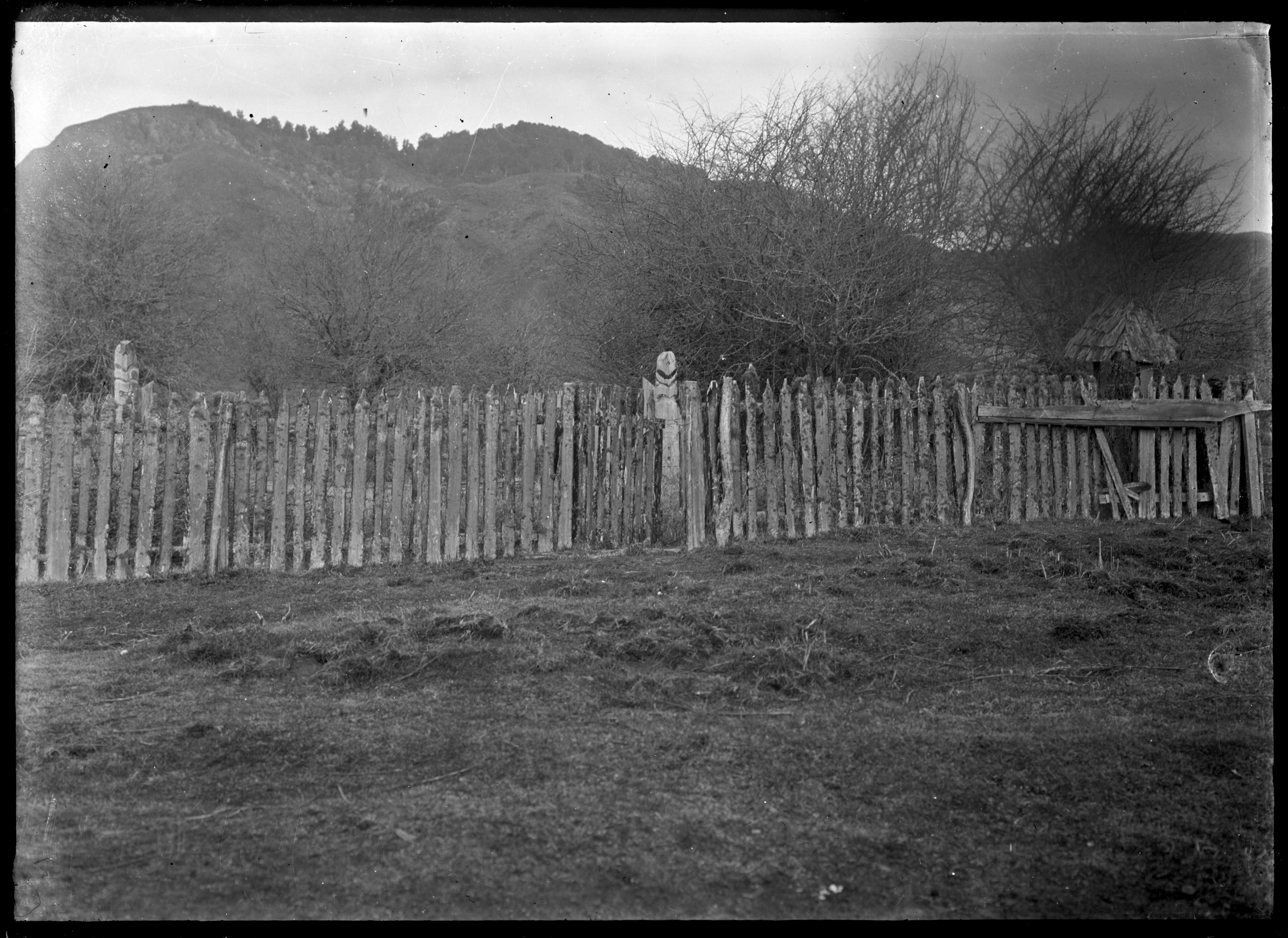
Fencing at the house of Te Kooti at Te Whaiti in 1930

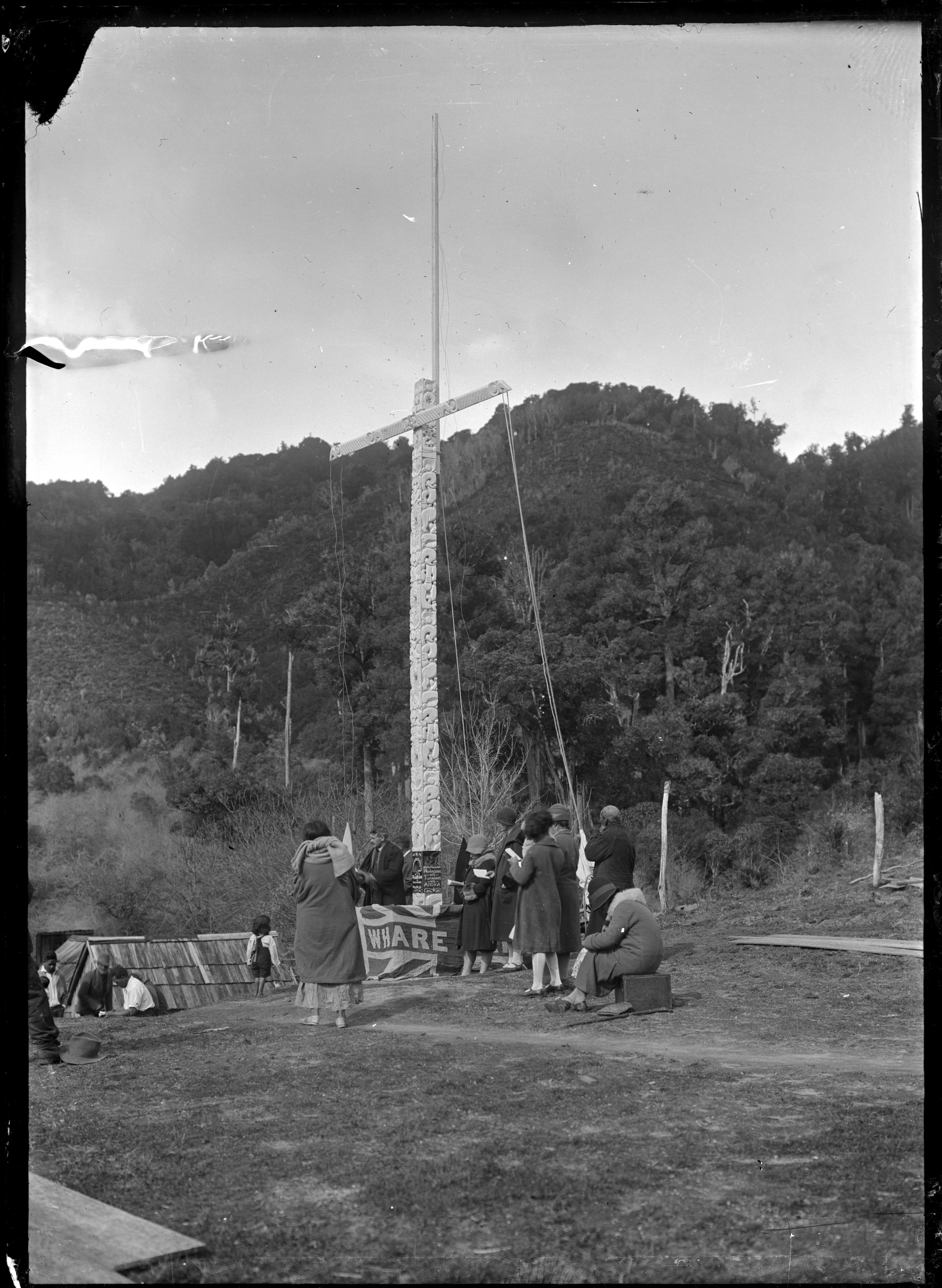
Flag dedication ceremony at Waireporepo Pa

Te Whaiti or Te Whāiti, formerly called Ahikereru, is a forested area in the Whakatāne District and Bay of Plenty Region of New Zealand's North Island. It is at the northern end of the Ahikereru valley – Minginui is at the southern end. The Whirinaki River flows through the valley.

The area's full Māori name, Te Whāiti-nui-a-Toi, translates as "the great canyon of Toi", referring to an ancestor of this area, Toi-kai-rākau / Toi-te-huatahi.

Albert Percy Godber took photographs of Māori art and architecture in the area.

== Marae ==
Te Whaiti is in the rohe (tribal area) of both Tūhoe and Ngāti Whare.

It has three marae:

- Waikotikoti Marae and Hinenuitepo meeting house is affiliated with the Tūhoe hapū of Te Karaha, Ngāti Hāmua, Warahoe, and with Ngāti Whare.
- Murumurunga Marae and Wharepakau meeting house is affiliated with both iwi.
- Waireporepo Marae is a meeting ground of Ngāti Whare; it has no meeting house.

In October 2020, the Government committed $793,189 from the Provincial Growth Fund to upgrade the Waikotikoti and Murumurunga Marae, creating 20 jobs.

== Education ==
A school opened in Te Whaiti in 1896 and merged with Minginui Forest School in 2004. The school is now Te Kura Toitu o Te Whaiti-nui-a-Toi, a co-educational state, Restricted Composite Special Character School.

== See also ==
- Te Urewera
- Whirinaki Te Pua-a-Tāne Conservation Park
