= 1967 Birthday Honours (New Zealand) =

Awards list for New Zealand

The 1967 Queen's Birthday Honours in New Zealand, celebrating the official birthday of Elizabeth II, were appointments made by the Queen on the advice of the New Zealand government to issue various orders and honours to reward and highlight good works by New Zealanders. They were announced on 10 June 1967.

The recipients of honours are displayed here as they were styled before their new honour.

== Knight Bachelor ==
- George Manning CMG – of Christchurch. For public services, especially to education and local government.
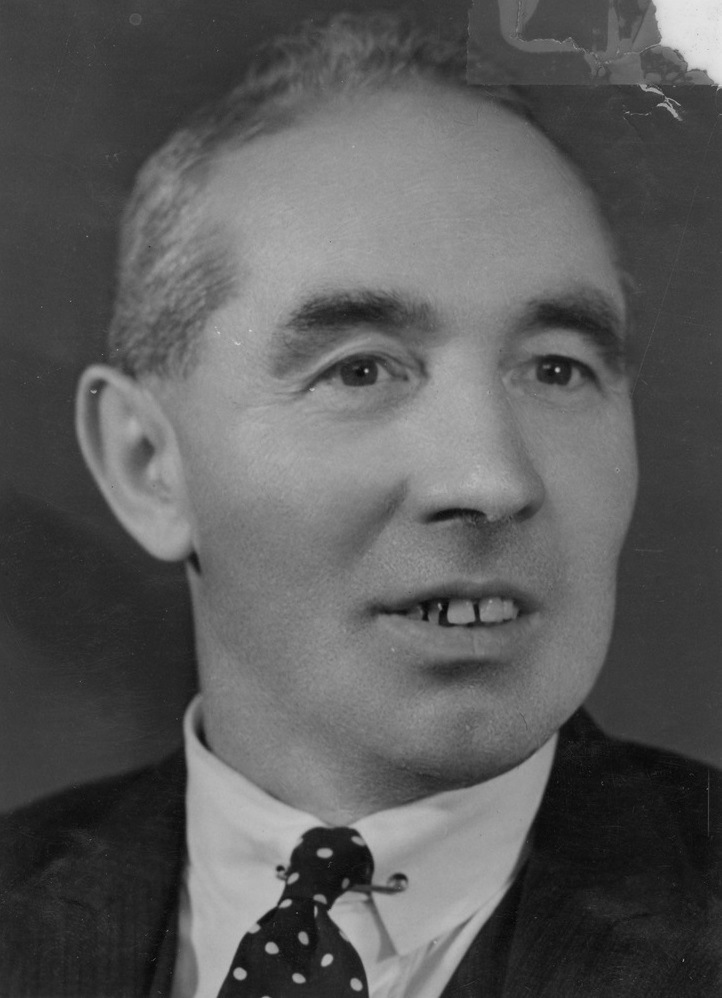
Sir George Manning

== Order of the Bath ==
=== Knight Commander (KCB) ===
Military division

- Lieutenant-General Leonard Whitmore Thornton CB CBE – Chief of Defence Staff, New Zealand Armed Forces.
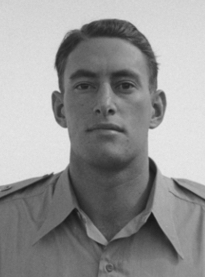
Sir Leonard Thornton

== Order of Saint Michael and Saint George ==
=== Companion (CMG) ===
- Albert William Liley PhD MB – of Auckland. For valuable services to medicine.
- Denzil Anthony Seaver Ward – of Wellington. For services as Law Draftsman and Compiler of Statutes.

== Royal Victorian Order ==
=== Knight Commander (KCVO) ===
- John Valentine Meech CVO – of Wellington.

== Order of the British Empire ==
=== Knight Commander (KBE) ===
Civil division

- Edward Denis Blundell OBE – of Wellington. For services to the legal profession.
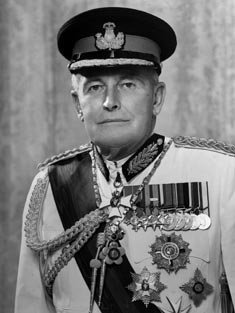
Sir Denis Blundell

=== Commander (CBE) ===
Civil division

- James Thomas Andrews – of Wellington. For valuable services in the fields of banking and economic research.
- John Sims Meadowcroft – of Paraparaumu. For services to commerce and the textile trade.
- Allan Meredith Satterthwaite – of Christchurch. For services to tourism, commercial and financial affairs.
- Leonard George Herston Sinclair JP – of Auckland; stipendiary magistrate.

Military division

- Brigadier Bertrand Reidhaar Bullot – Brigadiers' List (Regular Force).

=== Officer (OBE) ===
Civil division

- Hilda Kathleen Birks JP – of Lower Hutt. For valuable services in the field of social and local affairs.
- Captain Alexander Royle Champion JP – harbourmaster of Lyttelton.
- Lawson Lysnar Copland Field JP – of Gisborne. For valuable services to farming.
- Albert Hugh Flay – of Christchurch. For services to farming and teaching.
- David Forsyth – of Dunedin. For services to education.
- Alfred George Honnor JP – mayor of New Plymouth.
- Arthur Leigh Hunt – of Wellington. For valuable services to the community.
- Frederick Campbell Johnstons JP – of Whatawhata. For services to the pastoral industry.
- Hēnare Kōhere Ngata – of Gisborne. For services to the Māori people.
- John Addis Redwood – of Auckland. For services to the community, especially in connection with the care of old people.
- The Reverend William Morton Ryburn – of Auckland. For outstanding services as Presbyterian missionary and educationist.

Military division

- Commander Neil Dudley Anderson – Royal New Zealand Navy.
- Colonel Tristan Freitas Hegglun ED – Royal New Zealand Infantry Regiment (Territorial Force).
- Wing Commander David Ewan Jamieson – Royal New Zealand Air Force.
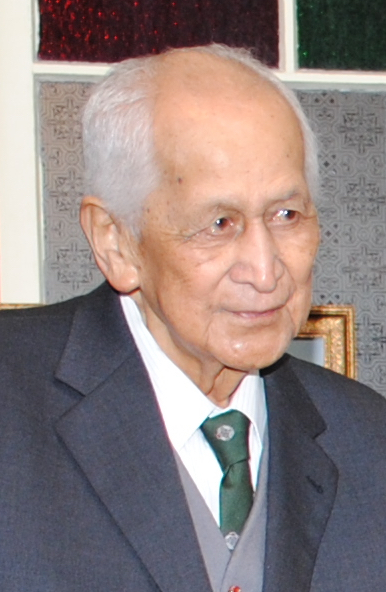
Hēnare Ngata

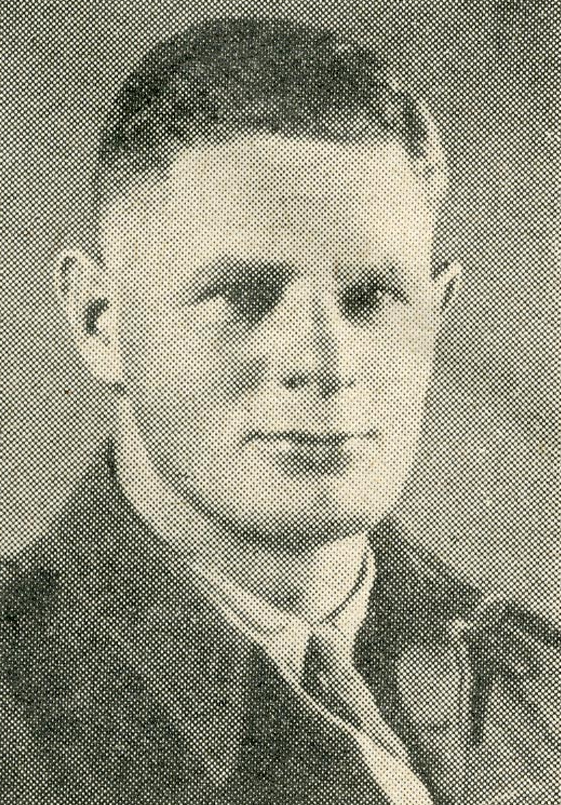
Tristan Hegglun

=== Member (MBE) ===
Civil division

- James Herries Beattie – of Waimate. For services to historical research in New Zealand.
- Edward Coventry Bydder MB ChB – of Tākaka. For services to the community.
- Jessie Duggan Dalgleish – of Raetihi. For services to nursing.
- Grace Farrell – of Westport. For services to the community.
- Frederick Christoph Jurgens – of Bulls. For services to the farming community.
- Irene May Casemore Lassen – of Christchurch. For services to music.
- William Douglas Lattimore – mayor of Balclutha.
- Lionel Deacon Lees – of Tauranga. For services to the community and local government.
- Florence Mary Morton Low – of Wellington. For services to the community in welfare and local-body work.
- Sabira Agnes Martin. For services to the community, especially as supervisor of the Nelson Occupation Centre, and in the field of education of intellectually handicapped children.
- Eric Joseph Naylor JP – of Oamaru. For services to the community especially as chairman of the Vincent Hospital Board.
- Allan North MB ChB – of Te Whaiti. For services to medicine and to the Māori people.
- Ellen Elizabeth Pickering – of Masterton. For services to the community.
- Leslie Bowden Quartermain – of Wellington. For services to the community, especially to youth and to the New Zealand Antarctic Society.
- Hubert Arthur Toneycliffe – of Timaru. For services to education and local affairs.
- Rose Evelyn Townshend – of Picton. For services to the community and local government.
- Ellen Margaret Uttley – of Wanganui. For services to the community in welfare and local affairs.
- Alice May Walton – of Auckland. For services to nursing.
- Edward Wellesley Wise JP – of Levin. For services to local government, particularly as mayor of Eastbourne Borough Council.

Military division

- Lieutenant Commander Neil Laurence Merrick – Royal Navy.
- Major Douglas Jo Dunn – Royal New Zealand Electrical and Mechanical Engineers (Territorial Force).
- Captain Lenard Donald Grant – Royal New Zealand Infantry Regiment (Regular Force).
- Captain Maurice David Stanley – Royal New Zealand Artillery (Regular Force).
- Flight Lieutenant Martin David Burns – Royal New Zealand Air Force (Air Training Corps).
- Warrant Officer Collis Litchfield Anderson – Royal New Zealand Air Force.
- Warrant Officer Roy Edward Spencer – Royal New Zealand Air Force.

== Companion of the Imperial Service Order (ISO) ==
- Gordon Owen Lindsay Dempster – lately Director of Public Health.

== British Empire Medal (BEM) ==
Civil division, for gallantry

- Patrick John O'Donovan – detective sergeant, New Zealand Police. For exceptional skill, coolness, perseverance and courage in obtaining a confession of murder from a man who was in possession of a loaded rifle and intermittently threatening to shoot.

Civil division

- David Barrett JP. For services to the community of Christchurch.
- William Reginald Burke JP. For services to the community of Kaukapakapa.
- Jack Davies. For services to the community of Wellington.
- Harriet Davy. For services to Meals on Wheels scheme in Dunedin.
- Allan Percy Farmer – forest ranger, New Zealand Forest Service.
- Joan Hopkins Hastings – instructor, Chief Post Office, Auckland.
- Herbert James Kerr – coxswain of the Sumner lifeboat.
- James Nicholas. For services to the community of Blenheim, especially in connection with hospital visiting.
- Te Hiko Miller Ormsby – engineer's assistant, New Zealand Electricity Department.
- Albert William Robertson – engine driver, New Zealand Railways.
- Bryan James Stewart – detective sergeant, New Zealand Police.

Military division

- Master-at-Arms (Coxswain) Tuta Denny – Royal New Zealand Navy.
- Chief Engine Room Artificer Rex Edward Lincoln – Royal New Zealand Navy.
- Stores Chief Petty Officer Raymond Herst Smith – Royal New Zealand Navy.
- Mechanician First Class Raymond Vernon Stevens – Royal New Zealand Navy.
- Sergeant James Michael Benyon – Royal New Zealand Army Medical Corps (Regular Force).
- Staff Sergeant Henry Cherrington – Royal New Zealand Army Education Corps (Regular Force).
- Warrant Office Class II (temporary) John Donald Desmond – Royal New Zealand Infantry Regiment (Regular Force).
- Flight Sergeant Albert Desmond McNicol – Royal New Zealand Air Force.
- Flight Sergeant Christopher Walter Mayes – Royal New Zealand Air Force.
- Flight Sergeant Alfred Charles Webster – Royal New Zealand Air Force.

== Air Force Cross (AFC) ==
- Squadron Leader Geoffrey Wallingford – Royal New Zealand Air Force.
- Flight Lieutenant Brian Kenneth Bassett – Royal New Zealand Air Force.

== Queen's Police Medal (QPM) ==
- Fergus Oliver Scott – chief superintendent, New Zealand Police Force.

== Queen's Commendation for Valuable Service in the Air ==
- Squadron Leader Albert Edward Thomson – Royal New Zealand Air Force.
