= List of New Zealand Māori sportspeople =

This is a list of New Zealand sportspeople who are Māori or of Māori descent. While Māori have been involved in many sports, they are particularly prominent in both forms of rugby.

Where known, the person's iwi are listed in brackets.

== Association football ==
- Leo Bertos
- Claudia Bunge (Ngāi Tuhoe)
- Moses Dyer
- Abby Erceg (Ngāpuhi)
- Rory Fallon (Ngati Porou)
- Amber Hearn (Ngāpuhi)
- Clayton Lewis (Ngāpuhi)
- Max Mata
- Heremaia Ngata
- Winston Reid (Tainui, Te Arawa)
- Rebecca Rolls (Ngāti Porou)
- Alex Rufer
- Shane Rufer
- Wynton Rufer (Ngāti Porou)
- Paige Satchell (Ngāpuhi)
- Tamati Williams
- Kirsty Yallop

== Athletics (track & field) ==
- Holly Robinson (Ngāi Tāhu)
- Sam Tanner (Ngāpuhi)

== Basketball ==
- Pero Cameron (Ngāpuhi)
- Brendon Pongia

== Boxing ==
- Shane Cameron
- Lani Daniels (Ngāti Hine)
- Daniella Smith (Ngāpuhi)

== Canoeing ==
- Lisa Carrington (Ngati Porou, Te Aitanga-a-Mahaki)
- Kayla Imrie (Te Whakatōhea)
- Kurtis Imrie (Te Whakatōhea)
- Jaimee Lovett (Ngāti Raukawa)

== Cricket ==
- Suzie Bates (Ngāi Tahu)
- Shane Bond (Ngāpuhi, Ngāi Tahu)
- Trent Boult (Ngāi Tahu, Ngāti Porou, Ngāi Te Rangi)
- Tama Canning
- Heath Davis
- Peter McGlashan (Ngāti Porou)
- Kyle Mills (Ngāi Tahu)
- Adam Parore - the first Maori man to play test cricket for New Zealand (Ngāpuhi)
- Jesse Ryder
- Ben Stokes (Ngāpuhi)
- Daryl Tuffey (Te Ātiawa)

== Cycling ==
- Pieter Bulling (Ngāi Tahu)
- Emma Foy (Ngāpuhi)
- Sam Gaze (Te Atiawa)
- Dylan Kennett (Ngāi Tahu)

== Diving ==
- Anton Down-Jenkins (Te Arawa)

== Equestrian ==
- Daniel Meech

== Golf ==
- Michael Campbell (Ngāti Ruanui, Ngāi Rauru)

== Gymnastics ==
- Courtney McGregor (Ngāti Kahungunu)

== Hockey ==
- Gemma Flynn (Te Arawa, Tainui)
- Charlotte Harrison (Ngāpuhi)
- Blair Hilton (Ngāpuhi)
- Kane Russell (Ngāpuhi)
- Kayla Whitelock (Rangitāne)

== Horseracing ==
- Michael Walker

== Judo ==
- Darcina-Rose Manuel (Ngāti Porou)

== Lawn bowls ==
- Shannon McIlroy (Ngāti Porou)

== Netball ==
A selection of Māori netball players who have represented New Zealand. Margaret Matangi, June Mariu, Waimarama Taumaunu, Temepara Bailey and Ameliaranne Ekenasio all captained New Zealand. Taumaunu and Noeline Taurua have both been New Zealand head coaches.

Player	Appearances	Years	Affiliations
Margaret Matangi	1	1938	Te Āti Awa, Taranaki, Ngāti Mutunga
June Mariu	3	1960	Ngāti Porou
Tilly Vercoe	19	1967–1971	Ngāti Pikiao, Ngāti Kea Ngāti Tuarā, Ngāti Manawa
Waimarama Taumaunu	77	1981–1991	Ngāti Porou, Ngāi Tahu
Noeline Taurua	34	1994–1999	Ngāpuhi
Temepara Bailey	89	1996–2011	Ngāpuhi
Jodi Brown	61	2002–2015	
Joline Henry	91	2003–2014	
Ameliaranne Ekenasio	47	2014–	Ngāti Kahu, Ngāpuhi
Te Paea Selby-Rickit	48	2016–	

== Rowing ==
- Kelsey Bevan
- Michael Brake (Ngāti Porou)
- Kirstyn Goodger
- Jackie Gowler (Rangitāne)
- Kerri Gowler (Rangitāne)
- Caleb Shepherd (Ngāti Porou)
- Jade Uru (Ngāi Tahu)

== Sailing ==
- Paul Snow-Hansen (Ngāpuhi)

== Softball ==
- Nathan Nukunuku (Ngāti Porou)

== Squash ==
- Leilani Joyce (Ngāti Hine, Ngāi Te Rangi, Tainui)
- Joelle King (Ngāti Porou)

== Swimming ==
- Lewis Clareburt (Tainui)
- Erika Fairweather (Ngāi Tahu)
- Cameron Leslie (Ngāpuhi)
- Corey Main (Ngāti Porou, Ngāpuhi)
- Kane Radford (Ngāti Tūwharetoa, Te Arawa)
- Emma Robinson (Ngāpuhi)

== Triathlon ==
- Tayler Reid (Ngāti Kahunungu)

== Weightlifting ==
- Kanah Andrews-Nahu (Ngāti Porou, Ngāpuhi)
