= Ian Monro =

New Zealand naval officer

Ian Scott Monro
- Born: 24 October 1927; Christchurch, New Zealand
- Died: 27 October 2014 (aged 87); Auckland, New Zealand
- Military career
- Allegiance: New Zealand
- Branch: Royal New Zealand Navy
- Service years: 1945–1977
- Rank: Commander
- Commands: HMNZS Lachlan (1965–69)
- Conflicts: Korean War
- Awards: Officer of the Order of the British Empire

Ian Scott Monro OBE (24 October 1927 – 27 October 2014) was a New Zealand naval officer. He served in the Royal New Zealand Navy from 1945 to 1977, and commanded HMNZS Lachlan for four years.

== Naval career ==
Monro enlisted in the Royal New Zealand Navy in 1945, training as a cadet at the Royal Naval College, Dartmouth, temporarily housed at Eaton Hall. Following his return to New Zealand he joined the survey ship HMNZS Lachlan and saw service in the Korean War on HMNZS Rotoiti, before transfer to the Hydrographic Branch. He commanded HMNZS Lachlan from September 1965 until December 1969 and was Hydrographer RNZN for seven years.

He gained the rank of acting sub-lieutenant in 1948, lieutenant in 1950, lieutenant commander in 1958, and commander at the end of 1966. He retired with that rank in October 1977.

In the 1977 New Year Honours, he was appointed an Officer of the Order of the British Empire.

Monro died on 27 October 2014.
