= Barbara Anderson (writer) =

New Zealander writer

- c. 2009
- Born: Barbara Lillias Romaine Wright; 14 April 1926; Hastings, New Zealand
- Died: 24 March 2013 (aged 86); Auckland, New Zealand
- Education: University of Otago; Victoria University of Wellington
- Occupation: Writer
- Spouse: Sir Neil Anderson (m. 1951; died 2010)
- Children: 2
- Writing career
- Genres: Short Stories, novels

Barbara Lillias Romaine Anderson, Lady Anderson (née Wright, 14 April 1926 – 24 March 2013) was a New Zealand fiction writer who became internationally recognised and a best-selling author after her first book was published in her sixties.

== Career ==
Born Barbara Lillias Romaine Wright in Hastings, she was educated at the University of Otago where she graduated with a Bachelor of Science degree in 1947. In 1951, she married Neil Anderson, a Royal New Zealand Navy officer later to become Chief of New Zealand Defence Staff. They had two sons. After a career as a medical technologist and as a teacher, she went back to university in Wellington, New Zealand, where she graduated with a Bachelor of Arts degree from the Victoria University of Wellington in 1984.

Anderson took Bill Manhire's creative writing course at Victoria University in 1983, after which she began her writing career. Her short stories were published in journals and magazines such as Landfall, Sport and the New Zealand Listener. Her first book was a collection of short stories, I Think We Should Go Into the Jungle. Her third book, the novel Portrait of the Artist's Wife (1992), received first prize at the Goodman Fielder Wattie Book Awards in 1992. It was a bestseller and received critical acclaim in New Zealand and overseas.

Her husband was knighted in 1982, and she was subsequently styled Lady Anderson. In 2009 she was awarded an honorary Doctor of Literature from the University of Otago, and in 2011 she received the prestigious Arts Foundation Icon Award.

She died in Auckland on 24 March 2013.

== Works ==
- I Think We Should Go Into the Jungle : Short Stories. Wellington : Victoria University Press, 1989; London: Secker & Warburg, 1993.
- Girls' High. Wellington : Victoria University Press, 1990, 1999; London: Secker & Warburg, 1991.
- Portrait of the Artist's Wife. Wellington : Victoria University Press, 1992; London: Secker & Warburg, 1992; New York: Norton, 1993; London: Minerva, 1993.
- All the Nice Girls. Wellington : Victoria University Press, 1993, 1999; London: Cape, 1994; London: Vintage, 1995.
- The House Guest. Wellington : Victoria University Press, 1995; London: Cape, 1995; London: Vintage, 1997.
- Proud Garments. Wellington : Victoria University Press, 1996.
- The Peacocks : and Other Stories. Wellington : Victoria University Press, 1997.
- Glorious things, and other stories. London: Cape, 1999.
- Long Hot Summer. Wellington: Victoria University Press, 1999; London: Cape, 2000.
- The Swing Around. Wellington: Victoria University Press, 2001.
- Getting There: An Autobiography, 2008

== See also ==
- New Zealand literature
