= Neil Anderson (RNZN officer) =

Senior officer of the Royal New Zealand Navy

Vice Admiral Sir Neil Anderson
- Born: 5 April 1927; Hastings, New Zealand
- Died: 5 June 2010 (aged 83); Wellington, New Zealand
- Spouse: Barbara Anderson (m. 1951)
- Military career
- Allegiance: New Zealand
- Branch: Royal New Zealand Navy
- Service years: 1944–1983
- Rank: Vice Admiral
- Commands: Chief of Defence Staff; Chief of Naval Staff; HMNZS Philomel; HMNZS Waikato; HMNZS Taranaki
- Conflicts: Second World War; Occupation of Japan; Korean War
- Awards: Knight Commander of the Order of the British Empire; Companion of the Order of the Bath

Vice Admiral Sir Neil Dudley Anderson, KBE, CB (5 April 1927 – 5 June 2010) was a senior officer in the Royal New Zealand Navy (RNZN). He served as Chief of Naval Staff, the professional head of the RNZN, from 1978 to 1980 and as Chief of Defence Staff from 1980 to 1983. He married the author Barbara Anderson in 1951, and the couple had two children. He died on 5 June 2010 aged 83.

Anderson was appointed an Officer of the Order of the British Empire in the 1967 Queen's Birthday Honours, and advanced to Commander of the same order in the 1977 New Year Honours. Also in 1977, he was awarded the Queen Elizabeth II Silver Jubilee Medal. He was appointed a Companion of the Order of the Bath in the 1980 New Year Honours, and knighted as a Knight Commander of the Order of the British Empire in the 1982 Queen's Birthday Honours.

Military offices
Preceded by Air Marshal Sir Richard Bolt	Chief of Defence Staff; 1980–1983	Succeeded by Air Marshal Sir Ewan Jamieson
Preceded by Rear Admiral John McKenzie	Chief of Naval Staff; 1977–1980	Succeeded by Rear Admiral Keith Saull
