= Larry Siegert =

New Zealand air officer

Cyril Laurence Siegert
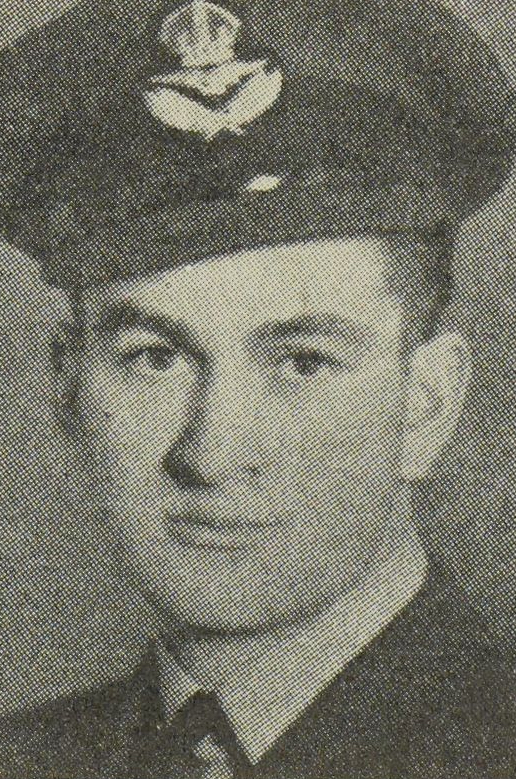
- Born: 14 March 1923; Fairlie, New Zealand
- Died: 17 September 2007 (aged 84); Lower Hutt, New Zealand
- Military career
- Allegiance: New Zealand
- Branch: Royal New Zealand Air Force
- Service years: 1943–1979
- Rank: Air Vice Marshal
- Nickname: Larry
- Units: No. 299 Squadron RAF; No. 190 Squadron RAF; No. 24 Squadron RAF; No. 42 Squadron RNZAF
- Commands: Chief of the Air Staff; RNZAF Operations Group; No. 3 Squadron RNZAF
- Conflicts: Second World War; Operation Tonga; Operation Market Garden; Operation Jedburgh; Operation Doomsday; Cold War; Berlin Airlift
- Awards: Companion of the Order of the Bath; Commander of the Order of the British Empire; Member of the Royal Victorian Order; Distinguished Flying Cross; Air Force Cross
- Other work: Company director

Air Vice Marshal Cyril Laurence Siegert, CB, CBE, MVO, DFC, AFC (14 March 1923 – 17 September 2007) was an air officer of the Royal New Zealand Air Force, who served as a bomber pilot during the Second World War and rose to be Chief of the Air Staff, the most senior appointment in the RNZAF, from 1976 to 1979.

== Early life and education ==
Siegert was born in Fairlie, New Zealand, on 14 March 1923, the son of Lawrence Walter Siegert and his wife Juliet Ann (née Sheehan). He was educated at Fairlie District High School and St Kevin's College, Oamaru. He then attended the Victoria University of Wellington studying law, but quit his studies to enlist into Royal New Zealand Air Force on 8 March 1942, a few days before his 19th birthday.

== Second World War ==
Siegert received his elementary training in New Zealand, before being sent to Canada to qualify as a pilot under the Empire Training Scheme. He was eventually sent to England and served in Nos 299 and 190 Squadrons RAF, both airborne forces squadrons, flying the Stirling four-engined bomber in the troop transport and glider-towing role. In addition they also flew missions for the Special Operations Executive (SOE), dropping men and supplies into occupied Europe.

Early on 6 June 1944 Siegert saw action during Operation Tonga, the British airborne operation launched to precede the beach landings, his No. 190 Squadron aircraft towing a glider carrying men from the 5th Parachute Brigade.

In September 1944 No. 190 Squadron also supported the attempt to advance into the Netherlands, Operation Market Garden. Siegert's aircraft carried parachute troops on the opening day of the battle, then returned on subsequent days dropping supplies to the troops on the ground. On 21 September, the fifth day of the operation, Siegert's squadron was sent to air-drop supplies to the British troops encircled at Oosterbeek. Unfortunately their fighter escorts were largely grounded by fog over England, and the few that did manage to take off arrived late. As a result, the low-flying transports were an easy target for German Fw 190 fighters, and of the 117 transport aircraft that took part in operations that day, 23 were shot down and 38 severely damaged. Of the ten aircraft from No. 109 Squadron, seven were lost. Siegert's aircraft was hit by anti-aircraft fire, then attacked by two enemy Fw 190's, one of which his rear-gunner shot down, before he evaded the other in a violent high-speed dive.

Siegert was subsequently awarded the Distinguished Flying Cross on 17 November 1944, "in recognition of gallantry and devotion to duty in the execution of air operations". His full citation read:

Flying Officer Siegert has proved himself a most capable pilot and captain of aircraft. He took part in the liberation of Normandy and the airborne operations in Holland. During a recent daylight sortie his aircraft was damaged by intense anti-aircraft fire, in the face of which he completed his mission successfully. On the homeward flight, the aircraft was attacked simultaneously by two Focke-Wulf fighters, one of which did further damage. The other was probably shot down by the rear gunner. During a total of four attacks, the aircraft was still being engaged by the ground defences. Despite this, by superb handling of his aircraft, Flying Officer Siegert was able to ward off the enemy and make a safe return to base.

Siegert continued to take part in No. 190 Squadron's special operations over France, Holland, Belgium, and Norway until the end of the war.

== Post-war career ==
In late 1945 Siegert was seconded to the British Overseas Airways Corporation, flying Dakota transport aircraft to Cairo and West Africa for the next two years. In 1948–1949 he was loaned to No. 24 (Commonwealth) Squadron RAF, flying in supplies during the Berlin Airlift.

In 1953, Siegert was awarded the Queen Elizabeth II Coronation Medal.

In October 1953 Squadron Leader Siegert was the second pilot of the RNZAF Hastings transport aircraft that took part in the London-Christchurch air race. The Hastings competed in the Transport Handicap against a KLM DC-6A and a BEA Viscount, but was forced to land in Negombo, Ceylon, after its No. 2 engine failed during a rain storm. He was subsequently awarded the Air Force Cross in the 1954 New Year Honours, and also served as captain of the Queen's aircraft during the royal tour of New Zealand in December 1953 and January 1954, being made a Member of the Royal Victorian Order on 20 January 1954.

Siegert served as an air attaché at the New Zealand Embassy in Washington D.C. between 1954 and 1957, then attended the RAF Staff College in England. He served in Far East Command from 1963 to 1965 then commanded No. 3 Squadron RNZAF from January to November 1966.

He was served as Air Officer Commanding RNZAF Operations Group in 1969, and from 1971 to 1973 was chief of staff of the ANZUK forces stationed at Singapore. He was then appointed Deputy Chief of Defence Staff (Policy), serving until 1976, being made a Commander of the Order of the British Empire in the 1975 Queen's Birthday Honours.

He was promoted to air vice marshal and appointed Chief of the Air Staff in October 1976, serving until October 1979. In the 1979 New Year Honours, he was made a Companion of the Order of the Bath.

== Retirement ==
Siegert retired from the RNZAF on 16 November 1979, and joined Marine–Air Systems, serving as General Manager and Director from 1980 to 1984. He was also the President of the Air Cadet League (1980–1985) and a Member of the Air Services Licensing Authority (1980–1986).

On 17 September 2007 Siegert died at Lower Hutt Hospital, aged 84, nine days after the death of his wife.

== Personal life ==
Siegert married Shirley Berenice Dick in Brisbane, Australia, on 31 July 1948, and they had four children.

Military offices
Preceded by Air Vice Marshal Richard Bolt	Chief of the Air Staff; 1976–1979	Succeeded by Air Vice Marshal Ewan Jamieson
