= Darryn Webb =

New Zealand air force officer

- Webb in 2024
- Military career
- Allegiance: New Zealand
- Branch: Royal New Zealand Air Force
- Service years: 1990–present
- Rank: Air Vice-Marshal
- Commands: Chief of Air Force; RNZAF Base Ohakea; No. 488 Wing RNZAF; No. 40 Squadron RNZAF
- Conflicts: War in Afghanistan; Iraq War
- Awards: Member of the New Zealand Order of Merit

Air Vice-Marshal Darryn Robert Webb, MNZM is a Royal New Zealand Air Force officer. During the COVID-19 pandemic, he served as head of managed isolation and quarantine from June to December 2020 as part of the New Zealand government's response to the virus. He was appointed Chief of Air Force in October 2023.

== Military career ==
Webb joined the Royal New Zealand Air Force in 1990. Beginning as a transport pilot, he later held other roles including Hercules flight commander, and deputy director of strategic commitments. He was appointed senior commander of RNZAF Base Ohakea in 2014, and in 2016 he became deputy chief of Air Force.

Early in the COVID-19 pandemic, Webb was seconded to the COVID-19 Operational Command Centre and was involved in planning of government repatriation operations from April 2020. In June, the government appointed Webb to head the managed isolation and quarantine (MIQ) system, and he served in that role until December that year, when he was succeeded by Brigadier Jim Bliss. Webb implemented an operational framework for MIQ aimed at setting consistent and safe operations and infection prevention and control standards, and during his tenure more than 80,000 people entered New Zealand through the MIQ system.

In the 2022 New Year Honours, Webb was appointed a Member of the New Zealand Order of Merit for services to the New Zealand Defence Force.

Webb succeeded Air Vice-Marshal Andrew Clark as Chief of Air Force on 2 October 2023 and was promoted to air vice-marshal.
