= Betty Bourke =

New Zealand politician (1924–2015)

Betty Bourke CBE QSM JP
- Born: Betty Lucas; 23 July 1924
- Died: 7 December 2015 (aged 91); Whanganui, New Zealand

Betty Bourke CBE QSM JP (née Lucas, 23 July 1924 – 7 December 2015) was a New Zealand local-body politician and health administrator. She was first elected to the Patea Hospital Board in 1962, and later served as the board's chair for three years, unsuccessfully leading the fight against amalgamation with neighbouring hospital boards. In 1969, she became the representative for Patea on the Wanganui Hospital Board, becoming chair in 1980. She was prominent in the establishment of the Wanganui Regional Hospice Service in 1981.

In the 1977 New Year Honours, Bourke was awarded the Queen's Service Medal for public services. She was appointed a Commander of the Order of the British Empire, for services to health administration and the community, in the 1988 Queen's Birthday Honours. In 1977, she was awarded the Queen Elizabeth II Silver Jubilee Medal, and in 1990 she received the New Zealand 1990 Commemoration Medal. Active in the Roman Catholic church, Bourke was appointed a Dame of the Order of St Gregory the Great in 1998.

Her daughter, Margot Mains, served as the chief executive of MidCentral Health from 1992 to 1999 and Capital Coast Health from 1999 to 2007. Bourke died in Whanganui on 7 December 2015.
