= Lawson Field (aviator) =

New Zealand farmer and aviator (1896–1981)

Lawson Lysnar Copland Field OBE (11 February 1896 – 29 May 1981) was a New Zealand farmer and aerial-topdressing operator. He was born in Gisborne, New Zealand on 11 February 1896.

In the 1967 Queen's Birthday Honours, Field was appointed an Officer of the Order of the British Empire, for services to farming.

There is a theatre in Gisborne, New Zealand named after him.
