= Ewan Jamieson =

NZ Air Force Air Marshal (1930–2013)

Sir Ewan Jamieson
- Born: David Ewan Jamieson; 19 April 1930; Christchurch, New Zealand
- Died: 21 March 2013 (aged 82); Taupō, New Zealand
- Spouse: Margaret Bridge (m. 1957)
- Children: 4
- Military career
- Allegiance: New Zealand
- Branch: Royal New Zealand Air Force
- Service years: 1949–1986
- Rank: Air Marshal
- Commands: Chief of the Defence Staff (1983–86); Chief of the Air Staff (1979–83)
- Awards: Knight Commander of the Order of the British Empire; Companion of the Order of the Bath

Air Marshal Sir David Ewan Jamieson, KBE, CB (19 April 1930 – 21 March 2013) was a senior commander in the Royal New Zealand Air Force. He was Chief of the Air Staff from 1979 to 1983, and Chief of the Defence Staff from 1983 to 1986.

== Early life ==
Jamieson was born on 19 April 1930 in Christchurch. His father was Raymond Douglas Jamieson (1906–1982), who was later the chief judge of the Arbitration Court. His mother was Florence Ethel Jamieson (née Parsons). He received his schooling at Christchurch Boys' High School and New Plymouth Boys' High School. He married Margaret Elaine Bridge in 1957, and the couple went on to have four children.

== Air force career ==
Jamieson joined the Royal New Zealand Air Force (RNZAF) in 1949, served on an exchange posting to Germany in 1954, and held command posts by the end of the 1950s. Achieving air officer rank in 1974, his senior appointments were from 1974 to 1978 Air Officer Commanding RNZAF Operations Group. Thereafter he was Deputy Chief of Defence Staff (from 1978 to 1979). This was followed by a period as the professional head of the RNZAF, the Chief of the Air Staff from 1979 to 1983 and a period as New Zealand's most senior military appointment, the Chief of the Defence Staff (CDS) until his retirement in 1986. During his time as CDS, Jamieson tried to avoid a controversy with the United States over the then Labour government's decision to ban nuclear vessels from visiting New Zealand and preserve the ANZUS defence treaty. In the end Jamieson's compromise solution of accepting a non-nuclear US Navy vessel into New Zealand's waters was not accepted by the government.

== Later life and death ==
Jamieson retired as Chief of the Defence Staff in 1986, despite being offered an extension to his term in the role; he later said that he wished to be free to engage in public debate about defence policy. Subsequently, he was critical of successive National and Labour governments' decisions, particularly in relation to New Zealand's anti-nuclear policy, and cuts to defence spending. His thoughts were set out in his book, Friend or Ally, published in 1990.

In retirement, Jamieson lived in Taupō, and he died there on 21 March 2013, at the age of 82. His wife, Margaret, Lady Jamieson, died in 2025.

== Honours ==
In 1977, Jamieson was awarded the Queen Elizabeth II Silver Jubilee Medal. In the 1981 New Year Honours, he was appointed a Companion of the Order of the Bath. He was made an Officer of the Order of the British Empire in the 1967 Queen's Birthday Honours, and promoted to Knight Commander of the Order of the British Empire in the 1986 New Year Honours.

Military offices
| Preceded by Vice Admiral Sir Neil Anderson | Chief of the Defence Staff; 1983–1986 | Succeeded by Air Marshal David Crooks |
| Preceded by Air Vice Marshal Larry Siegert | Chief of the Air Staff; 1979–1983 | Succeeded by Air Vice Marshal David Crooks |
