= John Hamilton (RNZAF officer) =

Former officer of the Royal New Zealand Air Force

- Born: 1953 (age 72–73)
- Military career
- Allegiance: New Zealand
- Branch: Royal New Zealand Air Force
- Service years: 1971–2006
- Rank: Air Vice Marshal
- Commands: Chief of Air Force (2002–2006); RNZAF Air Command (1998–2002); RNZAF Base Ohakea (1996–1998); No. 3 Squadron RNZAF (1989–1990)
- Awards: Companion of the New Zealand Order of Merit; Member of the Royal Victorian Order

Air Vice Marshal John Henry Staples Hamilton, CNZM, MVO (born 1953) is a former officer of the Royal New Zealand Air Force (RNZAF) who was Chief of Air Force from 2002 to 2006 and head of the Ministry of Civil Defence and Emergency Management from 2006 to 2014. Since 2019 he has been the operations manager for Air Napier.

== Biography ==
Hamilton was born and grew up in Hawke's Bay, living at Pōrangahau. He joined the Royal New Zealand Air Force in 1971 as a university officer cadet, and graduated from the University of Canterbury in science. He became a helicopter pilot, then a flying instructor. He was in No. 3 Squadron RNZAF and then did exchange duty with the Royal Australian Air Force at RAAF Base Amberley in Queensland from 1979 to 1981, before returning to No. 3 Squadron. He, then a 28-year-old flight lieutenant, was equerry to Queen Elizabeth II when she and the Duke of Edinburgh visited New Zealand in October 1981, for which he was made a member of the Royal Victorian Order. He led the planning for the New Zealand deployment in the International Force East Timor, for which he was appointed an Officer of the New Zealand Order of Merit in the 2001 New Year Honours. He was Chief of Air Force with the rank of two-star air vice-marshal from February 2002 until he retired from the Air Force in April 2006. He was promoted to Companion of the New Zealand Order of Merit (CNZM) in the 2006 Queen's Birthday Honours for his leadership of the Air Force.

In June 2006 it was announced that Hamilton would become the Director of New Zealand's Ministry of Civil Defence and Emergency Management from August that year. Following the February 2011 Christchurch earthquake, he became National Controller of the Civil Defence Emergency Response, with Civil Defence as lead agency, supported by New Zealand Police, Fire Service, Defence Force and many other agencies and organisations. He stepped down from Civil Defence in 2014.

He retired to Hawke's Bay but came out of retirement in 2019 to become operations manager for Air Napier.

Military offices
| Preceded by Air Vice Marshal Don Hamilton | Chief of Air Force; 2002–2006 | Succeeded by Air Vice Marshal Graham Lintott |
