= Margaret Matangi =

New Zealand netball player

Margaret Matangi MBE
Personal information
- Full name: Margaret Kahurangi Matangi
- Born: 9 July 1911 New Plymouth, New Zealand
- Died: 2 August 1990 (aged 79) Hāwera, New Zealand
- Occupation: Schoolteacher
- Height: 1.78 m (5 ft 10 in)
- School: New Plymouth Girls' High School
- University: Auckland Teachers' Training College

Netball career
- Playing positions: GS, GA, GD, GK
| Years | National team | Caps |
| 1938 | New Zealand | 1 |

Margaret Kahurangi Matangi MBE (9 July 1911 – 2 August 1990) was a New Zealand netball player. She captained the New Zealand team in their first Test match, in 1938 against Australia.

== Early life ==
Born in New Plymouth on 9 July 1911, Matangi was the daughter of Hinehau Matangi (née Karena) and Tioro Matangi. Of Māori descent, she affiliated to Te Āti Awa, Taranaki, and Ngāti Mutunga. She was educated at New Plymouth Girls' High School where she excelled at sports, winning the senior athletics championship while in the third form and the three following years.

== Netball career ==
=== Domestic ===
Matangi played representative netball for Taranaki in 1930 and 1931. She moved to Wellington in 1932, where she was a member of the Victoria University College club and a provincial representative. The following year, she represented Auckland, before returning to Taranaki and playing for the provincial team there in 1934 and 1935. She returned to Auckland in 1936, once again gaining provincial honours, and studied at Auckland Teachers' Training College. She captained the Auckland University and New Zealand Universities netball (at that time called basketball) teams, and was awarded Auckland and New Zealand blues. She also captained Taranaki, and was vice-captain of the Auckland provincial team.

=== International ===
In 1936, Matangi was first selected to tour Australia with a New Zealand national team the following season, but the tour did not proceed. In 1938, Matangi became the first New Zealand netball team captain, when a national side travelled to Australia and competed in the Australian interstate tournament in Melbourne. At times, the New Zealand team struggled as the matches were played on grass courts under Australian rules, which differed from those used in New Zealand at the time, but they defeated Queensland 13–9, before losing to Victoria 16–48 However, in an exhibition match played under New Zealand rules, the New Zealand team beat Victoria 19–5. In New Zealand's remaining matches of the tournament, they were defeated by South Australia 14–47 and Tasmania 17–32, before overcoming New South Wales 21–18.

In the single Test match, the first played between New Zealand and Australia, in Melbourne on 20 August 1938, New Zealand were defeated 11–40. The match was played under Australian rules. Matangi's international career was cut short by World War II, with New Zealand not playing another Test until 1948.

== Later life and death ==
Matangi spent her working life as a schoolteacher, in particular with special-needs children. This led to her appointment as a Member of the Order of the British Empire, for services to the education and training of mentally handicapped children, in the 1977 New Year Honours.

Matangi died in Hāwera on 2 August 1990, and was buried in Hāwera Cemetery. In 2009, she was posthumously inducted into the Māori Sports Hall of Fame.
