= 1981 New Zealand bravery awards =

The 1981 New Zealand bravery awards were announced via a Special Honours List on 17 December 1981, and recognised seven people for acts of bravery in 1980 or 1981.

== Queen's Commendation for Brave Conduct ==
- Roger Keith Millard – constable, New Zealand Police, Haast.
- Kevin Murray Hallett – of Alexandra.

For services on 14 November 1980 when they went to the assistance of the pilot and two passengers of a helicopter which had crashed into a tree in the Arawhata River valley.

- Frederick Fowler – of Nelson.

For services on 30 December 1980, at Rabbit Island, Nelson, when he struggled with an emotionally disturbed armed man to rescue a young girl who had been abducted and raped. Had it not been for Mr Fowler's intervention the girl would have been murdered.

- Anthony Claude Wilson – police liaison officer, Customs Department, Wellington.

For services on 18 March 1981 in assisting the Police in securing the arrest of a drug dealer. Despite being struck by a baseball bat he restrained the offender and prevented further assault and possible injury to fellow officers. As a result of injuries sustained he suffered the loss of sight in one eye.

- Kevin John Truman – constable, New Zealand Police, Taihape.
- Paul Fannin – formerly of Wanganui Aero Work, Taihape, now of Queensland, Australia.

For services on 25 March 1981 when they went to the site of a crashed RNZAF Skyhawk. The area was heavily forested and exceptionally rugged, and in attempting to establish if the Skyhawk pilot was alive, they placed themselves at great risk and displayed considerable courage.

== Queen's Commendation for Valuable Service in the Air ==
- Douglas Mackenzie Maxwell – of Alexandra.

For services on 14 November 1980, as the pilot of the helicopter which went to the assistance of the pilot and two passengers of a helicopter which had crashed into a tree in the Arawhata River valley.
