= Whirinaki Te Pua-a-Tāne Conservation Park =

Conservation park in New Zealand

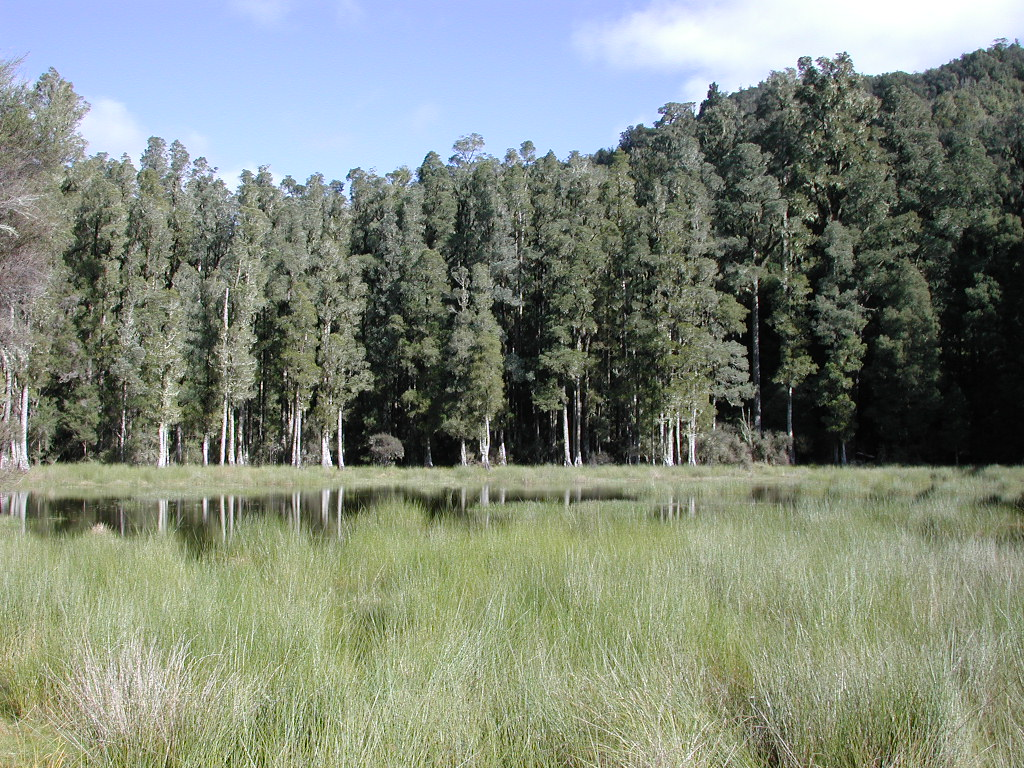
- Arohaki Lagoon

- Location within New Zealand
- Location: North Island, New Zealand
- Nearest town: Rotorua
- Coordinates: 38°40′S 176°41′E
- Area: 65,000 hectares (160,000 acres)
- Governing body: Department of Conservation

Whirinaki Te Pua-a-Tāne Conservation Park is a publicly accessible conservation park in the North Island of New Zealand. The park is centered on the town of Minginui and part of the eastern boundary flanks Te Urewera. The Whirinaki Forest is one of the world's last prehistoric rainforests.

The Department of Conservation is responsible for administering the 562 km^{2} (217 sq mi) park jointly with the local iwi, Ngāti Whare. Tramping is a popular recreation in the park and there is a network of 175 km of tracks and 9 huts that are used for this purpose.

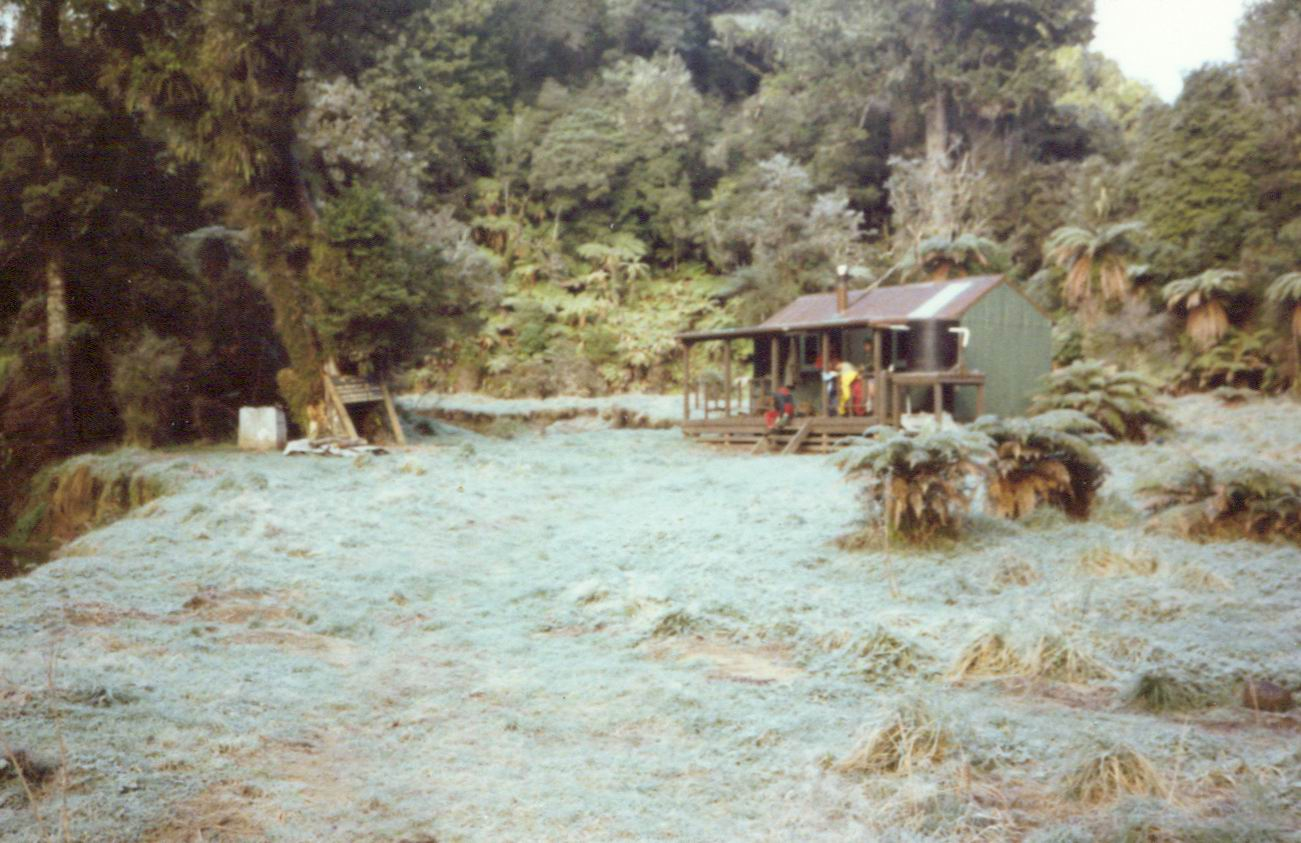
Mangamate Hut, one of the backcountry huts in the park

The unsealed River Road provides access to a carpark and the starting point of many walks. Short walks lead through native bush to Waiatiu Falls, Arohaki Lagoon, Te Whaiti-Nui-A-Toi Canyon, and Whirinaki Falls, respectively. The rain-fed Arohaki Lagoon is often alive with Southern Bell Frogs. Longer tramping tracks connect several huts and two other access roads.

The forests were a focus of protests over logging in the 1970s and 80s. Large parts of the park remain covered in native podocarp forest featuring rimu, tōtara, kahikatea, mataī (Prumnopitys taxifolia), and miro. Some higher parts contain beech forest. The forest supports a wide range of birds, some of which are endangered.

Whirinaki is the location of Nga Hua a Tane, a radical place based research programme on rainforests and the ecosystem services they provide to support life on our planet, led by the local school, Te Kura Toitu o Te Whaiti Nui-a-Toi and its community.

In 2010, a co-governance agreement was signed with Ngati Whare as part of a treaty settlement. As part of the settlement, the New Zealand government apologised for past injustices and acknowledged the park was integral to Ngati Whare's cultural identity and wellbeing. The settlement provided for a joint Ngati Whare and Crown regeneration project, which aimed to regenerate 640ha of exotic pine adjacent to the park back to the indigenous podocarp forest, with David Bellamy as a patron. The park's name was changed from Whirinaki Forest Park to Whirinaki Te Pua-a-Tāne Conservation Park. Whirinaki Te Pua-a-Tāne means the abundance of Tāne.

== Moerangi Mountain Bike Track ==
The Moerangi Track is a dual purpose track for mountain bikers and trampers located in the Whirinaki Te Pu-a-Tane Conservation Park.

The track is 35 km of Grade 3 (intermediate) mountain bike track and takes around 5 to 6 hours to complete for someone with medium to high level of fitness.

Situated along the track are three huts, Skips, Rogers and Moerangi. All three spots are a good stopping point for riders or a place to stay on an overnight ride.

== See also ==
- Tāne, God of forests and birds in Māori mythology.
- Conservation parks of New Zealand
- Conservation in New Zealand
