= Chief of Air Force (New Zealand) =

Head of the Royal New Zealand Air Force

- Incumbent; Darryn Webb since 2 October 2023
- Style: Air Vice Marshal
- Member of: New Zealand Defence Force
- Reports to: Chief of Defence Force
- Term length: Three years (renewable)
- Inaugural holder: Group Captain Ralph Cochrane
- Formation: 1 April 1937

Chief of Air Force (CAF) is the most senior appointment in the Royal New Zealand Air Force, responsible to the Chief of Defence Force. The post was originally known as the Chief of the Air Staff.

== Appointees ==
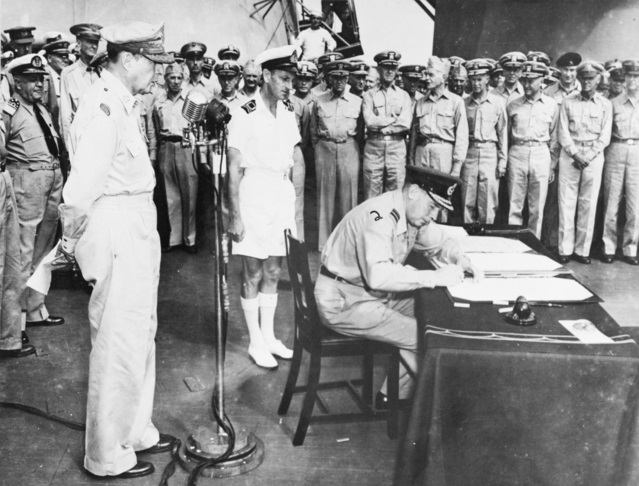
Air Vice Marshal Sir Leonard Isitt, representing New Zealand, accepts the Japanese surrender on 2 September 1945

This along with the * (asterisk) indicates that the individual was subsequently promoted to air marshal and appointed Chief of Defence Force.

The following list chronologically records those who have held the post of Chief of Air Force or its preceding positions, with rank and honours as at the completion of the individual's term.

| Rank | Name | Postnominals | Service | Term began | Term ended |
|---|---|---|---|---|---|
Chief of the Air Staff
| Group Captain | Ralph Cochrane | CBE, AFC | RAF | 1 April 1937 | 24 February 1939 |
| Group Captain | Hugh Saunders | CBE, MC, DFC & Bar, MM | RAF | 25 February 1939 | 28 September 1941 |
| Air Commodore | Victor Goddard | CB, CBE | RAF | 29 September 1941 | 18 July 1943 |
| Air Vice-Marshal | Sir Leonard Isitt | KBE | RNZAF | 19 July 1943 | May 1946 |
| Air Vice-Marshal | Sir Arthur Nevill | KBE, CB | RNZAF | May 1946 | January 1951 |
| Air Vice-Marshal | David Carnegie | CB, CBE, AFC | RAF | January 1951 | 22 February 1954 |
| Air Vice-Marshal | Walter Merton | CB, OBE | RAF | 23 February 1954 | 4 June 1956 |
| Air Vice-Marshal | Cyrus Kay | CB, CBE, DFC | RNZAF | 5 June 1956 | 30 June 1958 |
| Air Vice-Marshal | Malcolm Calder | CB, CBE | RNZAF | 1 July 1958 | November 1962 |
| Air Vice-Marshal | Ian Morrison | CB, CBE | RNZAF | November 1962 | July 1966 |
| Air Vice-Marshal | Cameron Turner | CB, CBE | RNZAF | July 1966 | July 1969 |
| Air Vice-Marshal | William Stratton | CB, CBE, DFC & Bar | RNZAF | July 1969 | July 1971 |
| Air Vice-Marshal | Douglas St George | CB, CBE, DFC, AFC | RNZAF | July 1971 | September 1974 |
| Air Vice-Marshal | Richard Bolt* | CB, CBE, DFC, AFC | RNZAF | September 1974 | October 1976 |
| Air Vice-Marshal | Larry Siegert | CB, CBE, MVO, DFC, AFC | RNZAF | October 1976 | October 1979 |
| Air Vice-Marshal | Ewan Jamieson* | CB, OBE | RNZAF | October 1979 | April 1983 |
| Air Vice-Marshal | David Crooks* | CB, OBE | RNZAF | April 1983 | October 1986 |
| Air Vice-Marshal | Patrick Neville | CB, CBE, AFC | RNZAF | October 1986 | 1988 |
| Air Vice-Marshal | Peter Adamson | CB, OBE | RNZAF | 1988 | 1992 |
| Air Vice-Marshal | John Hosie | CB, OBE | RNZAF | 1992 | September 1995 |
| Air Vice-Marshal | Carey Adamson* | CNZM, AFC | RNZAF | September 1995 | 24 February 1999 |
| Air Vice-Marshal | Don Hamilton | OBE | RNZAF | 25 February 1999 | 24 February 2002 |
Chief of Air Force
| Air Vice-Marshal | John Hamilton | ONZM, MVO | RNZAF | 25 February 2002 | 30 April 2006 |
| Air Vice-Marshal | Graham Lintott | ONZM | RNZAF | 1 May 2006 | 30 April 2011 |
| Air Vice-Marshal | Peter Stockwell | ONZM, AFC | RNZAF | 1 May 2011 | 30 April 2014 |
| Air Vice-Marshal | Mike Yardley | DSD | RNZAF | 1 May 2014 | 22 March 2016 |
| Air Vice-Marshal | Tony Davies* | MNZM | RNZAF | 23 March 2016 | 9 September 2018 |
| Air Vice-Marshal | Andrew Clark | | RNZAF | 10 September 2018 | 2 October 2023 |
| Air Vice-Marshal | Darryn Webb | MNZM | RNZAF | 2 October 2023 | Incumbent |
