= Ngāti Whare =

Māori iwi (tribe) in Aotearoa New Zealand

- Iwi (tribe) in Māoridom
- Population: 3,560

Ngāti Whare is a Māori iwi of New Zealand. It is part of a group of tribes participating in the "treelords" Treaty of Waitangi settlement with the New Zealand government involving Central North Island forestry land and cash.

As part of the Ngāti Whare Claims Settlement Act 2012 the government signed a co-governance agreement for the Whirinaki Te Pua-a-Tāne Conservation Park with Ngati Whare. The government apologised for past injustices and acknowledged the forest was integral to Ngati Whare's cultural identity and wellbeing. The settlement provided for a joint Ngati Whare and Crown ecological regeneration project.

== Hapū and marae ==
=== Hapū ===
The following hapū (sub-tribes) are associated with Ngāti Whare:

- Ngāti Hāmua ki Te Whaiti
- Ngāti Kohiwi
- Ngāti Māhanga
- Ngāti Te Au
- Ngāti Te Karaha
- Ngāti Tuahiwi
- Ngāti Whare ki Ngā Pōtiki
- Warahoe ki Te Whaiti

=== Marae ===
The following marae (communal grounds) and wharenui (meeting houses) are associated with Ngāti Whare:

- Murumurunga marae and Wharepakau wharenui at Te Whaiti
- Waikotikoti marae and Hinenuitepo wharenui

== Governance ==
=== Te Runanga o Ngāti Whare ===
Te Runanga o Ngāti Whare is the governing trust of the tribe. The common law trust is governed by seven trustees from iwi whānui elected at Hui-a-Iwi. It is based at Murupara. It also represents the tribe during resource consent consultation under the Resource Management Act.

The organisation manages the tribe's Treaty of Waitangi settlement under the Ngāti Whare Claims Settlement Act of 2012, and its interests in the Central North Island forestry settlement, under the Central North Island Forests Land Collective Settlement of 2008. The trust represents the tribe's interests in fisheries under the Māori Fisheries Act and Māori Commercial Aquaculture Claims Settlement Act.

=== Local government ===
The tribal area of Ngāti Whare is within the territory of Whakatāne District Council.

It is within the boundary of Bay of Plenty Regional Council.

== Notable people ==
- Suzanne Pitama, indigenous health researcher

== See also ==
- List of Māori iwi
