= Minginui =

- Town
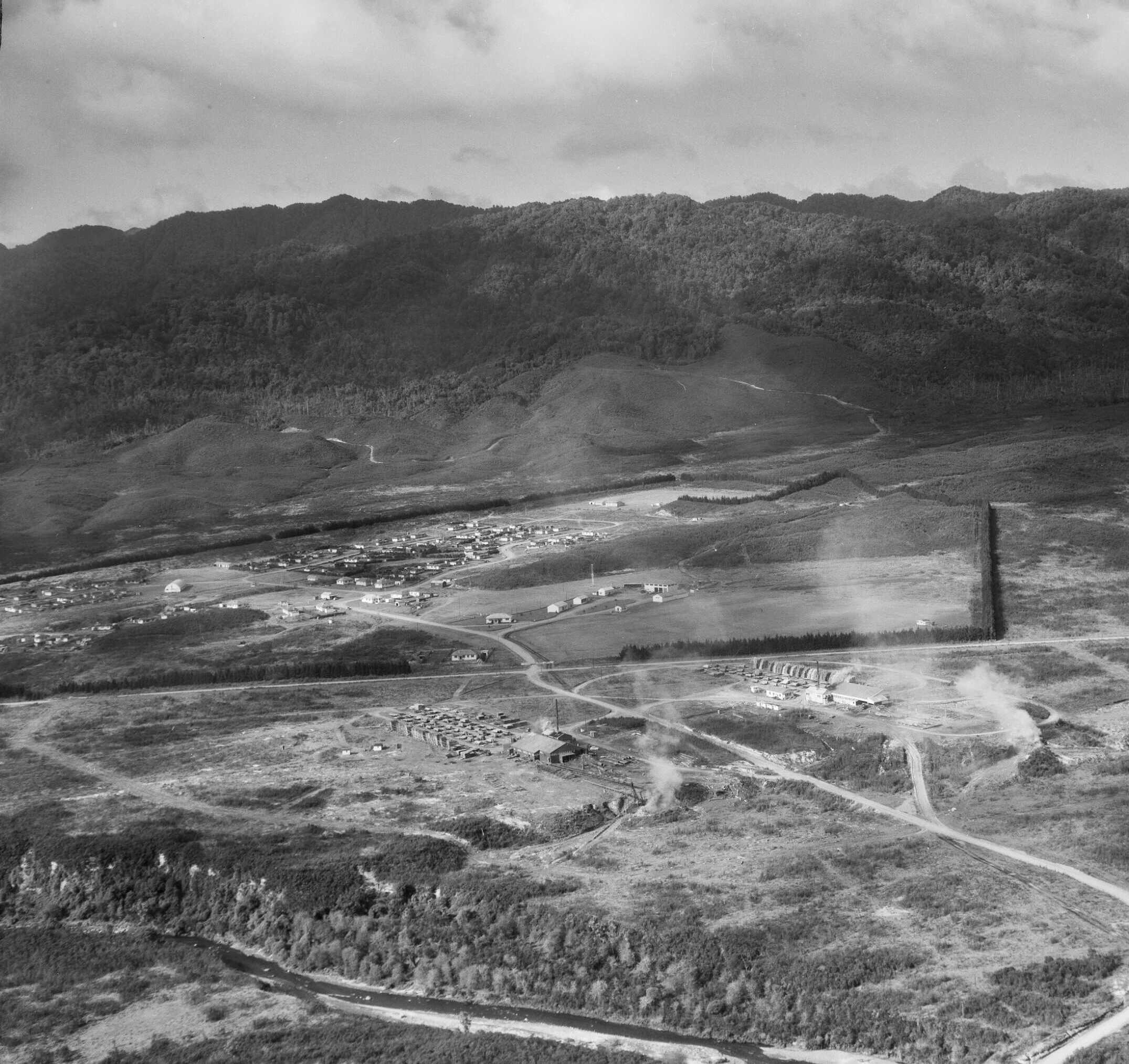
- Aerial view of Minginui in 1958
- Interactive map of Minginui
- Coordinates: 38.642°S 176.733°E
- Country: New Zealand
- Region: Bay of Plenty
- Territorial authority: Whakatāne District
- Ward: Te Uruwera General Ward
- Community: Murupara Community
- Electorates: East Cape; Waiariki (Māori)

Government
  - Territorial authority: Whakatāne District Council
  - Regional council: Bay of Plenty Regional Council
  - Mayor of Whakatāne: Nándor Tánczos
  - East Cape MP: Dana Kirkpatrick
  - Waiariki MP: Rawiri Waititi

Area
  - Total: 0.88 km^{2} (0.34 sq mi)

Population (2023 Census)
  - Total: 168
  - Density: 190/km^{2} (490/sq mi)

Minginui is a town in Whakatāne District and Bay of Plenty Region on New Zealand's North Island.

The Whirinaki Te Pua-a-Tāne Conservation Park is located near the town.

In 1978, there was confrontation between the local community and conservationists over native forest logging in the park, then known as Whirinaki State Forest. Four bus loads of conservationists arrived in Minginui from an ECO conference being held in Taupō. The local residents barricaded the road leading to the forest preventing a planned bush walk.

== Demographics ==
Stats NZ describes Minginui as a rural settlement, which covers 0.88 km^{2} (0.34 sq mi). It is part of the Galatea statistical area.

Historical population
Year	Pop.	±% p.a.
2013	135	—
2018	147	+1.72%
2023	168	+2.71%

Minginui had a population of 168 in the 2023 New Zealand census, an increase of 21 people (14.3%) since the 2018 census, and an increase of 33 people (24.4%) since the 2013 census. There were 90 males and 78 females in 39 dwellings. The median age was 32.9 years (compared with 38.1 years nationally). There were 39 people (23.2%) aged under 15 years, 36 (21.4%) aged 15 to 29, 75 (44.6%) aged 30 to 64, and 21 (12.5%) aged 65 or older.

People could identify as more than one ethnicity. The results were 21.4% European (Pākehā), 92.9% Māori, and 10.7% Pasifika. English was spoken by 96.4%, and Māori by 44.6%. No language could be spoken by 3.6% (e.g. too young to talk). New Zealand Sign Language was known by 1.8%. The percentage of people born overseas was 1.8, compared with 28.8% nationally.

Religious affiliations were 25.0% Christian, 1.8% Hindu, and 17.9% Māori religious beliefs. People who answered that they had no religion were 51.8%, and 7.1% of people did not answer the census question.

Of those at least 15 years old, 12 (9.3%) people had a bachelor's or higher degree, 57 (44.2%) had a post-high school certificate or diploma, and 60 (46.5%) people exclusively held high school qualifications. The median income was $28,000, compared with $41,500 nationally. 3 people (2.3%) earned over $100,000 compared to 12.1% nationally. The employment status of those at least 15 was 54 (41.9%) full-time, 12 (9.3%) part-time, and 9 (7.0%) unemployed.

== Climate ==
Climate data for Minginui, elevation 366 m (1,201 ft), (1971–1989 normals, extremes 1953–1989)
Month	Jan	Feb	Mar	Apr	May	Jun	Jul	Aug	Sep	Oct	Nov	Dec	Year
Record high °C (°F)	34.5 (94.1)	32.6 (90.7)	29.6 (85.3)	26.1 (79.0)	23.5 (74.3)	18.2 (64.8)	19.0 (66.2)	19.8 (67.6)	22.5 (72.5)	28.2 (82.8)	29.0 (84.2)	31.3 (88.3)	34.5 (94.1)
Mean maximum °C (°F)	29.7 (85.5)	28.9 (84.0)	25.8 (78.4)	22.6 (72.7)	18.3 (64.9)	16.4 (61.5)	15.3 (59.5)	16.9 (62.4)	19.0 (66.2)	22.9 (73.2)	25.5 (77.9)	27.2 (81.0)	30.3 (86.5)
Mean daily maximum °C (°F)	23.6 (74.5)	23.2 (73.8)	21.2 (70.2)	18.0 (64.4)	14.3 (57.7)	12.2 (54.0)	11.6 (52.9)	12.7 (54.9)	14.7 (58.5)	17.1 (62.8)	19.7 (67.5)	21.7 (71.1)	17.5 (63.5)
Daily mean °C (°F)	17.0 (62.6)	17.0 (62.6)	15.2 (59.4)	11.8 (53.2)	8.2 (46.8)	6.7 (44.1)	6.0 (42.8)	7.1 (44.8)	9.0 (48.2)	11.3 (52.3)	13.7 (56.7)	15.5 (59.9)	11.5 (52.8)
Mean daily minimum °C (°F)	10.4 (50.7)	10.7 (51.3)	9.1 (48.4)	5.6 (42.1)	2.0 (35.6)	1.1 (34.0)	0.3 (32.5)	1.4 (34.5)	3.2 (37.8)	5.4 (41.7)	7.6 (45.7)	9.3 (48.7)	5.5 (41.9)
Mean minimum °C (°F)	2.1 (35.8)	2.2 (36.0)	−0.8 (30.6)	−2.5 (27.5)	−5.5 (22.1)	−6.6 (20.1)	−6.9 (19.6)	−5.9 (21.4)	−4.1 (24.6)	−2.9 (26.8)	−0.8 (30.6)	1.4 (34.5)	−8.2 (17.2)
Record low °C (°F)	−1.1 (30.0)	−5.0 (23.0)	−5.0 (23.0)	−7.0 (19.4)	−12.0 (10.4)	−10.5 (13.1)	−10.7 (12.7)	−9.2 (15.4)	−8.1 (17.4)	−7.8 (18.0)	−5.4 (22.3)	−3.5 (25.7)	−12.0 (10.4)
Average rainfall mm (inches)	146.7 (5.78)	77.1 (3.04)	114.0 (4.49)	82.4 (3.24)	100.1 (3.94)	129.7 (5.11)	91.0 (3.58)	97.7 (3.85)	114.7 (4.52)	119.9 (4.72)	95.2 (3.75)	138.0 (5.43)	1,306.5 (51.45)
Source: NIWA (rainfall 1991–2020)
