= Richard Bolt (RNZAF officer) =

Royal New Zealand Air Force officer (1923–2014)

Sir Richard Bolt
- Born: 16 July 1923; Auckland, New Zealand
- Died: 27 July 2014 (aged 91); Lower Hutt, New Zealand
- Military career
- Allegiance: New Zealand
- Branch: Royal New Zealand Air Force
- Service years: 1942–1980
- Rank: Air Marshal
- Commands: Chief of the Defence Staff (1976–80); Chief of the Air Staff (1974–76); No. 24 Squadron (1955–57); No. 40 Squadron (1954–55)
- Conflicts: Second World War
- Awards: Knight Commander of the Order of the British Empire; Companion of the Order of the Bath; Distinguished Flying Cross; Air Force Cross

Air Marshal Sir Richard Bruce Bolt, KBE, CB, DFC, AFC (16 July 1923 – 27 July 2014) was a bomber pilot in the Second World War and a senior Royal New Zealand Air Force officer in the post-war years. He was Chief of the Air Staff from 1974 to 1976 and Chief of the Defence Staff from 1976 to 1980, when he retired from the military.

== Early life and career ==
Born at the Kelvin maternity home in Auckland in 1923, Bolt was educated at Nelson College from 1936 to 1939. His father was the pioneering New Zealand aviator George Bolt.

During the Second World War, Bolt served with the Pathfinder Force, flying the Avro Lancaster bomber. He captained a Lancaster during Operation Manna, dropping food to the Netherlands in 1945. After the War, Bolt held two different squadron commands as the Commanding Officer of No. 40 Squadron RNZAF and No. 24 (Commonwealth) Squadron RAF.

During the ANZUS crisis of 1984–85, Bolt was one of 16 senior retired officers and civil servants who wrote protesting the Fourth Labour Government's anti-nuclear policy. They were later referred to by David Lange as the "geriatric generals".

Bolt part-owned a racehorse, Kotare Chief, which won the 1987 Auckland Cup as a nine-year-old, at Ellerslie. David Lange was on hand to present the cup to Bolt who commented, "Not bad for a geriatric".

Bolt died in Lower Hutt on 27 July 2014 at the age of 91. He was regarded as the Father of the Air Force.

== Honours and awards ==
Bolt was award the Distinguished Flying Cross in 1945. In the 1959 Queen's Birthday Honours, the then Squadron Leader Bolt was awarded the Air Force Cross. In the 1977 New Year Honours, he was appointed a Companion of the Order of the Bath. In the 1973 Queen's Birthday Honours, Bolt was appointed a Commander of the Order of the British Empire, and he was elevated to Knight Commander of the Order of the British Empire in the 1979 Queen's Birthday Honours. In 1977, Bolt was awarded the Queen Elizabeth II Silver Jubilee Medal.

Military offices
Preceded by Lieutenant General Sir Richard Webb	Chief of the Defence Staff; 1976–1980	Succeeded by Vice Admiral Sir Neil Anderson
Preceded by Air Vice Marshal Douglas St George	Chief of the Air Staff; 1974–1976	Succeeded by Air Vice Marshal Larry Siegert
