= David Crooks (RNZAF officer) =

New Zealand air force officer (1931–2022)

- Born: 8 December 1931; Rangiora, New Zealand
- Died: 9 March 2022 (aged 90); Wellington, New Zealand
- Military career
- Allegiance: New Zealand
- Branch: Royal New Zealand Air Force
- Service years: c.1950–1987
- Rank: Air Marshal
- Service number: C300083
- Commands: Chief of the Defence Staff; Chief of the Air Staff
- Awards: Companion of the Order of the Bath; Officer of the Order of the British Empire

Air Marshal David Manson Crooks, CB, OBE (8 December 1931 – 9 March 2022) was a senior commander of the Royal New Zealand Air Force. He was Chief of the Air Staff from April 1983 to October 1986 and Chief of the Defence Staff thereafter until 1987 when he retired.

Crooks was appointed an Officer of the Order of the British Empire in the 1969 Queen's Birthday Honours, and a Companion of the Order of the Bath in the 1985 New Year Honours.

Crooks retired from the Royal New Zealand Air Force in 1987. In retirement he served on the board of the RNZAF Museum Trust. He died in Wellington on 9 March 2022, at the age of 90.

Military offices
Preceded by Air Marshal Sir Ewan Jamieson	Chief of the Defence Staff; 1986–1987	Succeeded by Lieutenant General Sir John Mace
Preceded by Air Vice Marshal Ewan Jamieson	Chief of the Air Staff; 1983–1986	Succeeded by Air Vice Marshal Patrick Neville
