= HMNZS Wellington (P55) =

Patrol vessel

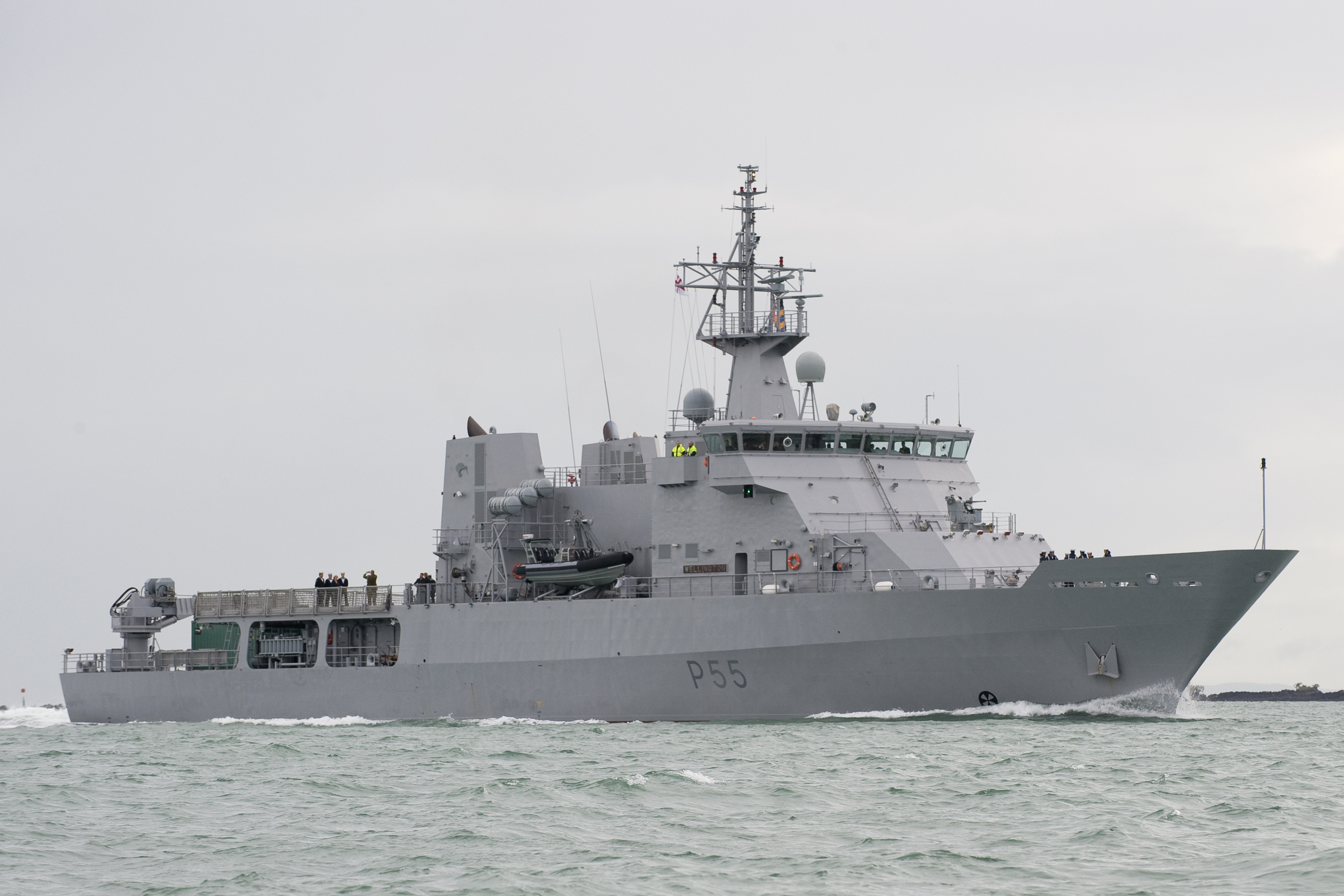
- HMNZS Wellington first arrival into Devonport Naval Base, June 2010

History

New Zealand
- Name: Wellington
- Ordered: 29 July 2004
- Builder: Tenix
- Acquired: 6 May 2010
- Home port: Wellington
- Identification: IMO number: 9368481; MMSI number: 512159000; Callsign: ZMFS
- Status: Laid up as of 2022

General characteristics
- Class & type: Protector-class offshore patrol vessel
- Displacement: 1,900 tonnes
- Length: 85 m (278 ft 10 in)
- Beam: 14 m (45 ft 11 in)
- Draught: 3.6 m (11 ft 10 in)
- Propulsion: 2 × MAN B&W 12RK280 diesel engines, each with a continuous rating of 5,400 kW (7,200 hp) at 1,000 rpm
- Speed: 22 knots (41 km/h; 25 mph)
- Range: 6,000 nmi (11,000 km; 6,900 mi)
- Boats & landing craft carried: 2 × RHIB (7.74 m) or; 1 × special forces RHIB (11 m)
- Capacity: 30 passengers; 1 × sea container; 1 × 15 tonne crane aft
- Complement: 35 + 10 flight personnel + 4 personnel from Government agencies
- Sensors & processing systems: Optical fire control
- Armament: 1 × remote controlled Rafael Typhoon 25 mm stabilised naval gun; 2 × M2HB .50 calibre machine guns
- Aircraft carried: 1 × SH-2G Super Seasprite helicopter

HMNZS Wellington (P55) is a Protector-class offshore patrol vessel in the Royal New Zealand Navy (RNZN).

== History ==
The ship was built by Tenix as part of the New Zealand government's Royal New Zealand Navy plans, and was originally expected to enter service during the winter of 2008. However, in late 2008, it became known that the vessel was considered "non-compliant", and did not fulfill a number of specifications, such as being 100 tonnes over its design weight, resulting in revisions to its operating conditions during Antarctic duties. The future crew that was already stationed with the vessel was sent back to New Zealand after the ship returned to Melbourne, until the dispute with the contractor was resolved. The ship is named in honour of HMNZS Wellington (F69), a Leander-class frigate serving in the Royal New Zealand Navy from 1982 until 1999.

Wellington was accepted into the Royal New Zealand Navy on 6 May 2010 and arrived at the Devonport (Auckland) Naval Base the following month. The ship was also involved in the search for the crewmembers of the 47-foot (14 m) yacht Berserk in 2012, but had to turn back due to the weather which the captain called the worst storm he had ever seen in 19 years. During that mission the ship lost three 50-person life rafts of which one was discovered by the Sea Shepherd Conservation Society vessel MY Steve Irwin.

On 14 January 2015 Wellington intercepted three fishing vessels, Songhua Kunlun and YongDing, which were allegedly fishing illegally in Antarctic waters. The fishing vessels refused to be boarded and poor weather and sea conditions prevented Wellington from forcing the issue.

Wellington was involved in seabed surveys off Kaikōura after the 2016 Kaikōura earthquake.

On 19 July 2021 HMNZS Wellington delivered 120 vials of the Pfizer–BioNTech COVID-19 vaccine to Tokelau's Nukunonu atoll, which is sufficient to vaccinate 720 people.

Wellington was deployed to the Solomon Islands following the unrest after the Solomon Islands switched their diplomatic recognition from Taiwan to China in November 2021. The ship relieved HMAS Armidale (ACPB 83) and conducted presence patrols to dissuade illegal smuggling and to assist the Royal Solomon Islands Police Force in moving throughout the archipelago.

In response to the 2022 Hunga Tonga–Hunga Ha'apai eruption and tsunami, Wellington, HMNZS Aotearoa, and HMNZS Canterbury were deployed to provide water supplies, survey teams, and helicopter support.

Wellington was laid up in late 2022 due to staff shortages in the RNZN.

== Upgrades ==
Both HMNZS Otago and HMNZS Wellington have recently gone through minor upgrades, including sensors and weapons, and replacing the 25 mm Bushmaster with the Rafael Typhoon 25 mm stabilised naval gun. Full compatibility trials with the updated Seasprite SH2G1(l)s, ex-RAN were conducted in 2016 and the much more capable helicopters are now deployed from Otago and Wellington with enhanced lift, surveillance and standoff Penguin missiles, offering a beyond horizon deterrent.

== See also ==
- Patrol boats of the Royal New Zealand Navy
