= HMNZS Otago (P148) =

New Zealand Navy patrol vessel

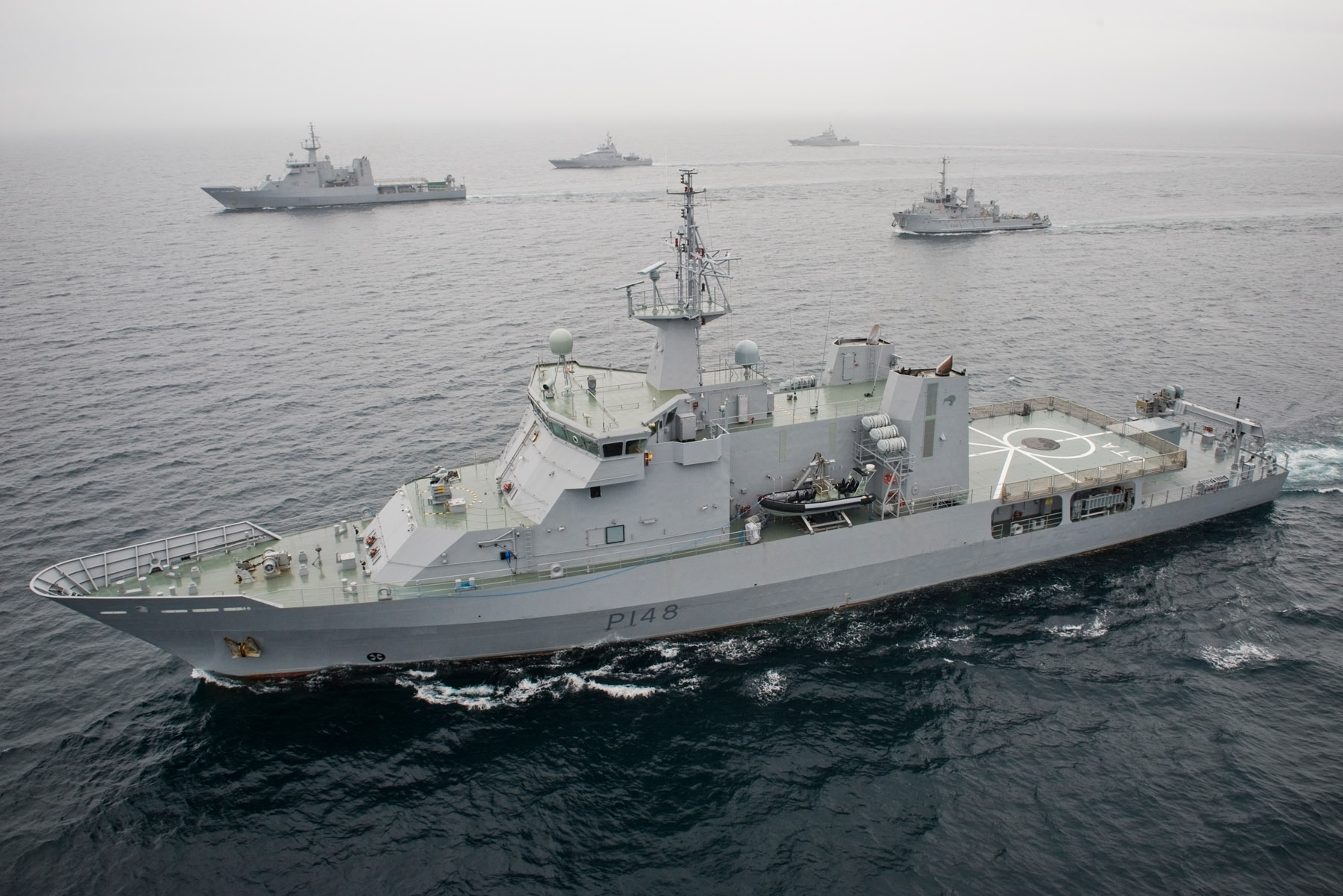
- HMNZS Otago (fore) among other Royal New Zealand Navy vessels

History

New Zealand
- Name: Otago
- Namesake: Province of Otago
- Ordered: 29 July 2004
- Builder: Tenix
- Laid down: December 2005
- Launched: 18 November 2006
- Home port: Port Chalmers, Dunedin
- Identification: IMO number: 9368479; MMSI number: 512155000; Callsign: ZMKF
- Status: Laid up as of 2022; undergoing reactivation as of 2026

General characteristics
- Class & type: Protector-class offshore patrol vessel
- Displacement: 1900 tonnes
- Length: 85 m (279 ft)
- Beam: 14 m (46 ft)
- Draught: 3.6 m (12 ft)
- Propulsion: 2 × MAN B&W 12RK280 diesel engines with a continuous rating of 5,400 kW at 1,000 rpm
- Speed: Baseline speed 22 knots (41 km/h); Economical speed 12 knots (22 km/h); Loiter speed 4–10 knots (7.4–18.5 km/h)
- Range: 6,000 nautical miles (11,000 km)
- Boats & landing craft carried: 2 × RHIB (7.74m) or; 1 × special forces RHIB (11m)
- Capacity: 30 passengers; 1 × sea container; 1 × 15 tonne crane aft
- Complement: 35 + 10 flight personnel + 4 personnel from Government agencies
- Sensors & processing systems: Optical fire control
- Armament: 1 × remote controlled Rafael Typhoon 25 mm stabilised naval gun; 2 × M2HB .50 calibre machine guns; Small arms
- Armour: None
- Aircraft carried: 1 × SH-2G Super Seasprite helicopter

HMNZS Otago (P148) is a Protector-class offshore patrol vessel in service with the Royal New Zealand Navy.

== Development ==
The development of the OPV design based on an Irish Naval Service OPV class was very contentious, with the RNZN arguing for the need for a limited combat suite for effective training and patrol work with a 57 mm–76 mm light frigate gun and associated fire control, radar and electronic warfare systems at least compatible with current 2nd light RN OPVs. The government and Cabinet preference was to use the space and extra finance available to incorporate ice strengthening and provision of extra coastal patrol vessels. The RNZN view was that adding ice strengthening was unnecessary for Southern Ocean patrols, distinct from operations in the Ross Sea, and the extra weight and complexity would stress and shorten the life of the hulls from 25 to 15 years. She was launched in 2006 but suffered from problems during construction and was not commissioned until 2010, two years later than planned. Soon after commissioning Otago encountered problems with both her engines which delayed her arrival at her home port of Port Chalmers. She has served on several lengthy patrols of the Antarctic, though she lacks the capability to operate in heavier levels of ice-coverage which has led to the cancellation of at least one planned operation.

== Name ==
The ship is named in honour of the New Zealand province of Otago, associated with the city of Dunedin. The previous HMNZS Otago (F111), was a Rothesay-class frigate that served in the Royal New Zealand Navy from 1960 until 1983.

== Construction ==
The ship was built by Tenix as part of the New Zealand government's Royal New Zealand Navy plans, and was expected to enter service in late 2008. She was launched in Williamstown, Victoria on 18 November 2006 and sponsored by Dame Silvia Cartwright. The first commanding officer of Otago was Lieutenant Commander Simon Rooke MNZM.

Otago suffered delays in delivery. In late 2008, it became known that the vessel was not considered to meet all contract specifications, and exceeded her design displacement. The initial crew stationed in Melbourne to commission the vessel returned to New Zealand while the build was completed. On 18 February 2010, the ship was accepted into the RNZN after the builders claimed that being slightly overweight would not stop her from patrolling in Antarctic waters. In mid March 2010, the vessel developed problems in both engines during sea trials, and had to limp back into port in Australia, instead of arriving in Auckland as originally planned. HMNZS Otago eventually arrived in Auckland in April 2010, nearly two years after the original target date.

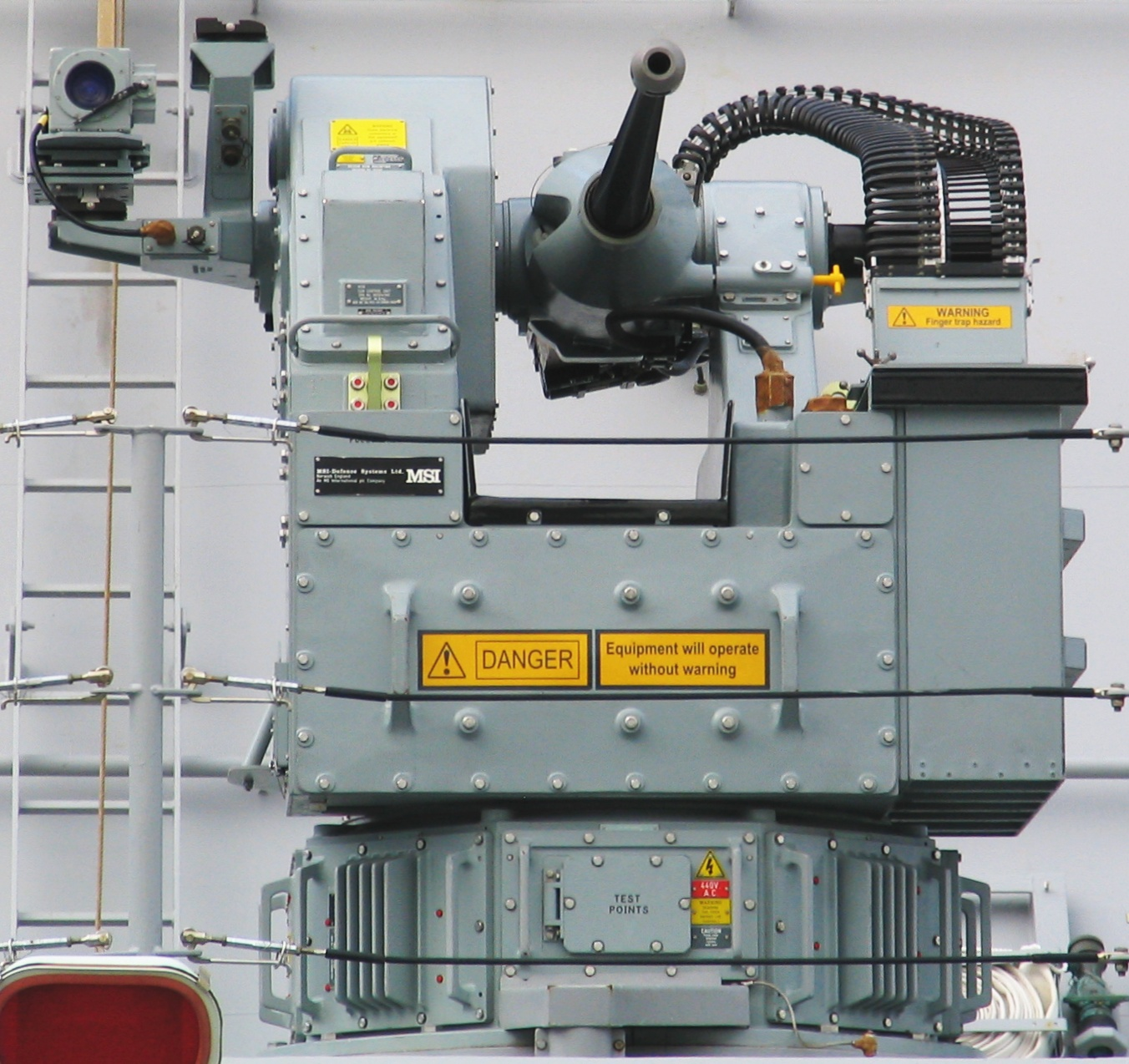
25 mm M242 Bushmaster cannon and remote turret.

== Service ==
HMNZS Otago made her first visit to her home port of Port Chalmers on 22 July 2010. On her maiden voyage Otago encountered trouble when sea water contaminated her bunker fuel. She suffered further technical difficulties in December 2010 during a visit to Campbell Island with her engineers having to make temporary repairs to both engines prior to an early return to Devonport Naval Base for repairs. Governor-General Sir Anand Satyanand and cabinet minister Kate Wilkinson who were on board at the time were transferred to HMNZS Wellington to continue their tour.

Lieutenant-Commander Robert McCaw assumed command of the vessel on 12 September 2012. Since then she has served on lengthy patrols of the Antarctic, though a planned mission to monitor fisheries in the Southern Ocean had to be cancelled because the vessel lacked the capability to operate in that level of ice cover. Her duties have included fisheries protection, conservation and transportation of scientific staff. The scientists carried by Otago discovered 90 new species of seaweed on a single Sub-Antarctic island. The vessel has also conducted two search and rescue operations.

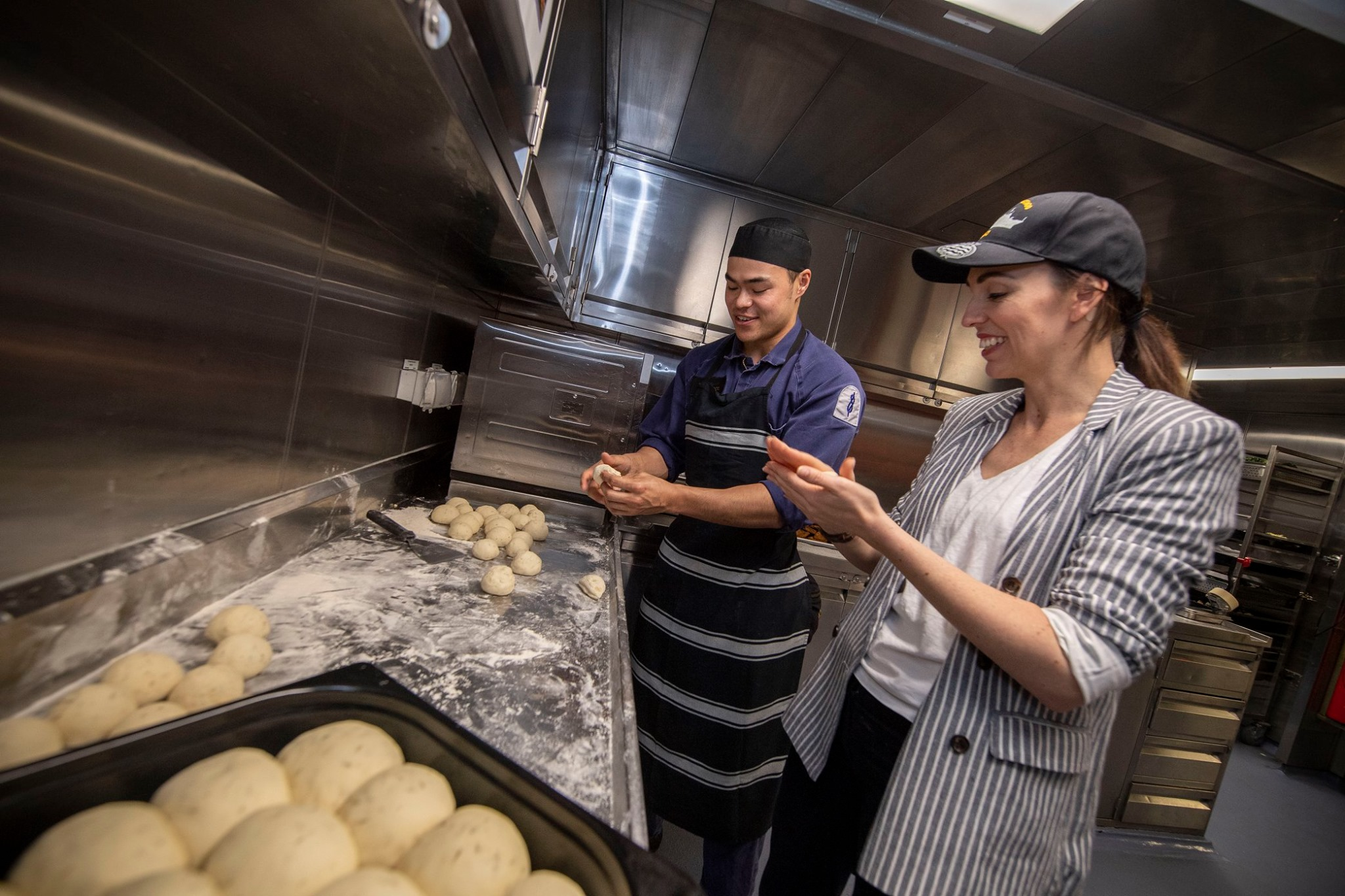
Prime Minister Jacinda Ardern assists the Royal New Zealand Navy chefs on board HMNZS Otago with making bread during her 2019 visit to Tokelau.

In July 2019, Otago embarked Prime Minister Jacinda Ardern and a delegation on a visit to the dependant territory of Tokelau from Samoa. Due to its remoteness this was the first Prime Ministerial trip since 2004, and required the use of Otago to reach and support the trip.

In August 2019 Otago proceeded to Samoa and American Samoa, where she met with the US Coast Guard cutters USCGC Walnut and USCGC Joseph Gerczak. The three vessels worked together as they visited ports together.

In 2022 the Otago was parked up in Devonport Naval Base as the Navy was too low on staff to fully operate the vessel.

In January 2025, it was confirmed that the Otago would be taking on the role of the sunken HMNZS Manawanui. The Otago would be performing the missions that the Manawanui held, though lacking the deck working space and 100 tonne crane.

In 2026 Otago was undergoing process of reactivation.

== Upgrades ==
Both Otago and Wellington have recently gone through minor upgrades, including sensors and weapons, and replacing the 25 mm Bushmaster with the Rafael Typhoon 25 mm stabilised naval gun. Full compatibility trials with the updated Seasprite SH2G1(l)s, ex RAN were conducted in 2016 and the much more capable helicopters are now deployed from Otago and Wellington with enhanced lift, surveillance and standoff Penguin missiles, offering a beyond horizon deterrent.

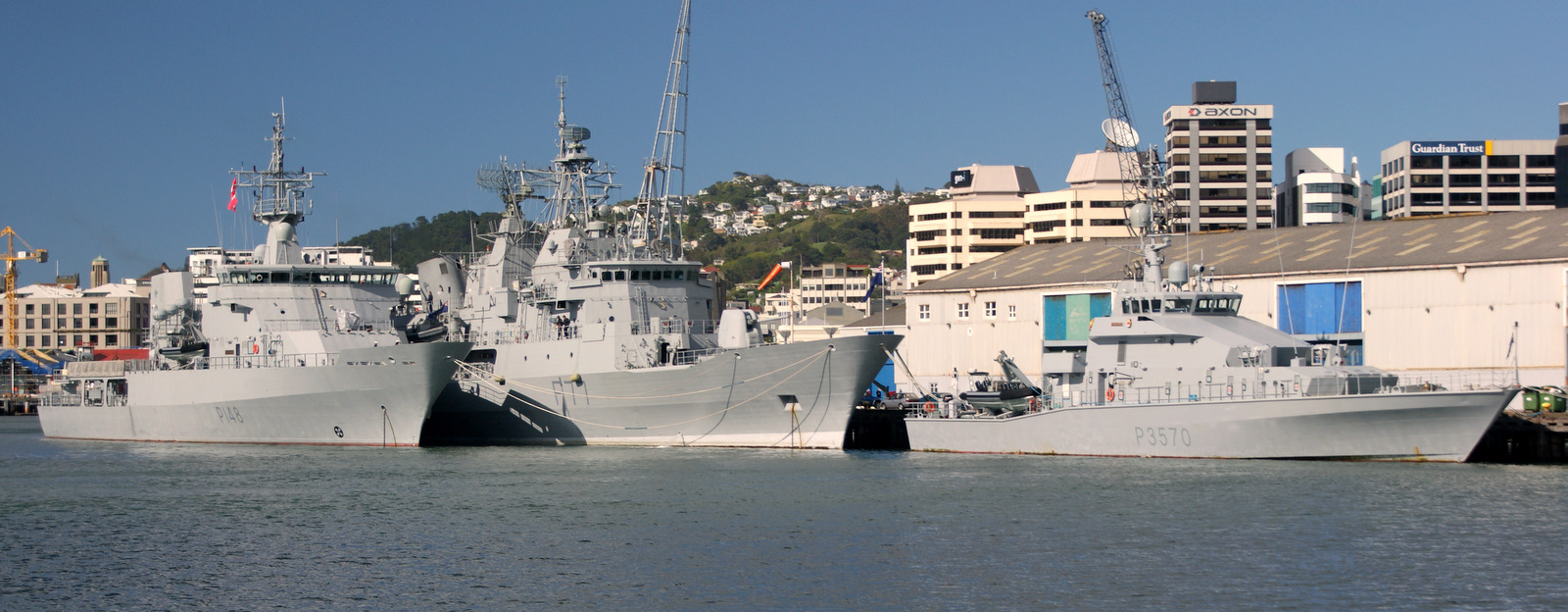
Otago (left) with Te Kaha and Taupo in Wellington, October 2010.

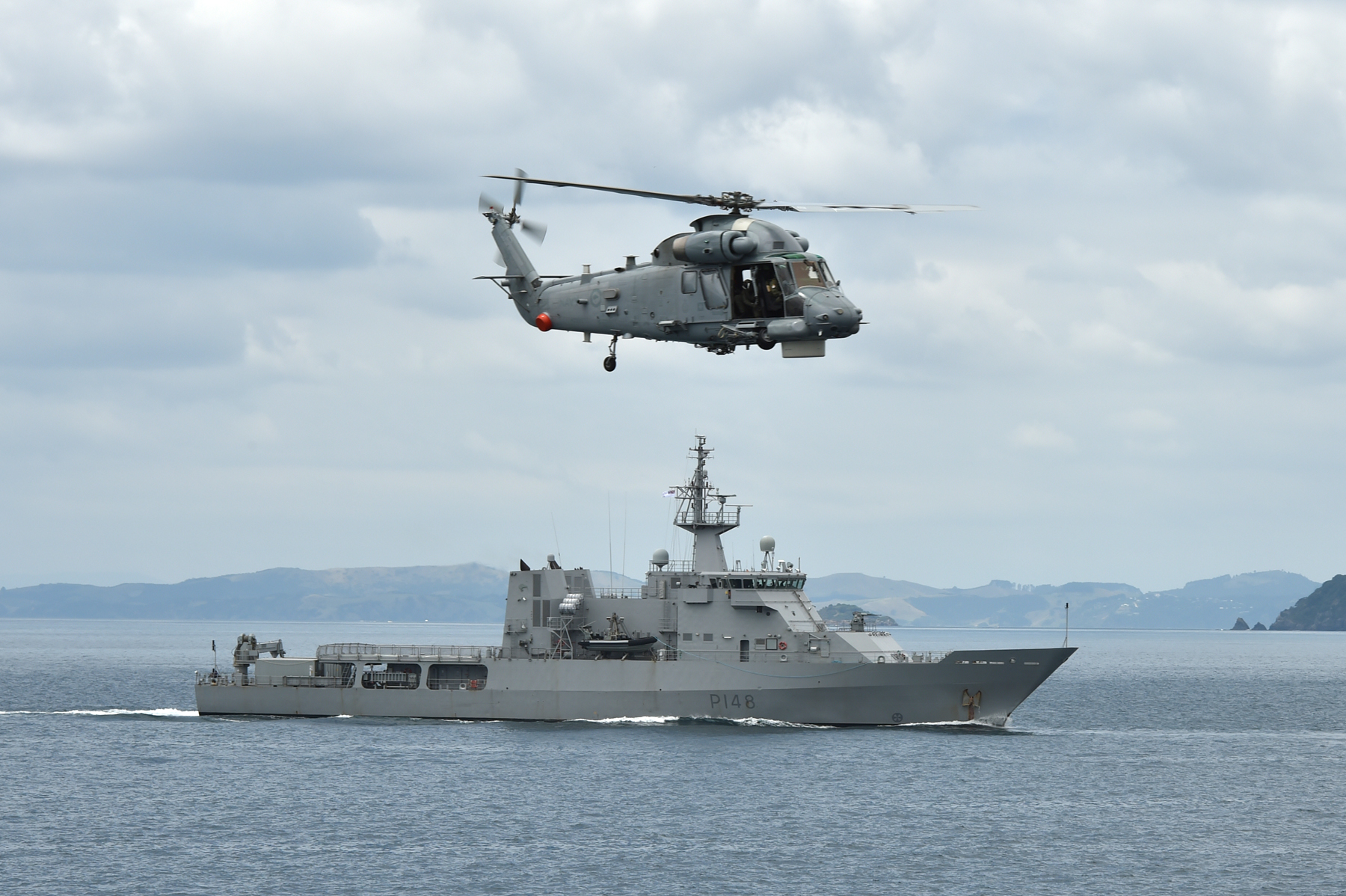
Otago in the Hauraki Gulf with a SH-2G.

== See also ==
- Patrol boats of the Royal New Zealand Navy
