= USCGC Walnut (WLB-205) =

U.S. Coast Guard seagoing buoy tender

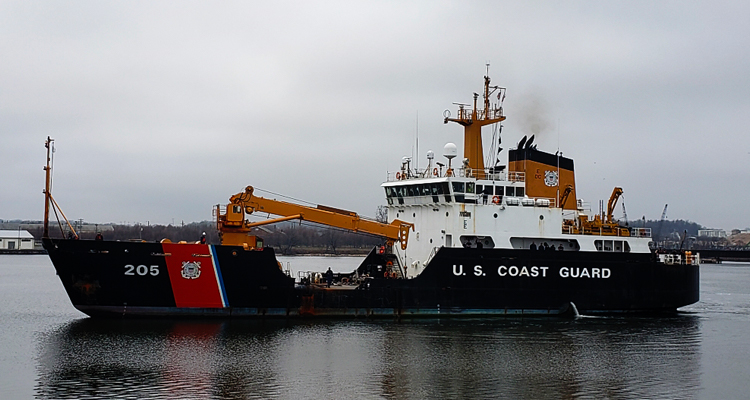
- USCGC Walnut at the Coast Guard Yard in Curtis Bay, Maryland, February 2020

History

United States
- Name: USCGC Walnut (WLB-205)
- Operator: United States Coast Guard
- Builder: Marinette Marine Corporation, Marinette, Wisconsin, U.S.
- Launched: 22 August 1998
- Home port: Pensacola, Florida, U.S.
- Identification: IMO number: 9155573; MMSI number: 366953000; Callsign: NZNE
- Status: in active service
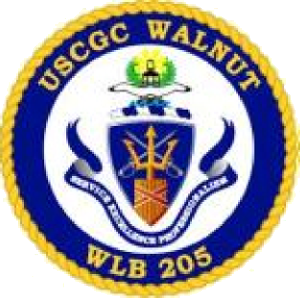
- Badge

General characteristics
- Class & type: Juniper-class seagoing buoy tender
- Displacement: 2,000 tons (full load)
- Length: 225 ft (69 m)
- Beam: 46 ft (14 m)
- Draft: 13 ft (4.0 m)
- Propulsion: 2 x 3,100 hp Caterpillar diesel engines
- Speed: 16 knots
- Complement: 9 officers, 43 enlisted
- Armament: 2 x .50 caliber heavy machine guns; Capable of being equipped with a Mk 38 25 mm chain gun

USCGC Walnut (WLB-205) is the fifth cutter in the Juniper-class 225 ft (69 m) of seagoing buoy tenders and is the second ship to bear the name. She is under the operational control of the Commander of the Coast Guard Oceania District and is home-ported on Sand Island in Honolulu, Hawaii. Her primary area of responsibility is the coastal waters and high seas around the Hawaiian Islands and American Samoa. Walnut conducts heavy lift aids-to-navigation operations, and law enforcement, homeland security, environmental pollution response, and search and rescue as directed.

== Construction and characteristics ==
USCGC Walnut was built by the Marinette Marine Corporation in Wisconsin and launched on 22 August 1998. She has a length of 225 ft (69 m), a beam of 46 ft (14 m), and a draft of 13 ft (4.0 m). Walnut is propelled by two Caterpillar diesel engines rated at 3,100 horsepower, and has a top speed of 16 knots. She has a single controllable-pitch propeller, which along with bow and stern thrusters allow the ship to be maneuvered to set buoys close offshore and in restricted waters. A dynamic global positioning system coupled with machinery plant controls and a chart display and information system allow station-keeping of the ship within a five-meter accuracy of the planned position without human intervention. Walnut is also equipped with an oil-skimming system known as the Spilled Oil Recovery System (SORS) which is used in her mission of maritime environmental protection. The cutter has a 2,875 square foot buoy deck area with a crane used for servicing large ocean buoys.

== Mission ==
Walnut has an area of responsibility within the U.S. Coast Guard Oceania District of approximately 60,000 square miles and includes the Hawaiian Islands chain as well as American Samoa. While her primary mission is servicing aids-to-navigation, she is also tasked with maritime law enforcement, marine pollution prevention and response, treaty enforcement, defense and homeland security, and search and rescue.

== Operational history ==
After leaving the shipyard and finishing outfitting at the Coast Guard Yard at Curtis Bay, Maryland, Walnut transited the Panama Canal and arrived at her home-port of Honolulu on 29 May 1999. On 14 November 2002, her crew was alerted for duty in the northern Persian Gulf and had less than two months to prepare the ship for the deployment. She departed Hawaii on 18 January 2003, arriving in Persian Gulf waters just prior to the invasion of Iraq by coalition forces led by the United States. Walnut installed 34 new buoys while removing 25 older un-serviceable buoys during the six-month deployment. She also participated in search and rescue operations, towing and logistical assistance, UN sanctions enforcement boardings, and standby for oil recovery duties. Walnut arrived home from a six-month deployment 27 June 2003 after port calls at Singapore and Cairns, Australia. During February 2005, Walnut established a security zone surrounding the grounding of M/V Cape Flattery while damage assessments to coral reefs were being conducted. In July 2005 she conducted lightering of fuel from the grounded M/V Casitas at Pearl and Hermes Atoll, now a part of the Papahānaumokuākea Marine National Monument. On 9 September 2006, Walnut intercepted M/V Marshalls 201, a foreign-flagged fishing vessel illegally fishing in the Howland/Baker Exclusive Economic Zone.

During the summer of 2019 Walnut and USCGC Joseph Gerczak visited the smaller ports of American Samoa and neighboring Samoa. The Coast Guard vessels met with HMNZS Otago, a Protector class off-shore patrol vessel from New Zealand, to prepare for actual joint missions.

In late January, 2020, Walnut left Honolulu for the final time, bound for the Coast Guard Yard in Curtis Bay, in Baltimore. Here, she will receive an extensive work as part of the Coast Guard's midlife maintenance availability program. The vessel will be the 9th Juniper-class tender to receive this midlife extension. After the work is completed, Walnut will be reassigned to Pensacola, Florida, to replace her sister-cutter, USCGC Cypress. USCGC Juniper is expected to replace the Walnut by the end of 2020.

== See also ==
- USCG seagoing buoy tender

== Notes ==
Citations

References

- "225-foot Seagoing Buoy Tender (WLB)". Cutters, Craft & U.S. Coast Guard-Manned Army & Navy Vessels. U.S. Coast Guard Historian's Office.
- "Case: Cape Flattery, HI". Damage Assessment, Remediation, and Restoration Program. National Oceanic and Atmospheric Administration. Archived from the original (pdf) on 7 April 2014.
- "Case: Casitas, HI". Damage Assessment, Remediation, and Restoration Program. National Oceanic and Atmospheric Administration. Archived from the original (pdf) on 7 April 2014.
- "Fishing Vessel Illegally Fishing In U.S. Waters Seized". World Maritime News. 21 September 2006.
- "United States of America vs. Marshalls 201, Motion to Dismiss" (PDF). District Court of Guam. United States Department of State.
- "CGC Walnut Area of Responsibility (AOR)". U.S. Coast Guard.
- "CGC Walnut Our Missions". U.S. Coast Guard.
- "CGC Walnut Unit History". U.S. Coast Guard.
