= Armidale (disambiguation) =

Armidale, New South Wales is a city in Australia.

Armidale may also refer to:

== Places ==
- Armidale Regional Council, a local government area
- Armidale Dumaresq Shire
- Armidale railway station
- Armidale Airport
- The Armidale School
- Armidale High School
- Electoral district of Armidale (abolished in 1981)

== Other uses ==
- Royal Australian Navy vessels named HMAS Armidale
  - Armidale-class patrol boat

== See also ==
- Armdale, Halifax, Nova Scotia, Canada
- Armadale (disambiguation)
