= Armadale railway station =

Armadale railway station may refer to:

- Armadale railway station (Scotland), in Armadale, West Lothian
- Armadale railway station, Melbourne, in Armadale, Victoria, Australia
- Armadale railway station, Perth, in Armadale, Western Australia, Australia

== See also ==
- Armdale station, in Armdale, Nova Scotia, Canada
- Armidale railway station, in Armidale, New South Wales, Australia
- Armadale (disambiguation)
