= Future of the Royal New Zealand Navy =

The Royal New Zealand Navy has several long-term projects to retain and update its capabilities for the future.

== 2019 Defence Capability Plan ==
In June 2019 the NZ Ministry of Defence released the Defence Capability Plan 2019 which superseded the previous 2016 Defence White Paper produced by the National Government. Revealed in the 2019 DCP was the NZDF's intention to:

- Retire immediately two of the Lake-class inshore patrol vessel. In 2022, Rotoiti, along with her sister Pukaki, was sold to Ireland for use by the Irish Naval Service.
- Procure a new offshore patrol vessel from 2027 to patrol the southern ocean, built to commercial standards, and costing approximately $300–600 million. The future of the remaining two Lake-class inshore patrol vessels will be reassessed. In March 2022, the Ministry of Defence announced that the project was postponed indefinitely due to financial and prioritization constraints.
- 5 MH-60R to replace the 8 SH-2G(I) Super Seasprite helicopter from 2028 onwards, projected cost up to $1 billion.
- Procure two new enhanced sea lift vessels, one supplementing HMNZS Canterbury from 2029 before being replaced in 2035 by the second vessel. The vessels, through the provision of a well dock are expected to be able to conduct operations in a wider range of sea conditions, and proposed to have the size and capacity to carry large equipment, and sufficient aviation capacity to allow extended, long duration operations. Its size is also expected to provide for the transport of a larger number of personnel.
- An enhanced service and maintenance package to allow the extension of the two ANZAC frigates expected service lives beyond 2030.
- Replace the Protector-class Offshore Patrol vessels by early 2030s.
- Replace the Anzac-class frigates by the mid 2030s.

== 2025 Defence Capability Plan ==
2025 Defence Capability Plan was published in April 2025. It included increases in defence spending. For Royal New Zealand Navy, the main items in the DCP in the time frame 2025-28 were:

1. Enhanced strike capabilities. New naval and/or coastal anti-ship missiles.

2. Frigate sustainment programme. Maintaining the Anzac-class frigates.

3. Persistent surveillance using uncrewed autonomous vessels and air vehicles. Buying new unmanned aerial, surface, and underwater vehicles.

4. Replacing maritime helicopters. Replacing the Kaman SH-2G(I) Super Seasprite helicopters. Later it was announced that the replacement is the MH-60R helicopter.

5. Future replacement vessels from 2029-39. Much of the 2025 fleet of RNZN needed replacing in about a decade. See Maritime Fleet Renewal programme.

6. Future Devonport Naval Base design. Developing Devonport Naval Base.

== Maritime Fleet Renewal programme ==
All commissioned ships of the RNZN except HMNZS Aotearoa are planned to be replaced during the next decade (about 2025-2035 time frame). The Maritime Fleet Renewal program aims to acquire a number of new ships (the final composition of the future fleet will be determined through the course of the programme) to replace the old ships (all current ships except HMNZS Aotearoa) which are expected to reach the end of their service lives by the mid-2030s. The Maritime Fleet Renewal program will also focus on uncrewed maritime systems, and includes infrastructure modernisation at Devonport Naval Base in Auckland. Most procurement activity is expected to take place in the early 2030s. Especially the RNZN's two ANZAC-class frigates are planned to be replaced either by Japanese Mogami-class frigate or UK Royal Navy’s Type 31 frigate; no final decision has yet been made and formal advice is expected to be presented to government at the end of 2027. Also considered is the replacement of the maritime projection and sealift capability of HMNZS Canterbury.

== 2025-2028 defence investments ==
On 6 May 2025, Defence Minister Judith Collins confirmed that the Government would allocate NZ$2 billion (US$1.2 billion) from its four-year NZ$12 billion defence funding allocation to purchasing new maritime helicopters for the Navy.

On 21 August 2025, Collins and Foreign Minister Winston Peters announced that the Government would replace the RNZN's eight Kaman SH-2G Super Seasprites with five new MH-60R Seahawks for the Royal New Zealand Navy as part of its long-term defence investment. Each Seahawk helicopter is expected to cost NZ$400 million, with a total cost of NZ$2 billion. The Seahawk helicopters have a top speed of 333km/h and will be equipped with anti-submarine torpedoes, Hellfire air-surface missiles and machine guns.

In early June 2026, the United States Department of State authorised the sale of five MH-60R Seahawk helicopters and Mark 54 lightweight torpedoes to New Zealand, worth NZ$2.6 billion (US$1.5 billion).
