= USCGC Juniper =

US Coast Guard seagoing buoy tender

USCGC Juniper (WLB-201)
- USCGC Juniper sailing past the Statue of Liberty.

History

United States
- Name: Juniper
- Laid down: 2 May 1994
- Launched: 24 June 1995
- Commissioned: 5 July 1996
- Home port: Honolulu, Hawaii
- Identification: IMO number: 9155535; MMSI number: 366952000; Callsign: NDJV
- Motto: "Leading the Way", "Tending Da Kine with Aloha!"
- Status: in active service
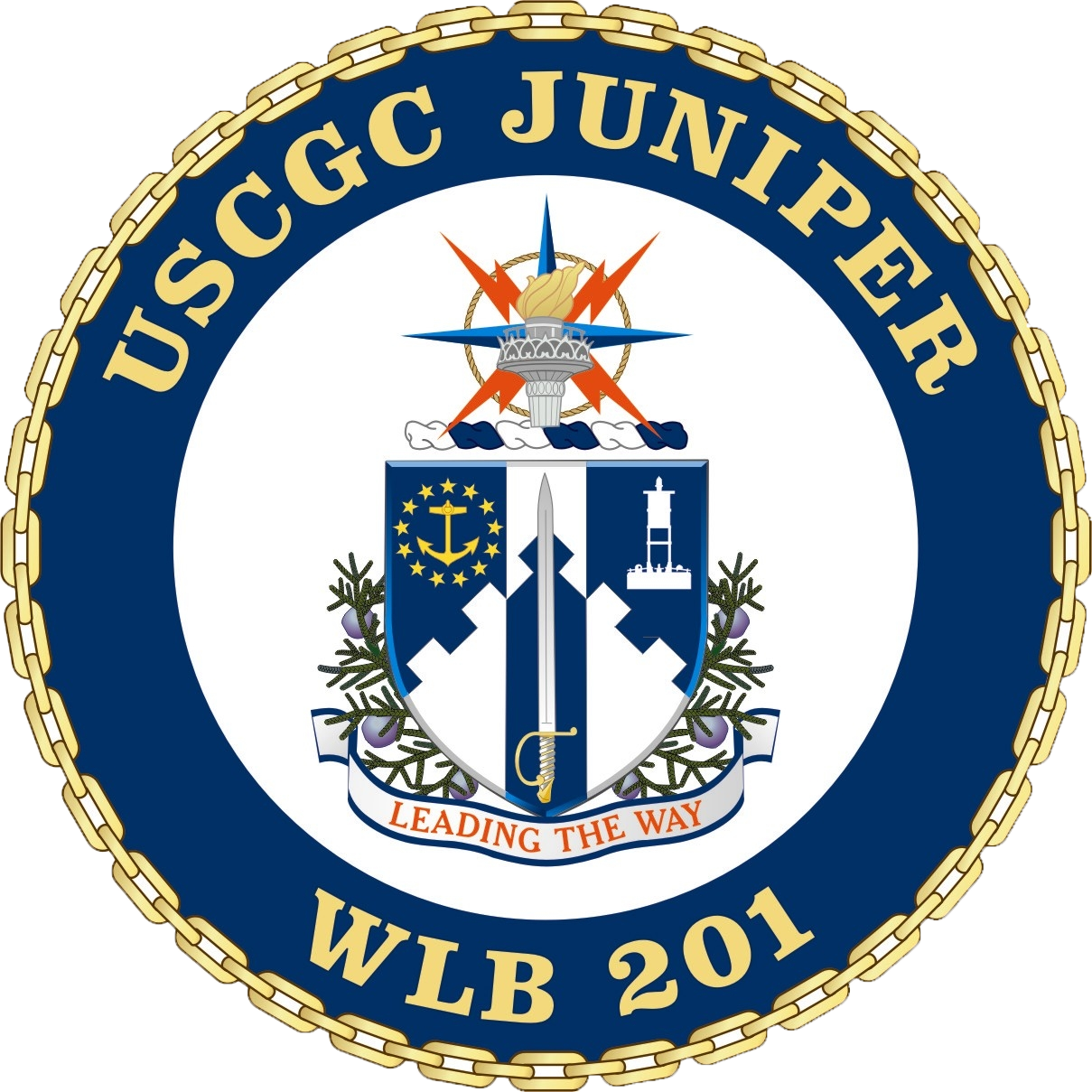
- Badge

General characteristics
- Displacement: 2,000 tons (full load)
- Length: 225 ft (69 m)
- Beam: 46 ft (14 m)
- Draft: 13 ft (4.0 m)
- Propulsion: Two 3,100 hp Caterpillar; diesel engines
- Speed: 16 knots
- Complement: 8 officers, 40 enlisted
- Sensors & processing systems: 1 x Navigational Radar
- Armament: Provision for 1 x Mk 38 25 mm naval gun; 2 x .50 caliber machine guns

USCGC Juniper (WLB-201) is the lead ship of the U.S. Coast Guard's current class of seagoing buoy tenders. She is outfitted with some of the most advanced technological and navigational capabilities currently available.

== Predecessors ==
Her namesake, the first Juniper, was commissioned into the U.S. Lighthouse Service (USLHS) back in 1903. The USLHS was its own uniformed service completely separate from the Coast Guard, (which was formed in 1915 by the merger of the Lifesaving Service with the Revenue Cutter Service). Juniper, homeported in Baltimore, Maryland, was responsible for resupplying lighthouses and maintaining navigational buoys in the Chesapeake Bay until its decommissioning in 1932. While comparatively small at 95 feet long and 125 tons, Juniper was of solid construction and served as a civilian cargo vessel out of Norfolk up until 1979.

In the late 1930s, the USLHS constructed the second Juniper. The USLHS was absorbed into the Coast Guard in 1939, and the Juniper was designated a Coastal Buoy Tender, WLM 224. WLM 224 was a twin screw (propeller), diesel electric vessel. She became the rough prototype for the 180' class of ocean-going buoy tenders, designated WLB. The WLM 224 Juniper operated out of St. Petersburg, Florida. She serviced aids to navigation all along the gulf coast of Florida, including Fort Jefferson National Monument. Juniper was decommissioned in 1975.

== WLB-201 ==
Wreckage recovered from TWA Flight 800, on the deck of Juniper

The advances made from the 180 foot vintage seagoing buoytenders to the current Juniper class are all-encompassing. The current Juniper is much larger at 225 feet and 2000 tons, and was the first cutter to fully leverage and implement many technological advances such as electronic charting, position keeping, and remote engineering monitoring and control. Juniper is also designed to skim and recover oil in the event of an oil spill.

Juniper's Integrated Ship Control System has an Electronic Charting Display and Information System (ECDIS) which enables fixing her position to within five meters every second. Her Dynamic Positioning System (DPS) uses this positioning information, the ship's controllable-pitch propeller, and the stern and bow thrusters to keep the ship on station without any human input.

These systems allow Juniper and her crew to work more buoys in less time, more efficiently and safely, and in tougher environmental conditions than her predecessors. Juniper's Machinery Plant Control and Monitoring System (MPCMS) has over 1000 sensors throughout the ship. This system makes it possible for one person in the engine room control center to monitor the ship’s plant while underway. Juniper and her crew are adept at handling various missions such as aids to navigation, law enforcement, homeland security, ice breaking, environmental pollution response, and search and rescue.

Juniper assisted in the recovery operations following the crashes of TWA Flight 800 and Egypt Air 990. She also participated in anti-terrorist and force protection operations in New York City immediately after the September 11, 2001 attacks.

On February 3, 2007, Juniper participated in reef building efforts off New Jersey, deploying 160,000 pounds of concrete sinkers recovered from old buoy markers to aid in the recovery of local fish populations.

Originally based in Newport, Rhode Island, Juniper began receiving her midlife maintenance availability (MMA) upgrades and overhauls at the Coast Guard Yard in Maryland on September 25, 2019. After completion of this maintenance work, Juniper would be reassigned to a new homeport in Honolulu replacing Walnut after she began her own MMA in 2020.
