= Rockingham station (Nova Scotia) =

Railway station in Nova Scotia, Canada

Coordinates: 44.6740°N 63.6455°W

Rockingham

History
- Closed: 1990

Former services
Preceding station	Canadian National Railway	Following station
Birch Cove toward St. John	St. John – Halifax	Fairview Junction toward Halifax
Preceding station	Dominion Atlantic Railway	Following station
Bedford toward Yarmouth	Main Line	Armdale toward Halifax
Location

Rockingham station was a railway station in Rockingham, Nova Scotia, Canada. It was located near Mount Saint Vincent University and was originally operated by the Canadian National Railway and later Via Rail. In the 1970s and 1980s, it was served by Budd Rail Diesel Car passenger trains operated by CN and later Via until the end of RDC service in Nova Scotia in 1990.
