= Armadale =

Armadale may refer to:

== Places ==
=== Australia ===
- Armadale, Victoria, a suburb of Melbourne
- Armadale, Western Australia, a suburb of Perth
  - City of Armadale, a local government area
  - Electoral district of Armadale, a Legislative Assembly electorate

==== Rail in Australia ====
- Armadale line, Western Australia
- Armadale railway station, Perth, Western Australia
- Armadale railway station, Melbourne, Victoria

=== Canada ===
- Armadale, Ontario, a historic community

==== School in Canada ====
- Armadale Public School, an elementary school

=== Scotland ===
- Armadale, Skye, Highland
- Armadale, Sutherland, Highland
- Armadale, West Lothian
  - Armadale Stadium

== Other usage ==
- Armadale (automobile), an obsolete British automobile
- Armadale (novel), a book by Wilkie Collins
- Armadale F.C., an association football club based in Armadale, West Lothian
- Armadale SC, an association football club based in Armadale, Western Australia

== See also ==
- Armadale railway station (disambiguation)
- Armdale, Halifax, Nova Scotia, Canada
- Armidale (disambiguation)
