= HMAS Armidale =

Two ships of the Royal Australian Navy (RAN) have been named HMAS Armidale, for the city of Armidale, New South Wales.

- HMAS Armidale (J240), a Bathurst-class corvette launched in January 1942 and sunk by Japanese aircraft on 1 December 1942; the only ship of the class lost to enemy action
- A Fremantle-class patrol boat announced in August 1980 was to be named Armidale, but the vessel was cancelled before construction
- HMAS Armidale (ACPB 83), the lead ship of the Armidale-class patrol boats, was commissioned in 2005 and is active as of 2016

== Battle honours ==
Three battle honours have been awarded to ships named HMAS Armidale:

- Darwin 1942
- Pacific 1942
- New Guinea 1942
