= HMAS Armidale (ACPB 83) =

2005 Armidale-class patrol boat

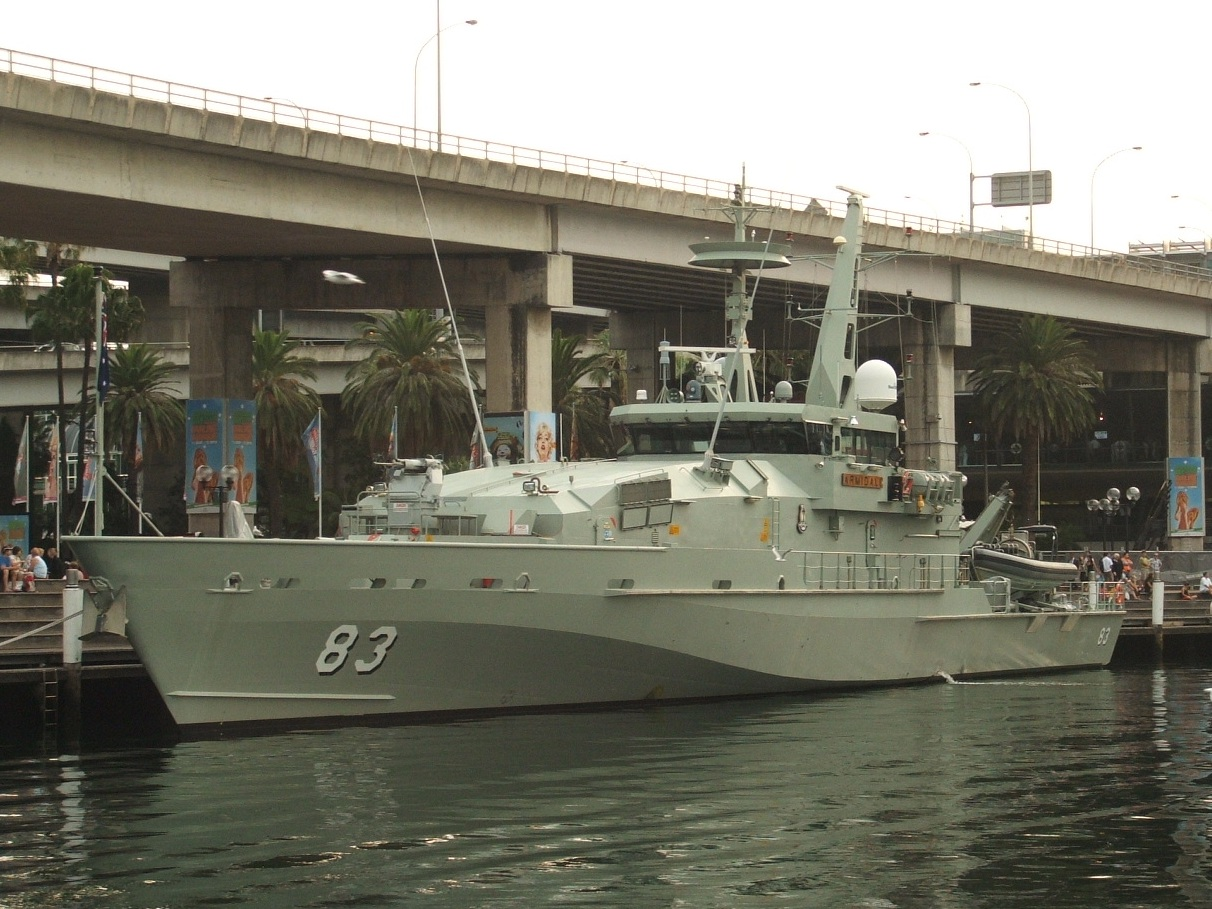
- HMAS Armidale at Darling Harbour in January 2008

History

Australia
- Namesake: City of Armidale, New South Wales
- Builder: Austal, Henderson, Western Australia
- Commissioned: 24 June 2005
- Decommissioned: 30 March 2023
- Home port: HMAS Coonawarra, Darwin
- Identification: Callsign: VKCV
- Motto: "Stand Firm"
- Honours and awards: Three inherited battle honours
- Badge

General characteristics
- Class & type: Armidale-class patrol boat
- Displacement: 300 tons standard load
- Length: 56.8 m (186 ft)
- Beam: 9.7 m (32 ft)
- Draught: 2.7 m (8.9 ft)
- Propulsion: 2 × MTU 4000 16V 6,225 horsepower (4,642 kW) diesels driving twin propellers
- Speed: 25 knots (46 km/h; 29 mph)
- Range: 3,000 nautical miles (5,600 km; 3,500 mi) at 12 knots (22 km/h; 14 mph)
- Endurance: 21 days standard, 42 days maximum
- Boats & landing craft carried: 2 × Zodiac 7.2 m (24 ft) RHIBs
- Complement: 21 standard, 29 maximum
- Sensors & processing systems: Bridgemaster E surface search/navigation radar
- Electronic warfare & decoys: Prism III radar warning system; Toplite electro-optical detection system; Warrlock direction finding system
- Armament: 1 × Rafael Typhoon stabilised gun mount fitted with a 25 mm (1 in) M242 Bushmaster autocannon; 2 × 12.7 mm (0.5 in) machine guns

HMAS Armidale (ACPB 83), named for the city of Armidale, New South Wales, is the lead ship of the Armidale class of patrol boats serving in the Royal Australian Navy (RAN). It was commissioned in June 2005 and decommissioned in March 2023.

== Design and construction ==
The Armidale-class patrol boats are 56.8 metres (186 ft) long, with a beam of 9.7 metres (32 ft), a draught of 2.7 metres (8 ft 10 in), and a standard displacement of 270 tons. The semi-displacement vee hull is fabricated from aluminium alloy, and each vessel is built to a combination of Det Norske Veritas standards for high-speed light craft and RAN requirements. The Armidale's can travel at a maximum speed of 25 knots (46 km/h; 29 mph), and are driven by two propeller shafts, each connected to an MTU 16V M70 diesel. The ships have a range of 3,000 nautical miles (5,600 km; 3,500 mi) at 12 knots (22 km/h; 14 mph), allowing them to patrol the waters around the distant territories of Australia, and are designed for standard patrols of 21 days, with a maximum endurance of 42 days.

The main armament of the Armidale class is a Rafael Typhoon stabilised 25-millimetre (0.98 in) gun mount fitted with an M242 Bushmaster autocannon. Two 12.7-millimetre (0.50 in) machine guns are also carried. Boarding operations are performed by two 7.2-metre (24 ft), waterjet propelled rigid-hulled inflatable boats (RHIBs). Each RHIB is stored in a dedicated cradle and davit, and is capable of operating independently from the patrol boat as it carries its own communications, navigation, and safety equipment.

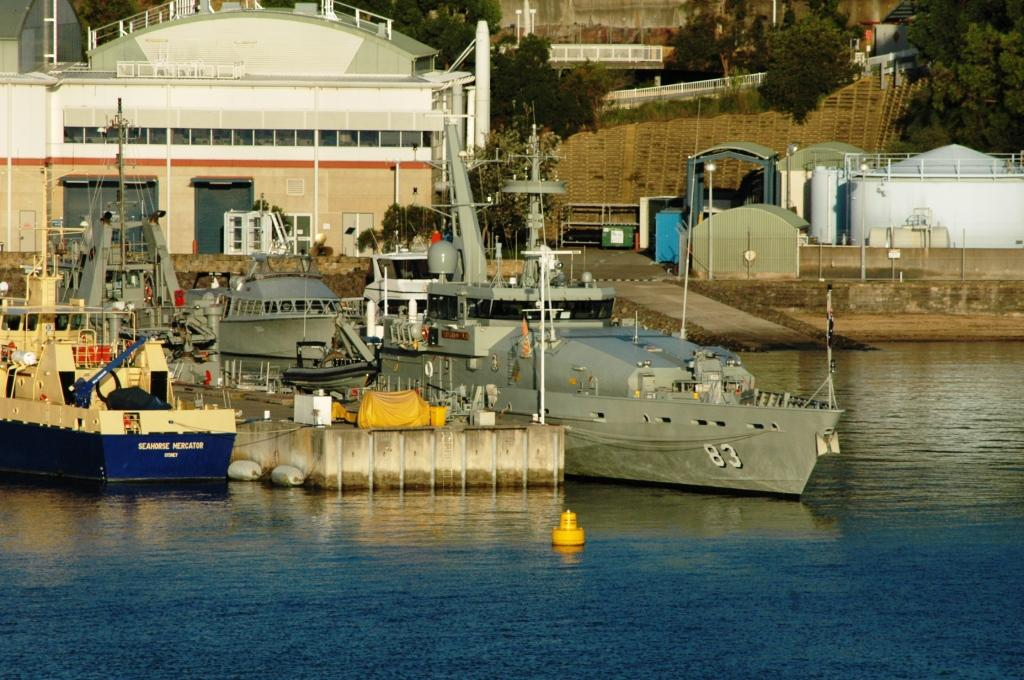
HMAS Armidale docked at HMAS Waterhen in 2008

Each patrol boat has a standard ship's company of 21 personnel, with a maximum of 29. The Armidale class have returned to a permanently assigned ship's company; previously they were assigned to divisions at a ratio of two vessels to three companies, which rotated through the vessels and allow platforms to spend more time at sea. A 20-berth auxiliary accommodation compartment was included in the design for the transportation of soldiers, illegal fishermen, or unauthorised arrivals; in the latter two cases, the compartment could be secured from the outside. However, a malfunction in the sewerage treatment facilities aboard HMAS Maitland in August 2006 pumped hydrogen sulfide and carbon monoxide into the compartment, non-fatally poisoning four sailors working inside, after which use of the compartment for accommodation was banned across the class.

Armidale was constructed by Austal in Henderson, Western Australia. She was commissioned into the RAN at HMAS Coonawarra in Darwin on 24 June 2005.

== Operational history ==
Armidale was based in Darwin, and performed border protection and fisheries protection patrols. After protests began in Solomon Islands in late 2021, the Australian Federal government deployed Armidale in addition to a team of Australian Army and Australian Federal Police officers to assist the Royal Solomon Islands Police Force to quell the unrest.

The patrol boat was decommissioned at Darwin on 30 March 2023. During its career Armidale sailed for over 571,000 nautical miles.
