= Armdale station =

Railway station in Nova Scotia, Canada

Coordinates: 44.643626°N 63.620479°W

Armdale

General information
- Line: Canadian National Railway

History
- Closed: 1990

Former Services
Preceding station	Canadian National Railway	Following station
Southwestern Junction toward St. John	St. John – Halifax	Halifax Terminus
Preceding station	Dominion Atlantic Railway	Following station
Rockingham toward Yarmouth	Main Line	Halifax Terminus
Location

Armdale station was a railway station in Armdale, Nova Scotia, Canada. It was operated originally by the Canadian National Railway and later by Via Rail. It was located near the Halifax Shopping Centre. In the 1970s and 1980s, it was served by Budd Rail Diesel Car (RDC) passenger trains operated by CN and later Via until the end of RDC service in Nova Scotia in 1990.
