= USCGC Joseph Gerczak =

American Sentinel-class Coast Guard cutter

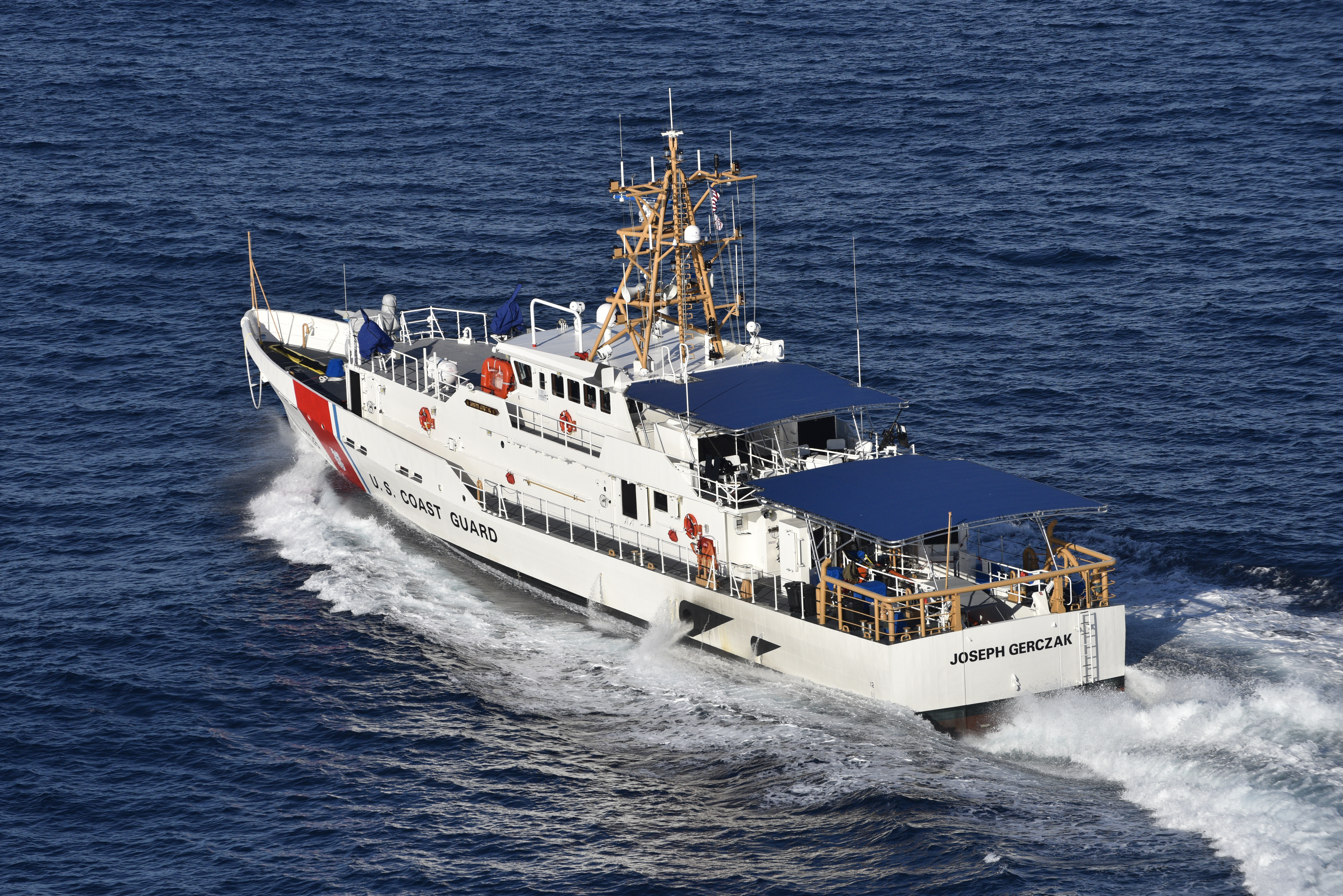
- Joseph Gerczak during her sea trials

History

United States
- Name: Joseph Gerczak
- Namesake: Joseph Gerczak
- Operator: United States Coast Guard
- Builder: Bollinger Shipyards, Lockport, Louisiana
- Launched: November 9, 2017
- Acquired: November 9, 2017
- Commissioned: March 9, 2018
- Home port: Honolulu, Hawaii
- Identification: MMSI number: 338926426; Callsign: NJOG; Hull number: WPC-1126
- Motto: Unrelenting courage
- Status: in active service
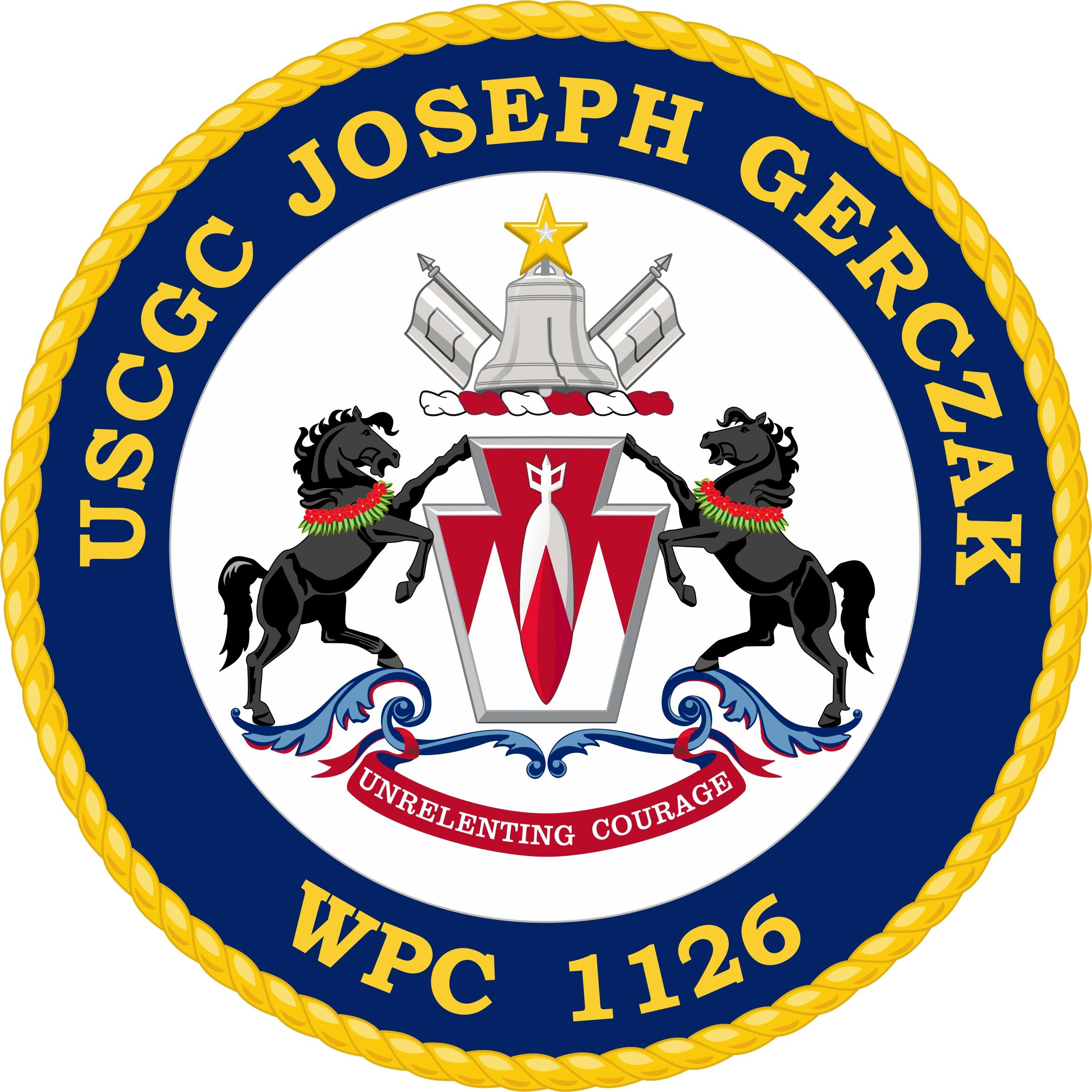
- Badge

General characteristics
- Class & type: Sentinel-class cutter
- Displacement: 353 long tons (359 t)
- Length: 46.8 m (154 ft)
- Beam: 8.11 m (26.6 ft)
- Depth: 2.9 m (9.5 ft)
- Propulsion: 2 × 4,300 kW (5,800 shp); 1 × 75 kW (101 shp) bow thruster
- Speed: 28 knots (52 km/h; 32 mph)
- Range: 2,500 nautical miles (4,600 km; 2,900 mi)
- Endurance: 5 days
- Boats & landing craft carried: 1 × Cutter Boat - Over the Horizon Interceptor
- Complement: 4 officers, 20 crew
- Sensors & processing systems: L-3 C4ISR suite
- Armament: 1 × Mk 38 Mod 2 25 mm automatic gun; 4 × crew-served Browning M2 machine guns

USCGC Joseph Gerczak (WPC-1126) is the 26th Sentinel-class cutter built for the United States Coast Guard. She is one of three Fast Response Cutters homeported in Honolulu, Hawaii.

== Design ==
Like her sister ships, Joseph Gerczak is designed to perform search and rescue missions, port security, and the interception of smugglers. She is armed with a remotely controlled, gyrostabilized 25 mm autocannon, four crew-served M2 Browning machine guns, and light arms. She is equipped with a stern launching ramp, that allows her to launch or retrieve a water-jet propelled high-speed auxiliary boat, without first coming to a stop. Her high-speed boat has over-the-horizon capability, and is useful for inspecting other vessels, and deploying boarding parties. She is designed to support her crew of 24 for missions of up to five days, over distances of almost 3,000 nautical miles (5,556 km; 3,452 mi).

== Operational history ==
On November 9, 2017, the U.S. Coast Guard took delivery of Joseph Gerczak from Bollinger Shipyards in Key West, Florida.

On February 4, 2018, Joseph Gerczak arrived at her new homeport of Honolulu following a 42-day transit from Key West, Florida.

On March 9, 2018, Joseph Gerczak was commissioned into service at Coast Guard Base Honolulu. Vice Adm. Fred M. Midgette, commander, Coast Guard Pacific Area, presided over the ceremony accepting the second of three 154-foot fast response cutters to be stationed in Hawaii.

In August 2019, Joseph Gerczak became the first Fast Response Cutter to visit the Port of Pago Pago, American Samoa.

In February 2022, Joseph Gerczak became the first Fast Response Cutter to visit the Port of Pape’ete, Tahiti.

== Namesake ==
In 2010, Charles "Skip" W. Bowen, who was then the United States Coast Guard's most senior non-commissioned officer, proposed that all 58 cutters in the Sentinel class should be named after enlisted sailors in the Coast Guard, or one of its precursor services, who were recognized for their heroism. In 2015 the Coast Guard announced that Joseph Gerczak, who coolly shot down two Japanese planes, during World War II, before he himself was shot, would be the namesake of the 26th cutter.
