= Protector-class patrol vessel =

Ship class of patrol vessels

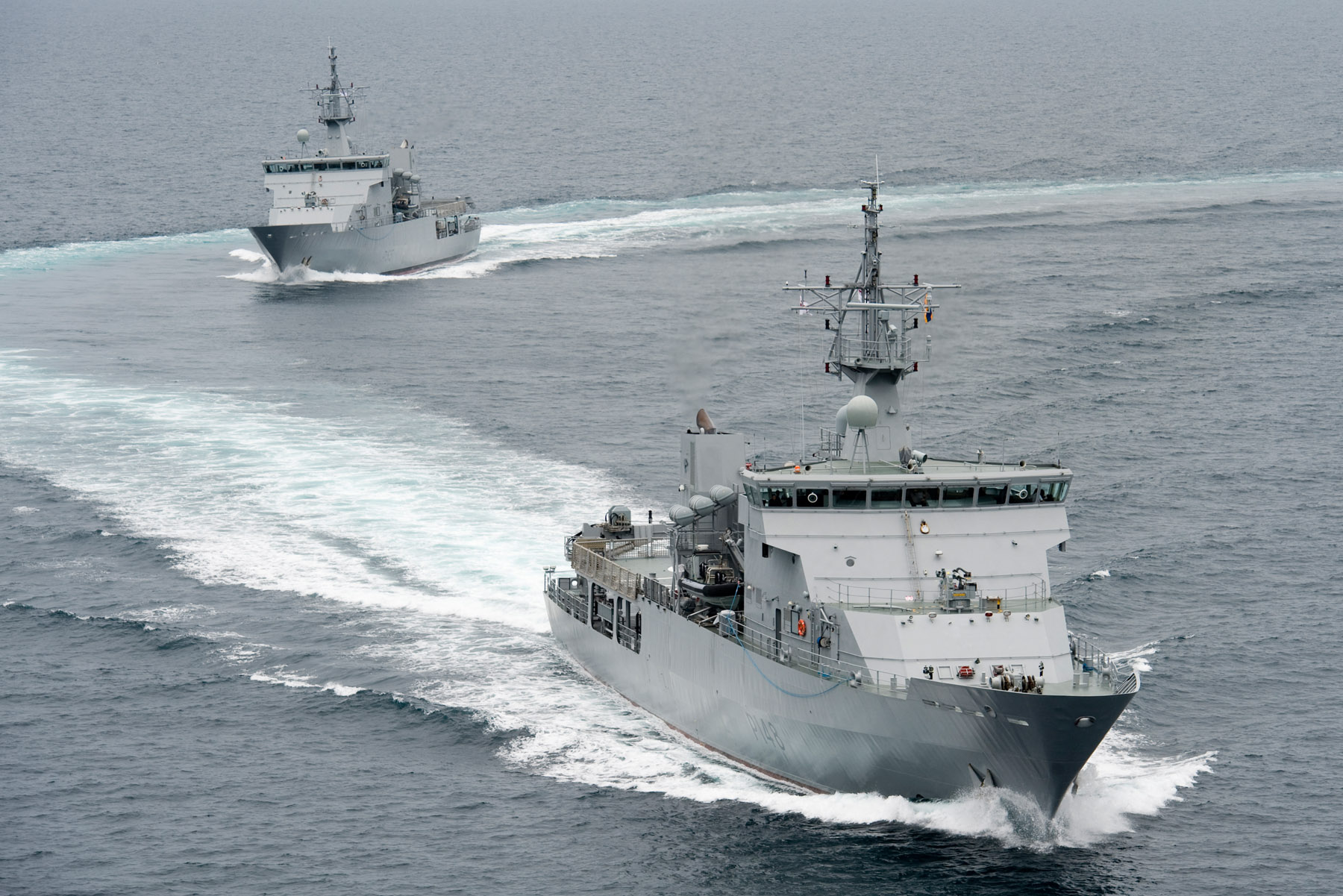
- Both Protector-class offshore patrol vessels in 2010

Class overview
- Name: Protector class
- Builders: Tenix, Williamstown
- Operators: Royal New Zealand Navy
- Cost: $110 million per vessel
- In commission: 2010
- Completed: 2
- Active: 2

General characteristics
- Type: Offshore patrol vessel
- Displacement: 1,900 tonnes
- Length: 85 m (278 ft 10 in)
- Beam: 14 m (45 ft 11 in)
- Draft: 3.6 m (11 ft 10 in)
- Propulsion: 2 × MAN B&W 12RK280 diesel engines, 5,400 kW (7,200 hp) each at 1,000 rpm; 450 kW (600 hp) bow thruster; 3 × MAN diesel electricity generators
- Speed: Baseline speed 22 knots (41 km/h; 25 mph); Economical speed 12 knots (22 km/h; 14 mph); Loiter speed 4 to 10 knots (7.4 to 18.5 km/h; 4.6 to 11.5 mph)
- Range: 6,000 nautical miles (11,000 km; 6,900 mi) at 15 knots (28 km/h; 17 mph)
- Endurance: 21 days
- Boats & landing craft carried: 2 × RHIB (7.74 m (25.4 ft)); 6 × 45 man inflatable rafts; 2 × special forces RHIB (11 m (36 ft))
- Capacity: 30 passengers, 3 × 20 ft sea container, 1 × 16 tonne, 9-metre crane aft
- Complement: 35 + 10 flight personnel + 4 personnel from Government agencies
- Sensors & processing systems: Fire control: Optical
- Armament: 1 × Remote Controlled Rafael Typhoon 25 mm stabilised naval gun, on forecastle; 2 × M2HB QCB .50 calibre Browning machine guns on pivots on either side of the bridge; Small arms
- Aircraft carried: 1 x Kaman SH-2G Super Seasprite helicopter. Can be armed with a combination of homing torpedoes, AGM119 ASM and MAG58 Machine Gun. 1 x A109 light utility helicopter (alternative to Seasprite)
- Aviation facilities: Hangar for Seasprite or A109

The Protector-class offshore patrol vessel (also known as the Otago class) is a ship class of two offshore patrol vessel (OPVs) operated by the Royal New Zealand Navy (RNZN) since 2010. The ships are named HMNZS Otago and HMNZS Wellington.

== Key dates ==
The Ministry of Defence issued invitations to register in July 2002 and signed a contract with Tenix Defence (later BAE Systems) in July 2004. The first steel was cut in February 2005, and the first OPV HMNZS Otago was launched on 18 November 2006 in Melbourne, Australia.

The original planned delivery date for HMNZS Otago was April 2007; this was then revised to early 2008. HMNZS Wellington was launched on 27 October 2007 with an original delivery date of May / June 2008.

While the ships are capable of carrying the SH-2G Seasprite, on 30 October 2007, the NZDF announced the acquisition of A109 light utility helicopters for training and deployment on RNZN ships, including the OPVs.

In September 2008, the Minister of Defence announced delays in the delivery of the two OPVs due to questions regarding the ships' seaboats and Lloyds Certification. He says the issue is under negotiation with BAE (ex-Tenix). In May 2009, mediation between the Ministry of Defence and BAE Systems commenced, with the main issue being the estimated 300 tonnes increase in weight which could cause potential hazard when OPVs are in ice in Antarctica as the weight increased over the life of the vessels.

On the 18 February 2010 Otago was accepted into the Royal New Zealand Navy. NZ Ministry of Defence claimed the overweight issue was not as bad as previously thought, but "weight will have to be carefully monitored during the ship's life". The vessel was scheduled to arrive at Devonport (Auckland) Naval Base on 26 March 2010. Wellington was accepted on 6 May 2010 and arrived at Devonport later that month. HMNZS Otago arrived at Devonport Naval Base after further delay in Australia due to engine problems, which were fixed under warranty.

== Design origin ==
Conceived as part of Project Protector, the Ministry of Defence project consisted of acquiring one multi-role vessel, two offshore and four inshore patrol vessels. The Project Protector vessels will be operated by the RNZN to conduct tasks for and with the New Zealand Customs Service, the Department of Conservation, Ministry of Foreign Affairs and Trade, Ministry of Fisheries, Maritime New Zealand, and New Zealand Police. The Government and Navy policy was that the OPVs are intended to carry out resource protection functions in the EEZ, South Pacific and Southern Ocean, to free the two Anzac-class frigates for other needs. However, with the capability to carry and sustain a missile-armed RNZN helicopter, they do have limited higher contingency capability.

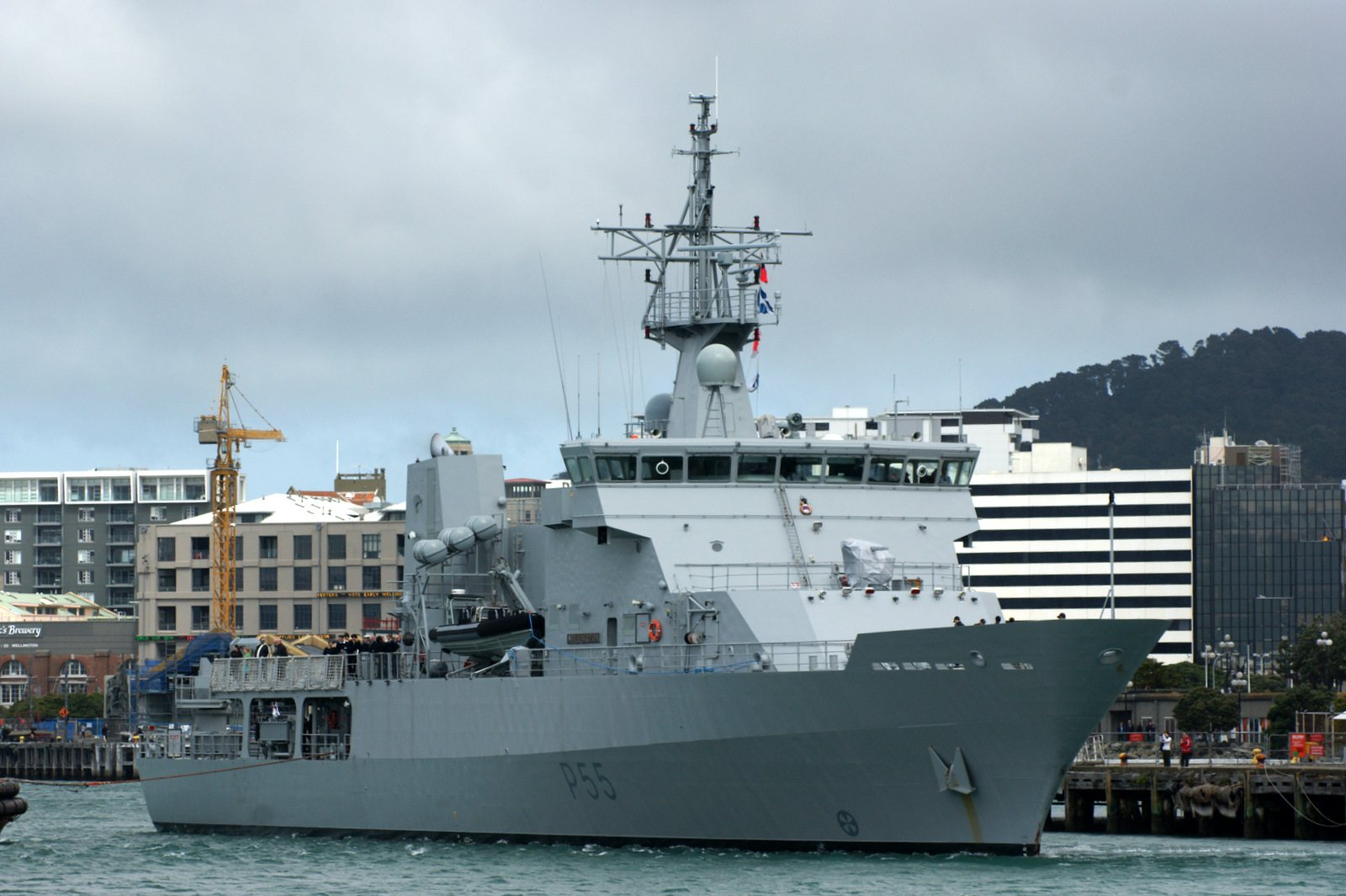
HMNZS Wellington in 2010

The vessels were designed by Vard Marine (known as STX Canada Marine and formerly Kvaerner Masa Marine) and are based on earlier OPV designs in service with the Irish Naval Service (since 1999) and the Mauritian Coast Guard (since 1996). However the adopted design is considerably upgraded, in that the Irish Naval Service no longer included helicopter facilities in its designs after the failure of helicopter operations from the OPV LÉ Eithne in the rough seas off the Irish west coast. Otago, however, includes helicopter facilities similar to the arrangements of the earlier Irish OPV, LÉ Eithne, which were based on the British Leander-class frigate, which modification to operate larger Lynx/Seasprite helicopters is based on the design of the last RNZN Leander, HMNZS Canterbury. The vessel is compliant with all of the operational requirements for patrol and response, cargo carriage and handling, sea keeping for sea boat and helicopter operations, and has a high level of comfort for crew and client agency officials.

Since 2014, after the takeover of STX Marine by Vard Group of Norway, which is part of Fincantieri, the design is now referred to as the Vard 7 85M.

The design and fitting of the OPVs was contested by the Executive, MOD, MFAT and the Navy. In June 2004 it was decided to use the remaining Budget allocation to fit the OPVs with ice strengthening, described by Deputy Secretary of Defence, Bruce Green, as a simple alteration which would add little cost, rather than use the money to fit the OPVs with a 57 mm (2 in) or 76 mm (3 in) small corvette-type general-purpose gun fitted to all post-1980 Irish OPVs including Ireland's latest order for a stretched 90-metre OPV or upgraded sensors given that military and civilian threat to territorial threats to the EEZ and NZ cannot be precisely differentiated. In reality the ice-strengthened belt resulted in the OPVs being 300 tons overweight and required much time and $84 million expenditure to modify. HMNZS Wellington performed well in sea state 7/8 in the Ross Ice Shelf in appalling conditions in February 2012 but still has only half the margin of the ordered specifications, limiting future modernisation and service life, given the inevitable increase in weight during the course of warships life. Also at issue was a third OPV rather than the IPVs strongly backed by Ministry of Fisheries and Defence Minister, Phil Goff, which lacked military relevance other than reserve and command training.

== Names ==
On 31 March 2006, Minister of Defence Phil Goff announced that the OPVs will be named HMNZS Otago and HMNZS Wellington. Otago and Wellington are the names of frigates previously operated by the RNZN. These ships will carry the honour board of their predecessors, and the heritage so represented.

An NZDF media release on 31 March 2006 gave pennant numbers for Otago (P148) and Wellington (P55). Otago's pennant number recalls HMNZS Taranaki (F148) and Wellington's pennant number recalls HMNZS Waikato (F55).

== Characteristics ==
=== EEZ patrol and response ===
- Sea boat deployment and recovery in sea state 4 (seas moderate, waves 1.25 - 2.5m)
- Helicopter launch and recovery in sea state 5 (seas rough, waves 2.5 - 4m)
- Vertrep in sea state 6 (seas very rough, waves 4 - 6m)
- Ability to patrol in sea state 6 and survive in sea state 9 (seas phenomenal, waves over 14m)

=== Ice strengthening ===
- Strengthened to provide Lloyds ice class 1C protection (thin or broken first year ice to a maximum depth of 0.4m).
- Involved strengthening the bow section, ice belt region, fin stabilisers, propulsion shaftline and the propellers.
- Allegations in May 2009 that ice strengthening has added too much extra weight to planned displacement (up now to 1900 tonnes) so the OPV will be at risk in Antarctica because ice belt strengthening is lower than planned, leaving plates above vulnerable to pounding by blocks of ice, and also not have the capability to add future weight by installing extra equipment. They are suitable for Southern Ocean patrols now, but it is expected that future weight increases "will have to be carefully monitored".

== See also ==
- Protector-class inshore patrol vessel
