= Kaman SH-2G Super Seasprite =

1993 series of anti-submarine helicopters

SH-2G Super Seasprite
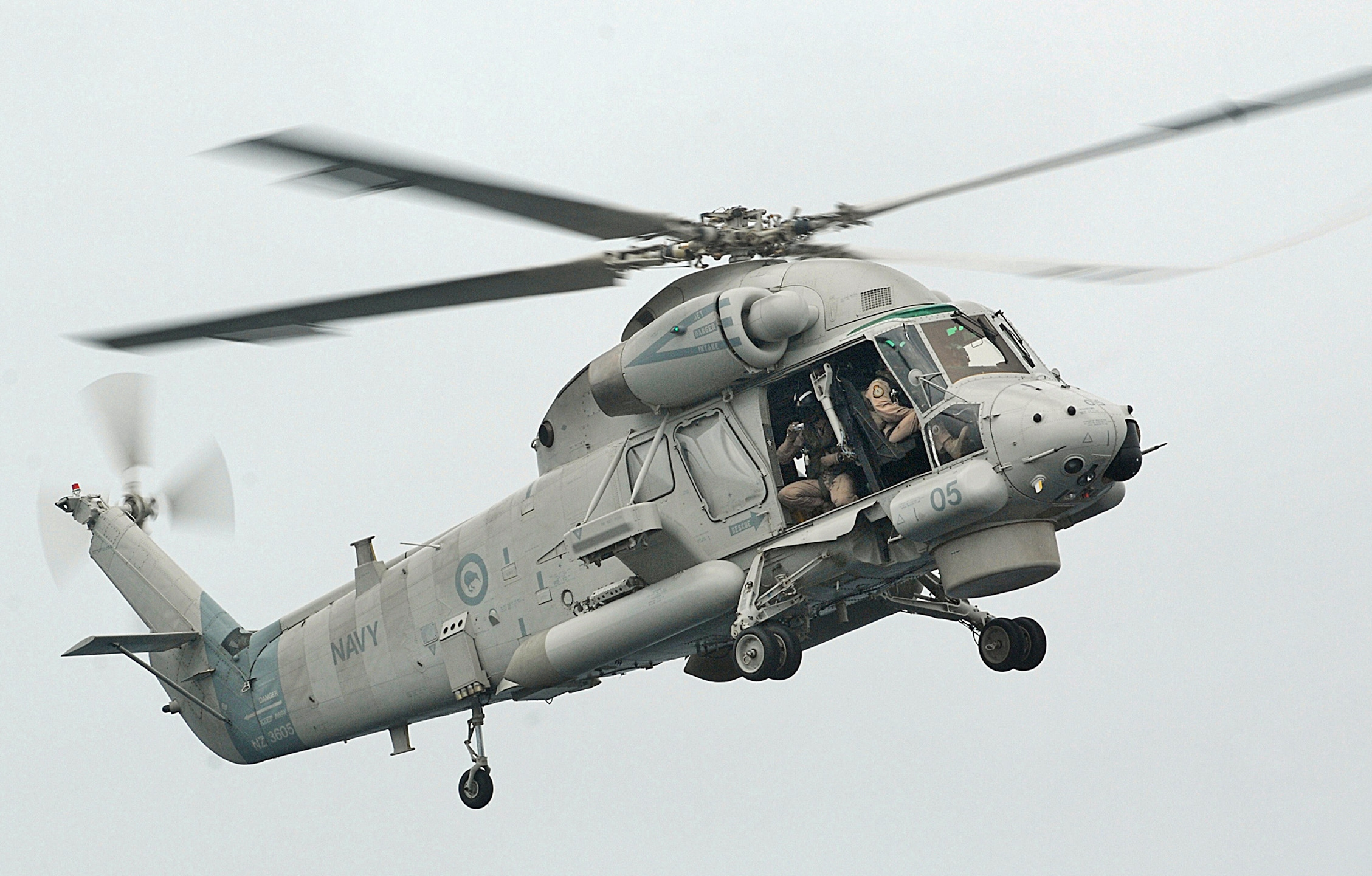
- A Royal New Zealand Navy SH-2G

General information
- Type: ASW helicopter
- National origin: United States
- Manufacturer: Kaman Aircraft
- Status: In service
- Primary users: United States Navy (historical) Egyptian Navy; Royal New Zealand Navy; Peruvian Navy

History
- Manufactured: 1985–1995 (also conversions)
- Introduction date: 1993
- First flight: 2 April 1985
- Retired: 2001 (United States Navy); 2008 (Royal Australian Navy); 2025 (Polish Navy)
- Developed from: Kaman SH-2 Seasprite

The Kaman SH-2G Super Seasprite is an American ship-based helicopter with anti-submarine, anti-surface threat capability, including over-the-horizon targeting. This aircraft extends and increases shipboard sensor and weapon capabilities against several types of enemy threats, including submarines of all types, surface ships, and patrol craft that may be armed with anti-ship missiles. It was originally developed for the United States Navy in the 1980s as a reengined and updated version of the older Kaman SH-2 Seasprite, which had been serving since the 1960s in a variety of versions. The G model was an evolution of the SH-2F, which was an important ASW aircraft for naval vessels that could not manage a larger helicopter. The SH-2G entered service in the 1980s and served until 2001 with the U.S. Navy. It went on to serve in several other Naval forces into the 21st Century and is still in active service in several countries.

The SH-2G's primary missions include anti-submarine and anti-surface warfare, anti-ship missile defense, and anti-ship surveillance and targeting. Secondary missions may include medical evacuation, search and rescue, personnel and cargo transfer, as well as small boat interdiction, amphibious assault air support, gunfire spotting, mine detection and battle damage assessment.

== Design and development ==
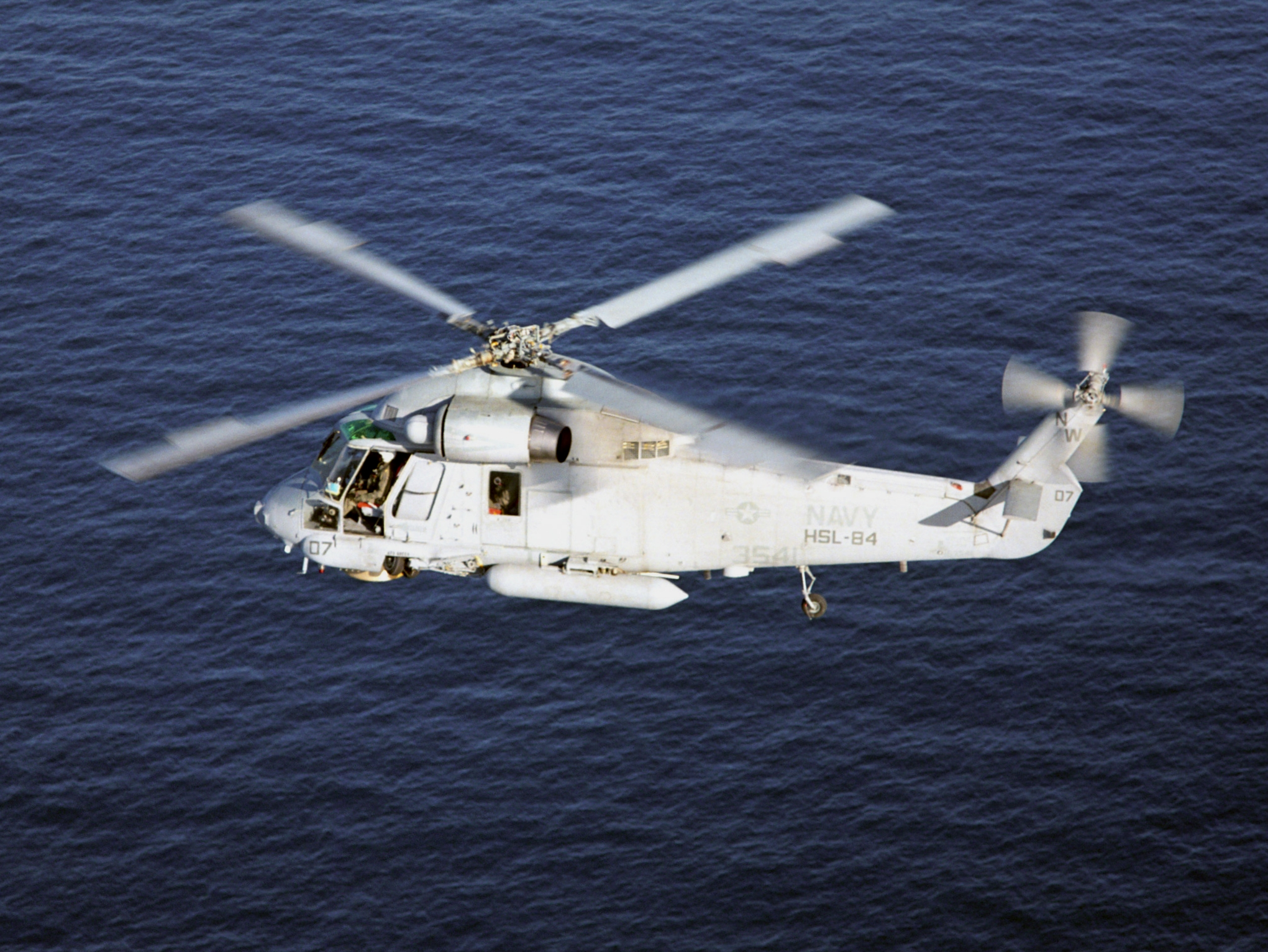
A US Navy SH-2G in 1995

In 1985, the SH-2G program was started. The US Navy wanted better anti-submarine capabilities and felt upgrading existing helicopters would be a more cost-effective approach; moreover legacy Knox-class and early "short-hull" Perry-class frigates operating the SH-2F could not operate the larger SH-60B Seahawk. The prototype YSH-2G first flew on 2 April 1985. The prototype was a modified SH-2F fitted with two more powerful General Electric T700-GE-401/401C engines.

The G-model has a reinforced upper fuselage to support the heavier new engines. The SH-2G also has multifunctional displays and new avionic systems. The Navy began receiving Airborne Mine Counter Measures (AMCM) hardware with the Kaman Magic Lantern laser mine detection system in December 1996.

The US Navy's final production order of the SH-2F was in Fiscal Year 1986 with the last six orders switched to the SH-2G variant. The USN SH-2G entered service in 1993.

== Operational history ==
This section covers operators of SH-2G Super Seasprite variant, for operators of earlier types see the operators section of the SH-2 Seasprite.

=== Australia ===
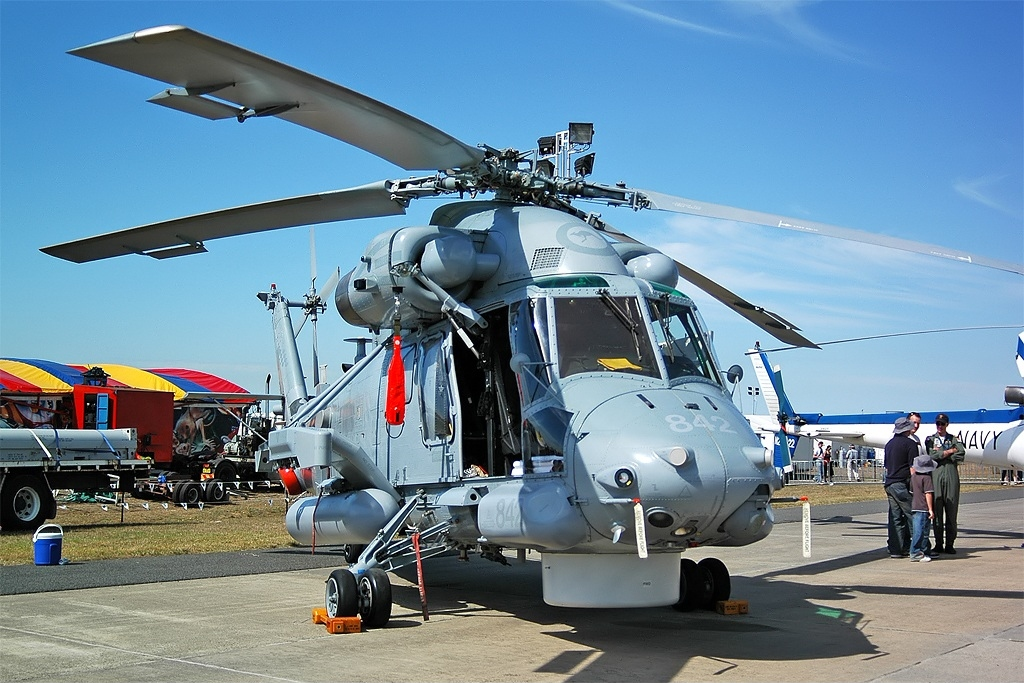
A SH-2G(A) in 2005

In the 1990s, the Royal Australian Navy (RAN) decided that it needed an intermediate helicopter to operate from the Anzac-class frigates and the planned offshore patrol vessel (OPV), a proposed cooperative project with Malaysia; however, due to its size, the OPV could operate only a small helicopter. In 1997, the Australian Government signed a A$667 million contract with Kaman to purchase 11 upgraded Super Seasprites. By 2005, up to 40 deficiencies in the helicopter had been identified, including the inability to operate in bad weather and low-light conditions, and its failure to meet Australian airworthiness standards. The helicopters were initially restricted to transport duties during good weather before being grounded in May 2006. By early 2007, ten Super Seasprites had been delivered to 805 Squadron.

In February 2007, The Australian announced that the Seasprite project was "almost certain to be scrapped". At this point, the project was six years over schedule and its cost had grown to A$1.1 billion, with an additional A$45 million forecast as required for further upgrades. If approved the squadron would still not reach operational status until 2010. The sale or scrapping of the fleet was under consideration, possible replacements included the NHIndustries NH90 or further orders of Sikorsky SH-60 Seahawks. On 25 May 2007, The Age reported the government would continue to support the Seasprite; Defence Minister Brendan Nelson commented that progress on the project was being closely monitored.

Following the election of the new Labor government, The Australian reported on 31 January 2008 that the SH-2G(A) program was likely to be canceled due to cost overruns; additionally it was still not operational despite the original contract being signed in 1997. The same article also noted that Sikorsky had submitted an offer of several 'off the shelf' helicopters to replace Australia's SH-2G(A)s. On 5 March 2008, the project was canceled by the government; Kaman noted the project's end "on mutually agreed terms". Opposition parties also supported the decision to cancel. The remaining aircraft were returned to Kaman. Following the cancellation of the Super Seasprite, S-70 Seahawks from 816 Squadron were assigned to the Anzac-class frigates. Australia already operated the S-70. Australia did end up using 6 MRH-90 Taipan (the Australian NH-90) for a period in the 2010s in Naval service, but overall went with upgraded SH-60.

=== Egypt ===
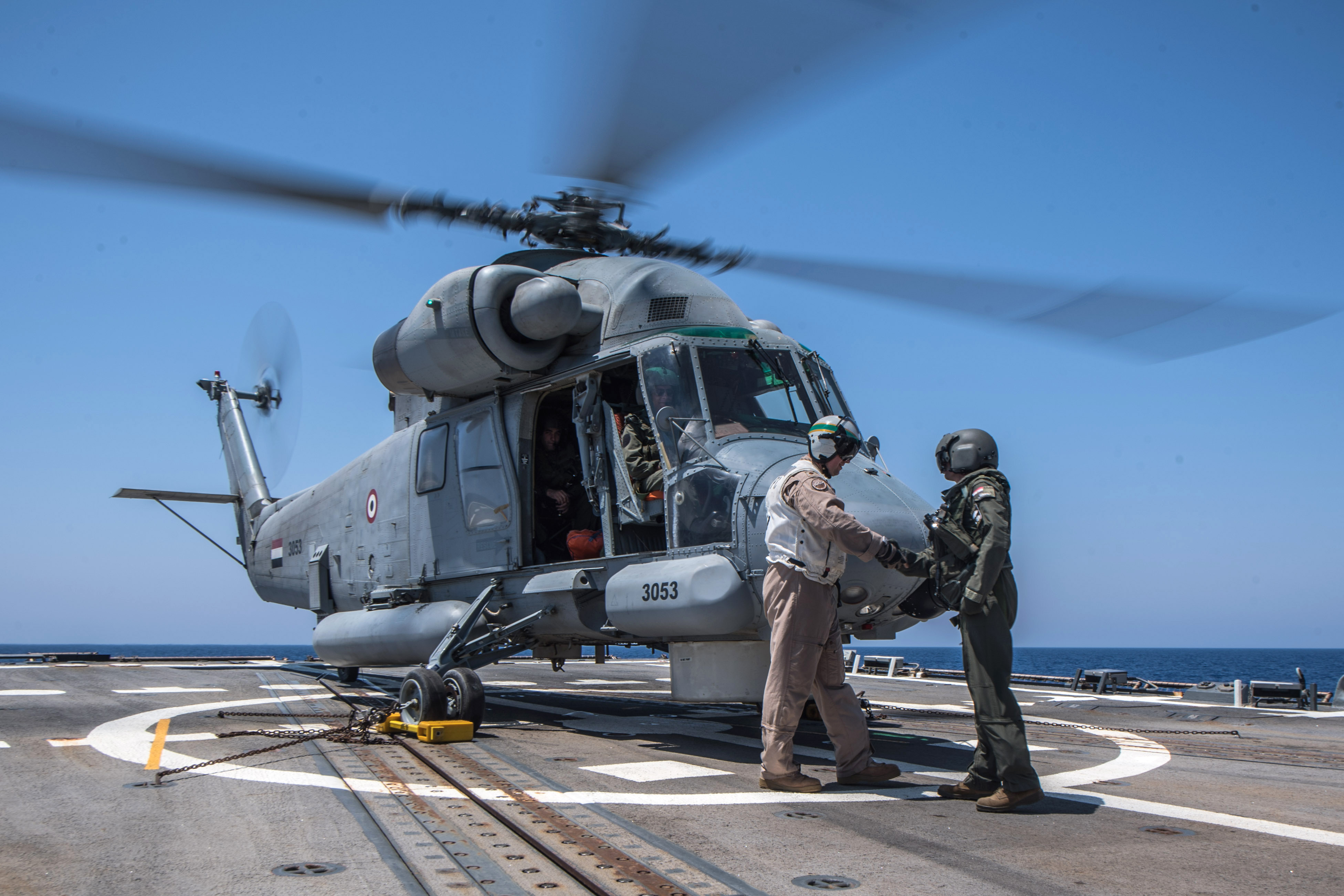
Egyptian SH-2G aboard the ship DDG-109 in the Red Sea, 2018

In 1995, Egypt signed a contract for 10 SH-2Gs for use by the Egyptian Navy. These helicopters had been equipped for anti-submarine duties and to be deployed on the Navy's ships as required; the procurement included AQS-18A dipping sonar, search radars, and an electronic support suite. They are often operated alongside Egypt's fleet of Westland Sea Kings.

=== New Zealand ===
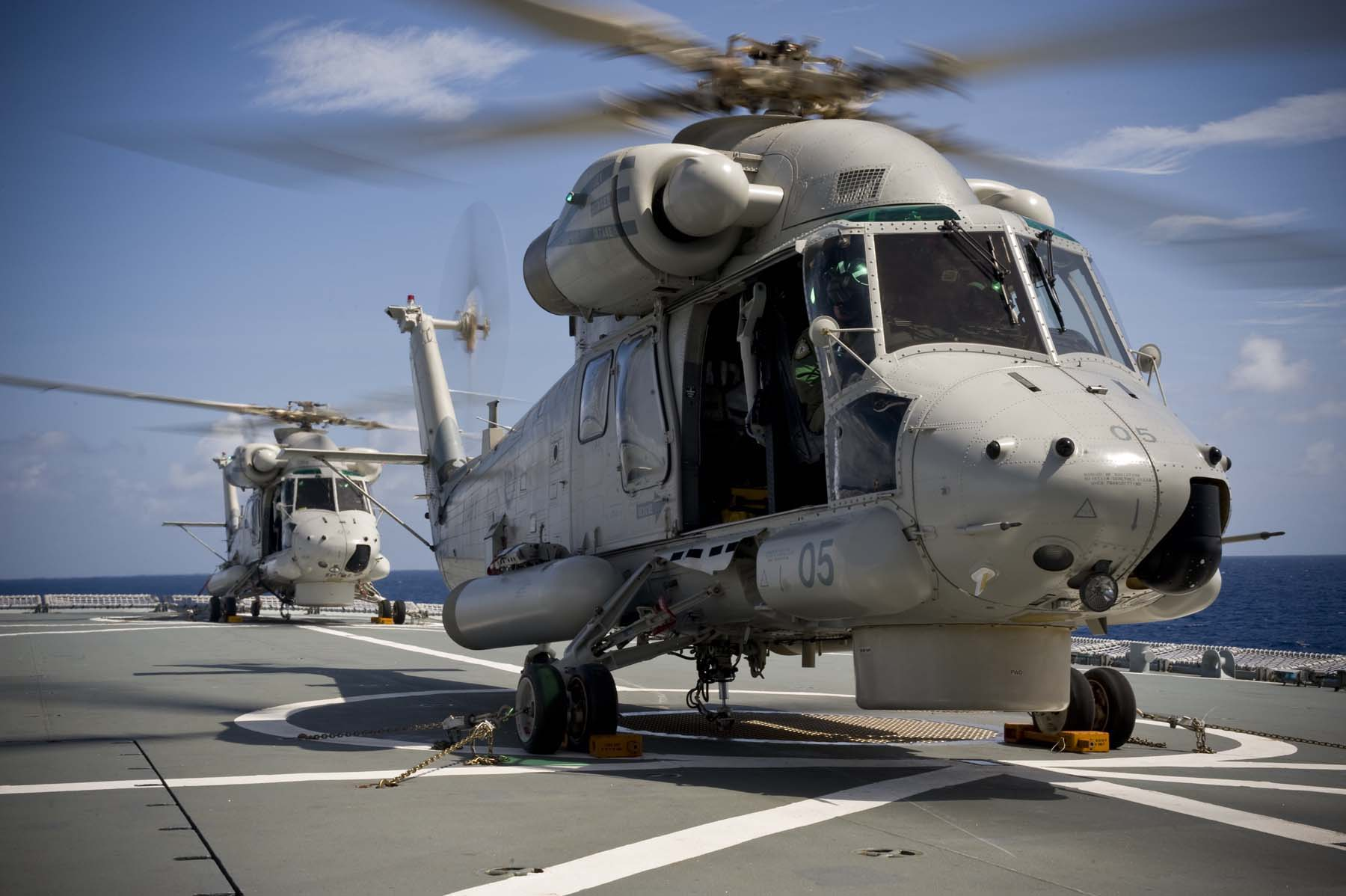
Two SH-2G on HMNZS Canterbury on a disaster relief exercise, 2009

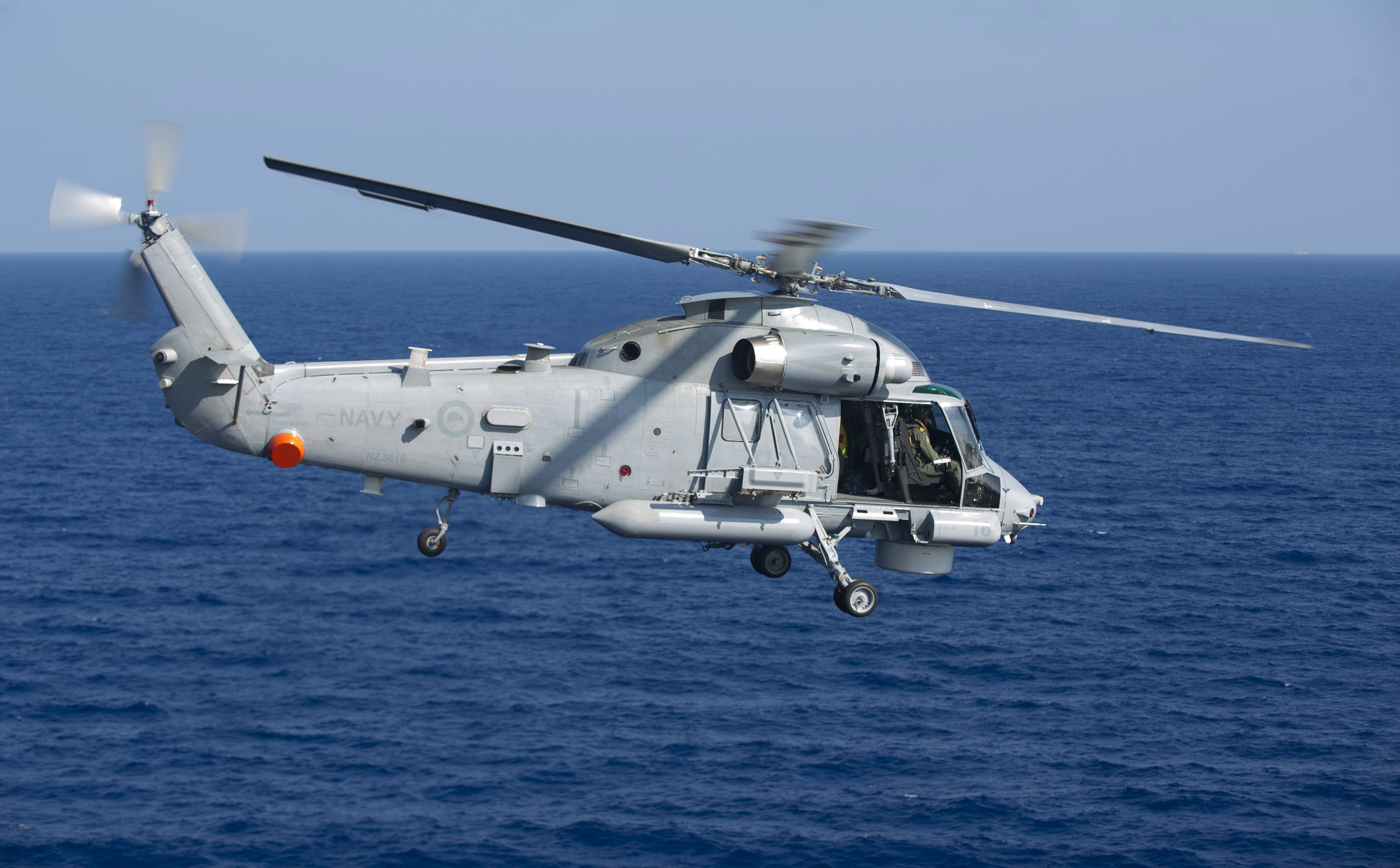
A Royal New Zealand Navy SH-2G(I) in 2016

The Royal New Zealand Navy (RNZN) replaced its Westland Wasps with four interim SH-2F Seasprites (ex-US Navy), to operate with Anzac-class frigates until the fleet of five new SH-2G Super Seasprites were delivered. The Navy air element was transferred to No. 6 Squadron RNZAF at RNZAF Base Auckland in Whenuapai in October 2005. RNZN Seasprites have seen service in East Timor.

New Zealand purchased five SH-2Gs at the same time as Australia. However, New Zealand opted for new-build airframes that were outfitted with different avionics. The SH-2G purchase was completed at NZ$12 million under the $338 million budgeted (excluding GST). The first RNZN SH-2G(NZ) was delivered in mid-2001, and the last was delivered February 2003. The Royal New Zealand Navy (RNZN) operates the type from its two Anzac-class frigates, two Protector-class offshore patrol vessels, and the multi-role vessel HMNZS Canterbury. They were initially operated by the Naval Support Flight of No. 3 Squadron RNZAF, but now from No. 6 Squadron RNZAF.

An urgent operational need was for RNZAF to use the FH MAG 58 machine gun on the helicopter, and this was fielded by 2008.

In May 2012, Defence Minister Jonathan Coleman announced that Cabinet had given Defence officials approval to negotiate with Kaman Corporation for the 11 helicopters and flight simulator from the canceled Australian SH-2G(A) Super Seasprite project. It is thought the 11 helicopters, worth NZ$1.4 billion in 2008, would cost New Zealand between NZ$130 million to NZ$230 million. A decision to purchase ten of the helicopters for $NZ242 million was announced on 19 April 2013. Eight of the aircraft will enter service with the RNZAF to replace the existing five Seasprites, and the remaining two will be used as a source of spare parts.

The New Zealand Ministry of Defence (MoD) accepted the first of the helicopters in the United States on 1 December 2014, and two more were delivered to Auckland in early 2015. Deliveries were completed by the end of 2015. All the aircraft were in service by 2016. The NZDF's five SH-2G(NZ) Seasprites were officially retired on 14 April 2016, and conducted their last flight on 21 April after serving since August 2001. They were replaced with eight re-manufactured SH-2G(I) models, allowing the Navy to embark up to three helicopters from ships at once instead of two. The "I" model also replaces the AGM-65 Maverick with the AGM-119 Penguin anti-ship missile.

New Zealand's five SH-2G(NZ) models were sold to the Peruvian Navy in October 2014 and replaced by the eight SH-2G(I) models.

On 24 April 2023, the New Zealand MoD announced that they are seeking replacements for the Seasprite. From mid-2023, the NZDF initiated a Seasprite Sustainment Work Program to reduce the operational fleet from eight to five. As of 2024, the fleet may be withdrawn as part of defence budget cutbacks. On 21 August 2025, New Zealand announced its intention to purchase five MH-60R Seahawks to replace its SH-2G(I) fleet.

=== Peru ===
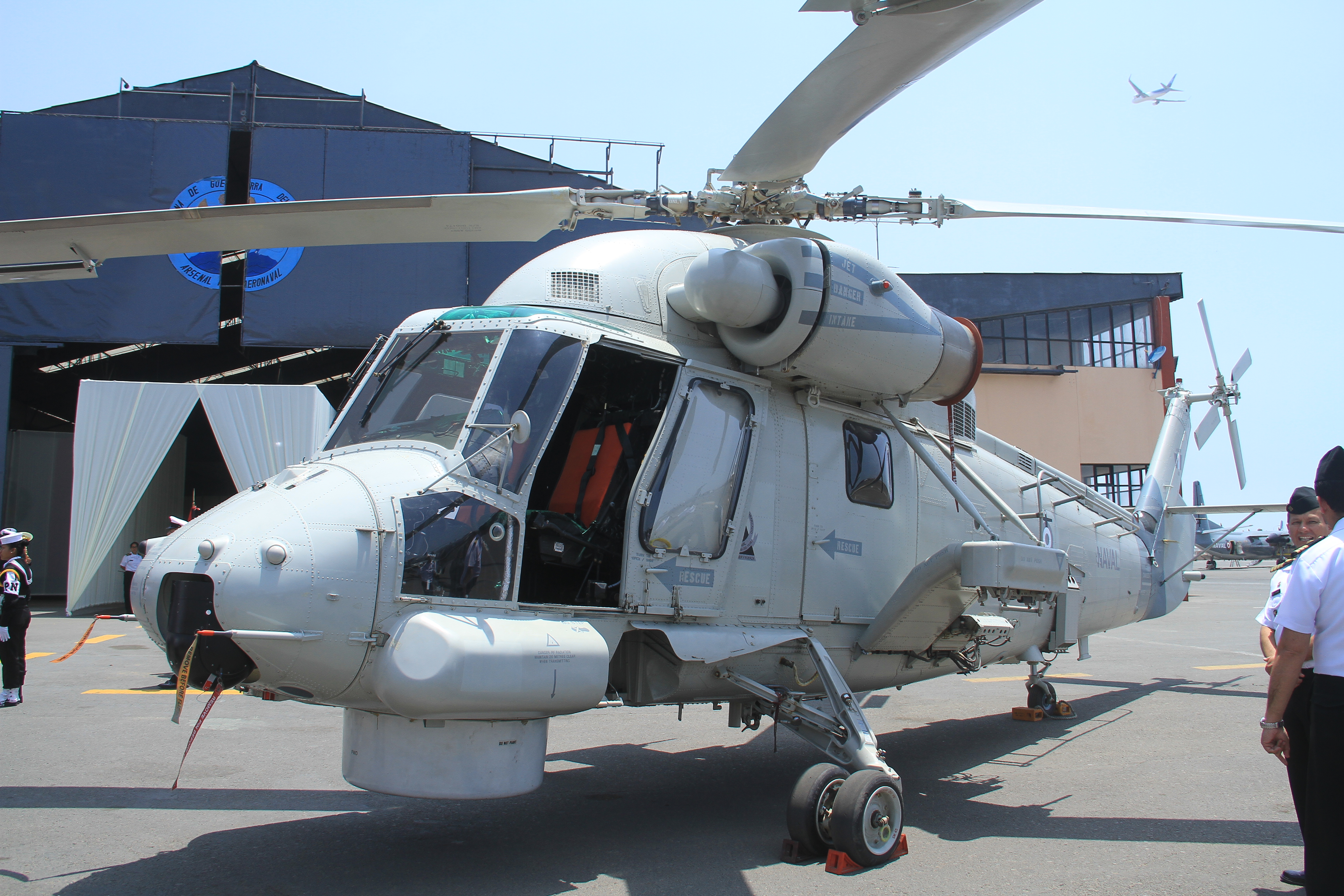
Peruvian Navy SH-2G Super Sea Sprite

Four ex-New Zealand SH-2Gs were re-manufactured and upgraded by Kaman before they were introduced to service with the Peruvian Navy. The "implementation phase" of Peru's Seasprite purchase concluded in 2018. The helicopters will be operated from the Navy's Lupo-class frigates.

=== Poland ===
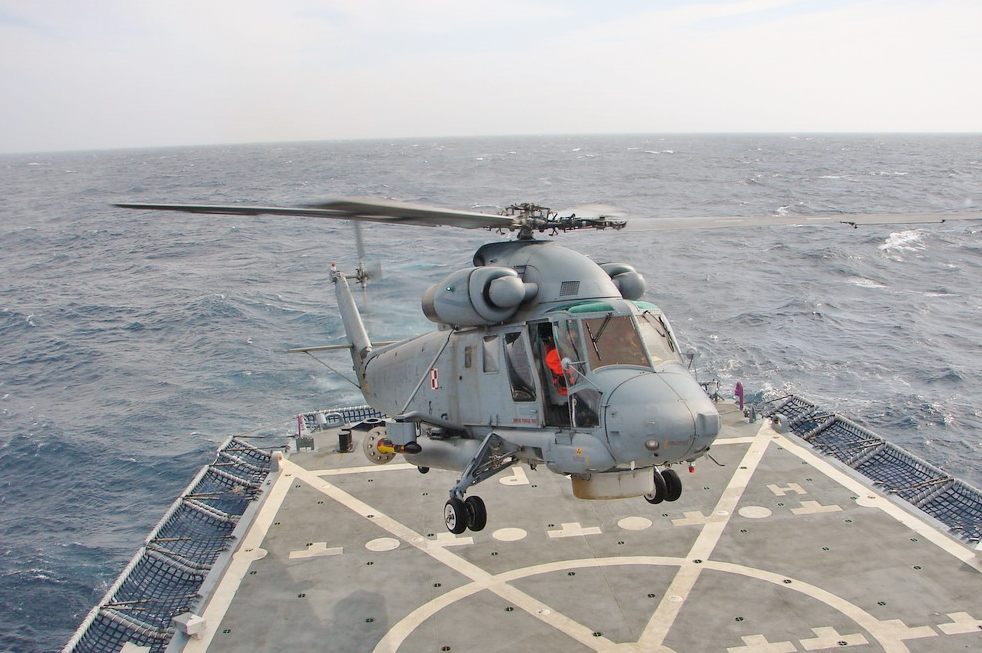
A Polish SH-2G Super Seasprite in 2006

The Polish Navy operates four of these aircraft, which were included in the purchase of two Oliver Hazard Perry-class frigates from the United States Navy. The frigates are now operating as ORP Generał Tadeusz Kościuszko and Generał Kazimierz Pułaski. In 2007 they were modified to carry one MU90 Impact torpedo and a 7.62 mm PK machine gun on pivot mounting.

=== United States ===
Beginning in 1991, the US Navy received 24 SH-2Gs, which were assigned to US Navy Reserve units. The Super Seasprite entered service with HSL-84 in 1993. The SH-2 served in some 600 Navy deployments and flew 1.5 million flight hours. The Navy Reserve squadron HSL-84 retired the last of the helicopters in June 2001.

== Variants ==
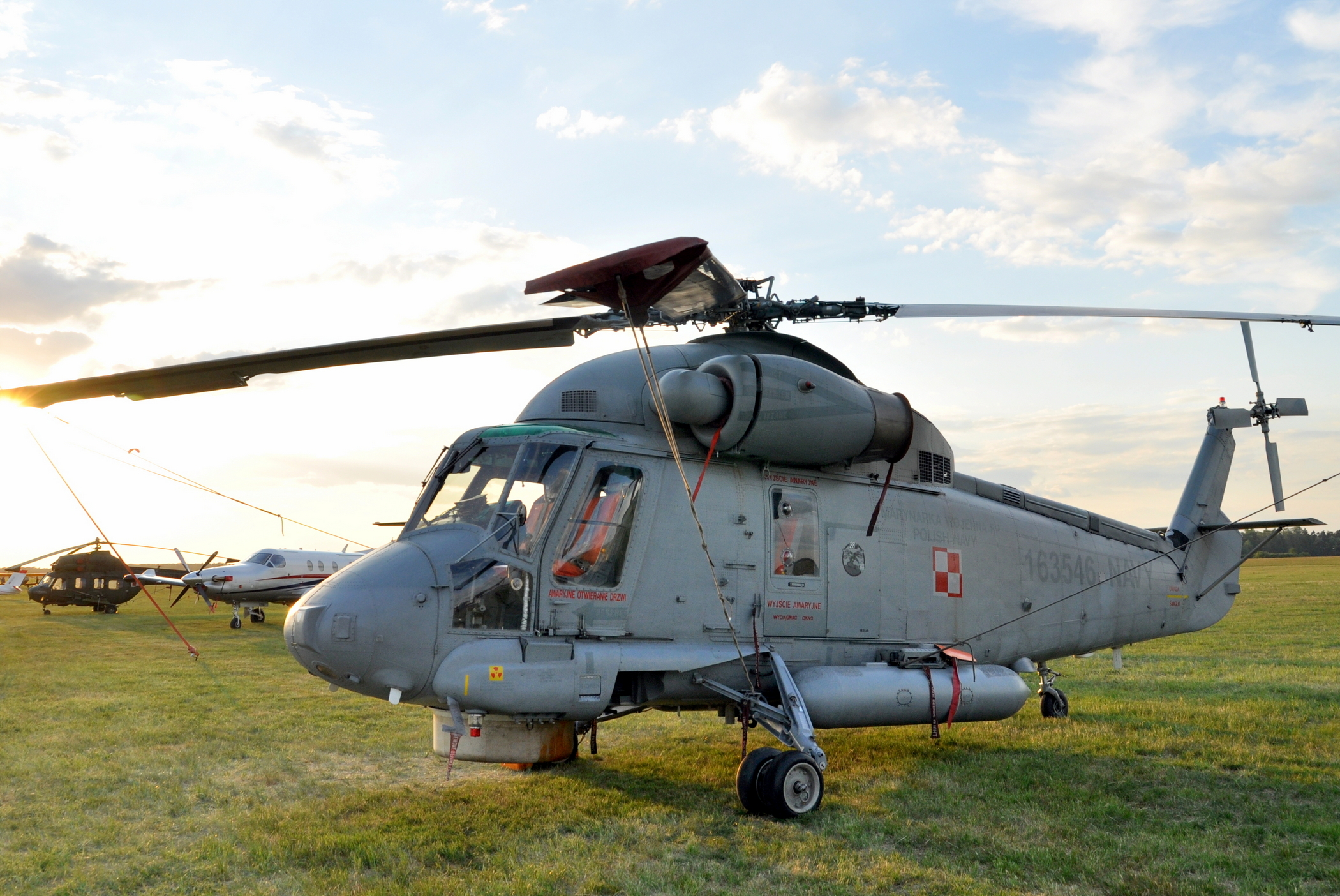
SH-2G of the Polish Navy

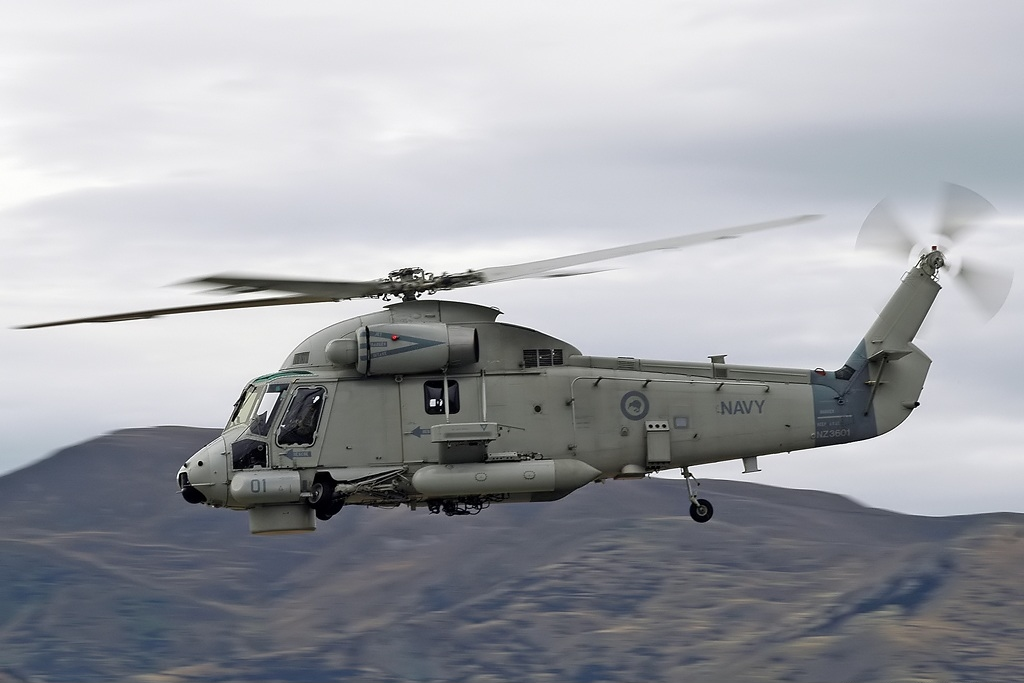
SH-2G of the Royal New Zealand Navy, 2006

YSH-2G
SH-2G prototype.
SH-2G Super Seasprite
Anti-submarine warfare helicopter, powered by two 1,723-shp (1,285-kW) General Electric T700-GE-401 turboshaft engines.
SH-2G(A)
Export version for Australia, upgraded former US Navy SH-2F.
SH-2G(E)
Export version for Egypt, upgraded former US Navy SH-2F.
SH-2G(M)
Proposed export version for Malaysia.
SH-2G(NZ)
Export version for New Zealand. Sold to Peru.
SH-2G(I)
Redesignated SH-2G(A) sold to New Zealand.

== Operators ==
Egypt

- Egyptian Navy 10 SH-2G(E)

New Zealand

- Royal New Zealand Navy 5 SH-2G(I)

Peru

- Peruvian Navy 5 SH-2G(NZ)

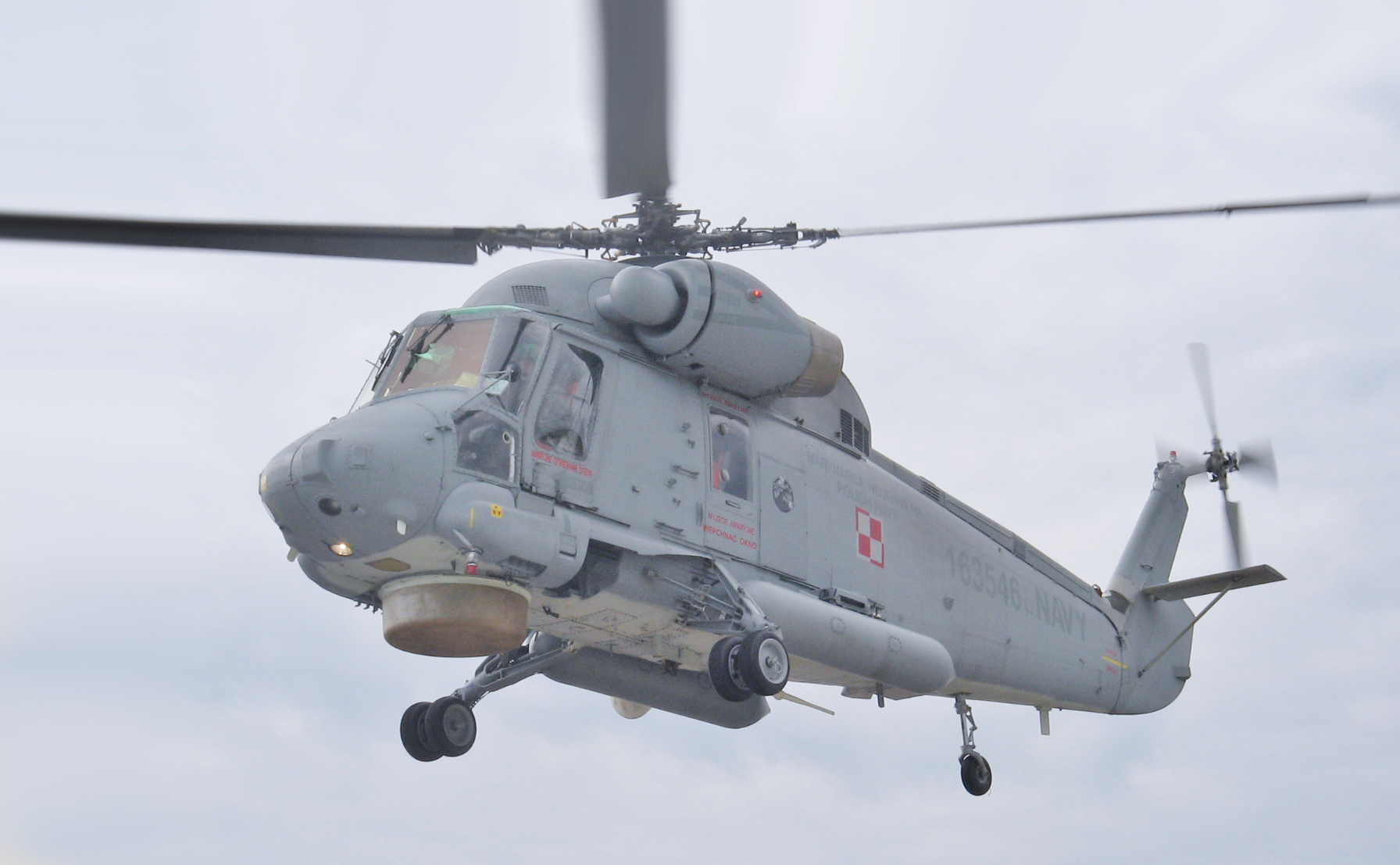
A Polish SH-2G

=== Former operators ===
Australia

- Royal Australian Navy

United States

- United States Navy

Poland

- Polish Navy

== Aircraft on display ==
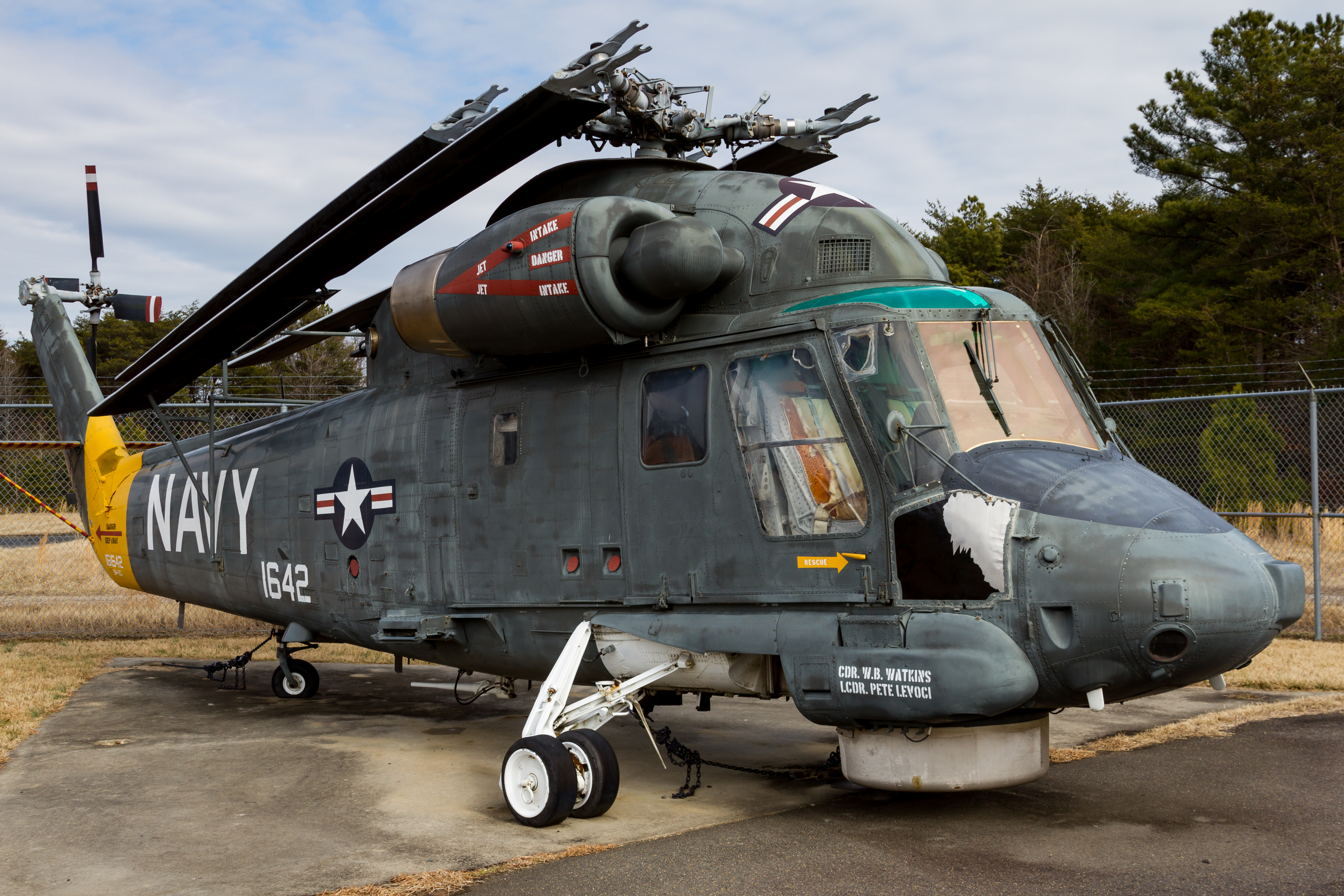
SH-2G Super Seasprite at the Patuxent River Naval Air Museum

- 161642 – SH-2G on static display at the Patuxent River Naval Air Museum in Lexington Park, Maryland.
- 162576 – SH-2G on static display at the Wings of Freedom Aviation Museum in Willow Grove, Pennsylvania.

== Specifications (SH-2G) ==
Data from The International Directory of Military Aircraft

General characteristics

- Crew: 3 (USN: pilot, co-pilot/tactical coordinator (TACCO), sensor operator (SENSO)) (RNZN: pilot, observer and helicopter loadmaster)
- Capacity: 4,390 lb (1,991 kg) load
- Length: 52 ft 9 in (15.9 m)
- Height: 15 ft 0 in (4.5 m)
- Empty weight: 9,200 lb (4,170 kg)
- Max takeoff weight: 13,500 lb (6,120 kg)
- Rotor systems: 4 blades on main rotor and tail rotor. Main rotor blades are controlled by servo flaps rather than a swashplate
- Powerplant: 2 × T700-GE-401/401C turboshaft, 1,723 shp (1,285 kW) each
- Main rotor diameter: 45 ft 0 in (13.4 m)

Performance

- Maximum speed: 138 kn (159 mph, 256 km/h)
- Cruise speed: 120 kn (138 mph, 222 km/h)
- Never exceed speed: 150 kn (173 mph, 278 km/h)
- Range: 540 nmi (869 mi, 1,000 km)
- Endurance: 5 hr with 2 external tanks
- Service ceiling: 18,000 ft (3,000 m)
- Rate of climb: 2,500 ft/min (12.7 m/s)

Armament

- Guns: FN MAG General-purpose machine gun x 1 (equipped on the right door only for the Royal New Zealand Navy)
- Hardpoints: Four total, two inboard pylons behind the main landing gear (for auxiliary fuel tanks and torpedoes) and two outboard pylons for Torpedoes and missiles.
- Missiles: Export type only, equipped with 2 AGM-65D air-to-ground missiles or 2 AGM-119 short-range anti-ship missiles
- Torpedoes: 2× Mk 46 or Mk 50 ASW torpedoes

== See also ==
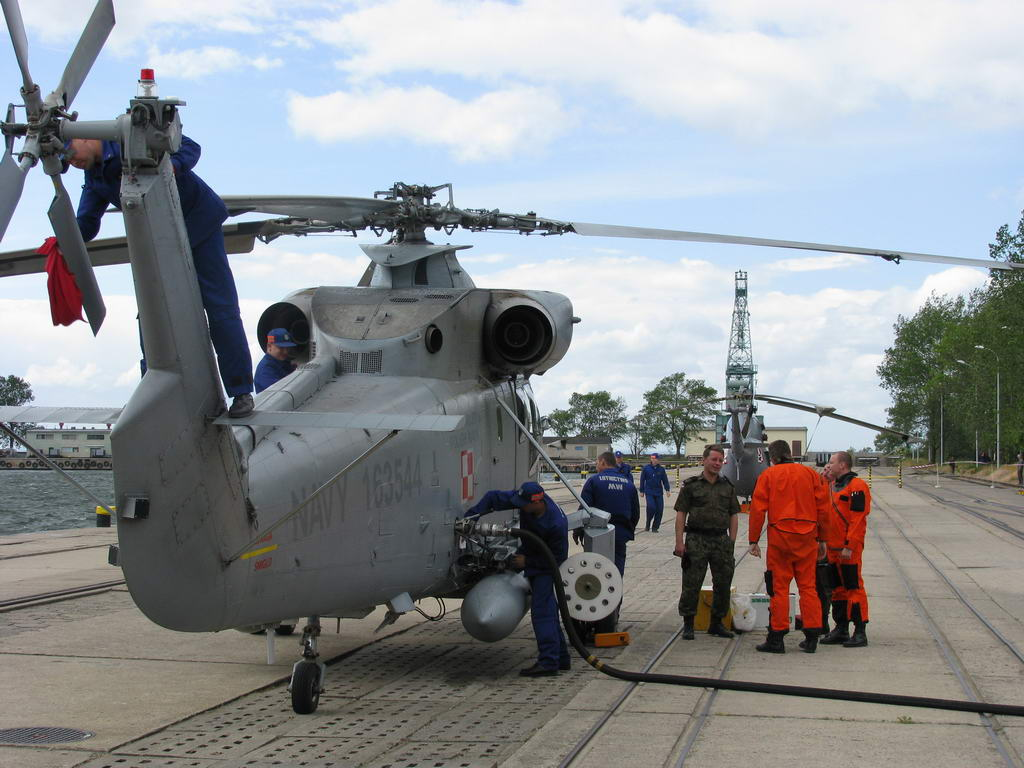
SH-2G gets some maintenance and fuel

Related development

- Kaman SH-2 Seasprite

Aircraft of comparable role, configuration, and era

- Sikorsky SH-60 Seahawk
- Westland Lynx
- Kamov Ka-27

Related lists

- List of military aircraft of the United States
- List of aircraft of the Royal New Zealand Air Force and Royal New Zealand Navy
