= Project Protector =

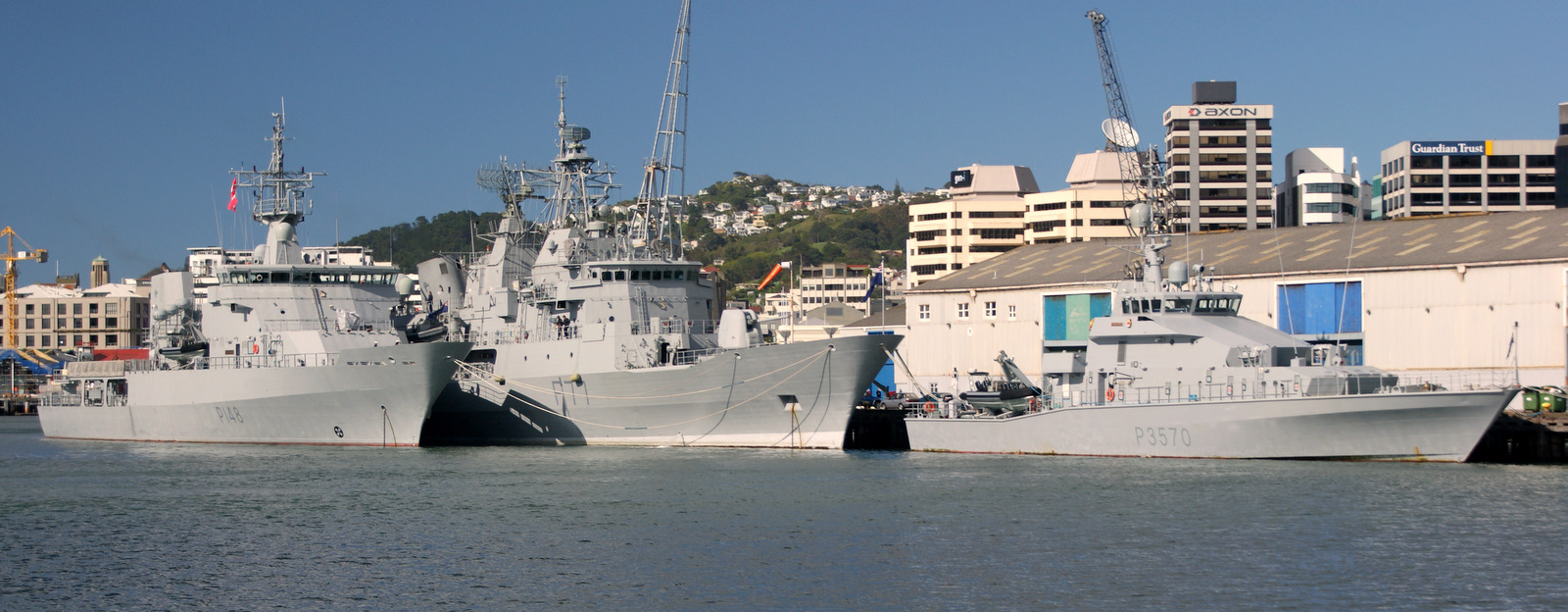
The offshore patrol vessel Otago (left), frigate Te Kaha (centre), and inshore patrol vessel HMNZS Taupo (right) in Wellington in 2010. Otago and Taupo were developed under Project Protector.

Project Protector was a Royal New Zealand Navy (RNZN) procurement project that was undertaken during the 2000s. At the start of the decade, the New Zealand government tasked the New Zealand Defence Force to develop an equal combat, peacekeeping, and disaster relief capability, in which the RNZN was to focus on conducting sealift operations and patrols of the Economic Exclusion Zone. A series of reviews found that the RNZN was lacking in these capabilities, and Project Protector was established to acquire three new ship types: a single multi-role sealift ship, two offshore patrol vessels, and four inshore patrol vessels. After a two-year information-gathering and tender process, an Australian company, Tenix Defence, was selected as the primary contractor.

The sealift ship, HMNZS Canterbury, was built by Dutch company Merwede Shipyard in Rotterdam, and based on a commercial roll-on/roll-off ferry built for the Isle of Man. In mid-2007, the ship became the first Project Protector vessel to enter service, but problems during her early career required a remedial program to be put in place. The two Protector class offshore patrol vessels (OPVs) were built by Tenix at its Melbourne, Australia, shipyard to a design used by the Irish Naval Service, but several design mistakes resulted in the ships being 100 tonnes heavier than planned, and the OPVs were not commissioned until 2010. Four Lake-class inshore patrol vessels (IPVs) were built at Tenix's North Island shipyard, and entered service during 2009. Because of the delay in bringing the ships to active duty (all seven were due into service by the end of 2007), BAE Systems Australia (which had acquired Tenix in 2008) was required to pay a compensatory settlement to the RNZN in early 2010.

== Background ==
In the June 2000 Defence Policy Framework (DPF), the New Zealand government identified that the New Zealand Defence Force had to be equally capable of both combat and peacekeeping operations. From the navy's perspective, prioritisation was given to sealift and transport of New Zealand Army units and equipment, and to maritime surveillance of both New Zealand's 3,000,000-square-kilometre (1,200,000 sq mi) Economic Exclusion Zone (EEZ), and the EEZs of allied South Pacific nations. The RNZN was also required to develop a non-military operational capability that would allow it to undertake tasks such as disaster relief, throughout the region.

To identify if the RNZN could meet the capabilities identified in the DPF, the government initiated the Maritime Patrol Review (MPR), which was released in February 2001, followed by the more ship-specific Maritime Forces Review (MFR), which commenced in May 2001 and was released in January 2002. These reviews were not Ministry of Defence-only affairs: input was sought from other government ministries and bodies, including the Ministry of Fisheries, the Ministry of Foreign Affairs and Trade, the New Zealand Customs Service, the New Zealand Police, and Maritime New Zealand. These reviews identified that the RNZN did not meet the capability requirements identified in the DPF. The main areas identified as lacking were patrol capabilities, both in the EEZ and inshore, and a sealift capability to transport personnel, equipment, and supplies throughout the region for both military and relief operations. The MFR also found that the navy's two Anzac class frigates were both overcapable and too few in number to effectively patrol New Zealand's waters, and that tying them up on these duties prevented their use on more suitable deployments.

Around the same time as the reviews, the RNZN was looking to replace the training frigate HMNZS Canterbury, which was due to be retired in 2005. The decision not to order the additional two frigates suggested under the Anzac acquisition project and the increased operational tempo during the early 2000s was straining the navy's capabilities and needed to be addressed.

== Requisitions ==
The capability gaps identified by the MFR prompted the instigation of Project Protector. The "fleet renewal project" consisted of three different procurement projects to meet the identified capability requirements: a class of offshore patrol vessels to undertake EEZ operations and relieve the pressure on the Anzacs, improved inshore patrol capabilities (either through a new ship class or upgrades to the existing Moa class patrol boats), and a multi-role sealift ship. The aim was to bring all three projects under a unified umbrella, administered by a single prime contractor.

In July 2002, the New Zealand government sent details of Project Protector to 60 shipbuilders and ship design companies, and invited submissions from interested parties. Six companies were selected from the 21 responses received by the 13 September 2002 deadline: BAE Systems (partnering with Austal and Appledore Shipbuilders), Blohm + Voss, DSA (a collaboration between Damen Shipyards, Schelde Shipbuilding, and Australian Defence Industries), Singapore Technologies Marine, Tenix Defence, and Vosper Thornycroft Shipbuilding. On 26 May 2003, these six were invited to submit more detailed proposals, and were given until 31 October 2003 to respond.

Evaluation was predicted to be completed by early 2004, with a contract awarded by mid-2004. Tenix Defence was identified as the best supplier in April 2004, and the contract between the Ministry of Defence and Tenix was signed on 29 July 2004. The project was predicted in 2003 to cost NZ$500 million. Project Protector was the most complex project ever undertaken by New Zealand, with three ship classes (plus embarked small craft) under construction across three nations. All three ships were to be built to commercial standards, and maintained like commercial vessels. In order to operate the new ships, the RNZN had to recruit and train an additional 245 personnel.

All seven ships were planned to enter service across 2007. However, by August 2008, only the sealift ship HMNZS Canterbury had entered service, and that had occurred six months behind schedule. The entry into service date for the six patrol boats was pushed back to the end of 2008. Further delays meant that the last Project Protector vessel did not enter service until mid-2010. In early 2010, the RNZN received a NZ$86.4 million settlement from BAE Systems Australia (which had acquired Tenix in 2008) as compensation for the delayed entry-into-service dates of the seven ships, along with defects in the sealift ship design, problems including a 100-ton displacement increase in the offshore patrol vessels, and other issues across the project.

=== Sealift ship ===
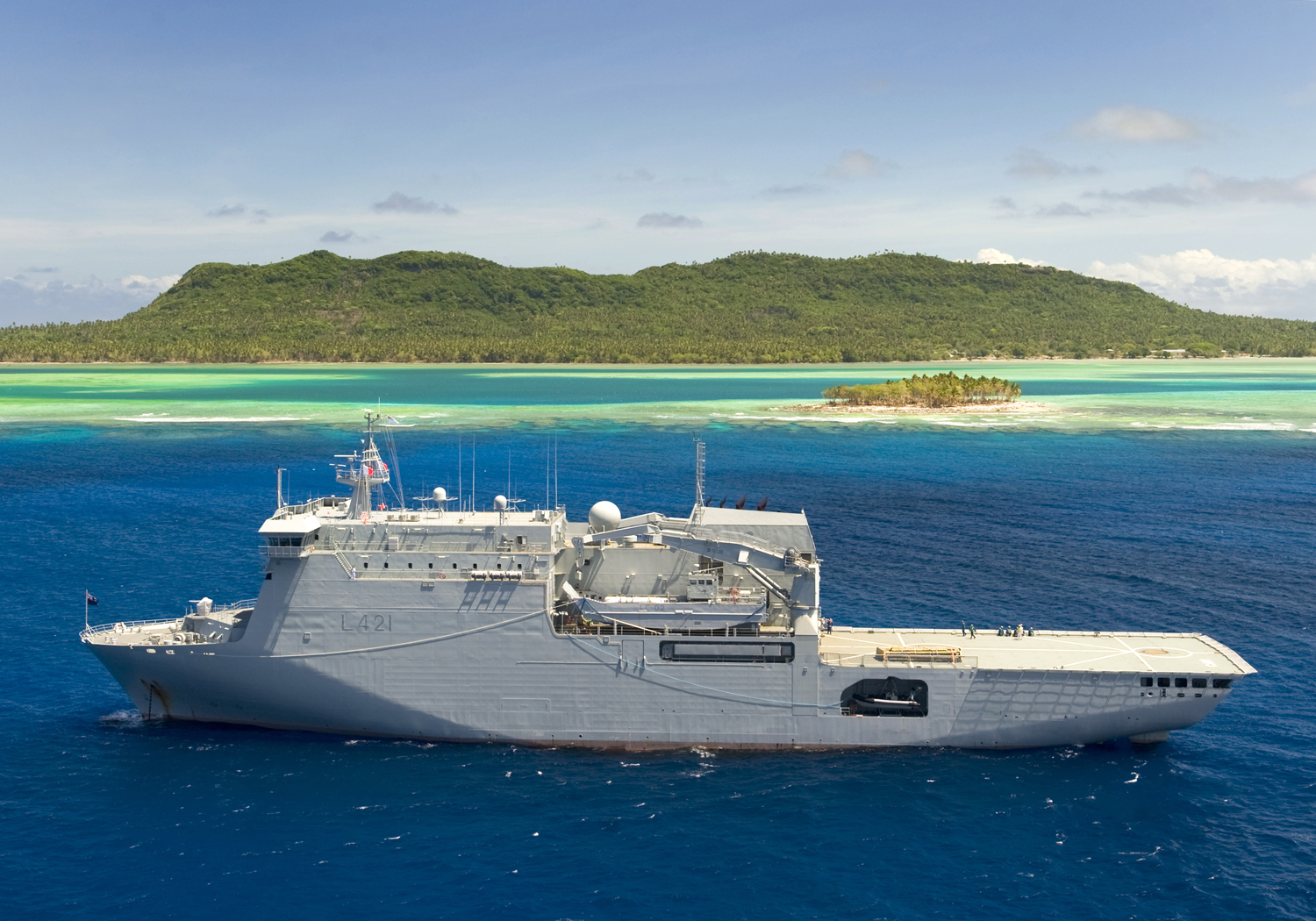
Canterbury operating off Samoa during Pacific Partnership 2011

Project Protector called for a multi-role vessel with a tactical sealift capability, which would be used throughout the South Pacific region for disaster and humanitarian relief, peace support, military support, and development assistance support. The vessel would also serve as the RNZN's primary at-sea training ship after the frigate Canterbury was decommissioned. A limited patrol and response capability was also desired. The RNZN had previously tried to establish a sealift capability with the acquisition of HMNZS Charles Upham in the mid-1990s, but attempts to convert the former roll-on/roll-off freighter were unsuccessful, and the ship was decommissioned in 2001.

The ship had to be available for 160 days at sea per year, plus another 130 days berthed but available for deployment. She had to be capable of transporting a New Zealand Army heavy company and its equipment (identified in the initial proposal as 250 personnel, 315 lane metres of vehicles, and 33 TEU of equipment and stores), and be able to transfer the personnel and equipment between the ship and shore. The vessel had to embark and operate one SH-2G Super Seasprite, and be fitted with aviation facilities capable of operating two Cougar-size helicopters or one Chinook-size helicopter. Although the review called for the ship to be armed with a 40-to-76-millimetre (1.6 to 3.0 in) gun, the 2003 request for proposals stipulated a 25-millimetre (0.98 in) gun; this would help keep the project within the NZ$500 million budget, and provide ammunition commonality with the M242 Bushmaster fitted to the Army's LAV III infantry fighting vehicle.

The multi-role vessel HMNZS Canterbury was the first ship completed under Project Protector. Based on MS Ben-my-Chree, a commercial roll-on/roll-off ferry, Canterbury has a displacement of 8,000 tonnes (7,900 long tons; 8,800 short tons), a top speed of 19 knots (35 km/h; 22 mph), and a range of 6,000 nautical miles (11,000 km; 6,900 mi). The vessel is capable of transporting 250 troops, up to 40 vehicles in 403 lane metres of space, 33 ISO 20-foot containers (including eight dedicated ammunition containers) and 20 NATO pallets of supplies. Loading is performed wharfside through stern and side access ramps, or via two 60-tonne (59-long-ton; 66-short-ton) cranes. Two 23-metre (75 ft) landing craft medium (LCM) are carried by Canterbury for situations where wharf unloading is unavailable; these can be launched and recovered via the cranes, while "marriage blocks" and "flippers" help the LCMs dock with the stern ramp. One Super Seasprite and up to four NHIndustries NH90 helicopters can be hangared aboard. The ship is fitted with a single 25 mm Bushmaster gun in a Typhoon mounting and two 12.7 mm machine guns for self-defence. Canterbury's hull is strengthened to Finnish-Swedish ice class 1C, allowing her to operate in the Ross Dependency.

The ship was built by the Merwede Shipyard in Rotterdam, with steel cutting starting on 15 April 2005. It was launched in February 2006, and commenced sea trials in July. Handover to Tenix was expected to occur in August; the vessel would then sail to the Tenix shipyard at Williamstown, Victoria, Australia for fitting of military equipment. It was originally planned to have Canterbury commissioned into the RNZN during January 2007, but delays meant that the ship did not enter service until June 2007. Problems were encountered early in the ship's career, relating primarily to the RHIB alcove docks, which were in a position to be easily swamped, with resulting damage to the boats themselves. Seakeeping ability was also an issue. Most of the problems stemmed from the ship's parent design-a short, fat civilian ferry designed to operate in the calm Irish Sea, not on military deployments in deep ocean-and the failure of Tenix and the RNZN to address this during design and construction. A remedial program was initiated in 2008.

=== OPV ===
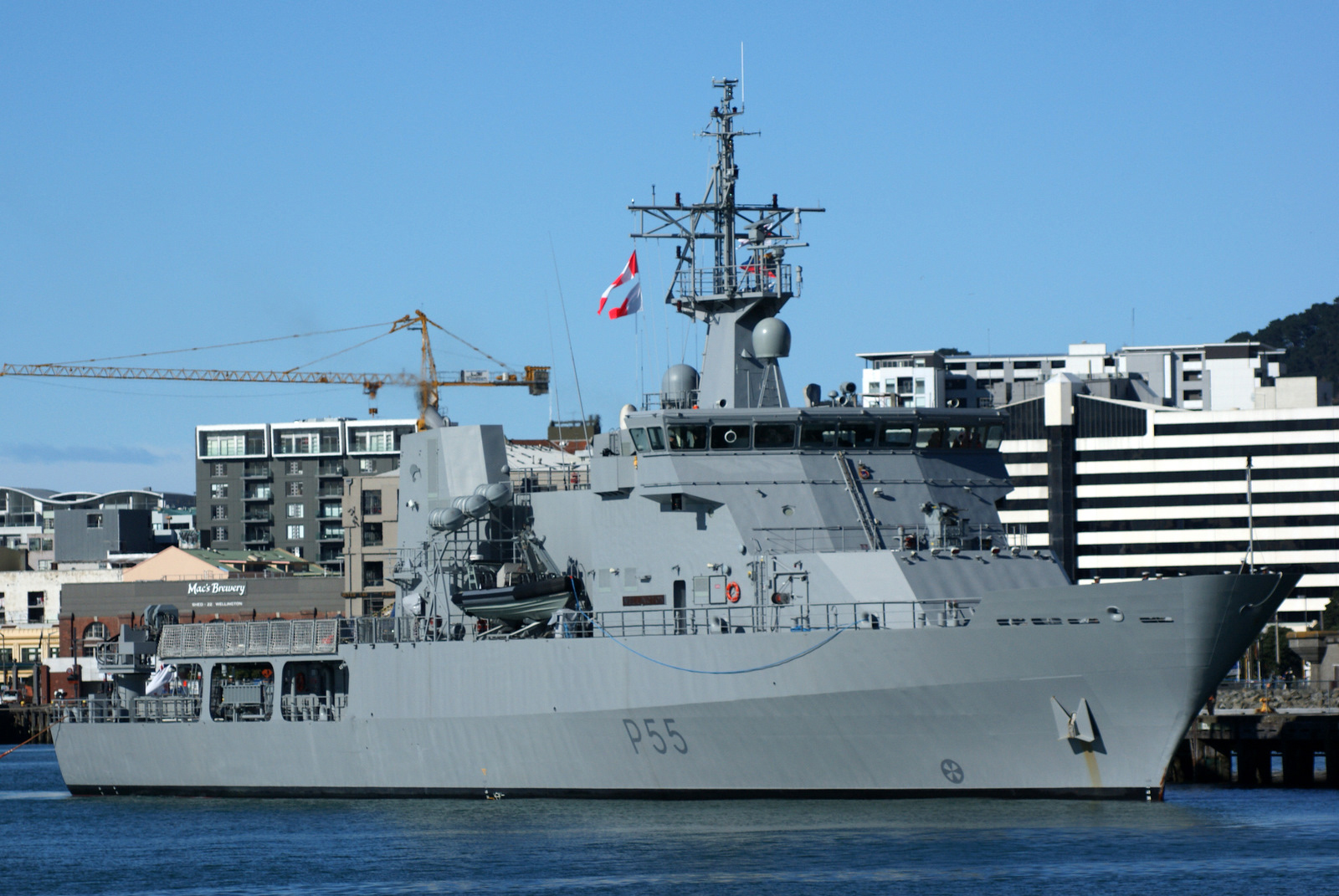
The offshore patrol vessel Wellington in Wellington Harbour during September 2010

Up until the reviews, offshore patrol of the nation's EEZ had been undertaken by the Anzac class frigates, which were both too few in number and overqualified for the duties; deploying them in this manner meant they were unavailable for higher intensity operations for which they were more suited. A new class of offshore patrol vessels (OPVs) was planned; these had to be capable of providing 420 ship-days per year of EEZ operations, and able to operate a Super Seasprite helicopter.

Two offshore patrol vessels, Wellington and Otago, were built by Tenix at Williamstown from hull modules fabricated at Williamstown and superstructure modules assembled at Whangārei, North Island, then shipped to Australia. The 1,740-tonne (1,710-long-ton; 1,920-short-ton) displacement, 85-metre (279 ft) long vessels were based on an Aker Marine design operated by the Irish Naval Service. The ships were fitted with an MSI-Defence Systems 25-millimetre (0.98 in) gun as main armament, and could embark and operate a helicopter. The patrol vessels' hulls were strengthened to Finnish-Swedish ice class 1C for operations in the Ross Dependency.

Work started on 22 February 2005. The OPVs were due to complete in April and October 2007. However, the ships were not launched until November 2006 and October 2007 respectively, and by December 2008 were yet to commission. The main problems were safety issues with the RHIBs and an extra 100 tons of weight over the design specifications. Wellington did not commission until May 2010; the last Project Protector ship to enter service.

=== IPV ===
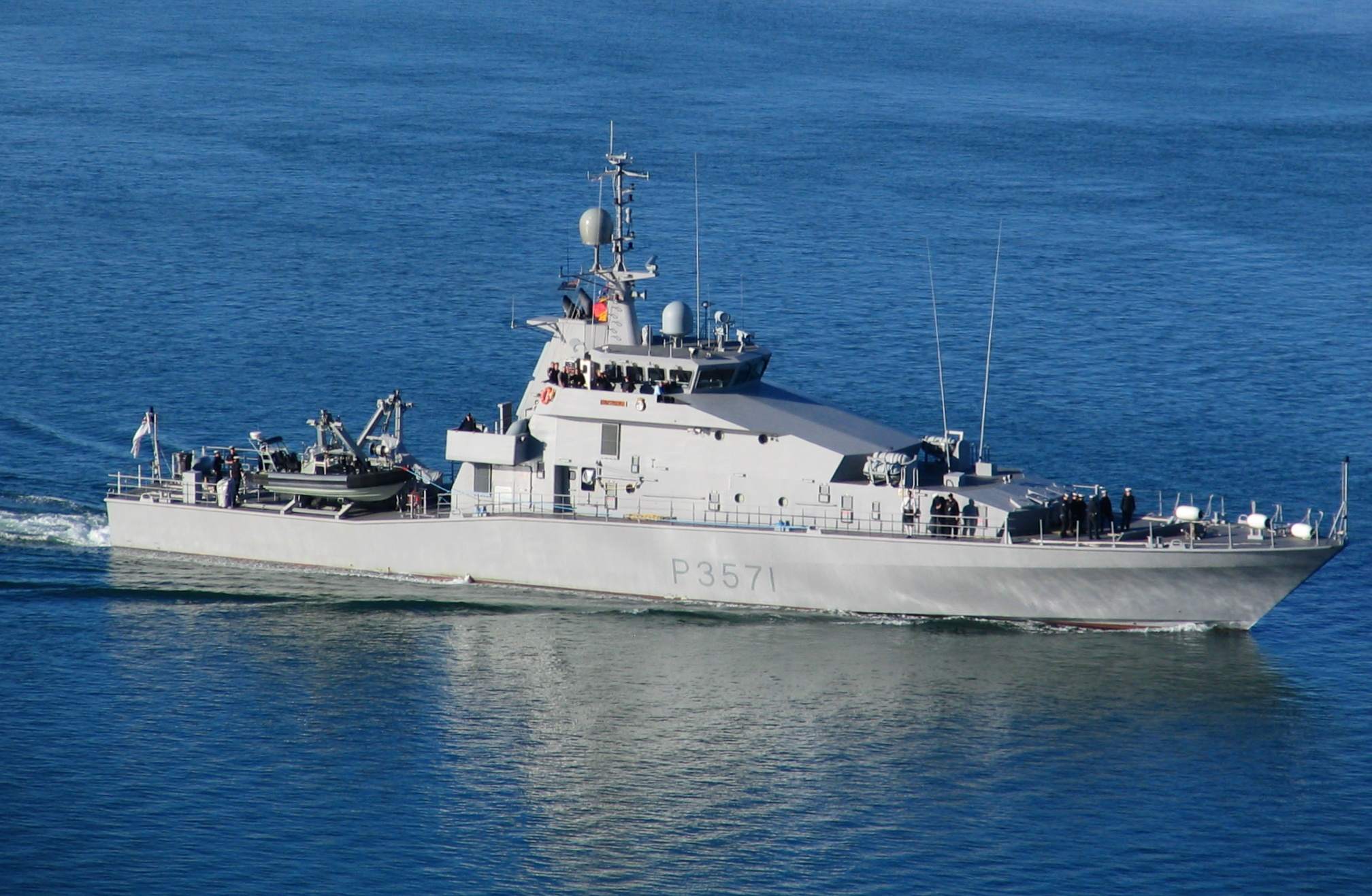
The inshore patrol vessel Hawea entering Otago Harbour in August 2009

Several inshore patrol vessels (IPVs) were required for surveillance and patrol work in New Zealand's inshore zone (defined as up to 24 nautical miles (44 km; 28 mi) from the shoreline). A minimum of 950 ship-days was required for these duties. It was initially thought that the IPV requirement could be met by modernising four of the Moa class patrol boats. They could not be updated to the standard required by the Maritime Forces Review, so new ships were instead ordered to replace them on a one-for-one basis.

The IPVs were based on a 56-metre (184 ft) search-and-rescue vessel class built by Tenix for the Philippine Coast Guard. The vessels had a 340-ton displacement, and were 55 metres (180 ft) long. They were only fitted with 12.7 mm machine guns instead of the 25 mm guns fitted to the other Project Protector ships. Four vessels were built at Tenix shipyard in Whangārei, North Island. The first IPV, HMNZS Rotoiti, was launched in July 2007, and during sea trials exceeded several design expectations: her maximum speed of 25 knots (46 km/h; 29 mph) was a knot higher than expected, she was capable of double her 3,000 nautical miles (5,600 km; 3,500 mi) designed range, and she had better seakeeping ability in heavy conditions than first thought. The last ship, HMNZS Taupo, was launched in August 2008. After the final patrol boat was completed, Tenix ceased operations at the Whangārei facility. Although there were some problems with the vessels, all four entered service during 2009.
