= Lake-class inshore patrol vessel =

Class of inshore patrol vessels

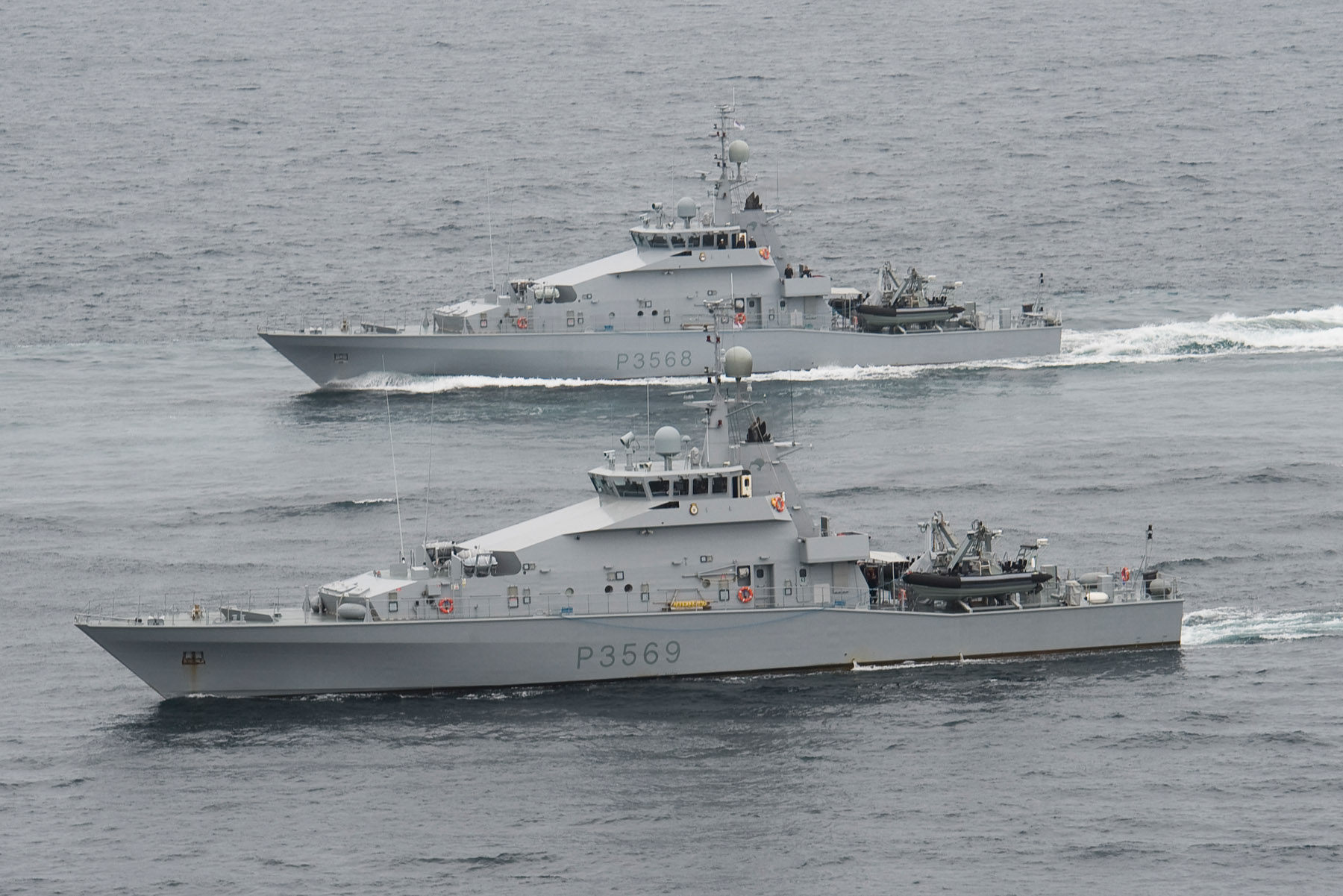
- HMNZS Rotoiti and HMNZS Pukaki in 2010

Class overview
- Name: Lake class
- Builders: Tenix Defence, Whangārei
- Operators: Royal New Zealand Navy; Irish Naval Service
- Preceded by: Moa class RNZN; Peacock-class corvette INS
- Cost: NZ$35.8 million (2008) per unit
- Built: 2005–2008
- In service: 2009–present
- In commission: 2009–present
- Completed: 4
- Active: 2 (New Zealand); 2 (Ireland)

General characteristics
- Type: Inshore patrol vessel
- Displacement: 340 tonnes (loaded)
- Length: 55 m (180 ft)
- Beam: 9 m (30 ft)
- Draught: 2.9 m (9.5 ft)
- Propulsion: Two MAN B&W 12VP185 engines, each rated at 2,500 kW (3,400 hp) at 1,907 rpm; ZF 7640 NR gearboxes; Two controllable pitch propellers
- Speed: Top speed 25 knots (46 km/h; 29 mph); Patrol speed 16 knots (30 km/h; 18 mph)
- Range: 3,000 nautical miles (5,600 km; 3,500 mi)
- Boats & landing craft carried: 2 × RHIB with diesel-powered three-stage jet units
- Complement: 36 (includes 4 government agency staff and up to 12 others)
- Armament: 3 × 12.7 mm machine guns; Small arms

The Lake-class inshore patrol vessel (also known as the Rotoiti class and the Protector class) is a ship class of inshore patrol vessels (IPVs) of the Royal New Zealand Navy (RNZN) which replaced the RNZN's Moa-class patrol boats in 2007–2008. All four vessels were originally named after New Zealand lakes. Two of the ships were sold to Ireland in 2022.

Following long-running Navy retention problems in the wake of NZDF "civilianisation", two of the four vessels were tied up, inactive, in a 'Reduced Activity Period' for long periods between 2013 and 2018. In June 2019 the New Zealand Government announced that two of the patrol vessels would be withdrawn from service, and they were decommissioned in October that year. Both were later sold to the Irish Naval Service.

== Design and construction ==
Conceived as part of Project Protector, the Ministry of Defence acquisition project to acquire one multi-role vessel, two offshore and four inshore patrol vessels. The Project Protector vessels were to be operated by the RNZN to conduct tasks for and with the New Zealand Customs Service, the Department of Conservation, Ministry of Foreign Affairs and Trade, Ministry of Fisheries, Maritime New Zealand, and New Zealand Police. The future duties will include maritime surveillance and boarding, support to civilian agencies such as the customs service and search and rescue duties.

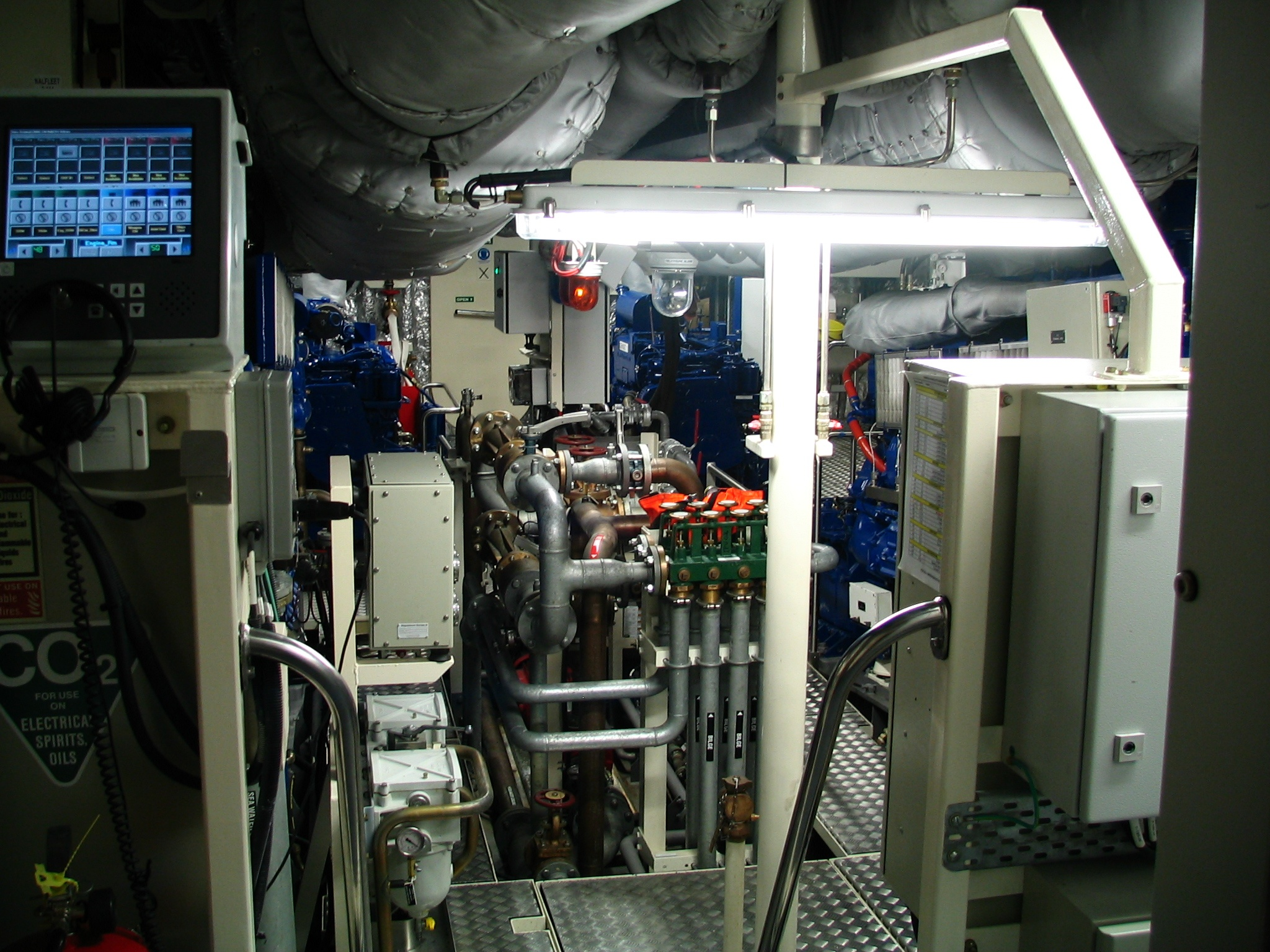
Engine room of HMNZS Hawea

The ships were built in Whangārei by Tenix Defence, and are based on a modified search and rescue vessel for the Philippine Coast Guard, with a different superstructure design. The cost for the four vessels was planned to be NZ$100 million. Friction stir welding was used in the construction of the superstructure, and Donovan Group being the first New Zealand company to use the technique, which is credited as having won them the contract for this part of the vessel's construction.

== Capabilities and features ==
The IPVs will normally be used for inshore tasks within 24 nautical miles (44 km; 28 mi) of the coastline. However, they will have operational ranges of 3,000 nautical miles (5,600 km; 3,500 mi). Together with their improved speed, this will be sufficient to intercept, for example, large off-shore fishing trawlers working illegally in New Zealand waters. Each vessel was intended to achieve 290 available patrol days per year.

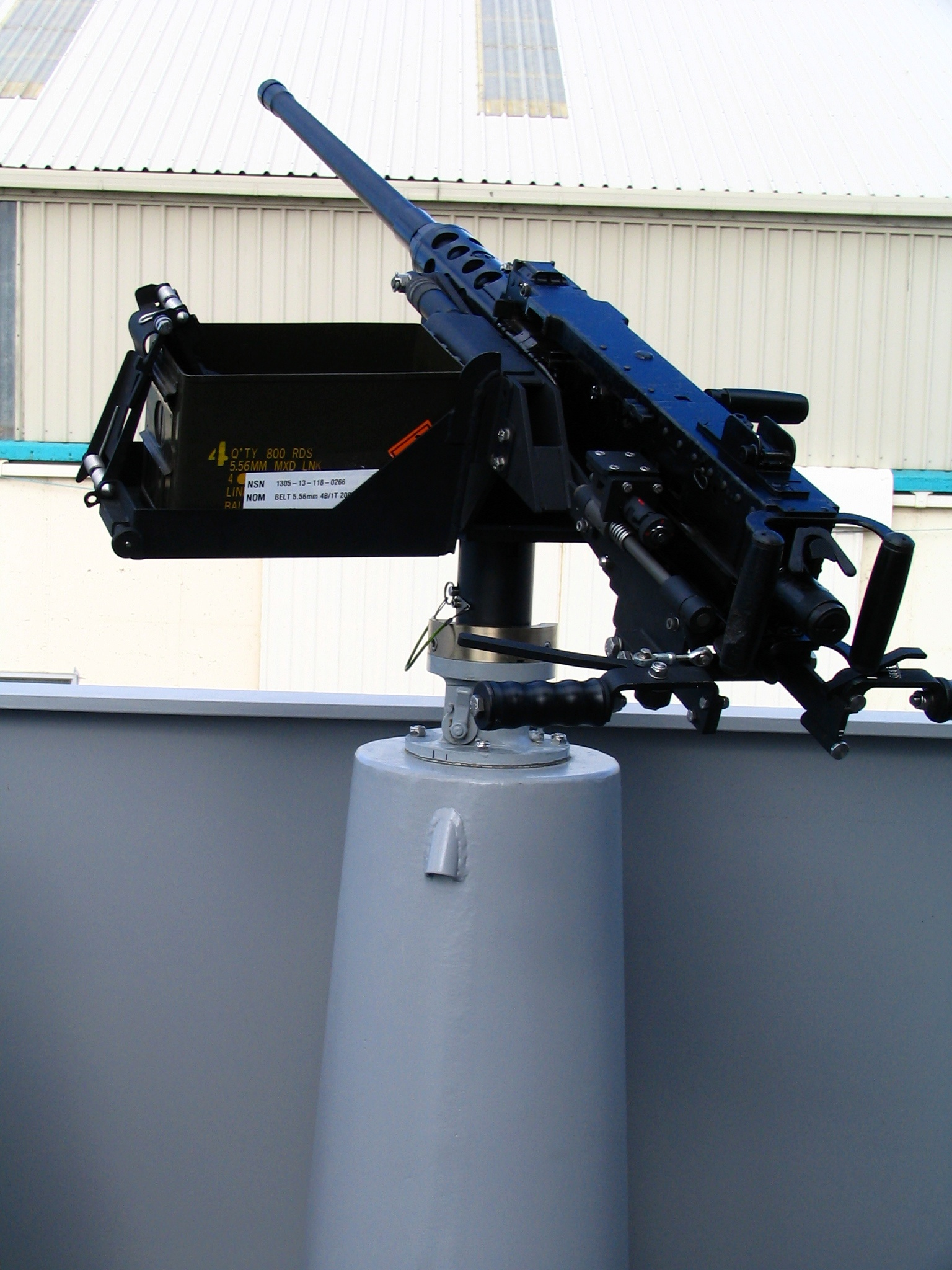
M2 12.7x99mm (.50-cal) machine gun on HMNZS Hawea

The ships were intended to have the ability to patrol (including receiving vertical replenishment) in up to sea state 5 (seas rough, waves 2.5–4 m (8.2–13.1 ft)) and have the ability to survive in conditions of up to sea state 8 (seas very high, waves 9–14 m (30–46 ft)). However, boat deployment and recovery will be limited to sea state 4 (seas moderate, waves 1.25–2.5 m (4.1–8.2 ft)). These parameters are much more capable than the Moa class which they replace. The shipbuilder claims "the vessel is more than capable of extending the Crown's operational envelope to Southern Ocean patrol duties".

== Irish Naval Service ==
In August 2021, an article in the Irish Examiner reported that Ireland's Department of Defence was exploring the possibility of purchasing two of the Lake class inshore patrol vessels for the Irish Naval Service. It was reported that the ships would be used for fisheries protection and patrolling in the Irish Sea following Britain's exit from the European Union. The Lake class vessels are seen as suitable for the calmer conditions of the Irish Sea, and would allow the larger offshore patrol vessels (OPVs) of the Irish naval fleet to focus on Atlantic Ocean operations.

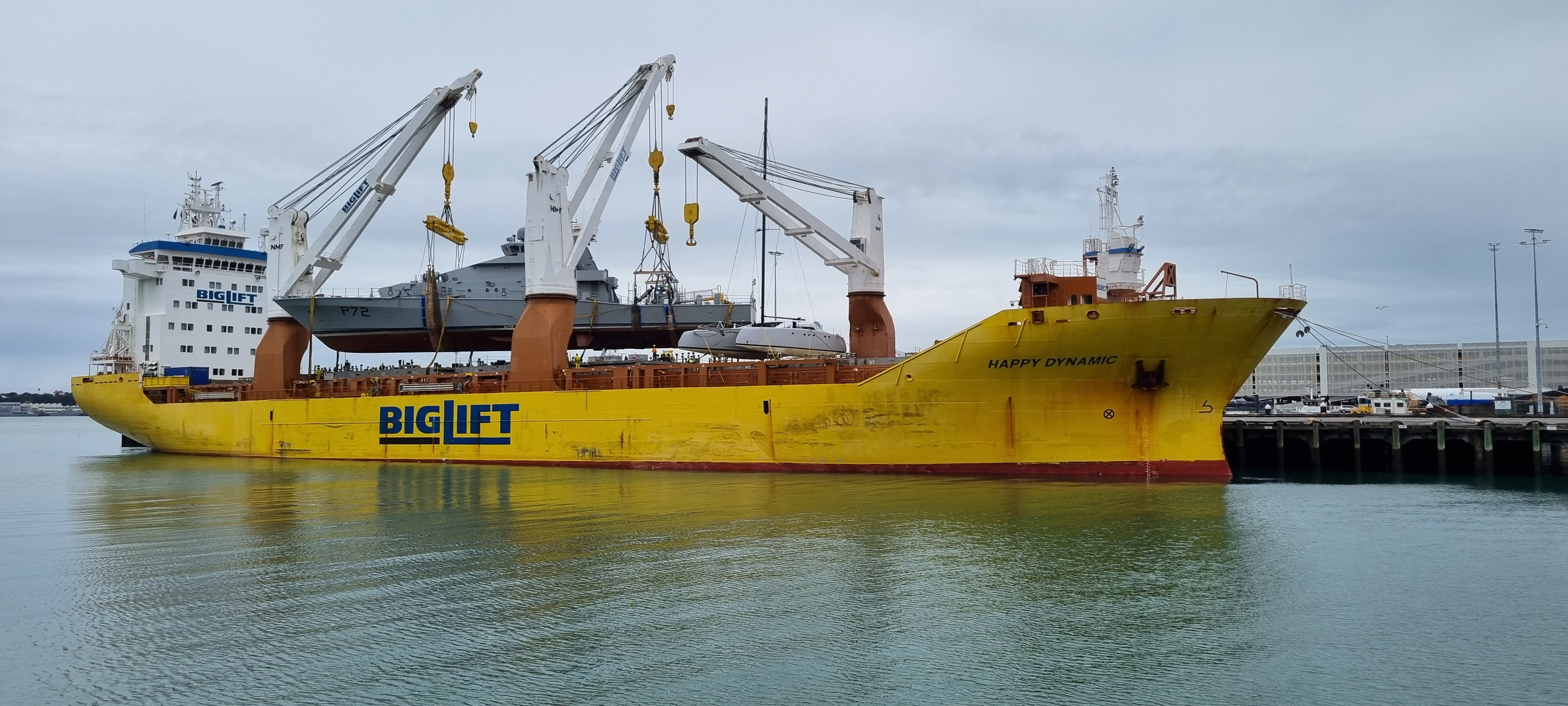
The former HMNZS Pukaki being loaded onto a heavy lift ship at Auckland in April 2023 ahead of being transported to Ireland

On 13 March 2022 the Irish Department of Defence confirmed the acquisition of the two retired Lake-class IPVs, HMNZS Rotoiti and HMNZS Pukaki for €26 million. The two Lake-class ships are due to replace the Irish Naval vessels LÉ Orla and LÉ Ciara. Both Lake-class IPVs underwent restoration work to bring them to Lloyd's Classification in New Zealand before they were transported to Ireland. The vessels arrived in Cork Harbour on 14 May 2023 after departing New Zealand in early April aboard the heavy lift vessel Happy Dynamic.

These ships are expected to operate primarily in the Irish Sea and off Ireland's South East coast and likely be based in the port of Dún Laoghaire in County Dublin. The vessels may also undergo an armament upgrade from the current three 12.7mm HMGs, to a 30mm or 40mm main gun. On 5 April 2024, the Irish Department of Defence announced that the vessels would be named LÉ Aoibhinn and LÉ Gobnait. The ships were commissioned on 4 September 2024 in Haulbowline.

== Ships in class ==
Royal New Zealand Navy
Name	Pennant no.	Commissioned	Decommissioned	Status
HMNZS Pukaki	P3568	14 May 2009	17 October 2019	Sold to Ireland
HMNZS Rotoiti	P3569	17 April 2009	17 October 2019	Sold to Ireland
HMNZS Taupo	P3570	29 May 2009		In active service
HMNZS Hawea	P3571	1 May 2009		In active service
Irish Naval Service
LÉ Aoibhinn (P71)	P71	4 September 2024		In active service
LÉ Gobnait (P72)	P72	4 September 2024		Not operational

== See also ==
- Protector-class offshore patrol vessel
- HMNZS Canterbury (L421)
