= Ian Bradley (naval officer) =

New Zealand politician

Ian Leslie Stuart Blenheim Bradley (10 August 1937 – 20 June 2015) was a regional councilor in Auckland, New Zealand and a former Commander and Temporary Captain in the Royal New Zealand Navy. He was the father of television presenter Sarah Bradley.

== Early life ==
Born in Hampstead, London, England in 1937, Bradley joined the Royal New Zealand Navy at age 15 and rose through the officer ranks during a 27-year naval career, marked by much success but which ultimately ended in controversy. To the Navy he was a charismatic leader, known for his intellect. He was unquestionably dedicated to the Navy, but he was impatient with red tape; Bradley always said he wanted 'a thinking Navy'.

== Naval career ==
=== Early career ===
Bradley joined the RNZN as a Cadet Midshipman in 1953. As was standard for New Zealand officer cadets at the time, his initial training took place ashore in Australia (HMAS Cerberus) before he was sent to the UK for sea training aboard the aircraft carrier HMS Triumph. He returned to New Zealand in 1957; his postings included a year aboard HMNZS Endeavour (the little, wooden-hulled, Antarctic support ship). Bradley applied his navigational skill to accurately chart several Antarctic islands.

Bradley was promoted to the rank of Lieutenant in 1959. As a recognition of his abilities he was posted to the UK to join the commissioning crew of HMNZS Otago, the first of New Zealand's modern, purpose-built frigates. He specialised in underwater warfare and diving, and returned to the UK for advanced training, where he topped his courses and was awarded the Ogilvy Medal by the Admiralty. These courses were followed by two years loan service with the Royal Navy, including a year at sea in one of the (then) latest anti-submarine frigates HMS Lowestoft.

Back in New Zealand he was proud to be appointed to the HMY Britannia during the 1966 Royal Tour of New Zealand. During the late 1960s he served as director of plans for the RNZN and played a major role in developing the modifications the RNZN made to the design of the 4th frigate HMNZS Canterbury, a broad beam Leander which was built for the RNZN with an enlarged flight deck to allow helicopters larger than the Wasp, with the flight deck activity monitored from the Operations Room by cameras on the hangar roof and the associated replacement of the suppressed limbo well with std USN Mk 34 triple torpedo launchers for close-in anti-submarine defence with shallow water Mk 44 torpedoes and deep water Mk 46 torpedoes. These modifications were later extended to most RN Leander modernisations. Many other modifications to the Leander design, planned by Bradley, such as the fitting of American sonars and the provision of the 8 km AS-12 missile for the Wasp to engage fast attack craft and surfaced submarines were rejected on political and cost grounds.

=== Later career ===
After continued sea service Bradley was given the important post of Executive Officer (second in command) for the new frigate Canterbury, then building in the UK. He was XO of HMNZS Canterbury from 1971 to 1973, where his reputation as a sailors' leader was cemented. One Rating recalled "He was an inspirational officer who at times ate in the junior rates mess, allowed more casual clothes for sailors proceeding ashore in civvies, and introduced the beer bar and bbq on the flight deck for all officers and ratings."

Promoted to the rank of Commander in 1973 Bradley completed periods of shore duty, including the Joint Services Staff Course in Australia. He also took a B.Com and Master of Public Policy. His private life was also marked by various affairs, including with now-deceased Dominion journalist Helen Paske. He was appointed to the command of HMNZS Waikato in 1977, and as Captain, Eleventh Frigate Squadron. The title 'Captain F11' was passed to the senior CO of our four frigates. His command of Waikato included the dramatic rescue of an ill Russian Seaman from a Soviet trawler south of Stewart Island (the helicopter crew were awarded bravery medals).

In his book Don't Rock the Boat, Bradley gives a detailed account of Waikato's diplomatic and representational role during what were high-profile port visits.

In 1979, Bradley was appointed as Chief of Staff to the Commodore Auckland in the rank of Temporary Captain, with the responsibility of reorganising the Command Support Organisation. He initiated several innovative ideas, and he was appointed to command the new organisation on its inception in 1980.

Bradley left Auckland one weekend for social reasons and was subsequently accused of abandonment of his command and deserting his post. The Chief of Naval Staff of the time saw that as deserving punishment. Bradley was demoted to his substantive rank of commander and allocated an office without a function and, proud and determined to the end, recognised he had effectively been relieved from the Navy and resigned from the RNZN.

=== Listener article ===
In the following two years he dabbled in TV film production and commentated on defence for the media and TV, notably clashing with the Minister of Defence over a poorly edited 1982 Listener article in which Bradley claimed that the Navy was going nowhere, that frigates like the RNZN Type 12's and Leanders, could not be economically modernised and that the performance of RNZN type frigates in the Falklands war had been disastrous and that they contributed nothing, and privately went further in his own defence, stating that frigates like HMS Plymouth, far from performing well, were so useless that the Argentine Navy and Air Force would never have wasted a bomb attacking HMS Plymouth or Yarmouth, unless no other target was available and that the British Type 12s Plymouth and Yarmouth were effectively Leander-class frigates of the same standard as HMNZS Canterbury and HMS Bachantee, which the RNZN was receiving second hand, after their late 1960s reconstruction and were not of the same class as HMNZ Otago at all.

It has since emerged that the Argentine pilots never attacked the elderly RN T12s in Falkland Sound and that the Task Force Commanders Admiral Sandy Woodward and Captain John Coward regarded the Plymouth and Yarmouth as heroic, but useless and worse and constantly anticipated their reduction to burning rubble. The main interest of Ian Bradley at the time was opposing the government's plan to convert to RNZN to submarines which he considered a fantasy. Bradley, who loved cars, in 1983 bought a garage in Devonport, taking a particular delight in serving many of the sailors who continued to support him.

Bradley was determined to regain his honour as a commissioned officer. He brought a lawsuit against the Navy, which he lost, an outcome which he believed to be a miscarriage of justice. His position was that he would have eventually become Chief of the Defence Force, and certain powers found that prospect unacceptable, hence his dismissal. He continued to pursue the Navy and ultimately won an acknowledgement from the Governor-General that he had been unjustly treated. It was too late to reinstate his career.

== Politics ==
Bradley went into local politics after his naval career, initially with the Devonport Borough Council (1983–86) and Auckland Regional Authority (1986–88) before serving in the Auckland Regional Council. Later, Bradley joined the Department of Conservation where his work in the Auckland Conservancy proved to be dedicated, innovative and valuable.

== Later life and death ==
Bradley married and had two daughters but the marriage ended in divorce. In Vancouver he developed a relationship with a young Canadian Forces bandswoman. Although the age difference ultimately ended their romance, Bradley wrote later that if he had married her maybe the events that ended his career would not have occurred.

After leaving the navy, Bradley also competed in Ironman events.

He died suddenly in Charleston, South Carolina, USA, on 20 June 2015.
