= LÉ Gobnait =

2008 Lake-class patrol vessel

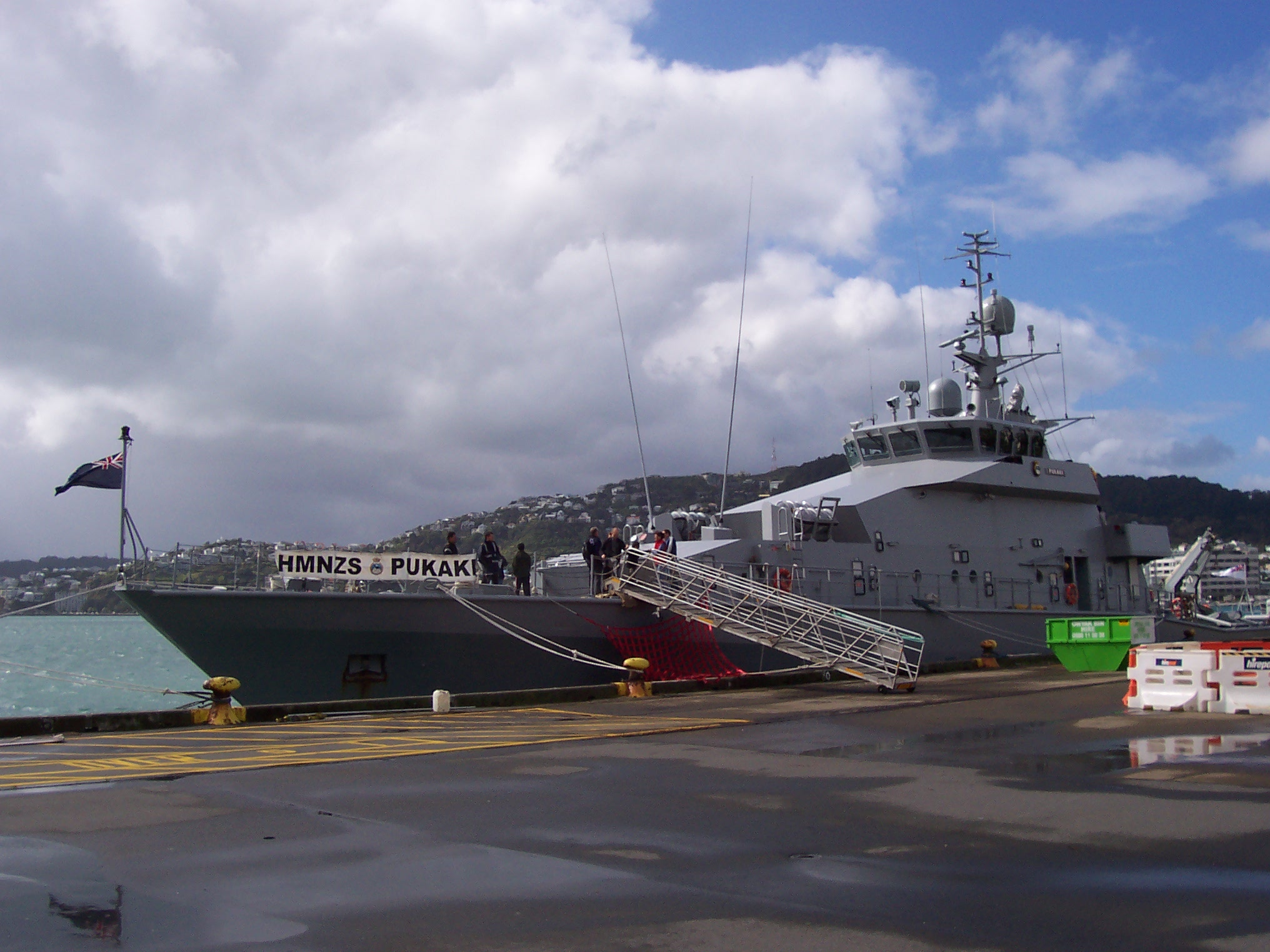
- HMNZS Pukaki at Queens Wharf, Wellington

History

New Zealand
- Name: HMNZS Pukaki
- Namesake: Lake Pukaki
- Builder: Tenix Defence, Whangārei
- Launched: 6 May 2008
- Christened: 10 May 2008
- Commissioned: 2009
- Decommissioned: 17 October 2019
- Identification: IMO number: 9368510; MMSI number: 512157000; Callsign: ZMZL; Pennant number: P3568
- Fate: Sold to the Irish Naval Service

Ireland
- Name: LÉ Gobnait
- Namesake: Gobnait
- Cost: €13 million (2022) (equivalent to €14.04 million in 2025)
- Acquired: 13 March 2022
- Commissioned: September 2024
- Identification: IMO number: 9368510; MMSI number: 512157000; Callsign: EIA2733; Pennant number: P72

General characteristics
- Class & type: Lake-class inshore patrol vessel
- Displacement: 340 t (335 long tons) loaded
- Length: 55 m (180 ft 5 in)
- Beam: 9 m (29 ft 6 in)
- Draught: 2.9 m (9 ft 6 in)
- Propulsion: 2 × MAN B&W 12VP185 engines rated at 2,500 kW at 1,907 rpm; ZF 7640 NR gearboxes; 2 controllable pitch propellers
- Speed: Baseline speed 25 knots (46 km/h); Economical speed 12 knots (22 km/h); Loiter speed 4–7 knots
- Range: 3,000 nmi (5,600 km)

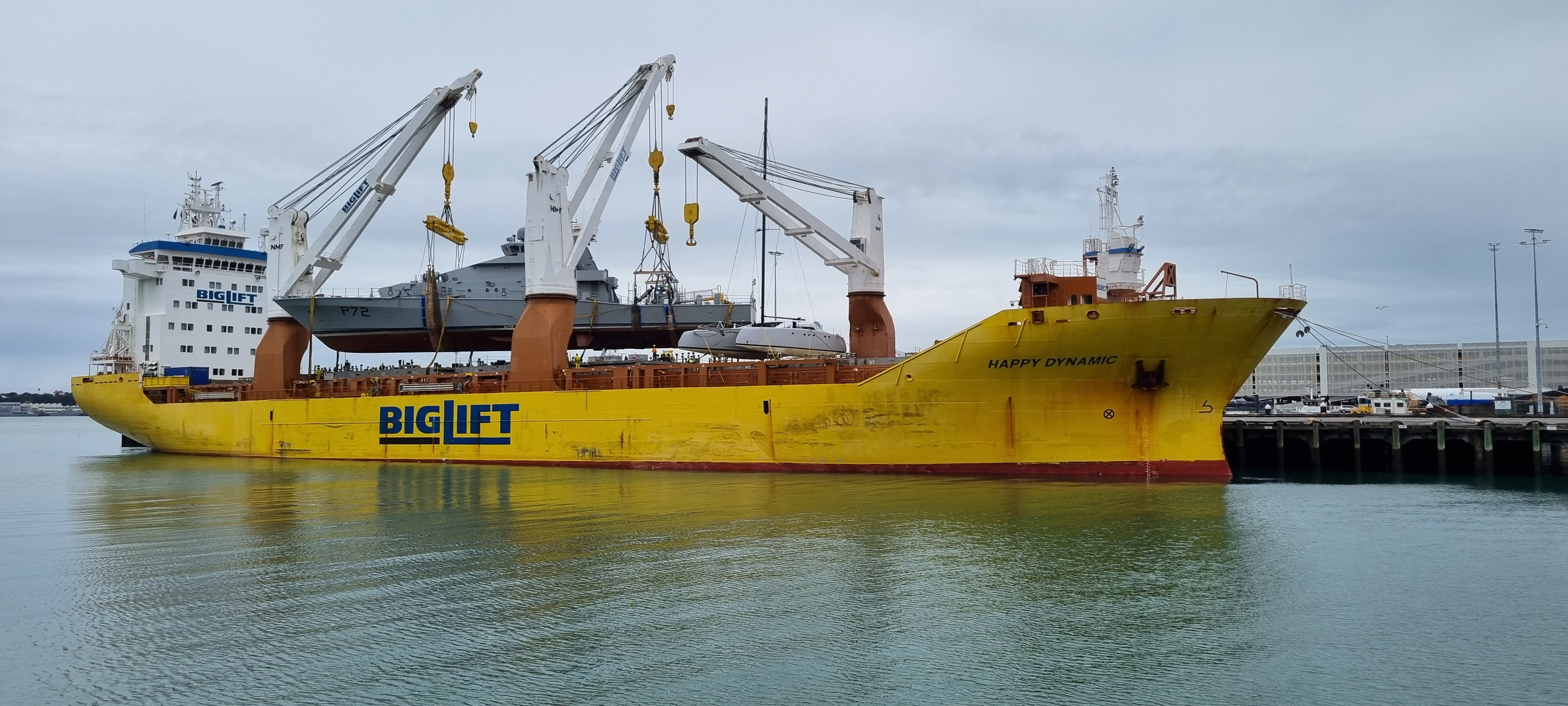
LÉ Gobnait being loaded onto a heavy-lift ship in Auckland, en-route to Ireland. Since it can only handle sea state 4, it could not make the journey on its own.

LÉ Gobnait (Irish pronunciation: [ˈɡɔbˠnˠətʲ], GUB-nət) is a Lake-class inshore patrol vessel inshore patrol boat of the Irish Naval Service. Launched as HMNZS Pukaki in 2008, the vessel was in Royal New Zealand Navy service from 2009 to 2019. Its primary duties included border and fisheries protection patrols, surveillance, boarding operations and search and rescue response. It was sold to Ireland in 2022. Together with its sister Rotoiti, Pukaki was renamed and commissioned into Irish service in September 2024.

== New Zealand service ==
Commissioned in 2009, Pukaki was the third ship of this name to serve in the Royal New Zealand Navy and is named after Lake Pukaki.

Pukaki, which did not sail to sea between 2012 and 2016, was decommissioned at Devonport Naval Base on 17 October 2019. Regulatory changes in 2012 resulted in operating restrictions around speed and sea states being imposed on them. Subsequently the RNZN assessed them as no longer being suited to the heavy seas typically encountered off New Zealand and further afield.

In 2022, Pukaki, along with her sister Rotoiti, was sold to Ireland for use by the Irish Naval Service. Both ships were purchased by Irish Department of Defence for €26m.

== Irish service ==
Pukaki and Rotoiti were transported, from New Zealand to Ireland, by the heavy lift transport ship Happy Dynamic. Arriving in Ireland in May 2023, they were delivered to the Irish naval base at Haulbowline in Cork Harbour where they underwent a refit.

Pukaki was renamed and commissioned into Irish service, as LÉ Gobnait (after the Irish saint, Gobnait), in September 2024. The vessel is primarily intended for fisheries protection patrols in the Irish Sea.

By mid-2025, LÉ Gobnait had spent its first 15 months in Irish service without a deployment, raising questions about the Naval Service's operational capabilities.

== See also ==
- Patrol boats of the Royal New Zealand Navy
