= HMNZS Taupo (2008) =

Protector-class inshore patrol boat of the Royal New Zealand Navy

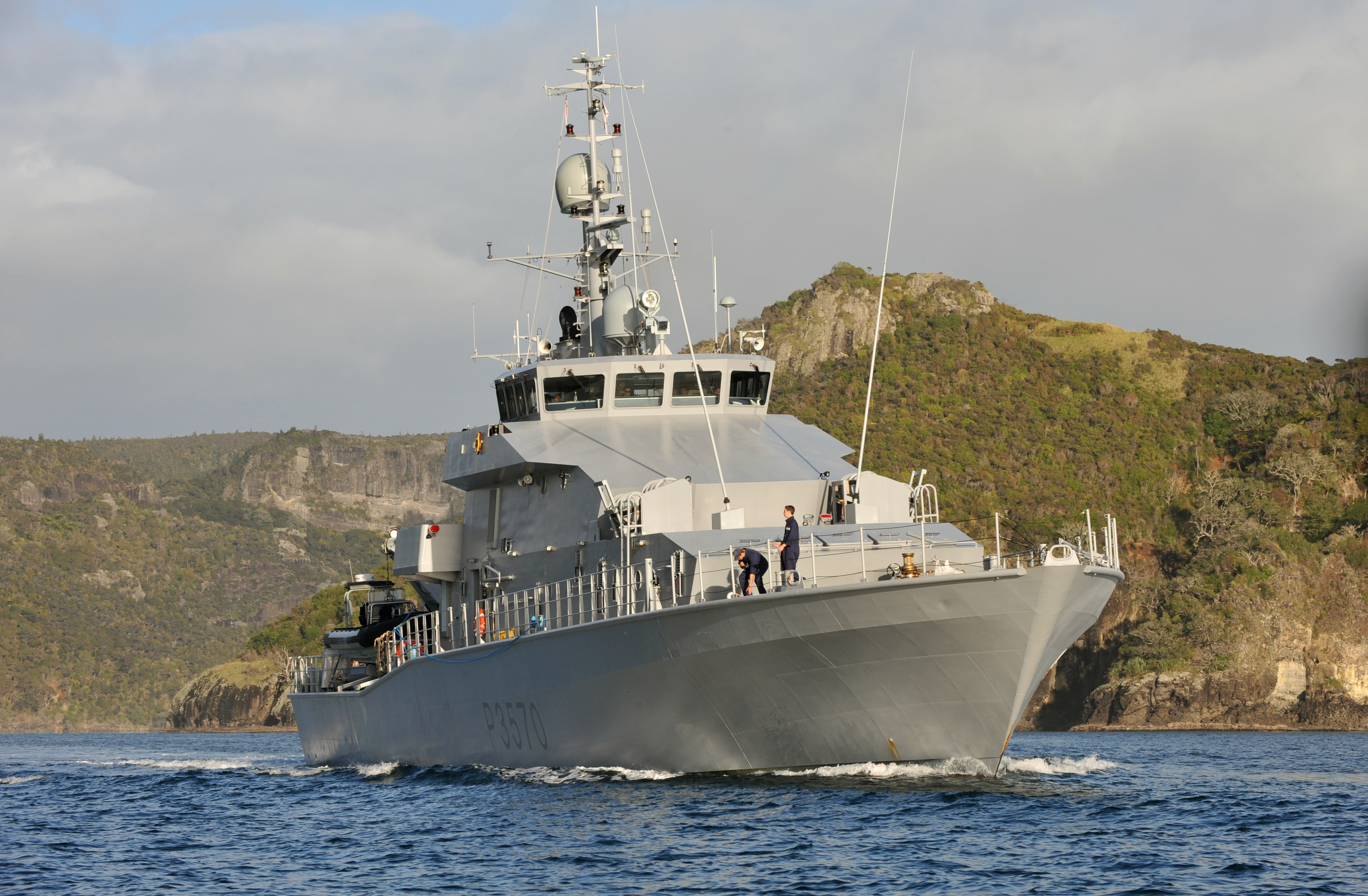

History

New Zealand
- Name: HMNZS Taupo
- Namesake: Lake Taupō
- Builder: Tenix Defence
- Launched: 23 August 2008
- Christened: 23 August 2008
- Commissioned: 29 May 2009
- Home port: Devonport Naval Base
- Identification: IMO number: 9368522; MMSI number: 512158000; Callsign: ZMZN; Pennant number: P3570
- Status: in active service as of 2026

General characteristics
- Class & type: Lake-class inshore patrol vessel
- Displacement: 340 t (335 long tons) loaded
- Length: 55 m (180 ft 5 in)
- Beam: 9 m (29 ft 6 in)
- Draught: 2.9 m (9 ft 6 in)
- Propulsion: 2 × MAN B&W 12VP185 engines rated at 2,500 kW at 1,907 rpm; ZF 7640 NR gearboxes; 2 controllable pitch propellers
- Speed: Baseline speed 25 knots (46 km/h); Economical speed 12 knots (22 km/h); Loiter speed 4-7 knots
- Range: 3,000 nmi (5,600 km)
- Complement: 20 (+2) Navy, 4 Govt. agency officers, 12 additional personnel
- Armament: 3 × 12.7 mm machine guns, mounted forward and two either side of the funnel; Small arms

HMNZS Taupo is a Lake-class inshore patrol vessel of the Royal New Zealand Navy. Taupo was delivered to the Ministry of Defence on 28 May 2009 and commissioned into the Royal New Zealand Navy on 29 May 2009. Taupo is the third ship of this name to serve in the Royal New Zealand Navy and is named after Lake Taupō.

Taupo did not sail to sea between 2013-2016 (at least 2016, maybe even further).

Two of the four Lake-class vessels were sold to the Irish Naval Service in 2023 and were commissioned into Irish service 4 September 2024. Taupo was not one of them and as of 2026 it remains in Royal New Zealand Navy service, performing border and fisheries protection patrols.

== See also ==
- Patrol boats of the Royal New Zealand Navy
