= HMNZS Canterbury =

Two ships of the Royal New Zealand Navy have been named HMNZS Canterbury after the Canterbury region of New Zealand:

- HMNZS Canterbury (F421), was a Leander-class frigate that served from 1971 to 2005, and was sunk as a dive wreck in 2007.
- HMNZS Canterbury (L421), a sealift ship commissioned in 2007.
