= LÉ Aoibhinn =

2007 Lake-class patrol vessel

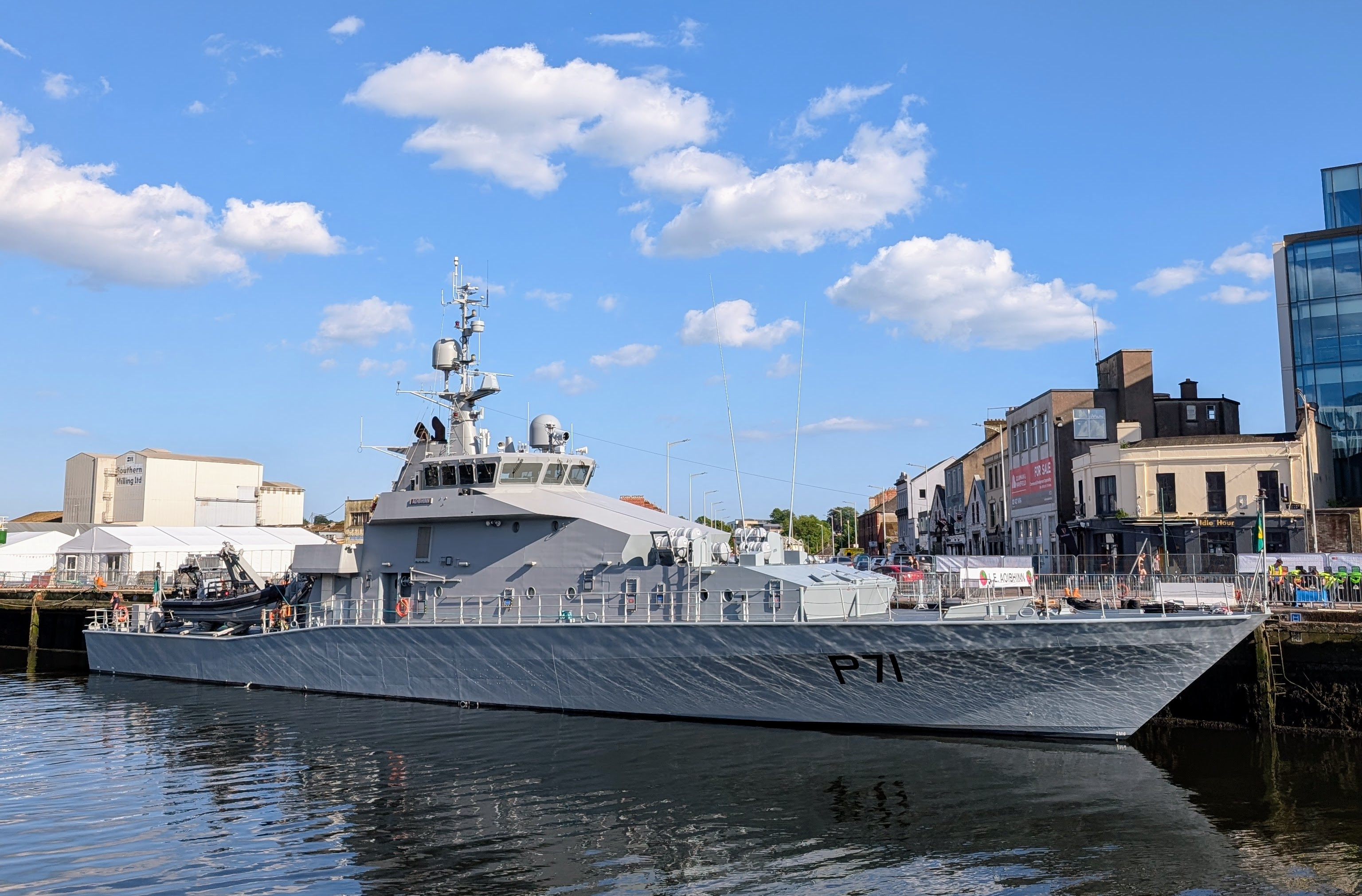
- LÉ Aoibhinn (P71) docked in Cork

History

New Zealand
- Name: HMNZS Rotoiti
- Namesake: Lake Rotoiti
- Builder: Tenix Defence, Whangārei
- Commissioned: 17 April 2009
- Stricken: 17 October 2019
- Identification: IMO number: 9368493; MMSI number: 512154000; Callsign: ZMZM; Pennant number: P3569

Ireland
- Name: LÉ Aoibhinn
- Namesake: Irish girl's name meaning "delightful"
- Cost: €13 million (2022) (equivalent to €14.04 million in 2025)
- Acquired: 13 March 2022
- Identification: IMO number: 9368493; MMSI number: 250014267; Callsign: EIA2723; Pennant number: P71

General characteristics
- Class & type: Lake-class inshore patrol vessel
- Displacement: 340 t (335 long tons) loaded
- Length: 55 m (180 ft 5 in)
- Beam: 9 m (29 ft 6 in)
- Draught: 2.9 m (9 ft 6 in)
- Propulsion: 2 × MAN B&W 12VP185 engines rated at 2,500 kW at 1,907 rpm; ZF 7640 NR gearboxes; 2 controllable pitch propellers
- Speed: Baseline speed 25 knots (46 km/h); Economical speed 12 knots (22 km/h); Loiter speed 4-7 knots
- Range: 3,000 nmi (5,600 km)
- Boats & landing craft carried: 2 rigid inflatable boats

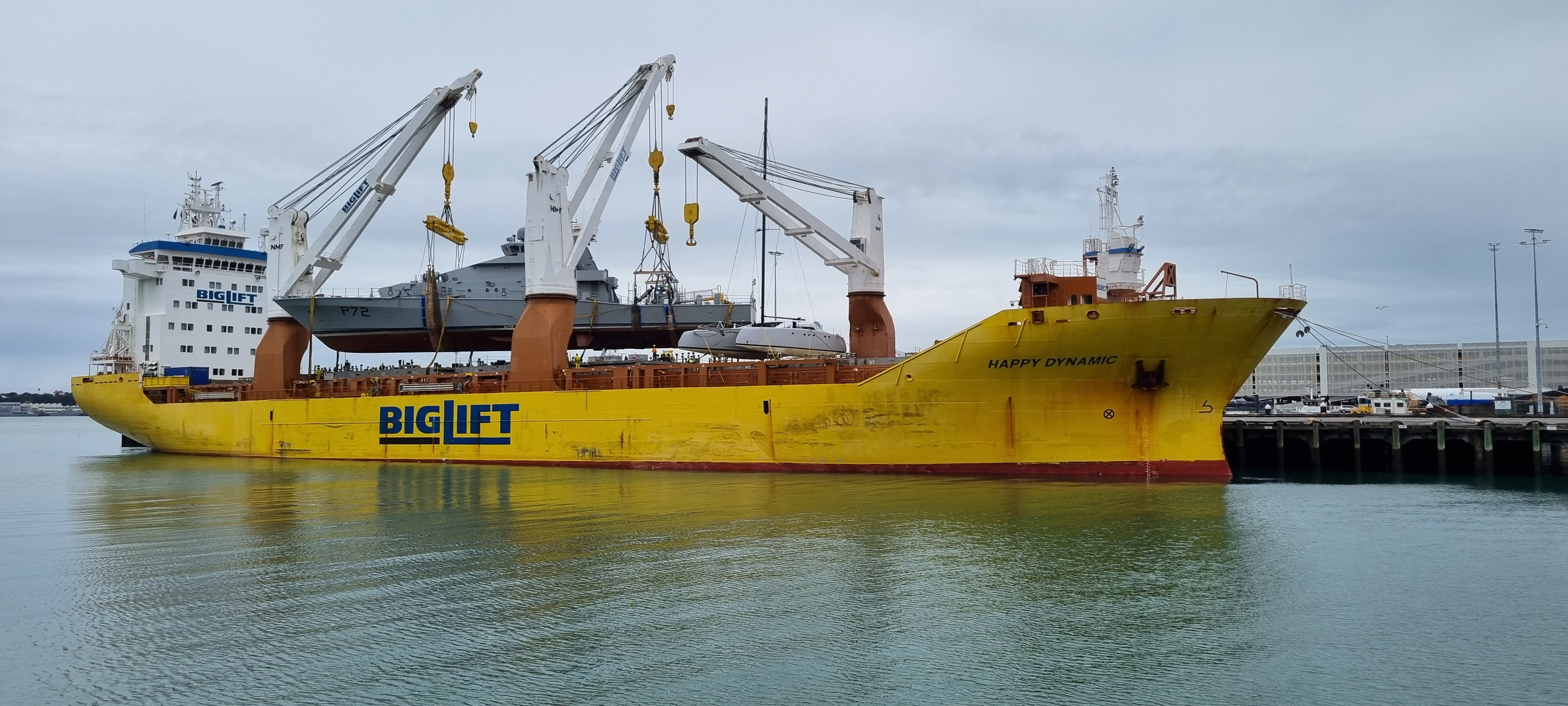
LÉ Aoibhinn and LÉ Gobnait were transported from Auckland to Ireland via a heavy-lift ship, since they are too small to make the journey on their own

LÉ Aoibhinn (EE-vin, Irish: [ˈiːvʲən̠ʲ]) is a Lake-class inshore patrol vessel of the Irish Naval Service. Under the name HMNZS Rotoiti it was used for border and fishery protection patrols by the Royal New Zealand Navy from 2009 to 2019. Together with its sister Pukaki, the vessel was sold to Ireland for use by the Irish Naval Service in 2022. Rotoiti was renamed and commissioned into Irish service in September 2024.

== New Zealand service ==
The vessel was fitted out in Whangārei and on 20 November 2007 started contractor sea trials. After delays due to problems with gear and fittings, she was commissioned on 17 April 2009, and arrived at the Devonport Naval Base for the first time on 24 April 2009. HMNZS Rotoiti was the first of her class to be commissioned in the Royal New Zealand Navy. Rotoiti was the third boat of this name to serve in the Royal New Zealand Navy and named after Lake Rotoiti.

Rotoiti was decommissioned at Devonport Naval Base on 17 October 2019. Regulatory changes in 2012 resulted in operating restrictions around speed and sea states being imposed on them. Subsequently, the RNZN assessed them as no longer being suited to the heavy seas typically encountered off New Zealand and further afield, for which Protector-class offshore patrol vessels were more suited.

== Irish service ==
In 2022, Rotoiti, along with her sister Pukaki, was sold to Ireland for use by the Irish Naval Service. The two vessels arrived in Ireland in May 2023. Rotoiti was commissioned into Irish service, as LÉ Aoibhinn, in September 2024.

During Storm Chandra, in late January 2026, LÉ Aoibhinn suffered hull damage while moored at Carlisle Pier in Dún Laoghaire. The damage reportedly had "no effect on serviceability" and the vessel "continued on her sailing orders".

== See also ==
- Patrol boats of the Royal New Zealand Navy
