= Sarah Bradley =

New Zealand broadcaster

- Born: 20 April 1966 (age 60); Auckland, New Zealand
- Education: University of Waikato
- Occupations: Actress (former), newsreader/journalist

Sarah Bradley (born 20 April 1966 in Auckland) is a TV presenter and the daughter of the controversial former naval officer Captain Ian Bradley.

After attending High school at Waitakere College in Henderson Auckland, then studying finance and marketing at Waikato University and graduating with honours, Bradley began working for IBM as a marketing associate. In 1991, she left for New York City to pursue a stage career, attending the American Musical and Dramatic Academy, majoring in musical theatre, after which she toured in several productions. She began hosting local television shows in New York state.

She became a television reporter for WRNN, before joining WTNH in New Haven, Connecticut and then CNNfn. She worked part-time at Lehman Brothers.

In 2001, she returned to Auckland as business editor for TV3 News and was a back-up anchor for the network's flagship 3 News at 6 p.m., and its late-night news programme, Nightline. She began her stint on Good Morning in late February 2006. In late 2011 it was announced Bradley would be leaving Good Morning at the end of 2011. Since 2019, she has been a fill-in newsreader on RNZ National.

Sarah has one daughter, Melinda, with Peter Stokes, an investment adviser with JBWere.

== See also ==
- List of New Zealand television personalities
