= Sealift =

Use of cargo ships for the deployment of civilian and military assets and supplies

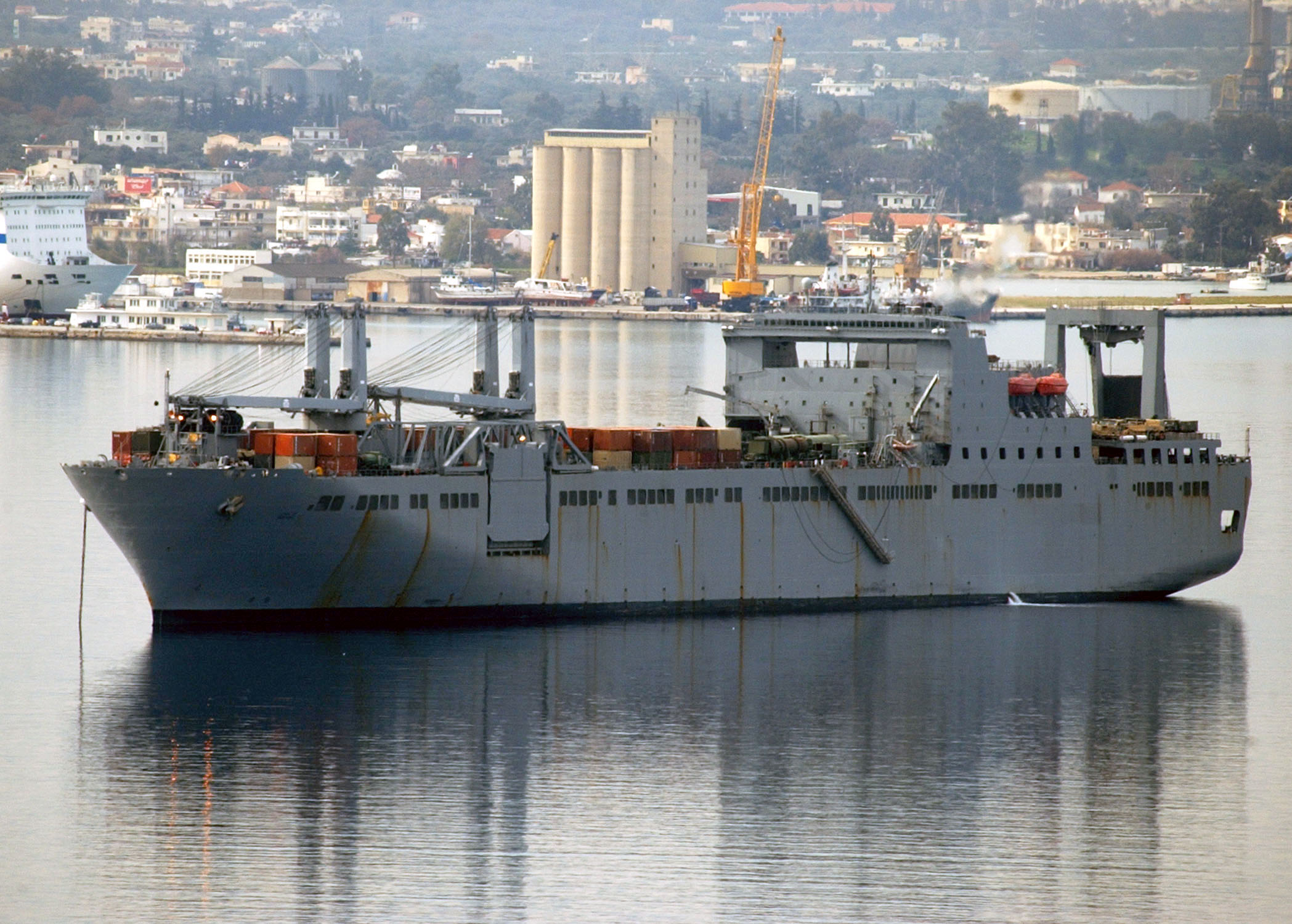
The USNS Bob Hope, a non-combatant vessel crewed by civilian mariners under the United States Navy's Military Sealift Command, is used to preposition tanks, trucks and other supplies needed to support an Army heavy brigade.

Sealift is a term used predominantly in military logistics and refers to the use of cargo ships for the deployment of military assets, such as weaponry, vehicles, military personnel, and supplies. It complements other means of transport, such as strategic airlifts, in order to enhance a state's ability to project power.

Sealift shipping falls into three broad categories: dry cargo freighters, liquid tankers, and passenger or troop ships. During joint operations, dry cargo ships may transport equipment and supplies required to conduct and sustain the operation; tankers carry fuel; while passenger and troop ships carry personnel to the theater and allow the evacuation of noncombatants or those in need of medical aid.

Sealift can also be divided into strategic and tactical sealift. Strategic sealift is the transportation of vehicles and equipment to a staging area equipped with port facilities, with personnel arriving by other methods. Tactical sealift occurs when a ship is carrying personnel along with vehicles and equipment, and is able to deploy them directly and operationally, like in an amphibious assault.

While ships are slower than their airborne counterparts and may require port facilities to unload their cargo, their larger capacity allows them to transport heavy armoured forces or bulky supplies that only the largest strategic airlifters (such as the C-5 Galaxy) could normally handle, and in much greater quantities.

A state's sealift capabilities may include civilian-operated ships that normally operate by contract, but which can be chartered or commandeered during times of military necessity to supplement government-owned naval fleets. Some smaller navies have built multi-role vessels that combine sealift with other capabilities, such as those of a patrol frigate or a command-and-control vessel, the Royal Danish Navy's Absalon-class and the Royal New Zealand Navy's multi-role vessel HMNZS Canterbury being examples.

== Civilian use ==
Sealift refers to the re-supply of isolated communities with fuel, building materials, foodstuffs, vehicles and other goods. This is the most common method used for the coastal communities of northern Canada due to the lower cost and the larger capacity of ships and barges over aircraft. An annual occurrence in the Arctic, the sealift is usually performed between July and October, when the sea is ice free.

Typically two types of ships are used, the older, less-seen cargo ship and the more usual tugboat. While both types also haul barges, the cargo ship also carries cargo on deck. Most Arctic communities do not have a port and cranes to unload the supplies but may have a simple dock. Where the community does not have a dock, the ship either must ground itself or the barges. Supplies are then removed by forklift truck which is also carried on board. The interior of the barges are used to carry fuel and other supplies are carried in containers on deck.

== See also ==
- Power projection
- United States Navy Military Sealift Command
- Royal Navy's Royal Fleet Auxiliary
- Littoral warfare
- Loss of Strength Gradient
- Seabasing
- Over-the-beach capability
- U.S. Merchant Marine Academy
