= HMNZS Canterbury (L421) =

Royal New Zealand Navy ship from 2006

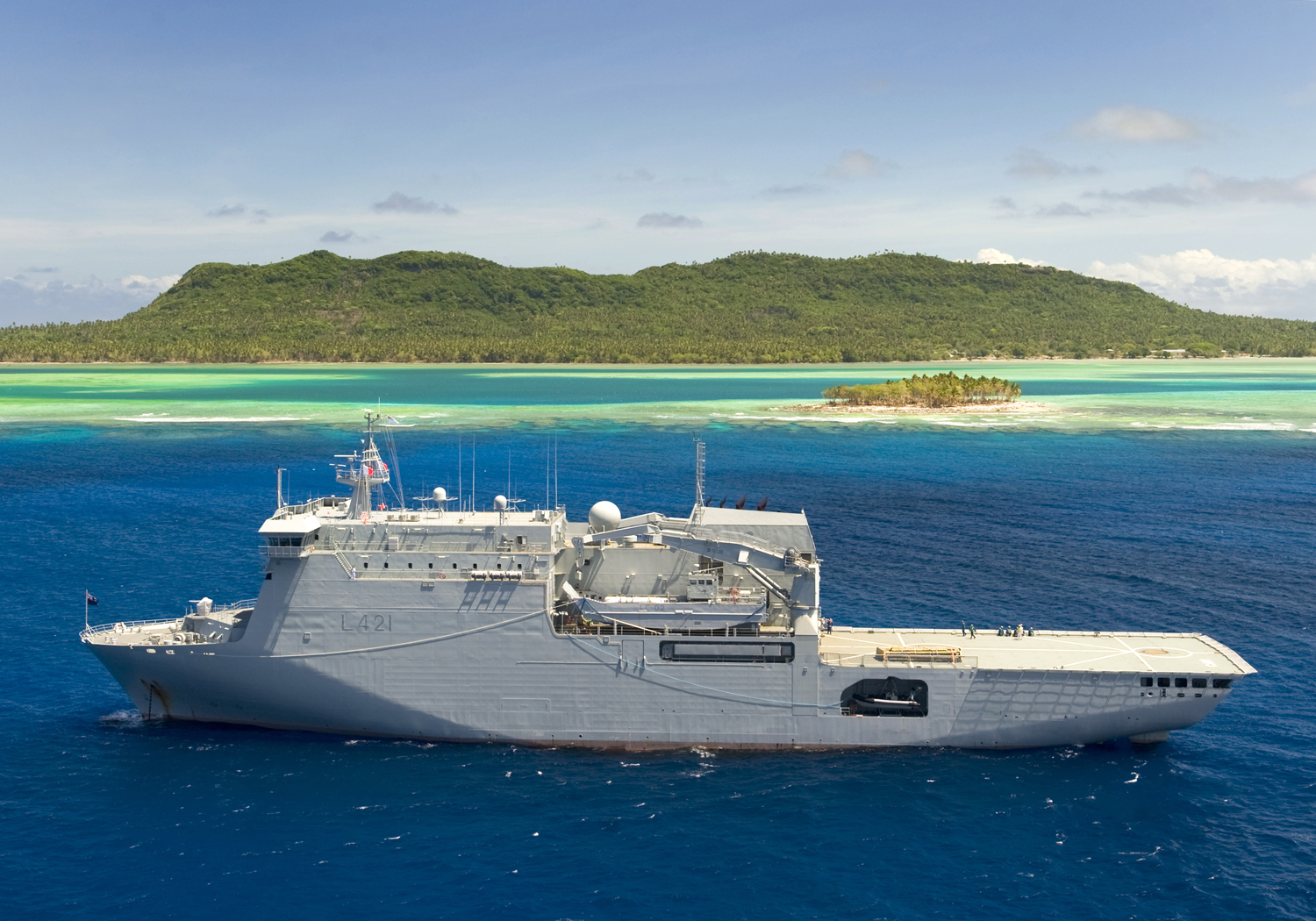
- HMNZS Canterbury off Samoa in 2009

History

New Zealand
- Name: HMNZS Canterbury (L421)
- Namesake: HMNZS Canterbury (F421)
- Builder: Merwede Shipyards, Netherlands; fitted out by Tenix Pty Ltd
- Cost: NZ$130 million
- Yard number: 705
- Laid down: 6 September 2005
- Launched: 11 February 2006
- Sponsored by: Helen Clark
- Completed: 31 May 2007
- Commissioned: 12 June 2007 (19 years ago)
- Home port: Ceremonially: Lyttelton; Operationally: Devonport
- Identification: Call sign: ZMCR; Deck code: CAN; Pennant number: L421; IMO number: 9338644; MMSI number: 512153000
- Status: Active

General characteristics
- Type: Multi-role vessel
- Displacement: 9,000 tonnes (full load)
- Length: 131 m (430 ft)
- Beam: 23.4 m (77 ft)
- Draught: 5.4 m (18 ft)
- Propulsion: CODADE (combined diesel and diesel-electric) consisting of 2 × 4.5 MW Wärtsilä engines, 3 × auxiliary diesels, 2 × bow thrusters
- Speed: 19.6 kn (36.3 km/h; 22.6 mph) baseline; 16 kn (30 km/h; 18 mph) economical
- Range: 8,000 nmi (15,000 km; 9,200 mi) at 16 kn (30 km/h; 18 mph)
- Boats & landing craft carried: 2 × medium landing craft (23 m) displacement: 55 tonnes (empty), 100 tonnes (full load), crew: 3; 2 × RHIB (7.4 m), 300 hp (220 kW), range: 130 nmi (240 km) speed: 35 kn (65 km/h); 2 × special forces RHIB (11 m) as optional cargo
- Troops: Up to 243
- Complement: Core: 78 naval, 10 air force, 7 army; Other: 24 trainees, 4 government agents
- Sensors & processing systems: Fire control: Vistar Electro-Optical; ESM: CEA Warrlock HFDF; Radar: S & X band
- Armament: 1 × remote-controlled MSI DS25 stabilised naval gun with 25 mm M242 Bushmaster cannon; 2 × .50 calibre machine guns; Small arms
- Aircraft carried: 2 × SH-2G Seasprite helicopter. Can be armed with a combination of homing torpedoes, depth charges, Penguin air-to-surface missiles and a MAG58M machine gun.; 4 × NH90 helicopters.
- Aviation facilities: Helicopter deck (stern)

HMNZS Canterbury is a multi-role vessel (MRV) of the Royal New Zealand Navy. She was commissioned in June 2007, and is the second ship of the Royal New Zealand Navy to carry the name. She is also New Zealand's first purpose-built strategic sealift ship.

== Planning and design ==
As early as 1988 the Royal New Zealand Navy had identified the need for some form of sealift in the South Pacific. In 1995, this led to the commissioning of HMNZS Charles Upham. The subsequent failure of successive governments to fund the required refits resulted in Charles Upham being sold in 2001.

At the same time the newly elected Labour Government directed the navy to exclude the option of a third frigate from the Maritime Forces Review, while the sea lift requirement was also part of a wider capability mix desired.

== Construction ==
The construction of the MRV was sub-contracted to Merwede Shipyards in the Netherlands by Tenix Shipyards in Williamstown, Melbourne, with the design based on the commercial RoRo ship Ben my Chree. However, the choice of a commercially based design has been criticised after the ship was delivered, as it placed several limitations on the functionality of the ship in rough seas – rather than the coastal environment for which Ben my Chree was designed.

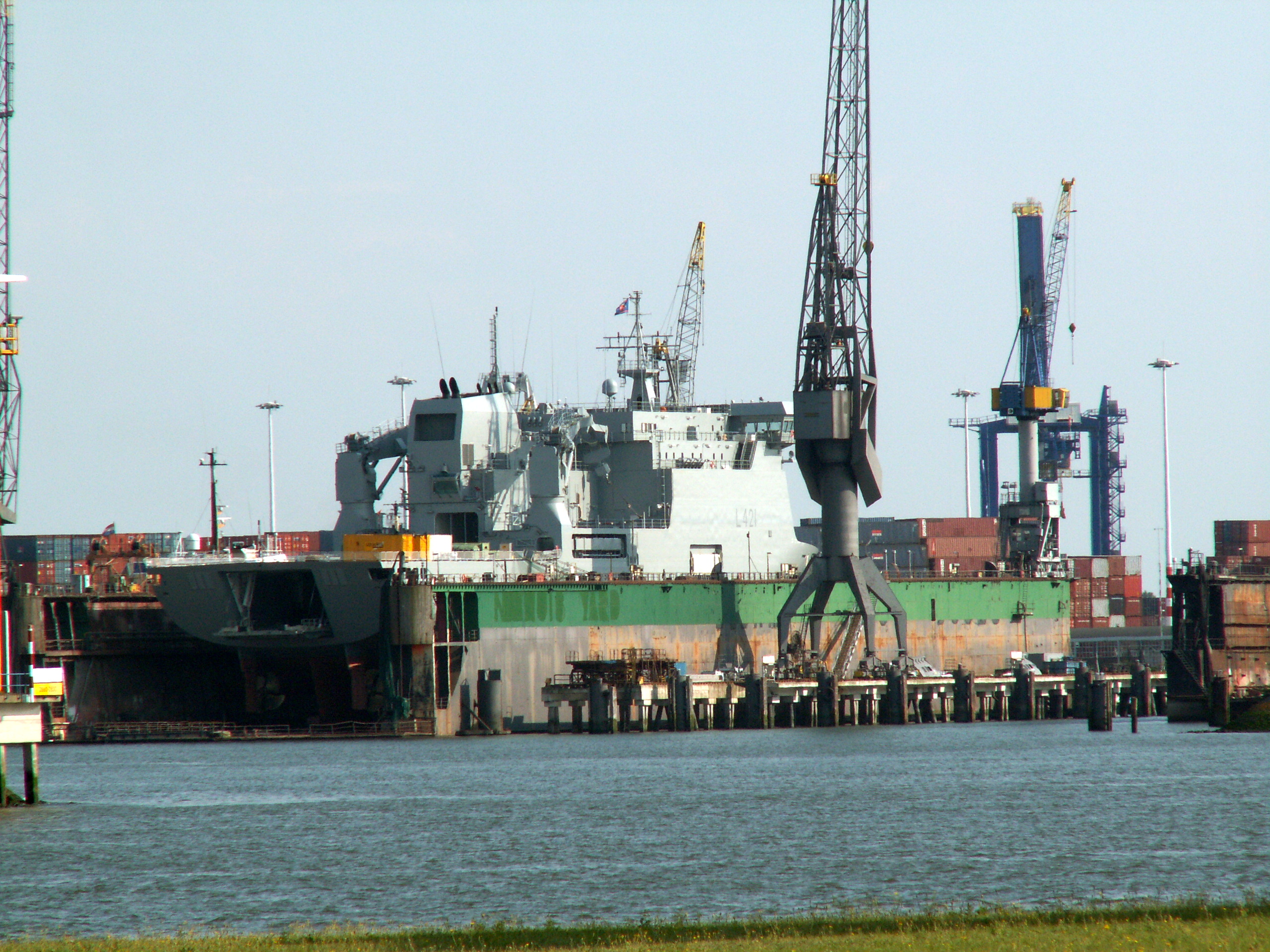
Canterbury under construction in Rotterdam

The keel was laid on 6 September 2005 and the MRV was launched successfully on 11 February 2006. The ship completed initial sea trials in the Netherlands and arrived in Australia in late August 2006 for fit-out with military equipment. Final acceptance was delayed due to alterations to the ship's hospital and late delivery of documentation. There were also ongoing concerns, negotiations and redesign activities regarding her performance in heavy seas, doubts about which had already been thrown up during her initial journey to Australia, and in fact, even before actual construction.

The MRV was accepted by the New Zealand Government on 31 May 2007 and commissioned on 12 June 2007 in Port Melbourne, Australia by the Prime Minister of New Zealand, Helen Clark. The ship cost NZ$130 million to construct.

She was constructed with an ice-strengthened hull to allow her to operate in the subantarctic waters, where New Zealand governs several islands, and where Canterbury is to assist scientific expeditions.

The vessel was plagued by problems since delivery, having been involved in a number of incidents and being considered less seaworthy than specified. It was estimated in 2008 that at least another NZ$20 million would have to be spent to achieve the sought-for operational abilities.

== Operational history ==
=== Initial exercises and operations ===
After commissioning, the ship sailed to its home port of Lyttelton arriving 28 June 2007. After several days of inaugural events, it departed again on 2 July. Following a courtesy visit to Timaru and after a month-long set of trials and exercises in the Auckland area, where she is operationally based at Devonport Naval Base, she is to head to New Zealand's subantarctic waters carrying DOC conservation officers.

In September 2007, Canterbury embarked 250 troops and 50 vehicles, including 20 NZLAV armoured vehicles, to test embarkation and disembarkation procedures.

=== AU-NZ disaster relief response force ===
In early 2011, it was announced that the ship would form the core asset of a joint Australia-New Zealand task force for disaster-relief operations. At that time Canterbury was the only vessel available to the navies of the two countries suitable for such tasks as three other similarly capable Australian ships were unavailable due to significant maintenance problems.

Coincidentally, the newly appointed disaster-relief ship was in the port of Lyttelton less than two weeks later during the devastating February 2011 Christchurch earthquake. The crew provided meals for 1,000 people left homeless in that town, and accommodation for a small number of locals.

=== 2012 Kermadec Islands eruption and pumice raft ===
HMNZS Canterbury was the first ship to take scientific samples from a 7,500–10,000 square mile pumice raft that was discovered in the Kermadec Islands.

=== 2016 Tropical Cyclone Winston ===
Canterbury served as the primary logistical base for the NZDF Humanitarian Aid and Disaster Relief effort in Fiji following Tropical Cyclone Winston. Canterbury transported 106 tonnes of supplies, 300 army personnel, 45 military vehicles, 1 Navy Seasprite and 2 Air Force NH90 Helicopters to the islands. The ship served as a moveable airfield to conduct airlift operations and conducted amphibious landings of army vehicles to cyclone-stricken areas. Canterbury's efforts were later praised by the residents of Vanuabalavu for their work in the aftermath of the relief effort.

=== 2016 Kaikōura earthquake ===
After the earthquake on 14 November 2016, HMNZS Canterbury was deployed to provide relief for Kaikōura, as extensive damage to major roads severely restricted access. The ship delivered supplies from Port Lyttelton to Kaikōura and evacuated foreign tourists back to Port Lyttelton.

=== 2022 Hunga Tonga eruption and tsunami ===
On 20 January, New Zealand announced that it would dispatch HMNZS Canterbury with two NH90 helicopters to assist with relief efforts after the eruption in Tonga, following the earlier deployment of HMNZS Wellington and HMNZS Aotearoa on 18 January.

=== 2026 Tokelau visit ===
In mid-February 2026 HMNZS Canterbury carried Governor-General of New Zealand Cindy Kiro during her expedition to the Tokelau archipelago to meet with local leaders.

== Capabilities ==
=== Armaments ===
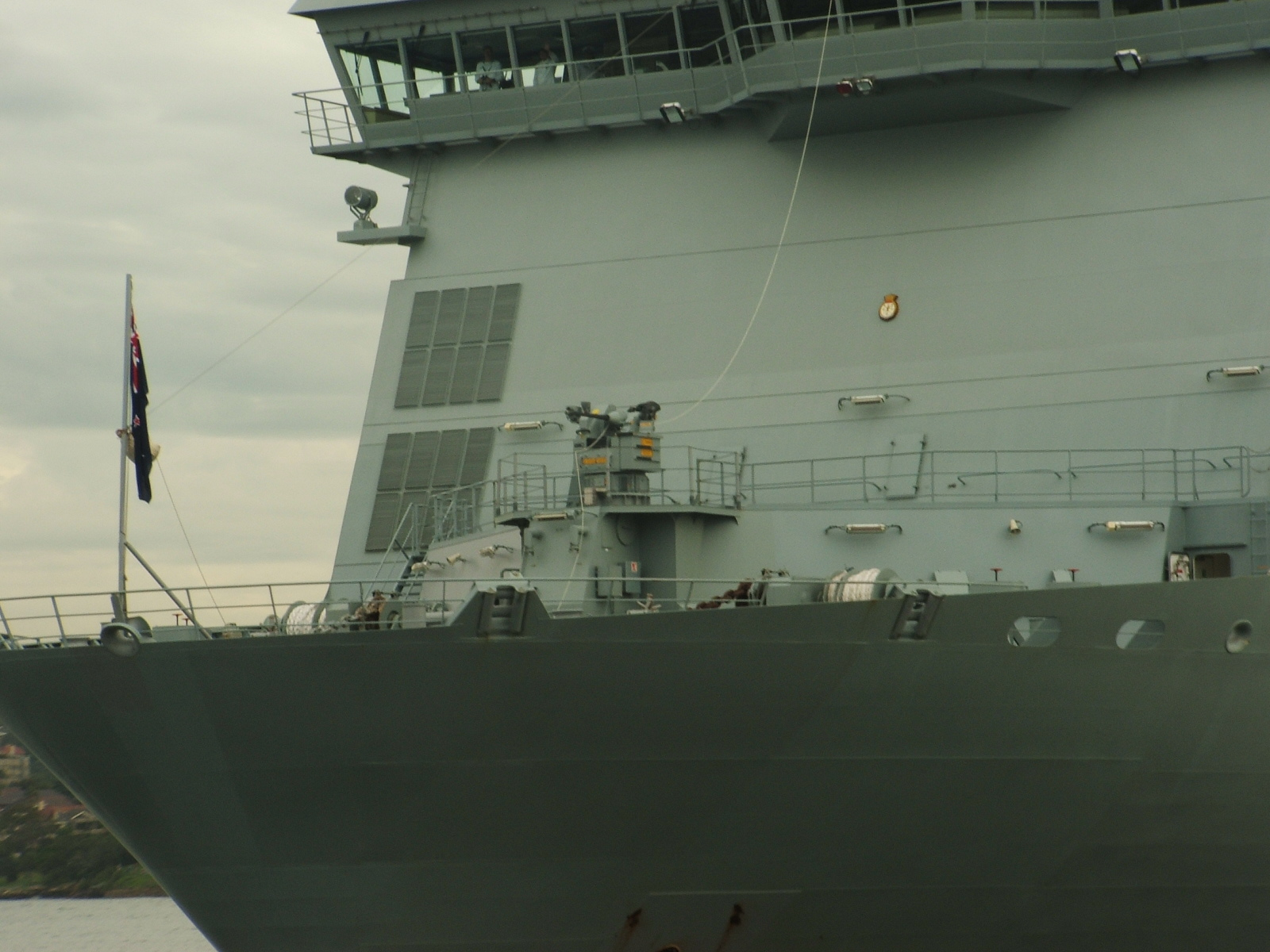
The M242 Bushmaster cannon fitted to Canterbury's foredeck is the primary weapon fitted to the sealift ship

As a sealift ship, Canterbury is not intended to enter combat, or conduct opposed landings under fire. The ship's armament consists of a single 25 mm M242 Bushmaster cannon fitted to an MSI DS25 stabilised mount, two .50 calibre machine guns, and a number of small arms. These are intended for self-defence against other smaller craft, and for ocean patrol duties (for example the intercepting of suspicious civilian craft) during a naval blockade.

=== Facilities ===
==== Cargo ====
The ship has cargo space of 1,451 square metres (15,620 sq ft), which can be unloaded via two ramps, either from the starboard side or the stern.

The indicative cargo would encompass (as one possible loadout): 14 Pinzgauer Light Operational Vehicles, 16 NZLAV light armoured vehicles, 7 Unimog trucks, 2 ambulances, 2 flatbed trucks, 7 vehicle trailers, 2 rough terrain forklifts, 4 ATV-type vehicles and up to 33 20 ft TEU containers.

The ship is equipped to embark up to eight containers of ammunition and up to two with hazardous materials, and also has an extensive fire sprinkler system.

==== Landing craft ====
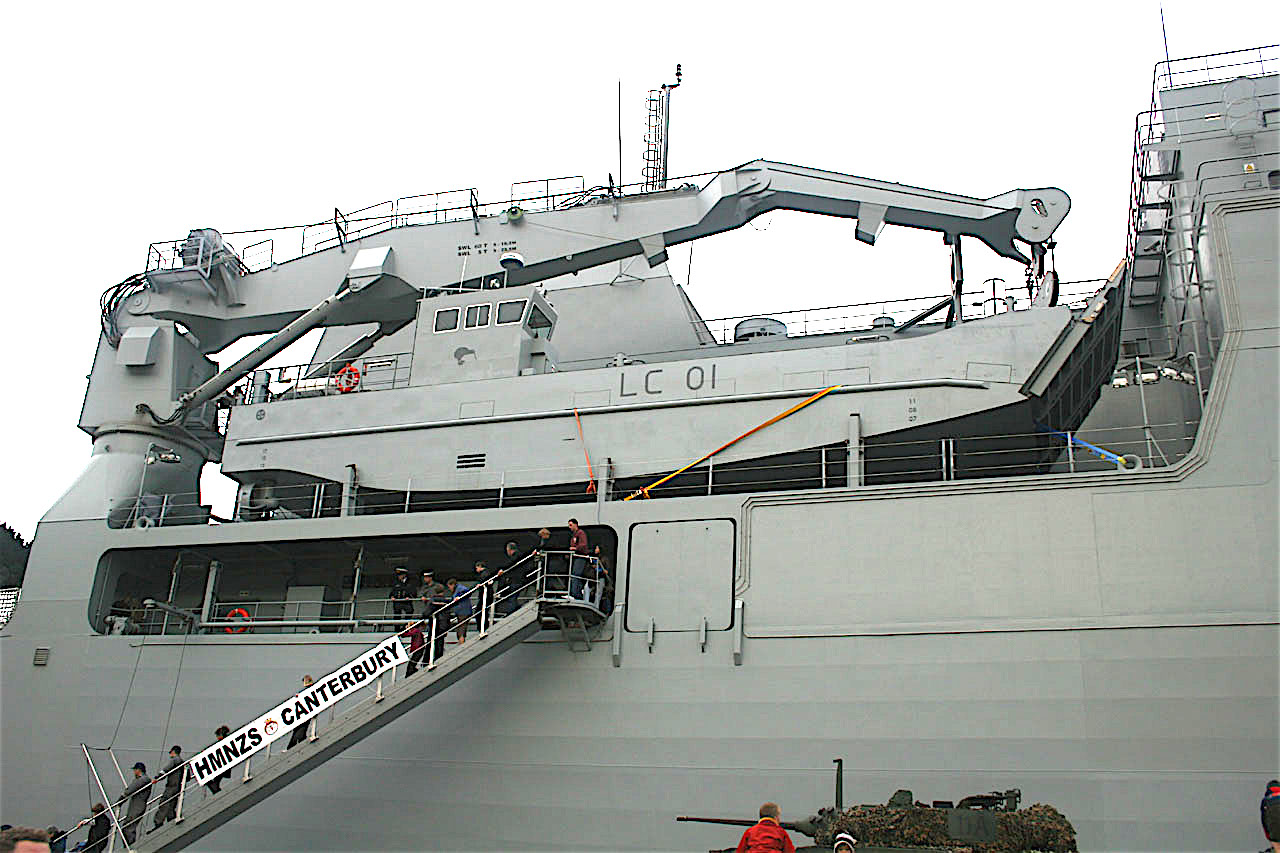
Embarked landing craft

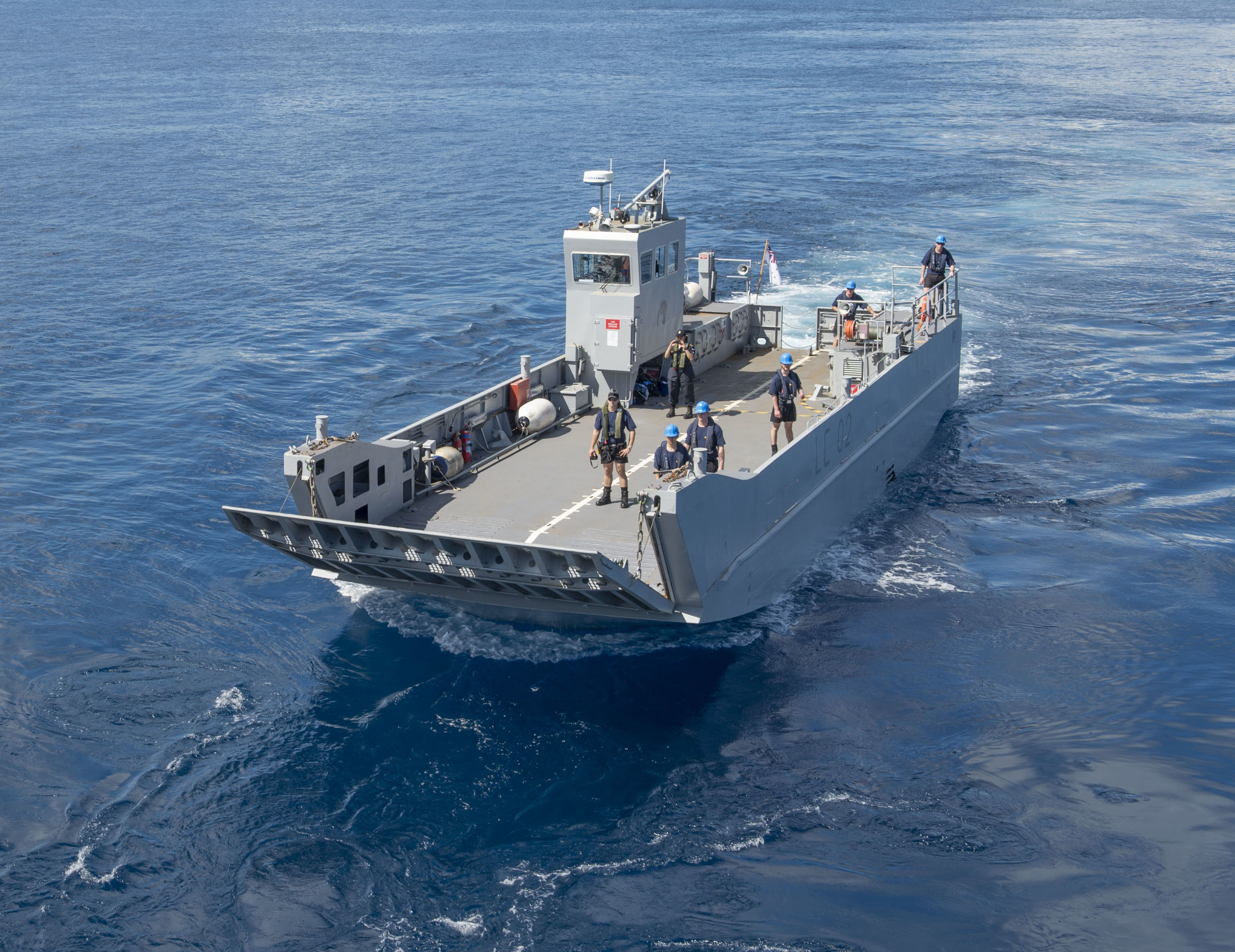
Deployed landing craft

The ship also carries two Landing Craft, Medium. The landing craft have a length of 23 metres (75 ft) and a displacement 55 tonnes (empty) to 100 tonnes (loaded with two NZLAVs). They are operated by a crew of three, using two Azimuth thrusters generating 235 kW.

The LCMs can be loaded from either of Canterbury's two 60 tonne cranes or via the stern ramp. To aid stern ramp loading, the MRV is fitted with Flippers to ensure that the LCM are aligned with the MRV. A ballasting system is fitted to allow for safe operations during loading. Once loaded, the LCM can conduct over-the-beach landings, with the boats mainly intended to be able to access beaches in the Pacific where no port facilities are available, for example during humanitarian missions.

Due to various issues (discussed further below) the original landing craft were decided in 2010 to need replacing. The fate of the current craft is currently undecided.

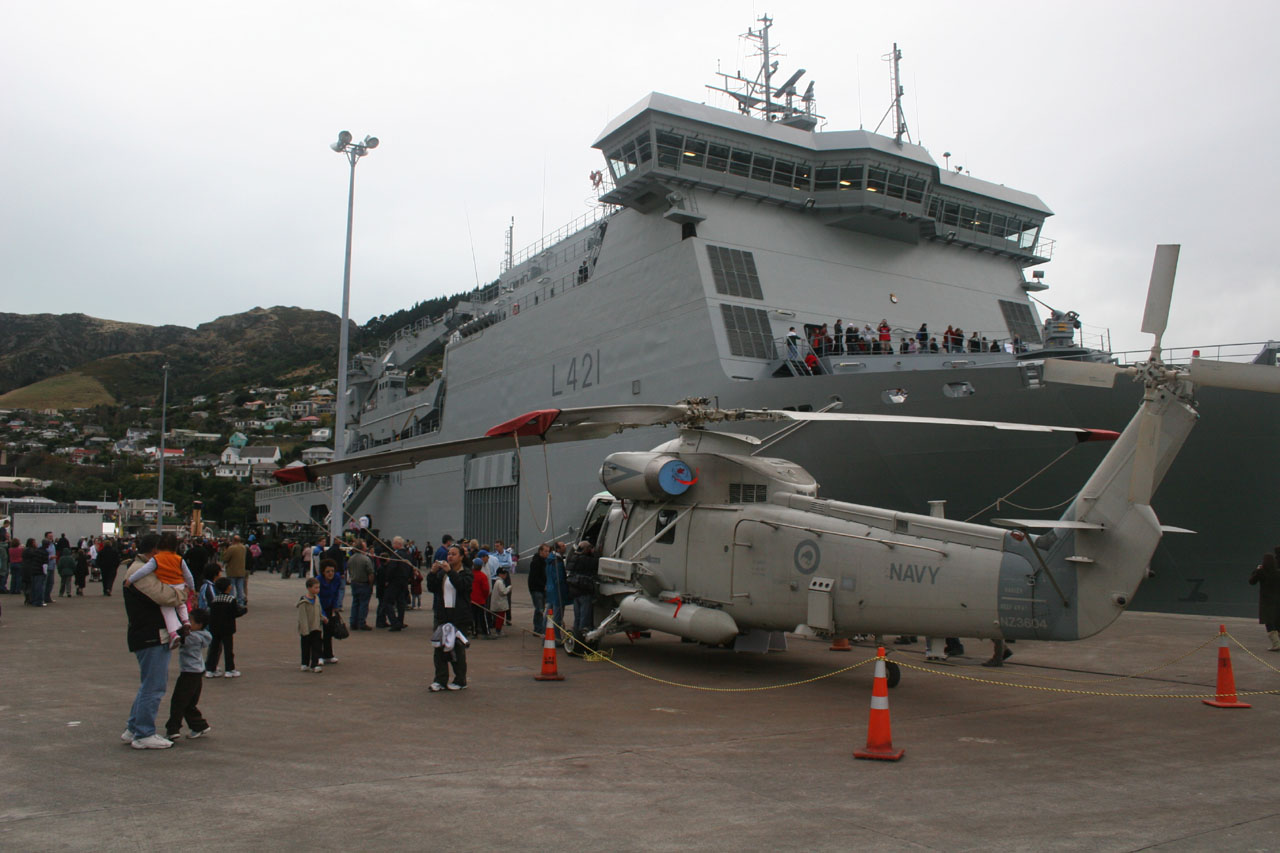
HMNZS Canterbury alongside at Lyttelton in 2007. An SH-2G Seasprite is sitting on the dockside

==== Helicopter facilities ====
Canterbury is able to accommodate up to four NH90 helicopters for deployment ashore in support of New Zealand Army operations and disaster relief activities. She is also capable of operating the SH-2G Seasprite and the helicopter deck is able to handle a Chinook-size helicopter.

==== Medical ====
Canterbury has a five-bed hospital ward, a two-bed sickbay, an operating theatre, a medical laboratory and a morgue. When fully activated, the ship can support a deployable maritime surgical capability broadly equivalent to a NATO Role 2 Basic medical treatment facility. The embarked facility has been used as a Maritime Role 2 environment, with an emergency operating suite comprising resuscitation spaces, intensive-care beds, an operating theatre and medium- to high-dependency patient holding.

The medical capability is normally generated by the New Zealand Defence Force's Deployable Health Organisation (DHO), a joint-service organisation responsible for providing deployable health support for training and operations. DHO personnel can include medical officers, surgeons, anaesthetists, nurses, medics, laboratory scientists and other clinical specialists, with the exact composition tailored to the mission. During Exercise Tropic Major in 2018, for example, a 21-person medical team embarked in Canterbury, including a surgeon, anaesthetist, nurses, medics and a medical scientist, and activated the ship's operating theatre, intensive-care capability, diagnostic imaging and blood-bank functions.

Under NATO medical doctrine, a Role 2 Basic (R2B) facility provides capabilities beyond those available at Role 1, including triage, essential diagnostics, damage-control resuscitation, damage-control surgery, short-term postoperative critical care, limited patient holding and medical supply. Role 2 Basic facilities may be land-based or afloat and are intended to stabilise patients sufficiently for onward evacuation and further treatment. In the maritime environment, NATO doctrine describes the equivalent capability as providing specialist-led resuscitation and damage-control surgery, typically supported by an operating table, basic laboratory and imaging capability, limited intensive care and patient holding.

The Role 2 capability is not permanently staffed at full strength as part of the ship's routine complement. Rather, Canterbury provides the maritime platform and built-in clinical infrastructure, while additional DHO personnel and medical equipment are embarked when a mission requires the enhanced capability. This allows the medical facility to be configured for amphibious operations, humanitarian assistance and disaster relief, or other deployments where surgical and critical-care support may be required at sea.

==== Others ====
The ship also contains a gym, workshops, an armoury and magazine, as well as offices for government officials embarked (such as Department of Conservation or NIWA scientists).

== Issues ==
The ship has been plagued by a number of issues, most of them related to faulty design, or design inappropriate for the intended operating conditions.

=== Problems with RHIBs and landing craft ===
Canterbury weathered her first strong storm during 10 July 2007 well, though she lost one of her rigid-hulled inflatable boats (RHIB) (and almost lost the other) to waves swamping her open boat bays while near Tauranga on the way to Auckland. The RHIB was found a week later, washed ashore on Great Barrier Island, 200 kilometres (120 mi) to the north.

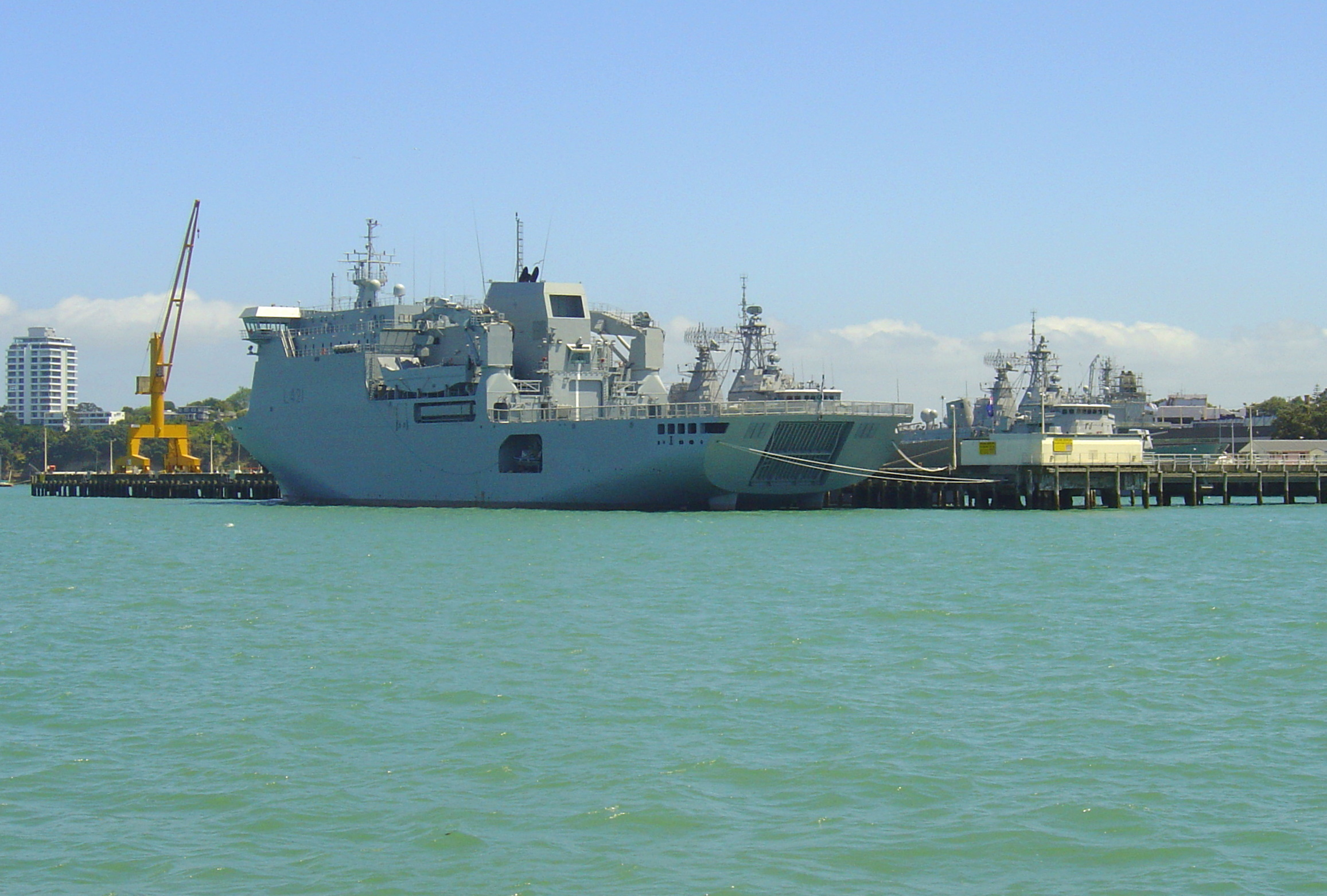
Berthed at the Devonport Naval Base, Auckland, November 2007 showing one of the boat bays located around 3 metres (9.8 ft) above the waterline.

A court of inquiry found that the loss was due to a known design flaw identified in tank testing. The flaw resulted in the loss of the RHIB and water entering the cargo deck after the doors were opened by the sea. As a result of this the doors were tied shut. The court of inquiry also reported slamming of the bow and propellers leaving the water. Options to resolve the design problems on the ship include closing the alcoves in which the ship's boats had been stowed. At the time the RHIB was lost, the ship's log records the weather conditions as being a wind strength of 60 knots (110 km/h; 69 mph), gusting to 73 knots (135 km/h; 84 mph), a swell of 6 metres (20 ft) (sea state six), and a completely overcast, very dark night. The alcoves are 3.3 metres (11 ft) above the waterline and were swamped by the waves and because the ship was experiencing severe motion, rolling up to 28 degrees to port, at a roll frequency of 11.5 seconds. The ship's anti-roll system will not function when the period of the ship's roll is less than 11.9 seconds. As a result, work was begun to relocate the boats to a less vulnerable location.

In October 2007, a crew member was killed when an RHIB capsized whilst being lowered into the sea. The Navy immediately began an inquiry into the accident. Defence Minister Phil Goff later reported that it was caused by the failure of a quick release shackle, which was now being replaced on all naval vessels.

In November 2007, Lieutenant General Jerry Mateparae said that certain issues were being discussed with the shipbuilder, including the location of the RHIB on the quarterdeck from which it was torn off during the storm in July, possible fatigue problems with the landing craft fittings, and some other issues.

New Zodiac inflatable sea boats were ordered from Tenix Australia to replace the two Gemini sea boats that were damaged.

In 2010, it was decided that two new landing craft would have to be built for Canterbury, as they had experienced a variety of issues, from material problems experienced with weak bow ramps to stability problems, which severely curtailed their usability. The Australian builders of the ship, BAE Systems, agreed to pay $85 million towards remedying the faults of the ship, including the construction of the new landing craft.

In 2013, two new shell doors on deck 3, and two new accommodation ladders on deck 5 were designed and installed by Taranaki engineering firms ITL and EHL. Marine Industrial Design and Babcock NZ made the necessary structural changes. The RHIB was able to be relocated as a result of the innovative design of the new accommodation ladders which can stow compactly inside the ship (5 m × 2.5 × 2.5 m), rather than being externally stored alongside the ship as before. Improved design of the ladders and the relocation of the RHIB has increased the safety and capability of the ship is no longer compromised.

=== Sea-keeping performance ===
In September 2008, an independent review of the safety and functionality of the ship revealed that some operating limitations will have to be accepted, as sea-keeping performance is poor in high sea states. The "selection of a commercial Roll-on, Roll-off (Ro-Ro) design" has "been at the root of differences of opinion between Tenix, the Ministry of Defence and New Zealand Defence Force and the shortfalls in performance". The issues included that the propellers can come out of the water when the ship pitches in rough seas, with concern that this may affect the ship's machinery. The report also recommended relocating the ship's boats (or protecting them from waves if relocation was not possible) and adding more ballast or improving the ballasting system of Canterbury.

These upgrades have now been completed. The RHIB alcoves are now further forward and higher, and more ballast has been added to help with sea keeping. This was all completed before the Pacific Partnership 2013 Exercise.

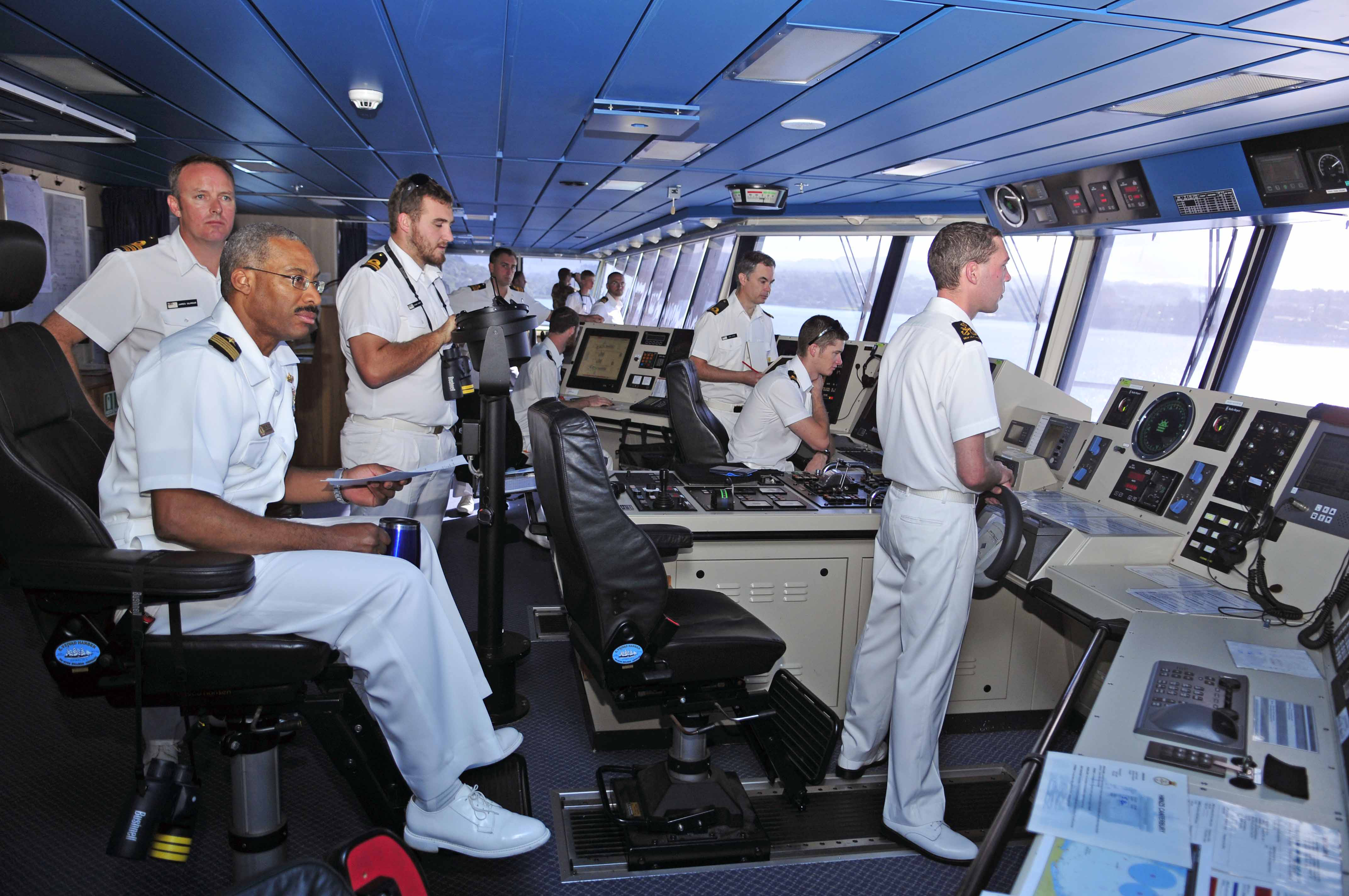
The bridge during Pacific Partnership 2011

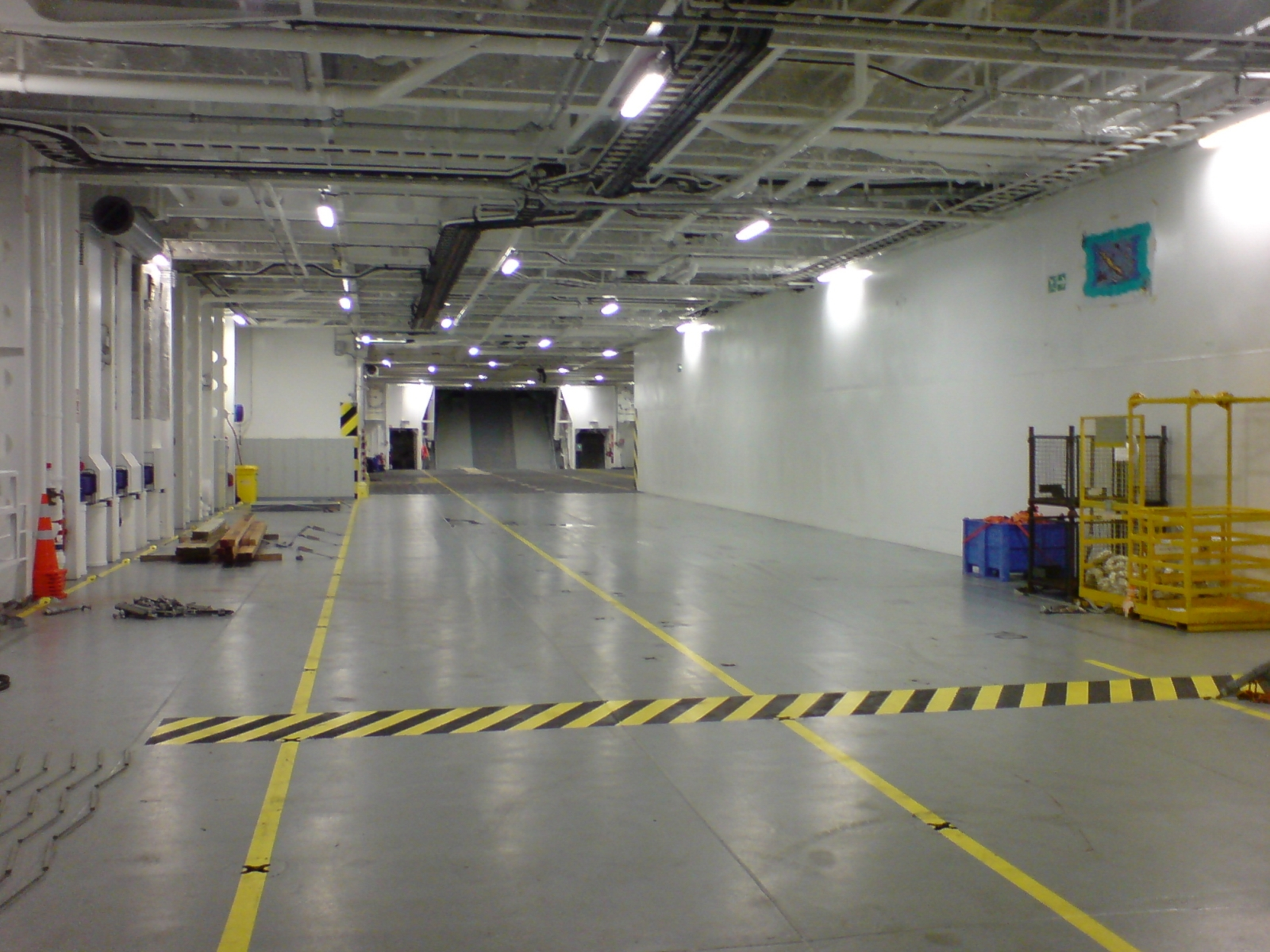
Aft view of the cargo deck, showing the stern ramp

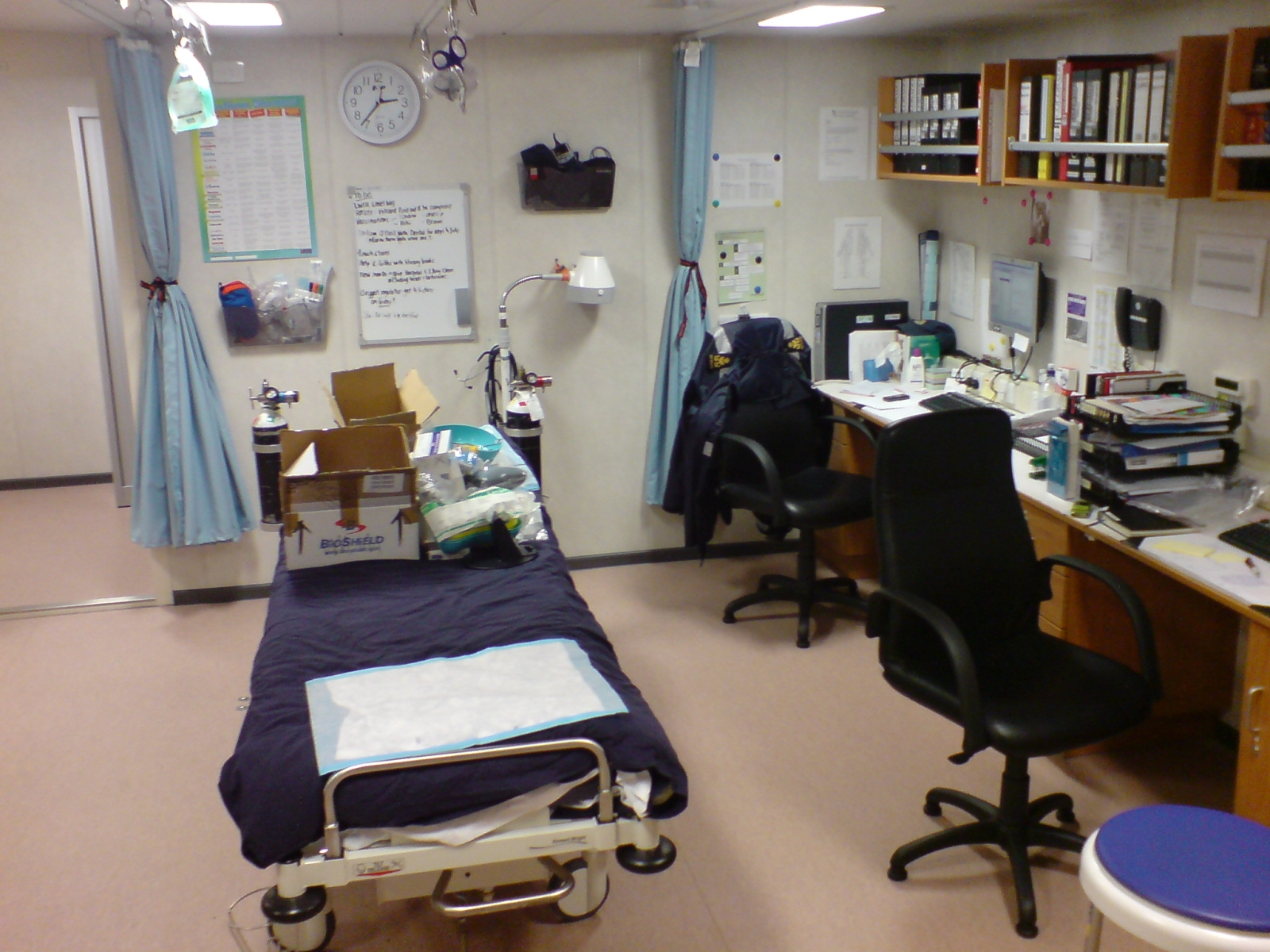
Consultation room of the infirmary

== See also ==
- Logistic ships of the Royal New Zealand Navy
- Project Protector
