= Tenix Defence =

Australian defence contractor

- Industry: Defence manufacturing
- Founded: 1997
- Founder: Transfield Services
- Defunct: June 2008
- Successor: BAE Systems Australia
- Headquarters: Sydney, Australia

Tenix Defence was Australia's largest defence contractor with core capabilities in aerospace, land, marine and electronic systems applications. BAE Systems announced its intention to acquire the company from Tenix Group in January 2008, and the acquisition was completed in June of that year for $775 million. BAE Systems Australia thus became Australia's largest defence contractor.

The company was formed in 1997 after it was split from parent company Transfield Services. It was part of Tenix Group until the defence contracting arm became known as Tenix Defence. It had two divisions: Tenix Marine, and Tenix Aerospace and Defence (comprising the former Land, Aerospace and Electronic Systems divisions).

== Land ==
Tenix Defence provided design, manufacture, modification and repairs to all major in-service military vehicles in Australia. It had over 300 employees in Wingfield, South Australia and Bandiana, Victoria. Wingfield was Australia's largest privately operated military vehicle facility, offering engineering, integrated logistic support, through-life support, configuration management, prototyping, warehousing, production and paint shop facilities.

At Bandiana, the Land Division provided logistic and garrison support services to Joint Logistics Command. This included warehousing and heavy grade maintenance of artillery, guided weapons, armoured and non-armoured vehicles and other Army weapon systems. Major projects undertaken by the Land Division included LAND 106 M113 Upgrade Project and 10 Armoured Limousines (based upon the Holden Caprice) for the Australian Attorney-General’s Department.

== Marine ==
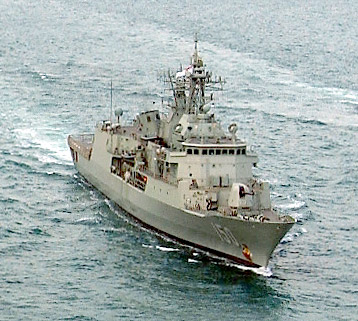
HMAS Anzac operating in support of Operation Enduring Freedom

Tenix Defence Marine Division was a major ship designer and builder in the Asia Pacific region focusing on the delivery of solutions to defence and commercial opportunities for both new build and support activities.

New construction, repairs and maintenance were undertaken at Australian shipyards in Williamstown, Victoria and Henderson, Western Australia. Both facilities also performed in-service support. The Whangārei site in New Zealand fabricated ANZAC superstructure and hull modules, plus built the four patrol boats for the RNZN Protector Project. Other facilities were located in Darwin, Cairns, Brisbane and Sydney. The division had experience in designing, building and delivering more than 200 naval, paramilitary and specialist vessels.

Ships built by Tenix Defence include ten Anzac class frigates and two Protector-class offshore patrol vessels. In June 2007, the Australian Minister for Defence announced that Tenix Defence was the preferred tenderer for the construction of the two Canberra class large amphibious ships known as Landing Helicopter Dock (LHD) ships at a cost of $3 billion. The ships, HMAS Canberra and HMAS Adelaide, entered into service in 2014 and 2015 respectively. Tenix had proposed to build the Navantia design in partnership with the Spanish company.

== Aerospace ==
In 1998, De Havilland Australia was purchased.

Through its heritage, Tenix Defence had an unbroken chain of experience in the Australian aviation industry spanning six decades. The Aerospace Division was established in 1998 specifically to provide a support capability for Australian Defence Force (ADF) aircraft programs.

It gained Authorised Engineering Organisation Certification to conduct design on a number of defence aircraft. The Division also held an Australian Department of Defence certification for Earned Value Management. It was managed from Melbourne, and had its own hangar at Melbourne Airport. The division also worked on projects with the ADF on-site at HMAS Albatross at Nowra, RAAF Base Williamtown and RAAF Base Edinburgh.

== Electronic Systems Division ==
Electronic Systems Division (ESD) was the technology and electronic systems hub of Tenix Defence and maintained close ties with the Defence Science and Technology Organisation. It was a provider of integrated solutions for Network Enabled Systems, Intelligence, Surveillance and Reconnaissance, Electronic Warfare and Network Centric Warfare (NCW).

Major projects undertaken by the Electronic Systems Division included Advanced Air Defence Simulator (AADS) to train Australian Army operators in the SAAB Bofors Dynamics RBS-70 Ground Based Air Defence weapon, LAND 53, Phase 1E Ninox Ground Surveillance Radar, Phase 1F Ninox Thermal Surveillance System and Phase 2B Ninox Unattended Ground Sensors.
