= List of ship launches in 1974 =

The list of ship launches in 1974 includes a chronological list of ships launched in 1974. In cases where no official launching ceremony was held, the date built or completed may be used instead.

Date	Ship	Class and type	Builder	Location	Country	Notes
12 January	Richard B. Russell	Sturgeon-class submarine	Newport News Shipbuilding	Newport News, Virginia	United States	For United States Navy.
22 January	U-28	Type 206 submarine	Nordseewerke	Emden	West Germany	For German Navy.
January	Grima	Ferry	Bideford Shipyard (1973) Ltd	Bideford	United Kingdom	For Shetland Islands Council.
5 February	Arrow	Type 21 frigate	Yarrow Shipbuilders	Glasgow	United Kingdom	For Royal Navy.
7 February	Golden Odyssey	Cruise ship	Helsingør Skibsværft og Maskinbyggeri	Helsingør	Denmark	For Royal Cruise Lines.
9 February	Scharhörn	Multi-purpose vessel	Rheinwerft Walsum	Duisburg-Walsum	West Germany	For Federal Ministry of Transport and Digital Infrastructure
22 February	Paul F. Foster	Spruance-class destroyer	Ingalls Shipbuilding	Pascagoula, Mississippi	United States	For United States Navy.
22 February	Cardiff	Type 42 destroyer	Vickers Shipbuilding and Engineering	Barrow-in-Furness	United Kingdom	For Royal Navy.
22 February	Kuroshio	Uzushio-class submarine			Japan	For Japanese Navy.
1 March	Pukaki	Lake-class patrol boat	Brooke Marine Ltd.	Lowestoft	United Kingdom	For Royal New Zealand Navy.
15 March	Agpa	Agdlek-class cutter	Svendborg Ship Yard		Denmark	For Royal Danish Navy.
21 March	Falke	Albatros-class fast attack craft	Lürssen	Bremen	West Germany	For German Navy.
21 March	Makurdi	Patrol boat	Brooke Marine Ltd.	Lowestoft	United Kingdom	For Nigerian Navy.
23 March	World Cavalier	Supertanker	Harland & Wolff	Belfast	United Kingdom	For Worldwide Shipping Co.
28 March	Viking 5	Ferry	Meyer Werft	Papenburg	West Germany	For Rederi Ab Sally
March	Marsopa	Daphné-class submarine	Bazán	Cartagena	Spain	For Spanish Navy.
4 April	U-30	Type 206 submarine	Nordseewerke	Emden	West Germany	For German Navy.
5 April	Arica	Type 209 submarine	Howaldtswerke-Deutsche Werft	Kiel	Germany	For Peruvian Navy.
6 April	Arco Thames	Dredger	Appledore Shipbuilders Ltd.	Appledore	United Kingdom	For Consolidated Gold Fields Ltd.
6 April	Los Angeles	Los Angeles-class submarine	Newport News Shipbuilding	Newport News, Virginia	United States	For United States Navy.
10 April	Pijao	Type 209 submarine	Howaldtswerke-Deutsche Werft	Kiel	West Germany	For Colombian Navy.
4 May	Lundy Shore	Offshore supply vessel	Appledore Shipbuilders Ltd.	Appledore	United Kingdom	For Offshore Marine Ltd.
8 May	Rotoiti	Lake-class patrol boat	Brooke Marine Ltd.	Lowestoft	United Kingdom	For Royal New Zealand Navy.
25 May	Hadejia	Patrol boat	Brooke Marine Ltd.	Lowestoft	United Kingdom	For Nigerian Navy.
25 May	Kinkaid	Spruance-class destroyer	Ingalls Shipbuilding	Pascagoula, Mississippi	United States	For United States Navy.
25 May	U-23	Type 206 submarine	Nordseewerke	Emden	West Germany	For German Navy.
29 May	Teshio	Chikugo-class destroyer escort			Japan	For Japanese Navy.
21 June	Coventry	Type 42 destroyer	Cammell Laird	Birkenhead	United Kingdom	For Royal Navy.
16 July	Tayrona	Type 209 submarine	Howaldtswerke-Deutsche Werft	Kiel	West Germany	For Colombian Navy.
18 July	Saipan	Tarawa-class amphibious assault ship	Ingalls Shipbuilding	Pascagoula, Mississippi	United States	For United States Navy.
19 July	Svea Corona	Svea Corona-class ferry	Dubegion-Normandie	Nantes	France	For Rederi AB Svea
25 July	Taupo	Lake-class patrol boat	Brooke Marine Ltd.	Lowestoft	United Kingdom	For Royal New Zealand Navy.
26 July	Mette Mols	Ferry	Helsingør Værft A/S	Helsingør	Denmark	For Mols Linien A/S.
16 August	Wimpey Seawolf	Offshore supply vessel	Appledore Shipbuilders Ltd.	Appledore	United Kingdom	For Wimpey (Marine) Ltd.
17 August	Indomptable	Redoutable-class submarine	DCNS		France	For French Navy.
22 August	Yoshino	Chikugo-class destroyer escort			Japan	For Japanese Navy.
24 August	Hewitt	Spruance-class destroyer	Ingalls Shipbuilding	Pascagoula, Mississippi	United States	For United States Navy.
3 September	Hawea	Lake-class patrol boat	Brooke Marine Ltd.	Lowestoft	United Kingdom	For Royal New Zealand Navy.
15 September	Wellamo	Svea Corona-class Ferry	Dubegion-Normandie	Nantes	France	For Finland Steamship Company.
16 September	Orion	Oberon-class submarine	Scotts Shipbuilding and Engineering	Greenock	United Kingdom	For Royal Australian Navy.
18 September	Alacrity	Type 21 frigate	Yarrow Shipbuilders	Glasgow	United Kingdom	For Royal Navy.
20 September	Cunard Countess	Cruise ship	Burmeister & Wain	Copenhagen	Denmark	For Cunard Line.
28 September	Sheppey	Tanker	Appledore Shipbuilders Ltd.	Appledore	United Kingdom	For Shell-Mex & BP Ltd.
6 October	Canadian Bridge	Bulk carrier	Harland & Wolff	Belfast	United Kingdom	For Bibby Shipping.
12 October	Fastnet Shore	Offshore supply vessel	Appledore Shipbuilders Ltd.	Appledore	United Kingdom	For Offshore Marine Ltd.
19 October	Philadelphia	Los Angeles-class submarine	Electric Boat	Groton, Connecticut	United States	For United States Navy.
23 October	Atılay	Atılay-class submarine	Howaldtswerke-Deutsche Werft	Kiel	West Germany	For Turkish Navy.
26 October	Nils Holgersson	Roll-on/roll-off ferry	Werft Nobiskrug	Rendsburg	West Germany	For TT-Line.
9 November	Santísima Trinidad	Type 42 destroyer	ANFE Rio Santiago	Ensenada	Argentina	For Argentine Navy.
10 November	Ioannis Colocotronis	Europatanker ultra large crude carrier	AG Weser	Bremen	West Germany	Viavela Armadora S.A
16 November	Harty	Tanker	Appledore Shipbuilders Ltd.	Appledore	United Kingdom	For Shell-Mex & BP Ltd.
28 November	Vasily Chapayev	Project 1134A Berkut A large anti-submarine ship	Zhdanov	Leningrad	Soviet Union	For Soviet Navy.
30 November	Superb	Swiftsure-class submarine	Vickers Shipbuilding and Engineering	Barrow-in-Furness	United Kingdom	For Royal Navy.
13 December	Lotorium	Supertanker	Harland & Wolff	Belfast	United Kingdom	For Shell Tankers Ltd.
14 December	Virginia	Virginia-class cruiser	Newport News Shipbuilding	Newport News, Virginia	United States	For United States Navy.
18 December	Lemnos		Hellenic General Enterprises	Perama	Greece	For Lemnos Maritime Co. GmbH.
19 December	Elliot	Spruance-class destroyer	Ingalls Shipbuilding	Pascagoula, Mississippi	United States	For United States Navy.
19 December	Maren Mols	Ferry	Helsingør Værft A/S	Helsingør	Denmark	For Mols Linien A/S.
31 December	Silloth Stag	Coaster	Beverley Shipbuilding & Engineering Co. Ltd	Beverley	United Kingdom	For Stag Line Ltd.
December	Cunard Conquest	Cruise ship	Burmeister & Wain	Copenhagen	Denmark	For Cunard Line.
December	Narval	Daphné-class submarine	Bazán	Cartagena	Spain	For Spanish Navy.
Unknown date	Dorset Belle	Passenger ship	J. Bolson & Son Ltd.	Poole	United Kingdom	For Crosons Ltd.
Unknown date	Langdale	Fishing trawler	Bideford Shipyard (1973) Ltd	Bideford	United Kingdom	For Bridlington Trawlers Ltd.
Unknown date	Puerto Rico	Ro-ro cargo ship	Sun Shipbuilding & Drydock Co.	Chester, Pennsylvania	United States	For Navieras de Puerto Rico Steamship Company
Unknown date	Solent Scene	Passenger ship	Bideford Shipyard (1973) Ltd	Bideford	United Kingdom	For private owner.
Unknown date	Spessart	Rhön-class tanker	Kröger	Rendsburg	West Germany	For German Navy.
