= HMNZS Taupo (1975) =

Patrol vessel in the Royal New Zealand Navy

History

New Zealand
- Builder: Brooke Marine, United Kingdom
- Commissioned: 1975
- Decommissioned: 1991
- Identification: Pennant number: P3570
- Fate: Decommissioned and sold

General characteristics
- Class & type: Lake-class inshore patrol vessel
- Displacement: 105 tons standard 135 tons full load
- Length: 107.8 ft (32.9 m)
- Beam: 20 ft (6.1 m)
- Draught: 11.1 ft (3.4 m)
- Propulsion: 2 × Paxman 12Y JCM diesels 3000 hp, 2 shafts
- Speed: 25 knots (46 km/h; 29 mph)
- Range: 3,000 nmi (5,600 km; 3,500 mi)
- Complement: 21
- Sensors & processing systems: Navigation radar: Racal Decca 916 I Band
- Armament: 2 × 12.7mm machine guns; 1 × 81mm mortar

HMNZS Taupo was a Lake-class patrol vessel of the Royal New Zealand Navy. Taupo was commissioned in 1975 and decommissioned in 1991, serving for 16 years.

Taupo was one of three ships of this name to serve in the Royal New Zealand Navy and was named after Lake Taupo.

== Design ==
In the early 1970s the Royal New Zealand Navy sought a replacement for its ageing SMDL patrol craft, which dated back to World War II. These vessels would be used for fisheries patrols as well as for territorial surveillance, complimenting the existing capability provided by P-3 Orion aircraft and frigates. Tenders for construction of the Lake-class was awarded to the UK based Brooke Marine, with an initial order of six ships. This order was subsequently reduced to four. The names of the four ships were based on the previous Loch-class frigates that had previously served in the RNZN. The names chosen for the Lake class vessels were Hawea, Pukaki, Rotoiti and Taupo.

== Construction ==
Taupo was laid down in July 1974, and was built by Brooke Marine at their shipyard in Lowestoft, in the United Kingdom. Construction was completed by November 1974, with the ship being delivered and commissioned into the RNZN by July 1975. Taupo was commissioned on 29 July 1975.

== Service history ==
=== Service life ===
Taupo began her shakedown cruise on 5 August 1975. By August 1975, she took up fisheries and territorial patrol duties. Over the course of her service life, Taupo additionally took part in fleet exercises, as well as use with the Royal New Zealand Naval Volunteer Reserve.

During their initial service life the ship was beset with engine vibration problems. The Lake class gained a reputation for poor performance in heavy seas, with a number of sailors injured. Taupo would be regularly refit in order to attempt to resolve these issues. In addition, all patrol craft were subject to a number of fuel shortages throughout the 70s and 80s, resulting in significant time spent laid up at Devonport Naval Base.

=== Sinking of the MS Mikhail Lermontov ===
Taupo was one of a number of ships that came to the assistance of the sinking Soviet cruise liner Mikhail Lermontov on 16 February 1986. Commander by Lt. Batcheler, Taupo assisted in both the recovery of passengers, as well as helping to coordinate rescue efforts.

=== Decommissioning ===
Taupo served with the RNZN until 1990 when she and her sister ships were decommissioned and sold off. The ship was replaced by the Moa class, and later Lake-class inshore patrol vessels. HMNZS Taupo, commissioned in 2009, carries the same namesake and pennant of Taupo.

== See also ==
- HMNZS Pukaki
- HMNZS Rotoiti
- HMNZS Hawea
- Patrol boats of the Royal New Zealand Navy
- Royal New Zealand Navy
