= HMNZS Hawea =

Three ships of the Royal New Zealand Navy have been named HMNZS Hawea:

- HMNZS Hawea (F422), was a frigate, 1948–1965
- HMNZS Hawea (1975), was a Lake-class patrol vessel, 1975–1991, pennant number P3571
- HMNZS Hawea (2007), is a Protector-class inshore patrol vessel, launched in 2007, pennant number P3571
