= HMNZS Rotoiti =

HMNZS Rotoiti has been the name of three ships of the Royal New Zealand Navy:

- HMNZS Rotoiti (F425), was a Loch-class frigate, formerly HMS Loch Katrine, 1948–1967
- HMNZS Rotoiti (1975), was a Lake-class patrol vessel, 1975–1991, pennant number P3569
- HMNZS Rotoiti (2007), was a Protector-class inshore patrol boat, launched in 2007, pennant number P3569
