= Hāwea =

Hāwea or Hawea can refer to:

- Lake Hāwea, a lake in New Zealand
- Lake Hāwea (town), a settlement beside the lake
- Hāwea Flat, a settlement in the South Island of New Zealand
- Hāwea River, a river in New Zealand
- Hāwea Conservation Park, a protected area in New Zealand
- Hāwea / Bligh Sound, a fiord in New Zealand
- HMNZS Hawea, three ships of the Royal New Zealand Navy
- Hawea Mataira, a dual-code rugby football player who represented New Zealand
