= HMNZS Taupo =

Three ships of the Royal New Zealand Navy have been named HMNZS Taupo:

- HMNZS Taupo (F423), was a frigate, 1948–1962
- HMNZS Taupo (1975), was a Lake-class patrol vessel, 1975–1991, pennant number P3570
- HMNZS Taupo (2008), is a Protector-class inshore patrol boat, launched in 2008, pennant number P3570
