= Patrol boats of the Royal New Zealand Navy =

Commissioned patrol boats of the Royal New Zealand Navy from after World War II.

== Class types ==
=== Lake class patrol vessel ===
main article: Lake-class patrol vessel

Name	Dates	Career	Fate
HMNZS Hawea (1975)	1975–1991		
HMNZS Pukaki (1975)	1975–1991		
HMNZS Rotoiti (1975)	1975–1999		
HMNZS Taupo (1975)	1975–1990		

=== Moa class inshore patrol boats ===
Name	Dates	Career	Fate
HMNZS Hinau (P3556)	1985–2007		On retirement renamed Sea Patroller and patrols Cook Strait cables
HMNZS Kahu (A04)	1978–2009	Training vessel, backup diving tender	
HMNZS Kiwi (P3554)	1983–2007		
HMNZS Moa (P3553)	1984–2007		
HMNZS Wakakura (P3555)	1985–2007		

=== Lake class inshore patrol boats ===
Name	Dates	Career	Fate
HMNZS Hawea (P3571)	2008–current		In active service
HMNZS Pukaki (P3568)	2008–2019		Decommissioned, Sold to Irish Navy
HMNZS Rotoiti (P3569)	2007–2019		Decommissioned, Sold to Irish Navy
HMNZS Taupo (P3570)	2008–current		In active service

=== Protector class offshore patrol boats ===
Name	Dates	Career	Fate
HMNZS Otago (P148)	2007–current		In active service
HMNZS Wellington (P55)	2007–current		In active service

== See also ==
- List of active Royal New Zealand Navy ships
