= Military history of New Zealand in Malaysia =

The New Zealand armed forces saw action in Malaysia throughout the 1950s and 1960s, first as part of the British Commonwealth response to the Malayan Emergency, and then in defence of Malaysia in the Indonesia–Malaysia confrontation.

== Malayan Emergency 1948–1960 ==
=== Background ===
The Malayan Emergency was declared by the British government on 18 June 1948 after three British rubber plantation workers were murdered by insurgents of the Communist Party of Malaya (CPM), this attack is known as the Sungai Siput incident. The CPM formed the Malayan National Liberation Army (MNLA), a communist guerrilla organisation which fought for an independent Malaya free from colonialism. With the state of emergency in place, British authorities were able to arrest and detain without usual procedures.

=== New Zealand's Involvement ===
New Zealand's first contribution came in 1949, when C-47 Dakotas of RNZAF No. 41 Squadron were attached to the Royal Air Force's Far East Air Force. The Dakotas were used to drop supplies to British and Malay forces engaging the MNLA, and one aircraft was stationed permanently in Kuala Lumpur to carry out this role, away from No. 41 Squadron's usual station in Hong Kong. By the time the New Zealand planes were withdrawn in December 1951, they had carried out 211 sorties, dropping 284,000 kilograms of supplies.

From 1949 there were also several New Zealand Army officers serving on secondment to British units in Malaya. A further ten officers, along with fourteen non-commissioned officers arrived in January 1951 leading the 1st Battalion of the Fiji Infantry Regiment. Commanded initially by Lieutenant-Colonel R. A. Tinker the unit gained a high reputation for effectiveness in operations against the guerrillas. By the time it was withdrawn in 1956 about forty New Zealanders had served with it, and two had been accidentally killed. In 1954 a Royal New Zealand Navy frigate, HMNZS Pukaki, carried out a bombardment of a suspected guerilla camp, while operating with the Royal Navy's Far East Fleet – the first of a number of bombardments by RNZN ships over the next five years.

New Zealand became more directly involved in the Emergency in 1955, following its decision to contribute forces to the British Commonwealth Far East Strategic Reserve, the primary role of which was to deter communist aggression in South-East Asia, and to provide a capacity for the immediate implementation of defence plans in the event that deterrence failed. As a secondary role, the forces committed to the Reserve were permitted to take part in actions against the guerrillas. The initial New Zealand contribution to this Reserve was a Special Air Service squadron which, commanded by Major Frank Rennie, served with the British Special Air Service's 22nd Regiment. It numbered six officers and 127 men. Their operations consisted of seeking out the guerrillas in their jungle sanctuary. From April 1956 this squadron was deployed to the Fort Brooke area, bordering the states of Perak and Kelantan, and during 1957 it operated in Negri Sembilan, between the towns of Seremban, Kuala Pilah, and Tampin. In both locations the squadron was involved in successful operations eliminating the local MNLA groups. In all, this squadron spent two years on service in Malaya, and the soldiers spent an average of 17 months on jungle operations.

On 1 May 1955, the Royal New Zealand Air Force carried out its first operational strike mission since the Second World War and its first with jet aircraft, de Havilland Vampires of No. 14 Squadron. Between April 1955 and March 1958 the squadron was re-equipped with de Havilland Venoms and mounted 115 strike missions, which fell into two categories – 'Firedogs' (pre-planned bombing, strafing, and rocket attacks against suspected guerrilla targets) and 'Smash Hits' (immediate on-call strikes against opportunity targets in response to a guerilla raid or 'hot' information). The squadron was replaced in 1958 by No. 75 Squadron flying English Electric Canberras from its station in Tengah. The effectiveness of the air strikes against targets in the jungle was inevitably limited but they provided much valuable training experience to the New Zealand pilots. In July 1955 No. 41 Squadron returned to Malaya and resumed supply dropping operations in support of anti-guerrilla forces, this time using the highly effective Bristol Freighter aircraft.

From March 1958, the 1st Battalion of the New Zealand Regiment replaced the New Zealand SAS Squadron and as part of the 28th Commonwealth Infantry Brigade Group took part in operations designed to clear Perak of insurgents. It mounted a series of deep jungle patrols from Ipoh and Grik, in which it achieved great success. By the time the 2nd Battalion of the New Zealand Regiment arrived in late 1959, to replace the 1st Battalion, most of the Communist guerrillas had retreated across the border into southern Thailand and the Malayan government saw the security situation to be stable enough to declare the Emergency over on 31 July 1960. New Zealand soldiers would be periodically deployed to Border Security Areas as part of counter-insurgency measures over the next four years.

Of the 1,300 New Zealanders to serve in the Malayan Emergency between 1948 and 1964, fifteen lost their lives, including only three killed as a result of enemy action and the crew of a Bristol Freighter which flew into a mountain in 1956. For a New Zealand Army with little experience of jungle warfare, the Emergency marked a new departure and an important stage in the development of the New Zealand armed forces from a non-regular to a regular framework of organisation. Experience gained in Malaya helped the New Zealand armed forces when they returned to South-East Asia's jungles during the Indonesia–Malaysia confrontation and the Vietnam War.

== Second Communist insurgency in Malaysia, 1968–1989 ==
A renewed communist insurgency in Malaysia began in 1968, after surviving elements of the Communist Party of Malaya and its armed wing, the Malayan National Liberation Army, had regrouped in southern Thailand following the end of the Malayan Emergency in 1960. The conflict, sometimes referred to as the Second Emergency, continued until the Hat Yai Peace Agreement of 2 December 1989, when the Communist Party of Malaya reached a settlement with the Malaysian and Thai governments.

New Zealand did not deploy combat forces to fight the renewed insurgency in the same manner as it had during the earlier Malayan Emergency or the Indonesia–Malaysia Confrontation. The campaign was primarily conducted by Malaysian security forces, including the Malaysian Army, Police Field Force and specialist formations, with cooperation from Thailand in the border areas.

New Zealand nevertheless retained a military presence in the Malaysia-Singapore region during much of the period. 1st Battalion, Royal New Zealand Infantry Regiment moved from Terendak Camp in Malaysia to Singapore in December 1969, was based at Nee Soon, and then moved to Dieppe Barracks in June 1971. New Zealand maintained its battalion in Singapore until 1989. Following the end of the ANZUK Force in 1974, New Zealand retained forces in the region through the New Zealand Force South East Asia, although the New Zealand Defence Force did not classify this service as operational for the purposes of the New Zealand Operational Service Medal.

The New Zealand presence during the later insurgency was therefore one of regional commitment, training, deterrence and support to the Five Power Defence Arrangements, rather than direct participation in Malaysian counter-insurgency operations. The distinction has been relevant to later debates over recognition of New Zealand service in Southeast Asia after 1974, since personnel served forward in a region affected by an active insurgency, but outside the formal operational categories applied to earlier service in Malaya, Borneo and Vietnam.

== Indonesia–Malaysia Confrontation 1963–66 ==
As a part of its withdrawal from its Southeast Asian colonies, the United Kingdom moved to combine its colonies in Borneo – Sarawak and British North Borneo – with those on peninsular Malaya, to form the Federation of Malaysia. This move was opposed by the government of Indonesia; President Sukarno argued that Malaysia was a puppet of the British, and that the consolidation of Malaysia would increase British control over the region, threatening Indonesia's independence. The Indonesia–Malaysia confrontation began on 20 January 1963 when Indonesian Foreign Minister Subandrio announced that Indonesia would pursue a policy of Konfrontasi (Confrontation) with Malaysia.

British forces conducted a successful counter-insurgency campaign against Indonesian guerillas (often regular Indonesian Army soldiers) but it was a strain on resources and by early 1965 60,000 British and Malaysian servicemen were deployed in the region, together with a Royal Navy surface fleet of more than eighty warships, including two aircraft-carriers. Repeated requests had been made since December 1963 to New Zealand and Australia to provide combat forces for Borneo. Prime Minister Keith Holyoake's National Party government initially refused – while it was felt that Malaysia should definitely be supported against an enemy that had clearly acted as an aggressor, the government did not wish to see New Zealand embroiled in a major war with Indonesia. Indonesia is New Zealand's closest Asian neighbour and there was a fear of spoiling future relations. In refusing, the government argued that present British and Malaysian forces were sufficient to contain the insurgency. In 1964 Sukarno decided to intensify the Confrontation by extending military operations to the Malay Peninsula. When 98 Indonesian paratroopers landed in Johore in September, the 1st Battalion, Royal New Zealand Infantry Regiment was one of the only Commonwealth units in the region and with the New Zealand government's permission hunted down the infiltrators. The following month, 52 soldiers landed in Pontian on the Johore–Malacca border and were also captured by New Zealand soldiers.

A change in New Zealand policy came as Sukarno increased the flow of Indonesian insurgents into Borneo and British military resources were stretched to almost breaking point. The New Zealand government could no longer deny the genuine appeals for assistance and the first New Zealand deployment was made to fight the insurgency – a Special Air Service detachment and the 1st Battalion, Royal New Zealand Infantry Regiment, along with former Royal Navy minesweepers HMNZS Hickleton and Santon and the frigate HMNZS Taranaki. The SAS detachment, and its later replacement, took part in Operation Claret alongside British and Australian SAS soldiers. The 1st Battalion did not see action until May 1965, when it relieved a Gurkha battalion in Sarawak, where it was involved in a series of skirmishes. The battalion was relieved in October 1965 and was not to see further combat – when it returned to Borneo in May 1966, Confrontation was essentially over. Towards the end of 1965, General Suharto came to power in Indonesia, following a coup d'état. Due to this domestic conflict, Indonesian interest in pursuing the war with Malaysia declined, and combat eased. On 28 May 1966 at a conference in Bangkok, the Malaysian and Indonesian governments declared the conflict was over. Violence ended in June, and a peace treaty was signed on 11 August and ratified two days later.
