= 1959 New Zealand gallantry awards =

Awards list for New Zealand

The 1959 New Zealand gallantry awards were announced via a special honours list dated 29 June 1959, and recognised one member of the New Zealand military forces for distinguished service and devotion to duty during the Malayan Emergency.

== Mentioned in despatches ==
- Flight Lieutenant Arthur David Malcolm Winkelmann – Royal New Zealand Air Force; of Hamilton.
