= HMNZS Hickleton =

History

United Kingdom
- Name: Hickleton
- Builder: John I Thornycroft, Southampton
- Launched: 26 January 1955
- Identification: Pennant number: M1131

New Zealand
- Name: Hickleton
- Commissioned: 10 April 1965
- Decommissioned: December 1966
- Identification: Pennant number: M1131

Argentina
- Name: Neuquen
- Acquired: 1967
- Decommissioned: 1996
- Identification: Pennant number: M1

General characteristics
- Displacement: 440 long tons (450 t)
- Length: 153 ft (46.6 m)
- Beam: 28.9 ft (8.8 m)
- Draught: 8.2 ft (2.5 m)
- Propulsion: 2 × Paxman Deltic 18A-7A diesel engines at 3,000 bhp (2,200 kW)
- Speed: Cruise 13 knots (24 km/h) on one engine. Max 16 knots (30 km/h) on both
- Range: 2,500 nautical miles (4,600 km) at 12 knots (22 km/h)
- Complement: 32
- Armament: 1 x Bofors 40 mm gun; 2 × 20 mm (2 × 1) – increased for NZ service

Outline of a British Ton-class minesweeper.

HMNZS Hickleton (M1131) was a Ton-class minesweeper that operated in the Royal Navy and the Royal New Zealand Navy (RNZN). She was named after a small village near Doncaster.

Built for the Royal Navy by John I Thornycroft of Southampton, the minesweeper was launched on 26 January 1955 and later commissioned as HMS Hickleton

She was commissioned into the RNZN in 1965 and decommissioned in 1966. After leaving New Zealand service, she was transferred to the Argentine Navy and renamed ARA Neuquen (M1).

== Operational history ==
=== New Zealand ===
Early in 1965, Indonesia was employing a policy of confrontation against Malaysia. New Zealand agreed to assist Malaysia by deploying two Royal Navy minesweepers then in reserve at Singapore. These were commissioned into the RNZN on 10 April 1965 and joined the Royal Navy's 11th Minesweeping squadron (also Ton class), taking part in anti-infiltration patrols in Malaysian waters.

In her first year Hickleton, together with her sister ship Santon, carried out 200 patrols, with 20 incidents involving intruding Indonesians, often taking as prisoners those aboard the intercepted craft. By the time the Indonesian confrontation policy ended in August 1966 Santon had steamed 62,000 miles (100,000 km). Following the withdrawal of Commonwealth ships from the anti-infiltration patrols, the RNZN crew took her back to England, where she paid off in reserve at Portsmouth.

=== Argentina ===
The ship was sold to Argentina in 1967 and renamed Neuquen (M1), raising the new ensign at Southampton on 13 September 1968. She reached Argentina in November and was formally commissioned on 23 December 1968. She was allocated to the mining and minesweeping division headquartered at the Puerto Belgrano Naval Base and was active until at least 1972.

She was decommissioned in 1996 and sold. Her bridge structure is preserved at the naval museum at Puerto Belgrano.

== See also ==
- Minesweepers of the Royal New Zealand Navy
