= HMNZS Santon =

History

United Kingdom
- Name: Santon
- Builder: Fleetlands Shipyards, Portsmouth
- Launched: 18 August 1955
- Identification: Pennant number: M1156

New Zealand
- Name: Santon
- Commissioned: 10 April 1965
- Decommissioned: November 1966
- Identification: Pennant number: M1156

Argentina
- Name: Chubut
- Acquired: 1967
- Identification: Pennant number: M3

General characteristics
- Class & type: Ton-class minesweeper
- Displacement: 440 long tons (450 t)
- Length: 153 ft (46.6 m)
- Beam: 28.9 ft (8.8 m)
- Draught: 8.2 ft (2.5 m)
- Propulsion: 2 × Paxman Deltic 18A-7A diesel engines at 3,000 bhp (2,200 kW)
- Speed: Cruise 13 knots (24 km/h) on one engine. Max 16 knots (30 km/h) on both
- Range: 2,500 nautical miles (4,600 km) at 12 knots (22 km/h)
- Complement: 32
- Armament: 1 x Bofors 40 mm gun; 2 × 20 mm (2×1) – increased for NZ service

HMNZS Santon (M1178) was a Ton-class minesweeper that operated in the Royal Navy, the Royal New Zealand Navy (RNZN), and the Argentine Navy. Built for the Royal Navy by Fleetlands Shipyard of Portsmouth, the minesweeper was launched on 18 August 1955 and commissioned as HMS Santon. She was named after a small village in North Lincolnshire. The minesweeper was commissioned in the RNZN from 1965 to 1966, when she was returned to the United Kingdom. She was later transferred to the Argentine Navy, and operated as ARA Chubut (M3).

== Construction ==
Santon was built for the Royal Navy by Fleetlands Shipyards of Portsmouth. The minesweeper was launched on 18 August 1955.

== Operational history ==
=== New Zealand ===
Early in 1965, Indonesia was employing a policy of confrontation against Malaysia. New Zealand agreed to assist Malaysia by deploying two Royal Navy minesweepers then in reserve at Singapore. These were commissioned into the RNZN on 10 April 1965 and joined the Royal Navy's 11th Minesweeping squadron (also Ton class), taking part in anti-infiltration patrols in Malaysian waters. Lieutenant Lincoln Tempero, later Chief of Naval Staff, was appointed Commanding Officer.

In her first year Santon, together with her sister ship Hickleton, carried out 200 patrols, with 20 incidents involving intruding Indonesians, often taking as prisoners those aboard the intercepted craft.

In April 1966, Santon assisted in the rescue of the crew of the wrecked Panamanian freighter Carina. By the time the Indonesian confrontation policy ended in August 1966, Santon had steamed 67,400 miles (108,500 km). Following the withdrawal of Commonwealth ships from the anti-infiltration patrols, the RNZN crew took her back to England, where she paid off in reserve at Portsmouth in November 1966.

=== Argentina ===
The ship was subsequently sold to Argentina and renamed Chubut (M3). She was decommissioned in 1997.

== See also ==
- Minesweepers of the Royal New Zealand Navy
