= Taupō (disambiguation) =

Taupō is a town in the centre of the North Island of New Zealand.

Taupō or Taupo may also refer to:

== New Zealand ==
- Lake Taupō, the lake that the town of Taupō sits on
- Taupō Bay, a bay on New Zealand's coast, located in Northland
- Taupō Volcano, a volcano in the centre of New Zealand's North Island
- Taupō Caldera, a caldera formed by Taupō Volcano
- Taupō Airport, a small airport South of the town of Taupō
- Taupō District, a District, or territorial authority, of New Zealand
- Taupō (electorate), a New Zealand parliamentary electorate division
- Taupō Swamp, in Plimmerton, New Zealand
- HMNZS Taupo, a New Zealand Navy vessel

== See also ==
- Taupoa, an archaic classification for the Epeus spider
- Taupe, a dark brown color
