= HMNZS Pukaki =

HMNZS Pukaki is a name which has been used by three ships of the Royal New Zealand Navy:

- HMNZS Pukaki (F424), was a frigate, 1948–66
- HMNZS Pukaki (1975), was a Lake-class patrol vessel, 1975–91, pennant number P3568
- HMNZS Pukaki (2008), is a Protector-class inshore patrol vessel, launched in 2008, pennant number P3568
