= HMNZS Hawea (2007) =

Ship built in 2007

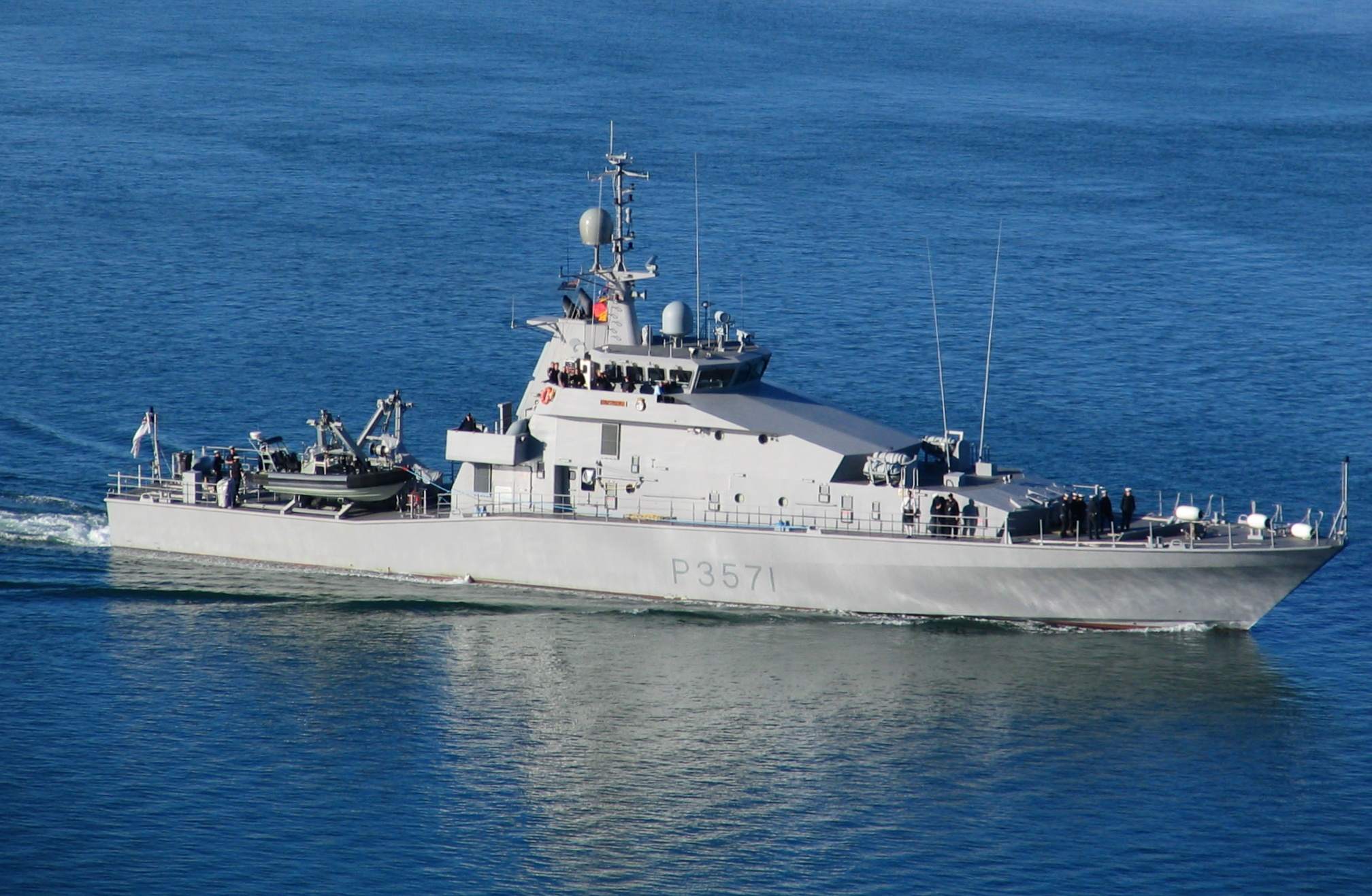
- HMNZS Hawea entering Otago Harbour in 2009

History

New Zealand
- Name: HMNZS Hawea
- Namesake: Lake Hāwea
- Builder: Tenix Defence, Whangārei
- Cost: NZ$ 35.7 million (2004)
- Launched: 11 December 2007
- Christened: 15 December 2007
- Commissioned: 1 May 2009
- Identification: Pennant number: P3571; IMO number: 9368508; MMSI number: 512156000; Callsign: ZMZO
- Motto: Kia Toa (Be Brave)
- Status: Laid up as of 2022

General characteristics
- Class & type: Lake-class inshore patrol vessel
- Displacement: 340 t (335 long tons) loaded
- Length: 55 m (180 ft 5 in)
- Beam: 9 m (29 ft 6 in)
- Draught: 2.9 m (9 ft 6 in)
- Propulsion: 2 × MAN B&W 12VP185 engines rated at 2,500 kW at 1,907 rpm; ZF 7640 NR gearboxes; 2 controllable pitch propellers
- Speed: Baseline speed 25 knots (46 km/h); Economical speed 12 knots (22 km/h); Loiter speed 4-7 knots
- Range: 3,000 nmi (5,600 km)
- Complement: 20 (+2) Navy, 4 Govt. agency officers, 12 additional personnel
- Armament: 3 × 12.7 mm machine guns, mounted forward and two either side of the funnel; Small arms

HMNZS Hawea is a Lake-class inshore patrol vessel of the Royal New Zealand Navy. Hawea was constructed between 2004 and 2007, and commissioned on 1 May 2009. She performs border and fisheries protection patrols. Hawea is the third ship of this name to serve in the Royal New Zealand Navy and is named after Lake Hāwea.

The Royal New Zealand Navy had originally four Lake-class vessels. Two of the Lake-class vessels were sold to the Irish Naval Service in 2022, being delivered in May 2023. They were commissioned into service in 2024 after commission works were completed. Both are based on the east coast of Ireland where sea conditions suit their capabilities.

Hawea was laid up in late 2022 due to staff shortages in the RNZN.

Hawea was not one of the vessels sold to Ireland, and as of 2025, Hawea remains in service with the Royal New Zealand Navy.

== See also ==
- Patrol boats of the Royal New Zealand Navy
