= HMNZS Rotoiti (1975) =

Ship built in 1975

History

New Zealand
- Builder: Brooke Marine, Britain
- Commissioned: 1975
- Decommissioned: 1991
- Identification: Pennant number: P3569
- Fate: Deleted

General characteristics
- Class & type: Lake-class patrol vessel
- Displacement: 105 tons standard 135 tons full load
- Length: 107.8 ft (32.9 m)
- Beam: 20 ft (6.1 m)
- Draught: 11.1 ft (3.4 m)
- Propulsion: 2 × Paxman 12Y JCM diesels 3000 hp, 2 shafts
- Speed: 25 knots (46 km/h; 29 mph)
- Range: 3,000 nmi (5,600 km; 3,500 mi)
- Complement: 21
- Sensors & processing systems: Navigation radar: Racal Decca 916 I band
- Armament: 2 × 12.7mm machine guns 1 × 81mm mortar

HMNZS Rotoiti was a Lake-class patrol vessel of the Royal New Zealand Navy. It was commissioned in 1975 and deleted in 1991.

Rotoiti was one of three ships of this name to serve in the Royal New Zealand Navy and is named after either Lake Rotoiti in North Island, or Lake Rototi in South Island (or perhaps both).

== See also ==
- Patrol boats of the Royal New Zealand Navy
