= HMNZS Pukaki (1975) =

History

New Zealand
- Builder: Brooke Marine, Britain
- Commissioned: 1975
- Decommissioned: 1991
- Identification: Pennant number: P3568
- Fate: Sold to private ownership

General characteristics
- Class & type: Lake-class inshore patrol vessel
- Displacement: 105 tons standard 135 tons full load
- Length: 107.8 ft (32.9 m)
- Beam: 20 ft (6.1 m)
- Draught: 11.1 ft (3.4 m)
- Propulsion: 2 × Paxman 12Y JCM diesels 3000 hp, 2 shafts
- Speed: 25 knots (46 km/h; 29 mph)
- Range: 3,000 nmi (5,600 km; 3,500 mi)
- Complement: 21
- Sensors & processing systems: Navigation radar: Racal Decca 916 I Band
- Armament: 2 × 12.7mm machine guns; 1 × 81mm mortar

HMNZS Pukaki was a Lake-class inshore patrol vessel of the Royal New Zealand Navy. Pukaki commissioned in 1975, deleted in 1991 and sold as a private launch.

== Service history ==
The class was intended to comprise 6 vessels to replace the wartime harbour protection boats and old converted minesweepers HMNZS Kiama and Inverell used for fishery protection in the 1960s and early 1970s. The Lake class were politically justified as a means of enhancing New Zealand's capability for patrolling the 200-nautical-mile (370 km) exclusive economic zone, established by the new Law of the Sea of 1977. However they were too small for the task, and gave the crews a roller-coaster ride, resulting in extensive injury and sea sickness. Originally the RNZN had requested slightly larger 37-metre (121 ft) boats from Brooke Marine, but the experience of the over-extended Lake class turned the navy strongly against this type of mini warship. Opposition politicians condemned their introduction as ridiculously expensive and militaristic for fisheries protection. On calm days and in protected waters they could be comfortable and they gave useful early command experience for officers. Pukaki and its class were used to escort the US Navy nuclear submarines Haddo and Pintado into Auckland Harbour in 1978 and 1979 .

Pukaki was one of three ships of this name to serve in the Royal New Zealand Navy and is named after Lake Pukaki.

== See also ==
- Patrol boats of the Royal New Zealand Navy
