= HMNZS Hawea (1975) =

History

New Zealand
- Builder: Brooke Marine, Britain
- Commissioned: 1975
- Decommissioned: 1991
- Identification: Pennant number: P3571

General characteristics
- Class & type: Lake-class inshore patrol vessel
- Displacement: 105 tons standard; 135 tons full load
- Length: 107.8 ft (32.9 m)
- Beam: 20 ft (6.1 m)
- Draught: 11.1 ft (3.4 m)
- Propulsion: 2 × Paxman 12Y JCM diesels, 3,000 hp, 2 shafts
- Speed: 25 knots (46 km/h; 29 mph)
- Range: 3,000 nautical miles (5,600 km; 3,500 mi)
- Complement: 21
- Sensors & processing systems: Navigation radar: Racal Decca 916 I Band
- Armament: 2 × 12.7mm machine guns; 1 × 81mm mortar

HMNZS Hawea was a Lake-class inshore patrol vessel of the Royal New Zealand Navy. It was commissioned in 1975 and decommissioned in 1991.

Hawea was one of three ships of this name to serve in the Royal New Zealand Navy and is named after Lake Hāwea.

After 1991 decommissioning the ship was sold into Australia (also in 1991) and was last seen as a civilian work boat in Queensland.

== See also ==
- Patrol boats of the Royal New Zealand Navy
