= Lake-class patrol vessel =

Class overview
- Name: Lake-class patrol boat
- Builders: Brooke Marine, Britain
- Operators: Royal New Zealand Navy
- In service: 1975 - 1991
- Completed: 4
- Active: none

General characteristics
- Type: Patrol vessel
- Displacement: 105 tons standard, 135 tons full load
- Length: 107.8 ft (32.9 m)
- Beam: 20 ft (6.1 m)
- Draught: 11.1 ft (3.4 m)
- Propulsion: 2 x Paxman 12Y JCM diesels 3,000 hp, 2 shafts
- Speed: 25 knots (46 km/h; 29 mph)
- Range: 3,000 nmi (5,600 km; 3,500 mi)
- Complement: 21
- Armament: 2 x 12.7mm machine guns 1 x 81mm mortar

The Lake-class patrol vessel was a class of patrol vessels built in 1974 for the Royal New Zealand Navy by the British boat builders Brooke Marine.

There were four boats in the class: (Note: The later Protector class inshore patrol vessels reused the same pennant numbers.)

- HMNZS Pukaki (P3568)
- HMNZS Rotoiti (P3569)
- HMNZS Taupo (P3570)
- HMNZS Hawea (P3571)

All the boats were commissioned in 1975 and decommissioned in 1991

== See also ==
- Patrol boats of the Royal New Zealand Navy
