= Royal New Zealand Navy =

Maritime arm of the New Zealand Defence Force

- Te Taua Moana o Aotearoa (Māori)
- Badge of the Royal New Zealand Navy; Royal New Zealand Navy Symbol
- Founded: 1 October 1941; 85 years ago
- Country: Dominion of New Zealand (1941–1947); New Zealand (1947–present)
- Type: Navy
- Role: Maritime security, Securing trade routes & the EEZ, Disaster relief, and Naval warfare etc.
- Size: 2,200 Active personnel; 684 Reserves; 8 Commissioned ships
- Part of: New Zealand Defence Force
- Garrison/HQ: Devonport Naval Base
- Colours: Red; White
- March: Quick – "Heart of Oak"; Slow – "E Pari Ra"
- Mascot: Anchor
- Anniversaries: 1 October 1941 (founded)
- Fleet: 2 Frigates; 2 Offshore patrol vessels; 2 Inshore patrol vessels; 1 Multi-role vessel; 1 Replenishment oiler
- Engagements: World War II; Korean War; Malayan Emergency; Indonesia–Malaysia confrontation; Solomon Islands; East Timor; Operation Enduring Freedom; Operation Prosperity Guardian
- Website: https://www.nzdf.mil.nz/navy/

Commanders
- Commander-in-Chief: Governor-General Cindy Kiro
- Chief of Defence Force: Air Marshal Tony Davies
- Chief of Navy: Rear Admiral Garin Golding
- Deputy Chief of Navy: Commodore Karl Woodhead

Insignia
- Naval ensign

- Naval jack

The Royal New Zealand Navy (RNZN; Māori: Te Taua Moana o Aotearoa, lit. 'the Sea War Party of New Zealand') is the maritime arm of the New Zealand Defence Force. The fleet currently consists of eight ships. The Navy had its origins in the Naval Defence Act 1913, and the subsequent acquisition of the cruiser HMS Philomel, which by 1921 had been moored in Auckland as a training ship. A slow buildup occurred during the interwar period, and then in December 1939, HMS Achilles fought alongside two other Royal Navy cruisers at the Battle of the River Plate against the German ship, Graf Spee.

== History ==
=== Pre–World War I ===
The first recorded maritime combat activity in New Zealand occurred off the northern tip of the South Island in December 1642. Māori in war canoes attacked and killed four seamen from Abel Tasman's party, who were at the time in low boats between the main ships.

The New Zealand Navy did not exist as a separate military force until 1941. The association of the Royal Navy with New Zealand began with the arrival of James Cook in 1769, who completed two subsequent journeys to New Zealand in 1773 and 1777. Occasional visits by Royal Navy ships were made from the late 18th century. The Royal Navy played a part in the New Zealand Wars: for example, a gunboat shelled fortified Māori pā from the Waikato River in order to defeat the Māori King Movement.

=== World War I and the inter-war period ===
In 1909 the New Zealand government decided to fund the purchase of the battlecruiser HMS New Zealand for the Royal Navy, which saw action throughout World War I in Europe. The passing of the Naval Defence Act 1913 created the New Zealand Naval Forces, still a part of the Royal Navy. The first ship given by the British government for the New Zealand Naval Forces was the cruiser HMS Philomel, which escorted New Zealand land forces to occupy the German colony of Samoa in 1914. Philomel saw further action under the command of the Royal Navy in the Mediterranean, the Red Sea, and the Persian Gulf. By 1917 she was worn out and was sent back to New Zealand where she served as a depot ship in Wellington Harbour for minesweepers. In 1921 she was transferred to Auckland for use as a training ship.

The New Zealand Naval Forces passed to the control of Commander-in-Chief, China, after the Royal Navy forces in Australia came under Canberra's control in 1911. From 1921 to 1941 the force was known as the New Zealand Division of the Royal Navy. The cruiser Chatham along with the sloop Veronica arrived in 1920, Philomel was transferred to the Division in 1921, as was the sloop Torch, HMS Laburnum arrived in 1922 and then HMS Dunedin in 1924. HMS Diomede and the minesweeper HMNZS Wakakura arrived in 1926. Between World War I and World War II, the New Zealand Division operated a total of 14 ships, including the cruisers HMNZS Achilles (joined 31 March 1937) and HMNZS Leander, which replaced Diomede and Dunedin (replaced by Leander in 1937).

=== World War II ===
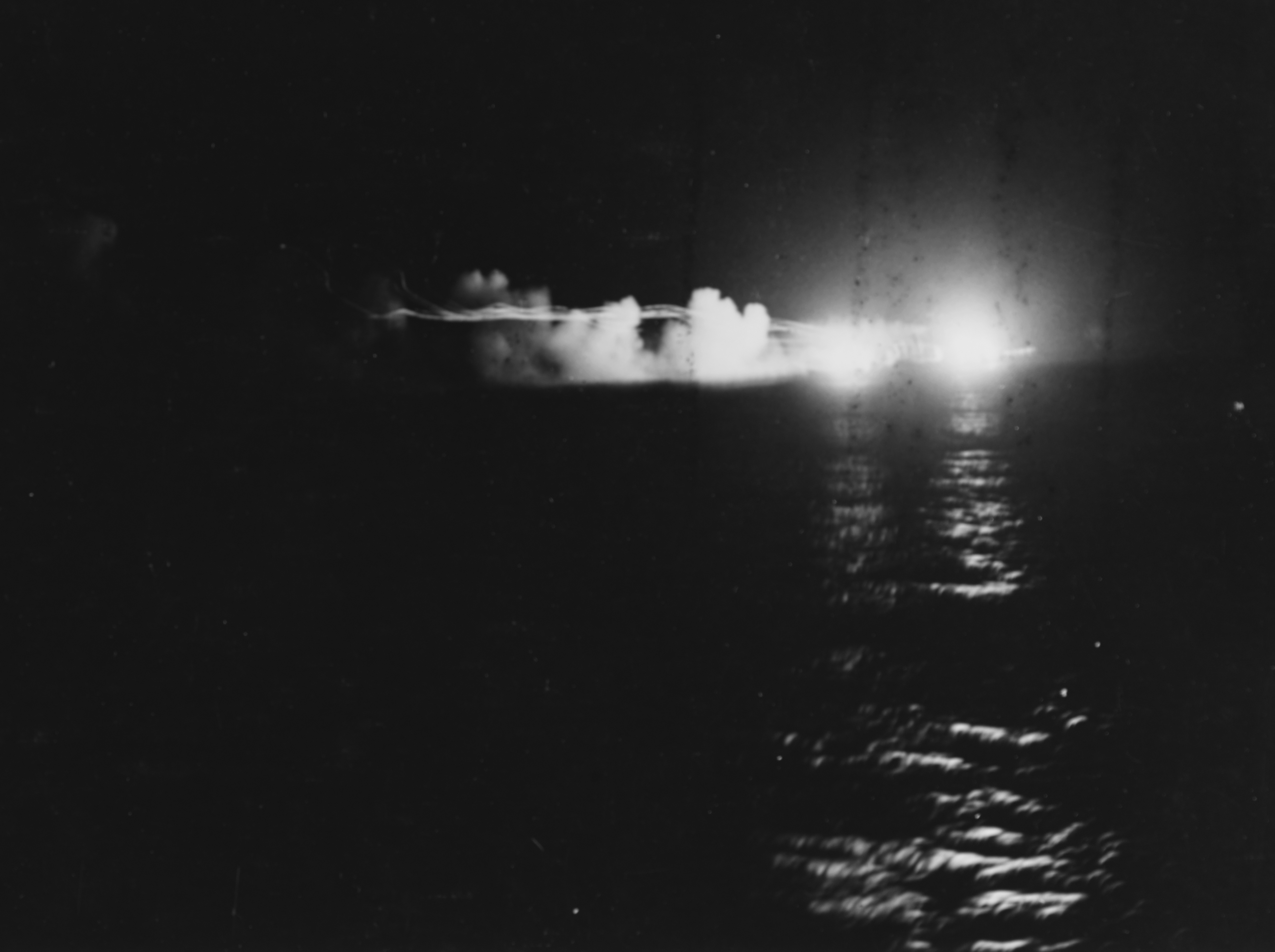
HMNZS Leander and USS St. Louis fire on Jintsu

When Britain went to war against Germany in 1939, New Zealand officially declared war at the same time, backdated to 9.30 pm on 3 September local time. But the gathering in Parliament in Carl Berendsen's room (including Peter Fraser) could not follow Chamberlain's words because of static on the shortwave and waited until the Admiralty notified the fleet that war had broken out before Cabinet approved the declaration of war (the official telegram from Britain was delayed and arrived just before midnight).

HMS Achilles participated in the first major naval battle of World War II, the Battle of the River Plate off the River Plate estuary between Argentina and Uruguay, in December 1939. Achilles and two other cruisers, HMS Ajax and HMS Exeter, severely damaged the German pocket battleship Admiral Graf Spee. The German Captain Hans Langsdorff then scuttled Graf Spee rather than face the loss of many more German seamen's lives.

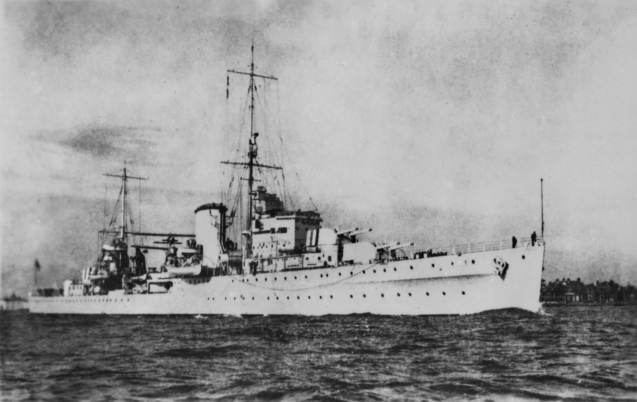
HMNZS Achilles

External videos
- HMNZS Kiwi and Moa versus submarine I-1: David versus Goliath at Sea – Drachinifel

Achilles moved to the Pacific, and was working with the United States Navy (USN) when damaged by a Japanese bomb off New Georgia. Following repair, she served alongside the British Pacific Fleet until the war's end.

The New Zealand Division of the Royal Navy became the Royal New Zealand Navy (RNZN) on 1 October 1941, in recognition of the fact that the naval force was now largely self-sufficient and independent of the Royal Navy. The Prime Minister Peter Fraser reluctantly agreed, though saying "now was not the time to break away from the old country". Ships thereafter were prefixed HMNZS (His/Her Majesty's New Zealand Ship).

HMNZS Leander escorted the New Zealand Expeditionary Force to the Middle East in 1940 and was then deployed in the Mediterranean, the Red Sea, and the Indian Ocean. Leander was subjected to air and naval attack from Axis forces, conducted bombardments, and escorted convoys. In February 1941, Leander sank the Italian auxiliary cruiser Ramb I in the Indian Ocean. In 1943, after serving further time in the Mediterranean, Leander returned to the Pacific Ocean. She assisted in the destruction of the Japanese cruiser Jintsu and was seriously damaged by torpedoes during the Battle of Kolombangara. The extent of the damage to Leander saw her docked for repairs until the end of the war.

As the war progressed, the size of the RNZN greatly increased, and by the end of the war, there were over 60 ships in commission. These ships participated as part of the British and Commonwealth effort against the Axis in Europe, and against the Japanese in the Pacific. They also played an important role in the defence of New Zealand, from German raiders, especially when the threat of invasion from Japan appeared imminent in 1942. Many merchant ships were requisitioned and armed for help in defence. One of these was HMNZS Monowai, which saw action against the Japanese submarine I-20 off Fiji in 1942. In 1941–1942, it was decided in an agreement between the New Zealand and United States governments that the best role for the RNZN in the Pacific was as part of the United States Navy, so operational control of the RNZN was transferred to the South West Pacific Area command, and its ships joined United States 7th Fleet taskforces.

In 1943, the light cruiser HMS Gambia was transferred to the RNZN as HMNZS Gambia. In November 1944, the British Pacific Fleet, a joint British Commonwealth military formation, was formed, based in Sydney, Australia. Most RNZN ships, including Gambia and Achilles, were transferred to the BPF. They took part in the Battle of Okinawa and operations in the Sakishima Islands, near Japan. In August 1945, HMNZS Gambia was New Zealand's representative at the surrender of Japan.

=== Post-World War II ===
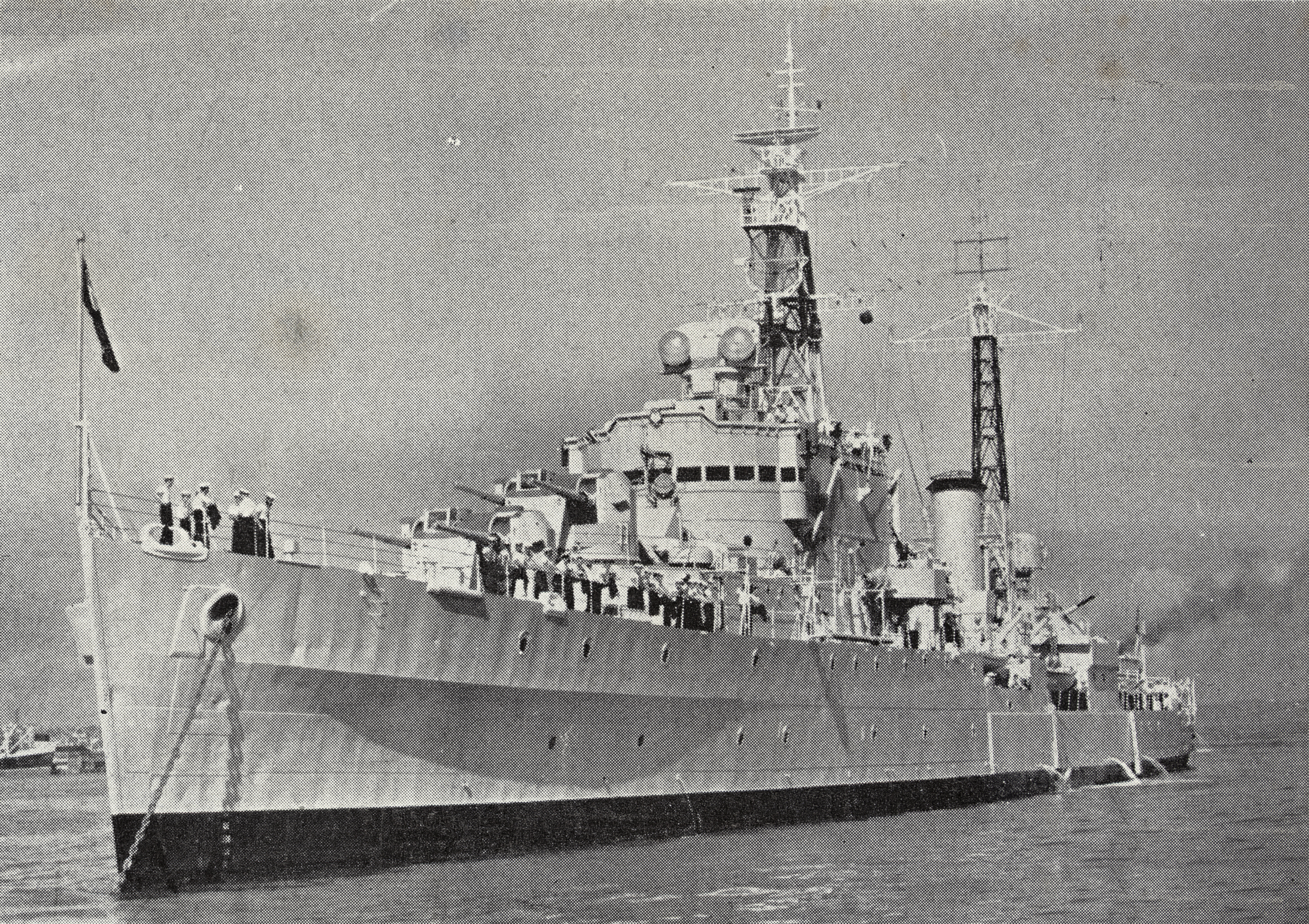
HMS Royalist (89) in Waitemata Harbour, 1956

During April 1947 a series of non-violent mutinies occurred amongst the sailors and non-commissioned officers of four RNZN ships and two shore bases. Overall, up to 20% of the sailors in the RNZN were involved in the mutinies. The resulting manpower shortage forced the RNZN to remove the light cruiser Black Prince, one of their most powerful warships, from service and set the navy's development and expansion back by a decade. Despite this impact, the size and scope of the events have been downplayed over time.

RNZN ships participated in the Korean War. On 29 June, just four days after 135,000 North Korean troops crossed the 38th parallel in Korea, the New Zealand government ordered two Loch-class frigates – Tutira and Pukaki to prepare to make for Korean waters, and for the whole of the war, at least two NZ vessels would be on station in the theatre.

On 3 July these two first ships left Devonport Naval Base, Auckland and joined other Commonwealth forces at Sasebo, Japan, on 2 August. These vessels served under the command of a British flag officer (seemingly Flag Officer Second in Command Far East Fleet) and formed part of the US Navy screening force during the Battle of Inchon, performing shore raids and inland bombardment. Further RNZN Loch-class frigates joined these later – Rotoiti, Hawea, Taupo and Kaniere, as well as a number of smaller craft. Only one RNZN sailor was killed during the conflict – during the Inchon bombardments.

The Navy later participated in the Malayan Emergency. In 1954 a New Zealand frigate, HMNZS Pukaki, carried out a bombardment of a suspected guerilla camp, while operating with the Royal Navy's Far East Fleet – the first of a number of bombardments by RNZN ships over the next five years. Jack Welch, later to become Chief of Naval Staff decades later, wrote that in 1959, the RNZN "was still very much part of the Royal Navy supported by New Zealand tax-payers. The officer corps and senior specialist ratings were very dependent on loan and exchange RN personnel, while our own [New Zealand] officers and senior ratings were almost exclusively trained in the UK. We simply borrowed the RN's administrative regulations and amended them to local conditions. The Empire was alive and well. Operationally we were still very strongly tied to the UK."

Later the Navy return to Malayan waters during the Indonesia-Malaysia confrontation. These operations were the RNZN's last large-scale operation with the Royal Navy. In a security crisis and threat to Malaysia and Sarawak and Brunei, two-thirds of the Royal Navy's operational warships were deployed from 1963 to the end of 1966 with Royalist, Taranaki, and Otago, heavily involved in boarding ships, shore patrols, presence, maintaining the use of seaways and support of the RN's amphibious carriers. The commitment, wrote Welch, "involved the whole fleet, as ships rotated though Pearl Harbor for workup with the USN before deploying on to the Far East to relieve ships on station."

Until the 1960s the RNZN had, in common with other Dominion navies, flown the White Ensign as a common ensign. After 1945, the foreign policies of the now-independent states had become more distinctive. There was a growing wish and a need for separate identities, particularly if one Dominion was engaged in hostilities where another was not. Thus, in 1968, the RNZN adopted its own ensign, which retained the Union Flag in a top quarter but replaces the St George's Cross with the Southern Cross constellation that is displayed on the national flag.

Since 1946 the Navy has policed New Zealand's territorial waters and exclusive economic zone for fisheries protection. It also aids New Zealand's scientific activities in Antarctica, at Scott Base.

One of the best-known roles that the RNZN played on the world stage was when the frigates Canterbury and Otago were sent by the Labour Government of Norman Kirk to Moruroa Atoll in 1973 to protest against French nuclear testing there. The frigates were sent into the potential blast zone of the weapons, where both ships witnessed one airburst test each which forced France to then change to underground testing.

In May 1982 Prime Minister Rob Muldoon seconded the frigate Canterbury to the Royal Navy for the duration of the Falklands War. Canterbury was deployed to the Armilla Patrol in the Persian Gulf, to relieve a British frigate for duty in the South Atlantic. Canterbury was herself relieved by Waikato in August.

=== Post-Cold War ===
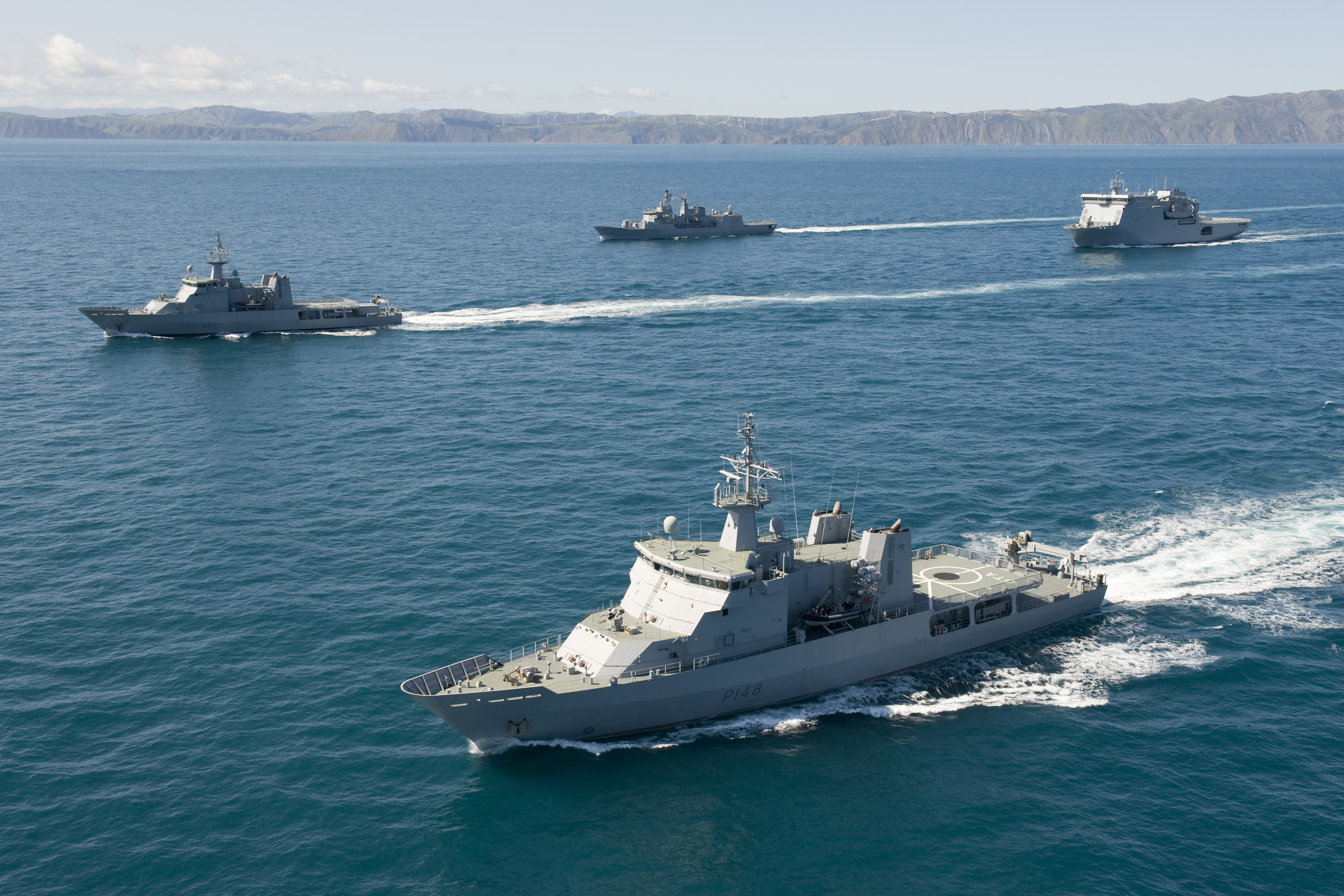
RNZN ships, Cook Strait, 2011

At the close of the Cold War the RNZN had an escort force of four frigates (HMNZS Waikato (F55), HMNZS Wellington (F69), HMNZS Canterbury (F421), and HMNZS Southland (F104)). Due to the cost of replacing four ships, the force was downsized to two. However, there was considerable political debate at times during the mid-1990s about whether a third and fourth Anzac-class frigate should be procured.

Since the 1990s, the RNZN has operated in the Middle East on numerous occasions. RNZN ships played a role in the Iran–Iraq War, aiding the Royal Navy in protecting neutral shipping in the Indian Ocean. Frigates were also sent to participate in the first Gulf War, and Operation Enduring Freedom. The RNZN has also played an important part in conflicts in the Pacific. Naval forces were utilised in the Bougainville, Solomon Islands and East Timor conflicts of the 1990s. The RNZN often participates in United Nations peacekeeping operations.

The hydrographic survey ship of the RNZN until 2012 was HMNZS Resolution, succeeding the long-serving HMNZS Monowai. Resolution was used to survey and chart the sea around New Zealand and the Pacific Islands. A small motor boat, SMB Adventure, was operated from Resolution. Resolution carried some of the most advanced survey technology available. HMNZS Resolution was decommissioned at Devonport Naval Base on 27 April 2012, and was replaced by HMNZS Manawanui (2019), which was commissioned on 7 June 2019.

In October 2021 the Defence Force contributed HMNZS Te Kaha to the UK Carrier Strike Group's transit through the South China Sea. This deployment sought to reiterate New Zealand's support for free international passage through the South China Sea, which has been claimed by China as part of its territorial waters. In June 2023, HMNZS Te Mana was confronted by two People's Liberation Army Navy frigates, helicopters, and four other vessels near the disputed Spratly Islands.

In late September 2024 Defence Minister Judith Collins confirmed that HMNZS Aotearoa had sailed through the disputed Taiwan Strait with HMAS Sydney. In response, a spokesperson for the Chinese Ministry of Foreign Affairs stated that China "handles foreign warships' transit through the Taiwan Strait in accordance with laws and regulations". On 29 September HMNZS Aotearoa took part in a joint maritime patrol with Australian, Filipino, Japanese and United States warships and aircraft in the disputed South China Sea, which has also been claimed by China.

On 5 October 2024 HMNZS Manawanui ran aground and sank off the coast of Siumu, on the south coast of Upolu island, Samoa, while surveying a nearby reef during a storm. HMNZS Manawanui became the first RNZN vessel to be unintentionally sunk since the Second World War and the first to be lost in peacetime. On 4 April 2025, a naval court of inquiry concluded that the warship sank due to a series of human errors and launched a disciplinary inquiry. On 19 January 2025, Judith Collins confirmed that Manawanui would not be replaced, with HMNZS Otago (P148) taking on the ships role, though lacking the working space and specialised equipment.

On 6 May 2025, Defence Minister Collins confirmed that the Government would allocate NZ$2 billion (US$1.2 billion) from its four-year NZ$12 billion defence funding allocation to purchasing new maritime helicopters for the Navy. On 21 August, Collins and Foreign Minister Winston Peters announced that the Government would purchase five new MH-60R Seahawks for the Navy.

White Ensign 1941–1968

White Ensign 1968–present

== Ships and aircraft ==
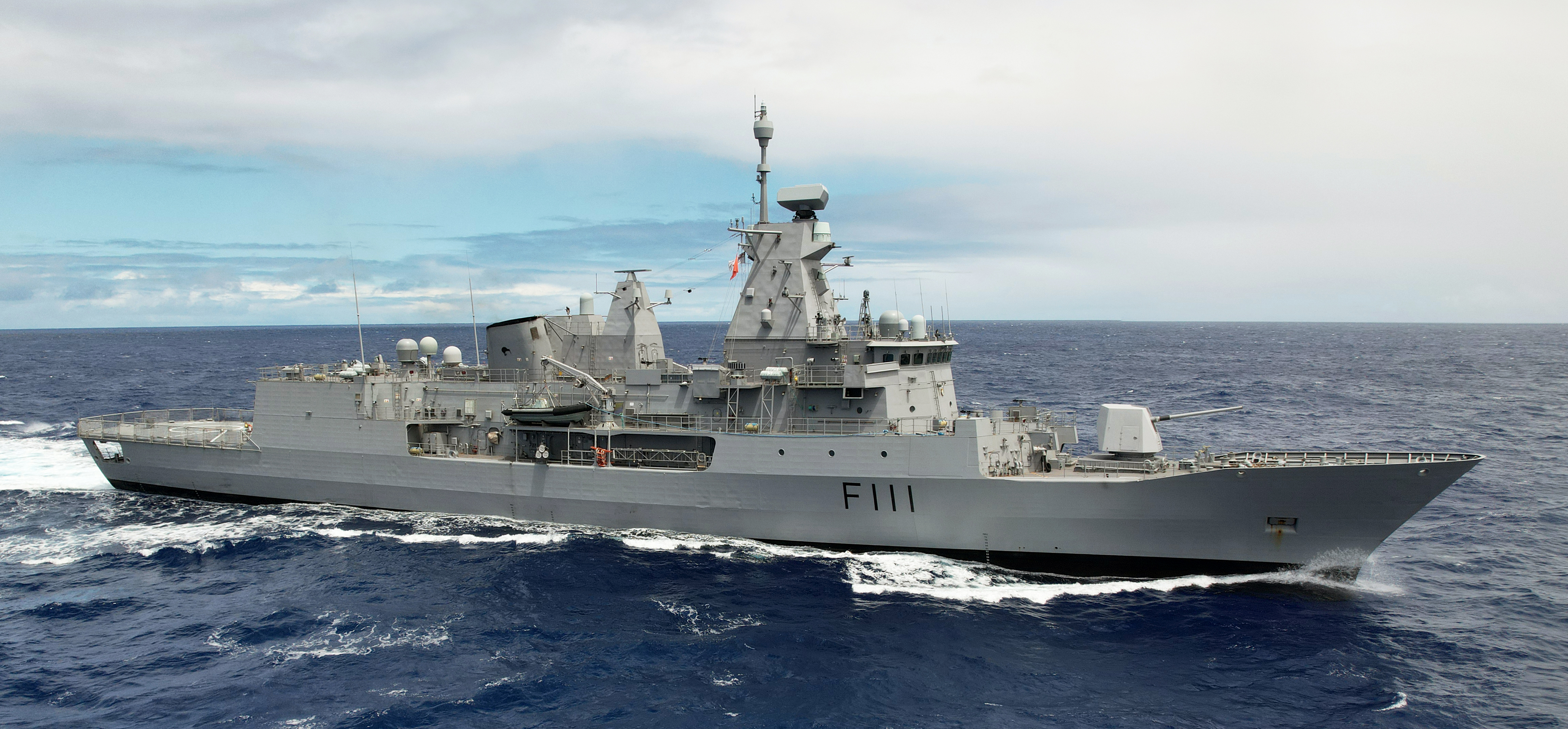
The Anzac-class frigate HMNZS Te Mana (F111).

=== Current ===
==== Naval Combat Force ====
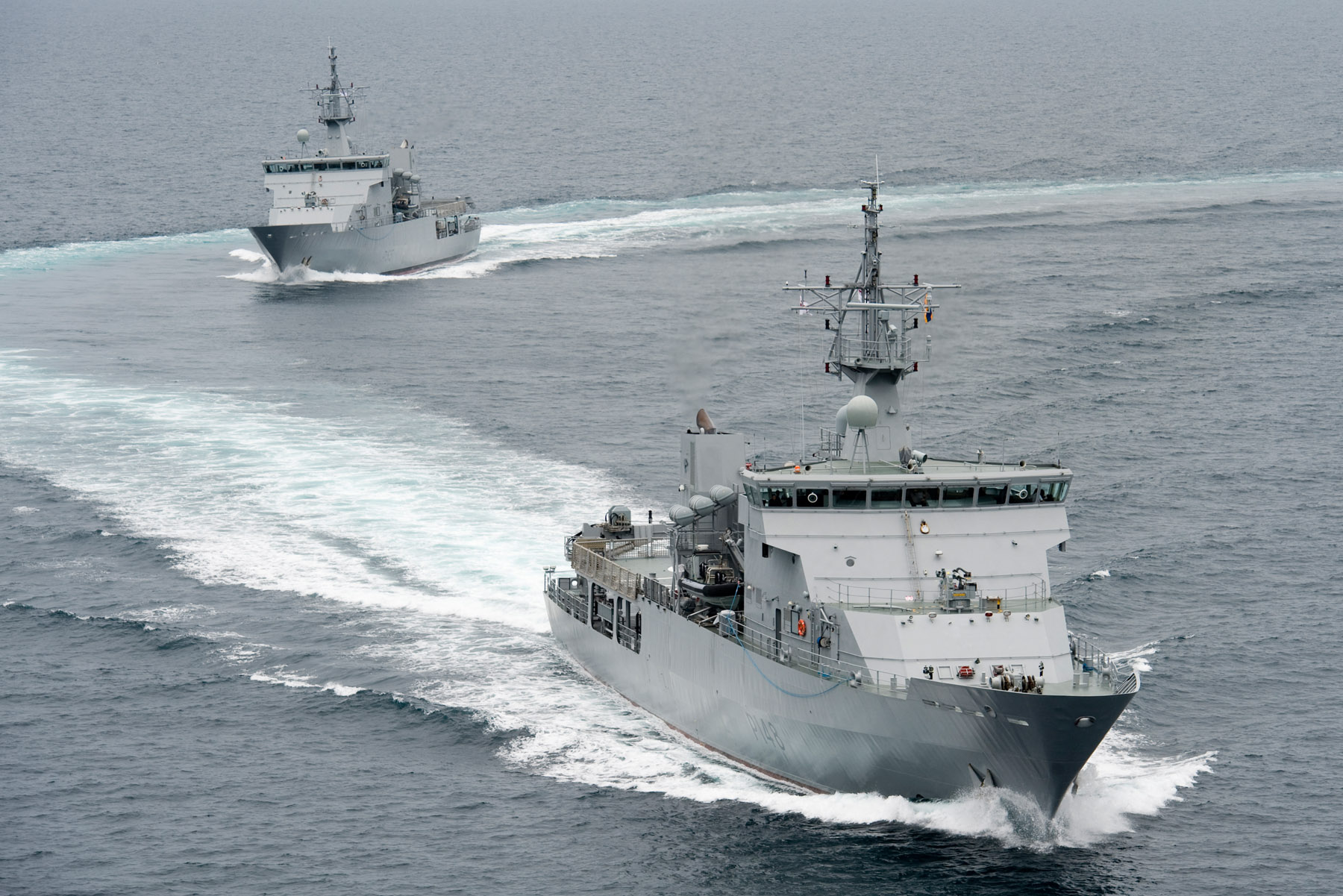
Both Protector-class offshore patrol vessels in 2010

The Combat Force consists of two Anzac-class frigates: HMNZS Te Kaha and HMNZS Te Mana. Two more frigates were planned, but were cancelled due to political pressure surrounding defence expenditure following the New Zealand breakup of military relations with ANZUS in 1986. HMNZS Te Kaha was commissioned on 26 July 1997 and HMNZS Te Mana on 10 December 1999. Both ships completed the frigate systems upgrade in 2020 and 2022 respectively.

- HMNZS Te Kaha
- HMNZS Te Mana

==== Naval Patrol Force ====
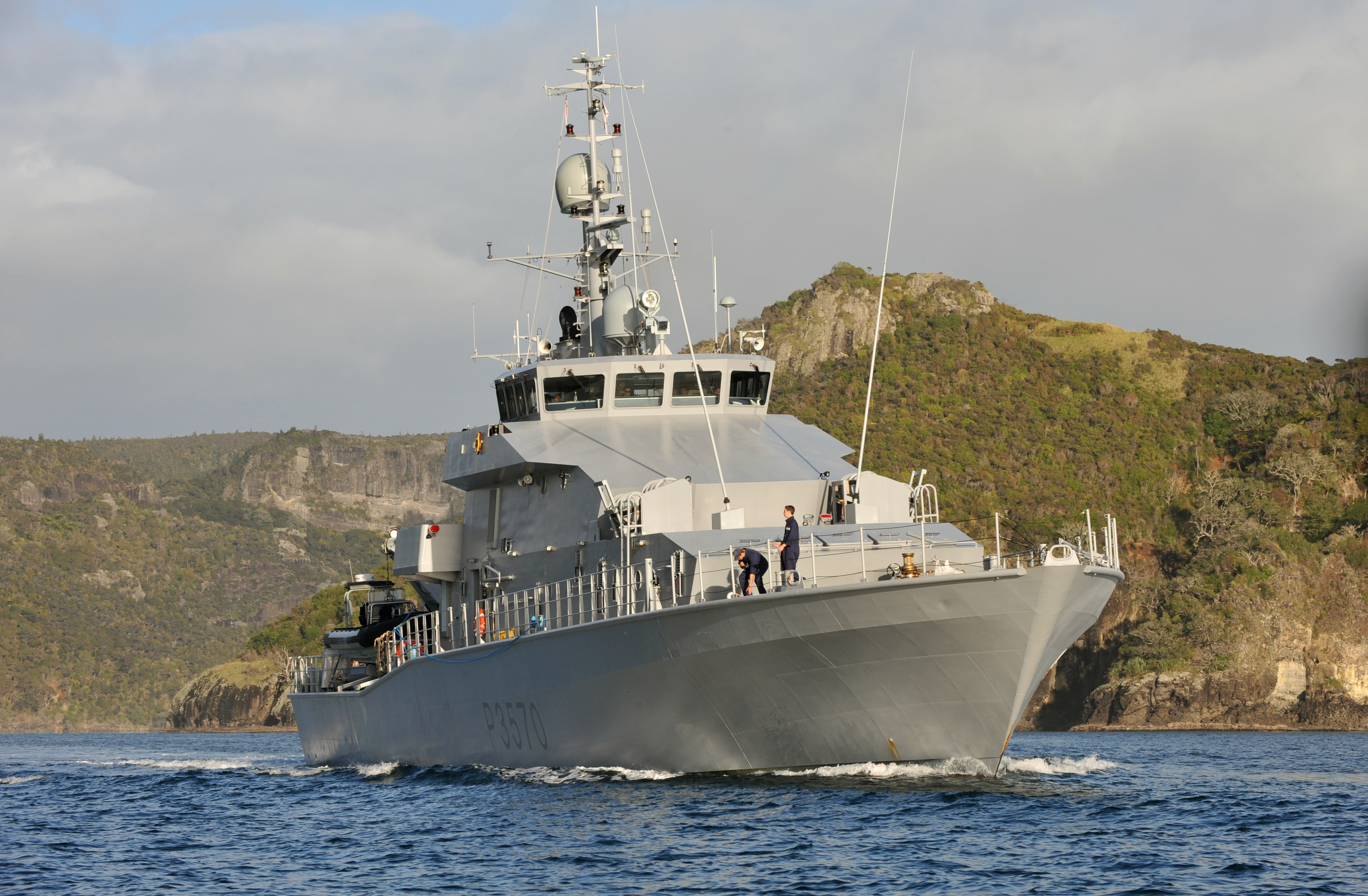
Inshore patrol vessel HMNZS Taupo (P3570).

The Patrol Force consists of two offshore patrol vessels (OPVs) and two inshore patrol vessels (IPVs). The Patrol Force is responsible for policing New Zealand's Exclusive Economic Zone, one of the largest in the world. In addition, the Patrol Force provides assistance to a range of civilian government agencies, including the Department of Conservation, New Zealand Customs and Police, Ministry of Fisheries and others. Originally two OPVs and four IPVs were acquired under Project Protector, but two of the four IPVs were sold to Ireland in 2022. The Patrol Force in 2025 consists of:

- 2 Protector-class offshore patrol vessels (HMNZS Otago and HMNZS Wellington)
- 2 Lake-class inshore patrol vessels (HMNZS Taupo and HMNZS Hawea)

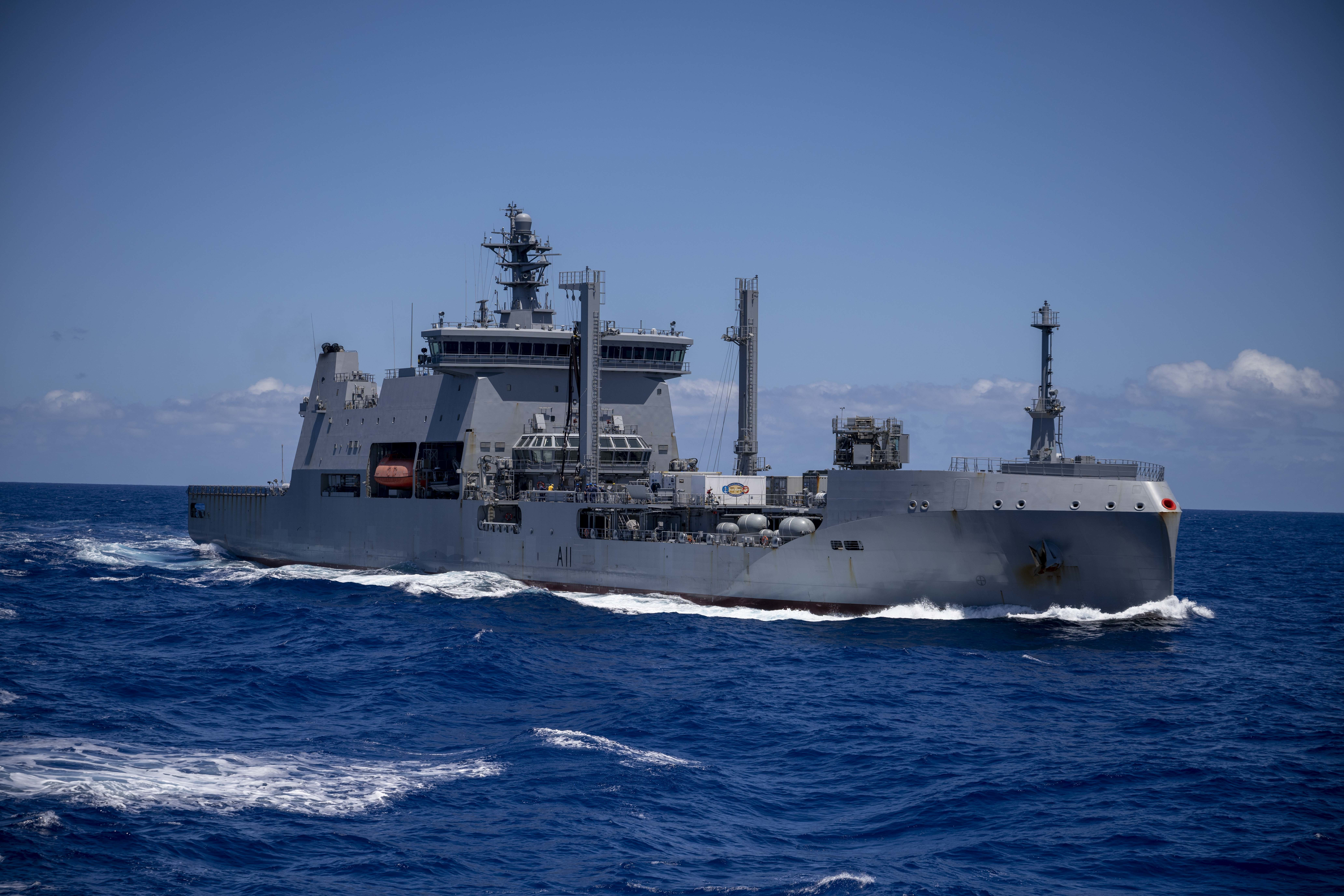
Replenishment ship HMNZS Aotearoa.

==== Naval Support Force ====
- HMNZS Canterbury, a multi-role vessel that entered service in June 2007.
- HMNZS Aotearoa, a replenishment oiler commissioned in 2020.

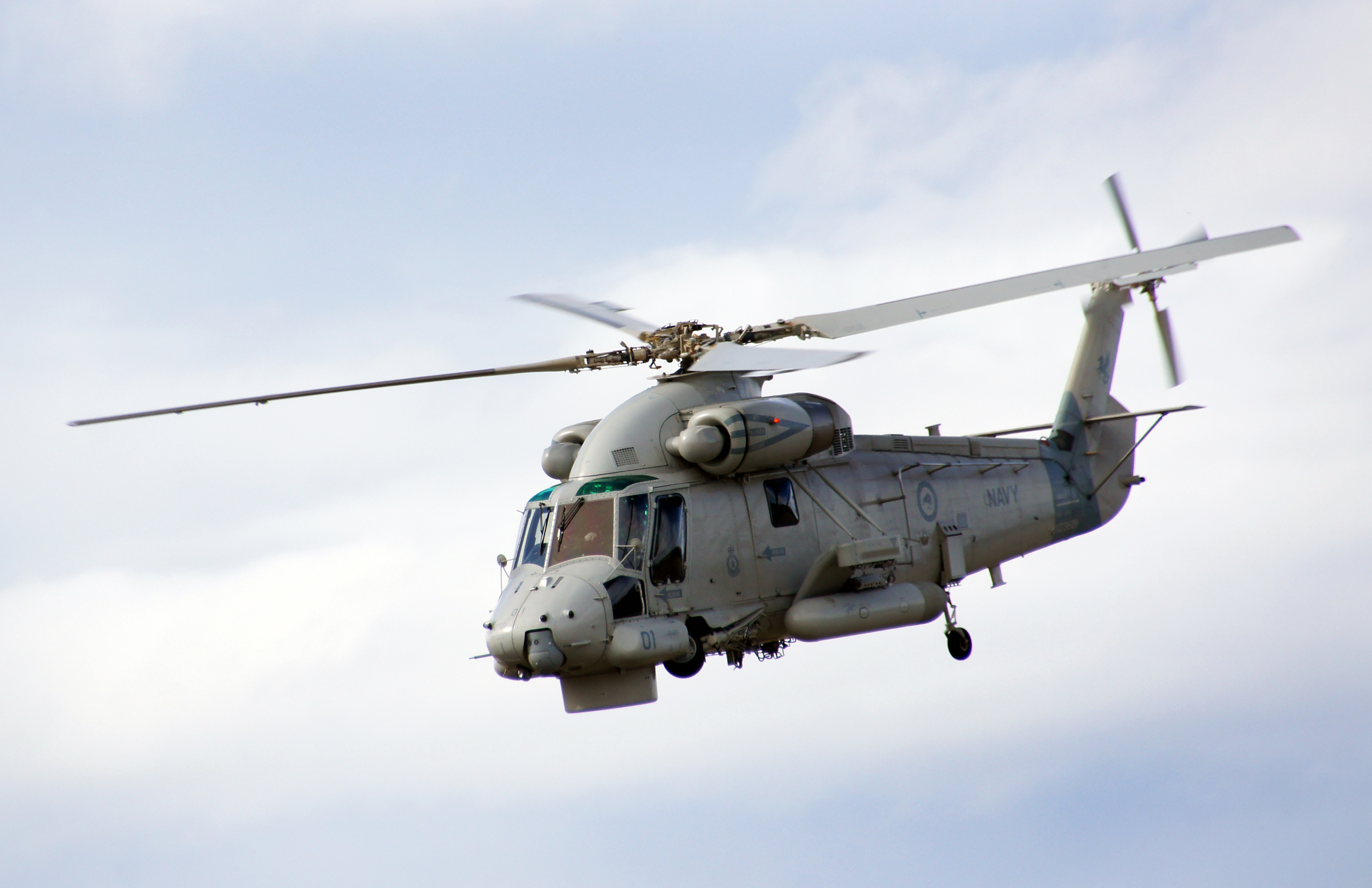
RNZN SH-2G(I) Super Seasprite helicopter.

==== Littoral Warfare Support Force ====
The Littoral Warfare Support Force consisted of HMNZS Manawanui, a dive and hydrographic vessel commissioned in 2019, which sank off the coast of Samoa on 6 October 2024, and HMNZS Matataua.

===== Hydrographic survey and clearance diving =====
HMNZS Matataua was a land-based unit (a stone frigate) commissioned in 2017 (previously the Littoral Warfare Support Force, the Littoral Warfare Support Group, and most recently the Littoral Warfare Unit) with two operational groups, one for military hydrographic survey and the other clearance diving, and a logistics support group. Detachments from Matataua embarked on Manawanui when the ship was conducting survey and/or diving operations. Matataua was responsible for ensuring access to and the use of harbours, inshore waters and associated littoral zones through shallow water and coastal survey, mine-countermeasures and explosive ordnance disposal, beach survey and reconnaissance in support of amphibious operations, and underwater engineering. Matataua also provided underwater search and recovery support to the NZ Police, and other government and civil agencies as requested and approved through Headquarters Joint Forces New Zealand.

==== Aviation ====
The Royal New Zealand Air Force operates eight Kaman SH-2G(I) Super Seasprite helicopters. In August 2025 it was announced the Super Seasprites will be replaced by 5 MH-60 Seahawks. These aircraft are part of No. 6 Squadron RNZAF based at RNZAF Base Auckland. The aircraft are operated by RNZN aviators and are assigned to RNZN ships as required. The roles of the helicopters include:

- Surveillance
- Surface warfare
- Underwater warfare
- Helicopter delivery services/logistics
- Search and rescue
- Medical evacuation
- Training
- Assistance to other Government agencies

==== Non-commissioned vessels ====
A number of non-commissioned auxiliary vessels are used for a number of littoral, support and training purposes.

- Three Chico 40 sail training yachts (Manga II, Mako II, Paea II).
- Two Landing Craft Mechanised landing craft (LC01, LC02) - Used aboard HMNZS Canterbury.
- Three Littoral Manoeuvre Craft (Matawhā, Ururoa, and Mako).
- Two Surtees Workmate hydrographic and diving support launches (Pathfinder, Hammerhead).
- One VIP (Admiral's) Barge.
- Nine Zodiac Hurricane RHIBs.
- 26 Zodiac Milpro J3 RHIBs.

==== Unmanned vehicles ====
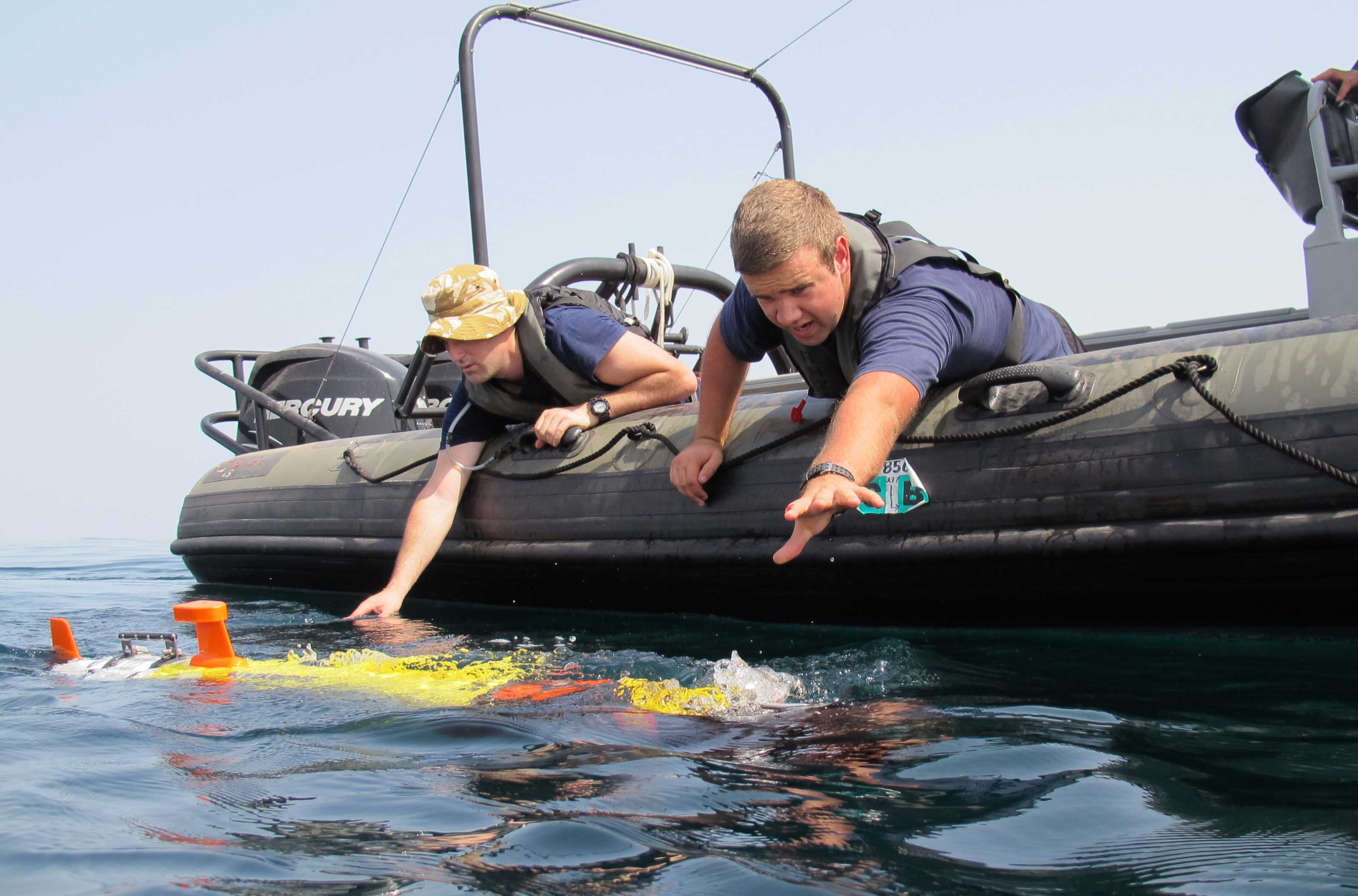
Members of the Royal New Zealand Navy's Military Hydrographic Group deploy an autonomous underwater vehicle, a REMUS 100, during an international military exercise.

The RNZN operates a small number of autonomous underwater vehicles, as well as, from late 2024, two 6.8m-long uncrewed surface vessels known as Bluebottles. The two vessels were christened Tahi and Rua.

Autonomous Underwater Vehicle	Quantity
REMUS 100	6
REMUS 300	4

The RNZN does not operate any ship-based unmanned aerial systems. However, according to a recent tender document, there exists some considerable scope for the acquisition of new systems.

== Role ==
=== Defence ===
In its Statement of Intent, the NZDF states its primary mission as:

"to secure New Zealand from external threat, to protect our sovereign interests, including in the Exclusive Economic Zone (EEZ) and to be able to take action to meet likely contingencies in our strategic area of interest."

The intermediate outcomes of the NZDF are listed as:

1. Secure New Zealand, including its people, land, territorial waters, exclusive economic zone, natural resources and critical infrastructure.
2. Reduced risks to New Zealand from regional and global insecurity.
3. New Zealand values and interests advanced through participation in regional and international security systems.
4. New Zealand is able to meet future national security challenges.

The role of the navy is to fulfil the maritime elements of the missions of the NZDF.

=== International participation ===
The RNZN has a role to help prevent any unrest occurring in New Zealand. This can be done by having a presence in overseas waters and assisting redevelopment in troubled countries. For example, any unrest in the Pacific Islands has the potential to affect New Zealand because of the large Pacific Island population. The stability of the South Pacific is considered in the interest of New Zealand. The navy has participated in peace-keeping and peace-making in East Timor, Bougainville and the Solomon Islands, supporting land-based operations.

=== Civilian roles ===
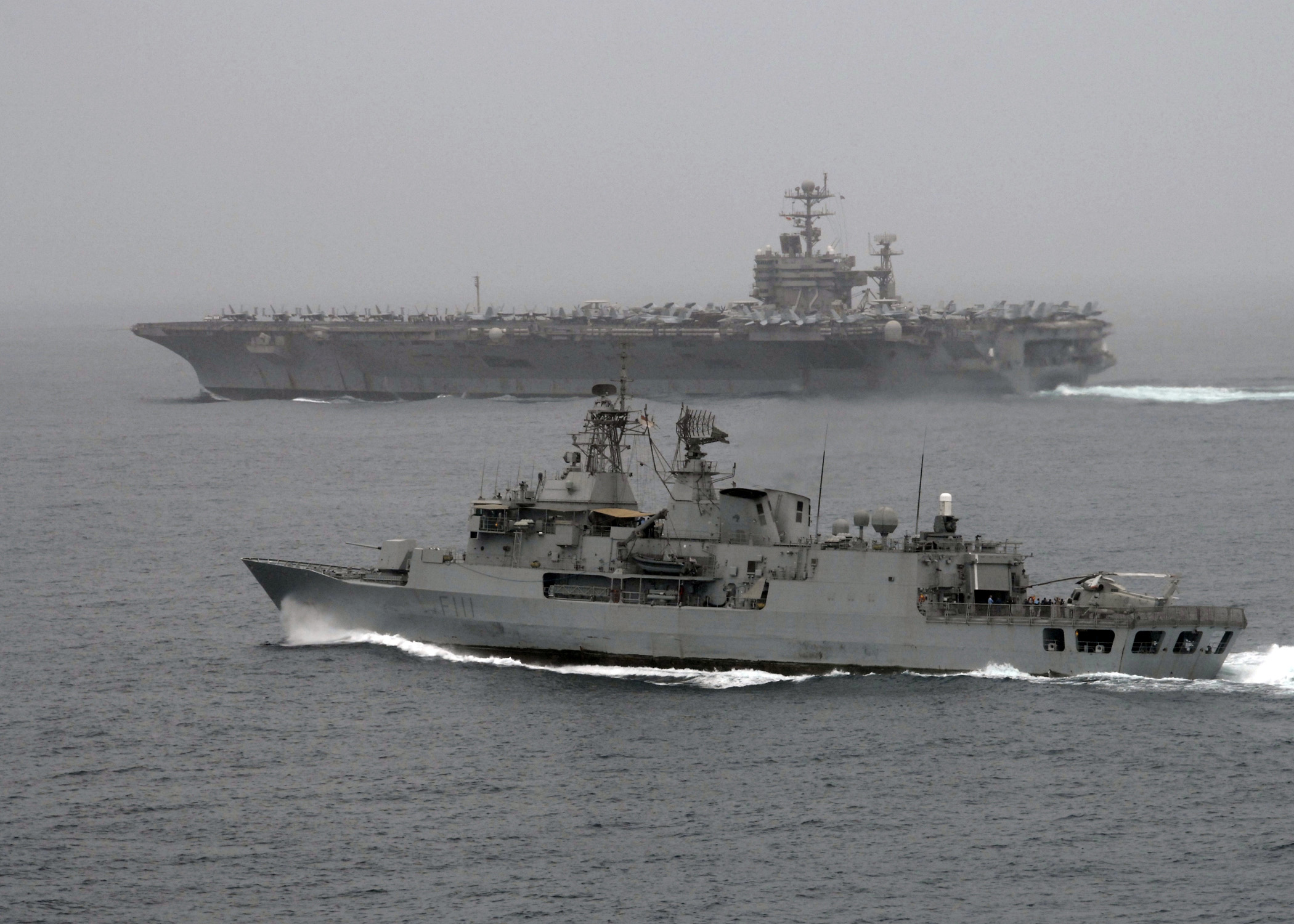
RNZN frigate HMNZS Te Mana and USS Abraham Lincoln in the North Arabian Sea during Operation Enduring Freedom

The 2002 Maritime Forces Review identified a number of roles that other government agencies required the RNZN to undertake. Approximately 1,400 days at sea are required to fulfil these roles annually.

Roles include patrolling the exclusive economic zone, transport to offshore islands, and support for the New Zealand Customs Service.

The RNZN formerly produced hydrographic information for Land Information New Zealand (LINZ) under a commercial contract arrangement. With the decommissioning of the dedicated hydrographic survey ship HMNZS Resolution, this has lapsed, and the Navy now focuses on military hydrography. Hydrospatial information is still provided to LINZ but on an ad-hoc basis.

=== Deployments ===
Following the September 11 attacks in 2001, the Royal New Zealand Navy contributed to the international campaign against Al-Qaeda and the Taliban under Operation Enduring Freedom. In November 2002 the New Zealand Government approved the deployment of an Anzac-class frigate and a P-3 Orion maritime patrol aircraft to the Operation Enduring Freedom Maritime Interdiction Operation.

HMNZS Te Kaha deployed to the Arabian Sea and Gulf of Oman in December 2002, operating with a Canadian-led multinational task group. Its duties included monitoring shipping, gathering intelligence, intercepting and boarding vessels of interest and, where necessary, identifying or detaining suspected Al-Qaeda and Taliban personnel. The ship also escorted coalition vessels through the Strait of Hormuz. Between 14 December 2002 and 25 February 2003, Te Kaha conducted 970 hails, 72 close inspections and 36 boardings, at one stage accounting for 42 per cent of the task group's boardings.

HMNZS Te Mana relieved Te Kaha in February 2003 and continued maritime interdiction operations until June. Te Mana returned to the Arabian Sea in 2004 for a further four-month maritime interdiction deployment in support of Operation Enduring Freedom. The naval deployments formed part of the wider New Zealand commitment known as Operation ARIKI, which also included personnel serving with coalition headquarters and the International Security Assistance Force in Afghanistan, as well as Royal New Zealand Air Force transport and maritime surveillance elements.

The RNZN subsequently maintained periodic deployments to the Middle East and northern Indian Ocean in support of multinational maritime-security operations. In 2008 Te Mana again deployed to the Persian Gulf, where it conducted maritime surveillance and patrol operations intended to protect commercial shipping and maritime infrastructure and to counter terrorism, piracy and the trafficking of drugs, weapons and people. From November 2013 into 2014, Te Mana deployed to the Gulf of Aden and Indian Ocean under Operation TIKI VI, supporting Combined Maritime Forces, European Union and NATO counter-piracy operations.

New Zealand has continued to contribute naval personnel and vessels to the Combined Maritime Forces in the Middle East. In 2025 Te Kaha deployed for six months to support Combined Task Force 150, which conducts maritime-security operations in the Arabian Sea and surrounding waters aimed at disrupting the movement of narcotics, weapons and other illicit cargo used to finance criminal and terrorist organisations. New Zealand has also supplied command and headquarters personnel to the Combined Maritime Forces, including command of Combined Task Force 150.

The RNZN routinely operates within New Zealand's primary maritime area of interest, extending from the Southwest Pacific through the Southern Ocean to Antarctica. New Zealand's maritime search-and-rescue area covers approximately 30 million square kilometres, or around seven per cent of the Earth's surface, and extends from the equator towards Antarctica. RNZN vessels undertake maritime surveillance, fisheries protection, search and rescue, border and resource-protection patrols, and support operations for other New Zealand government agencies.

Within the Pacific, the Navy regularly works with neighbouring states and regional organisations to combat illegal, unreported and unregulated fishing. RNZN ships have embarked fisheries and law-enforcement personnel from Pacific nations and conducted patrols of their exclusive economic zones at the request of local governments. These operations support organisations including the Pacific Islands Forum Fisheries Agency and are intended to improve maritime-domain awareness, deter illegal fishing and protect fisheries on which Pacific economies and communities depend.

Humanitarian assistance and disaster relief are also significant tasks for the RNZN in the Pacific. Following the 2022 Hunga Tonga–Hunga Ha'apai eruption and tsunami, HMNZS Canterbury, HMNZS Aotearoa and HMNZS Wellington were deployed as part of New Zealand's response. Canterbury delivered relief supplies including water pumps, food and other stores, while Aotearoa provided water and logistical support before continuing to Antarctica.

The Navy also contributes to New Zealand's responsibilities in the Southern Ocean and Antarctica. The offshore patrol vessels were designed for patrol, surveillance, search-and-rescue and support missions in New Zealand waters, the Southern Ocean and the Pacific. New Zealand also has international search-and-rescue responsibilities in the Ross Sea region and supports the protection of Antarctic marine resources. The polar-class sustainment vessel Aotearoa completed its first Antarctic resupply mission in 2022, becoming the first RNZN vessel in approximately 50 years able to berth at McMurdo Station.

Deployments outside New Zealand's immediate region are conducted in accordance with government direction and New Zealand's wider defence and foreign-policy objectives. These deployments have included multinational maritime-security, counter-terrorism and counter-piracy operations, support to freedom of navigation and sea lines of communication, exercises with partner navies, and contributions to regional and international security operations.

== Personnel ==
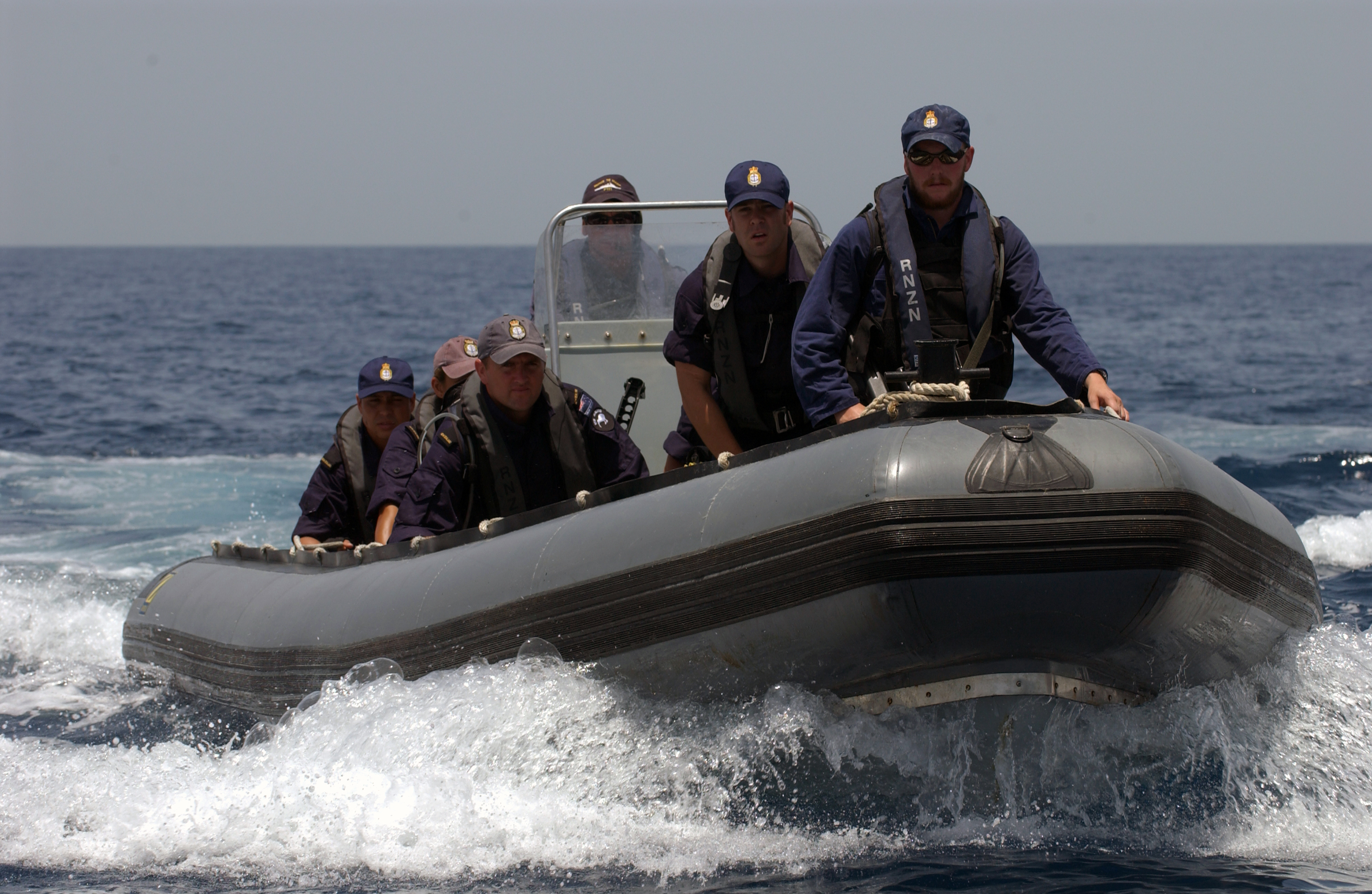
A boarding team from HMNZS Te Mana during the ship's deployment to the Gulf of Oman in 2004

As of 30 June 2022, the RNZN consisted of 2,219 Regular Force personnel and 611 Naval Reserve personnel.

=== Reserves ===
==== Naval Reserve ====
All regular force personnel on discharge from the RNZN are liable for service in the Royal New Zealand Naval Reserve. The Reserve has an active and inactive list. RNZN personnel can choose to serve four years in the Reserve on discharge.

==== Volunteer Reserve ====
The primary reserve component of the RNZN is the Royal New Zealand Naval Volunteer Reserve (RNZNVR), which is organised into four units based in Auckland (with a satellite unit at Tauranga), Wellington, Christchurch, and Dunedin:

- HMNZS Ngapona: Naval Reserve, Auckland
- HMNZS Olphert: Naval Reserve, Wellington
- HMNZS Pegasus: Naval Reserve, Christchurch
- HMNZS Toroa: Naval Reserve, Dunedin

At present, civilians can join the RNZNVR in one of three branches: Administration, Sea Service (for service on inshore patrol vessels), and Maritime Trade Organisation (formerly Naval Control of Shipping). In addition, ex-regular force personnel can now join the RNZNVR in their former branch and, depending on time out of the service, rank.

=== Training ===
Naval Ratings begin an 18-week basic training course (Basic Common Training (BCT)) prior to commencing their branch training (Basic Branch Training), which focuses on their chosen trade.

Naval Officers complete 22 weeks of training in three phases (Junior Officer Common Training (JOCT)) before commencing specialist training.

== Finance ==
=== Routine funding ===
The RNZN is funded through a "vote" of the Parliament of New Zealand. The New Zealand Defence Force funds personnel, operating and finance costs. Funding is then allocated to specific "Output Classes", which are aligned to policy objectives.

Funding allocation in each Output Class includes consumables, personnel, depreciation and a 'Capital Charge'. The Capital Charge is a budgetary mechanism to reflect the cost of Crown capital and was set at 7.5% for the 2009/2010 year.

=== Large projects ===
The Ministry of Defence is responsible for the acquisition of significant items of military equipment needed to meet New Zealand Defence Force capability requirements. Funding for the Ministry of Defence is appropriated separately.

== Shore establishments ==
=== Devonport Naval Base ===
The only RNZN naval base hosting ships.

=== The Navy Museum ===
The Navy Museum of the Royal New Zealand Navy is located at 64 King Edward Parade, Devonport, Auckland. It contains important collections of naval artefacts and extensive records.

== Uniforms and insignia ==
Uniforms of the RNZN are very similar to those of the British Royal Navy and other Commonwealth of Nations navies. However, RNZN personnel wear the nationality marker "NEW ZEALAND" on a curved shoulder flash on the service uniform and embroidered on shoulder slip-ons. Also, the RNZN uses the rank of Ensign as its lowest commissioned rank and five-pointed stars for Flag Officers.

=== Rank structure and insignia ===
==== Commissioned officer ranks ====
The rank insignia of commissioned officers.

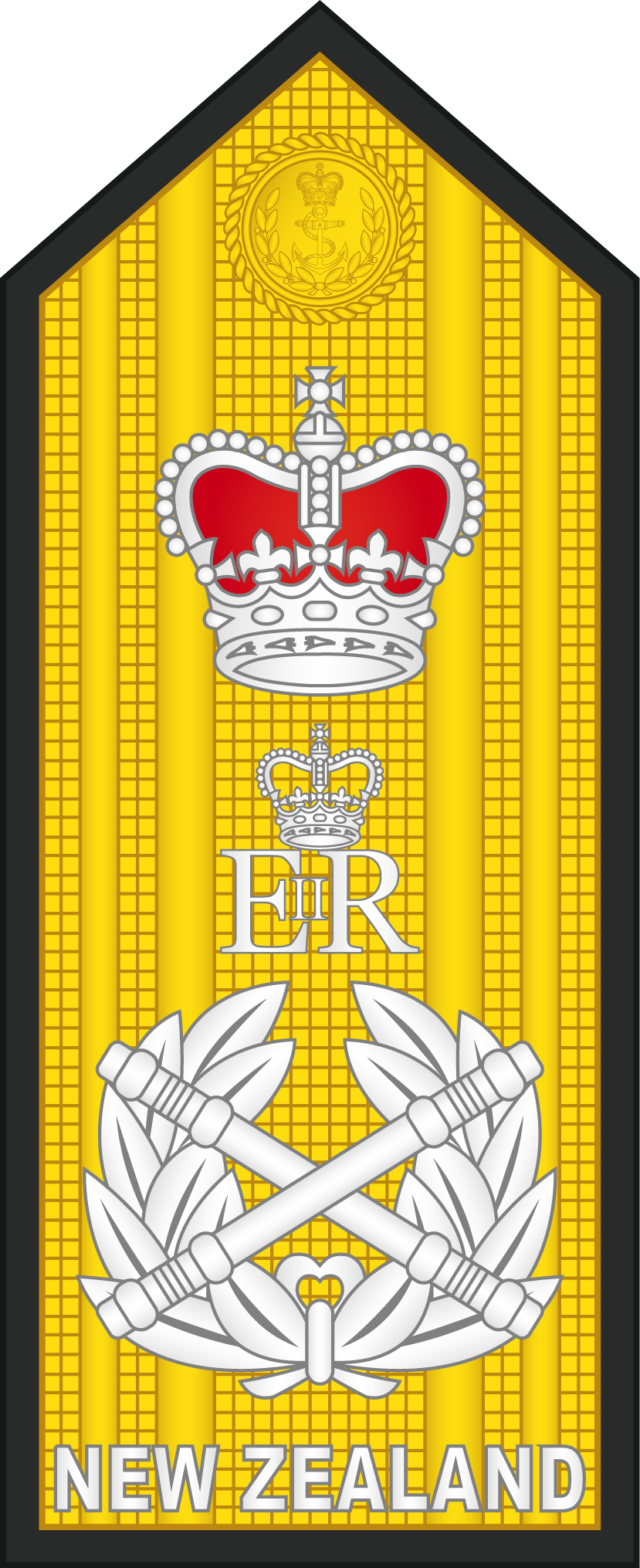
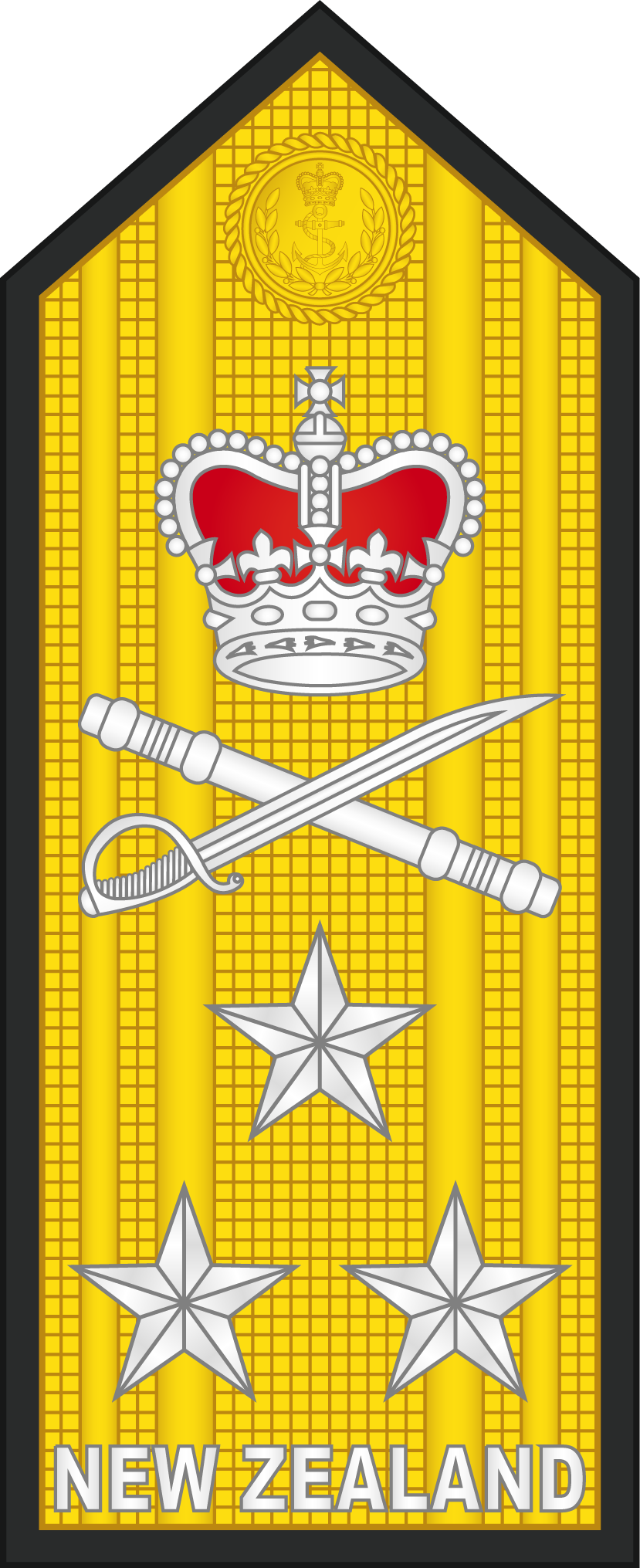
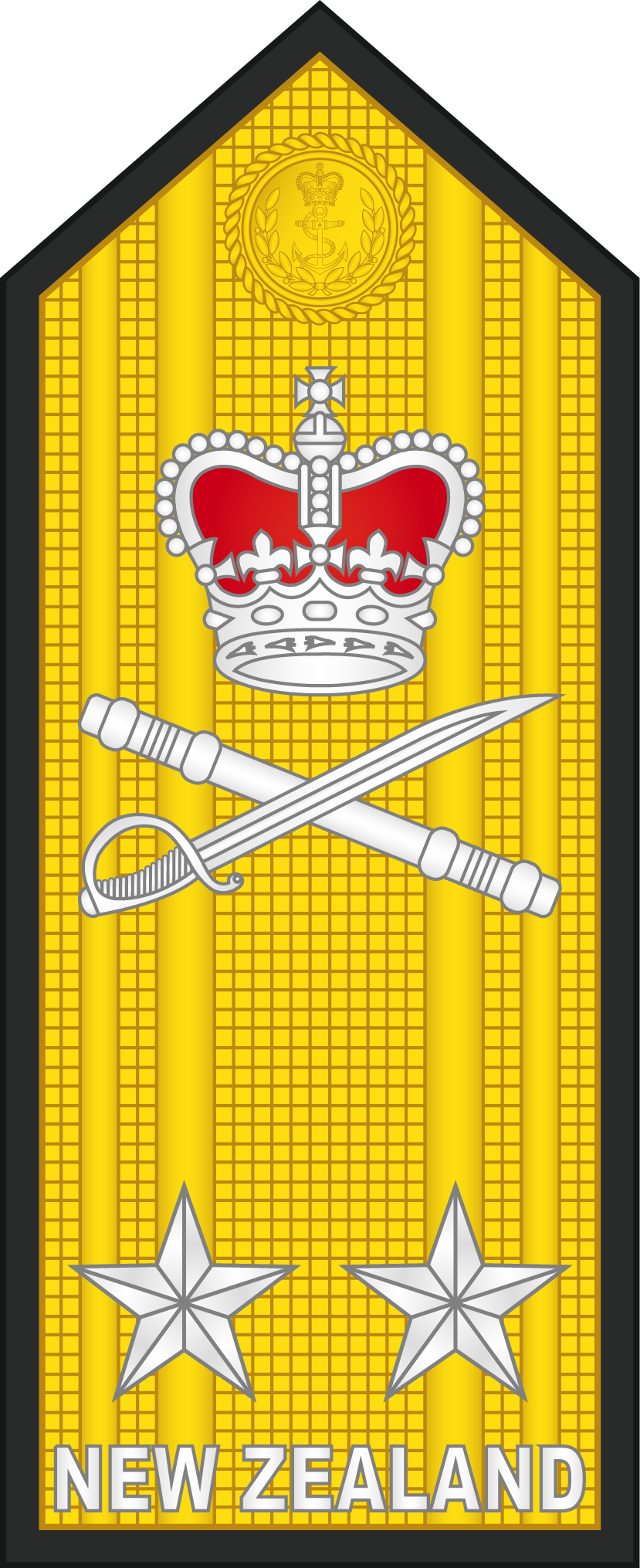
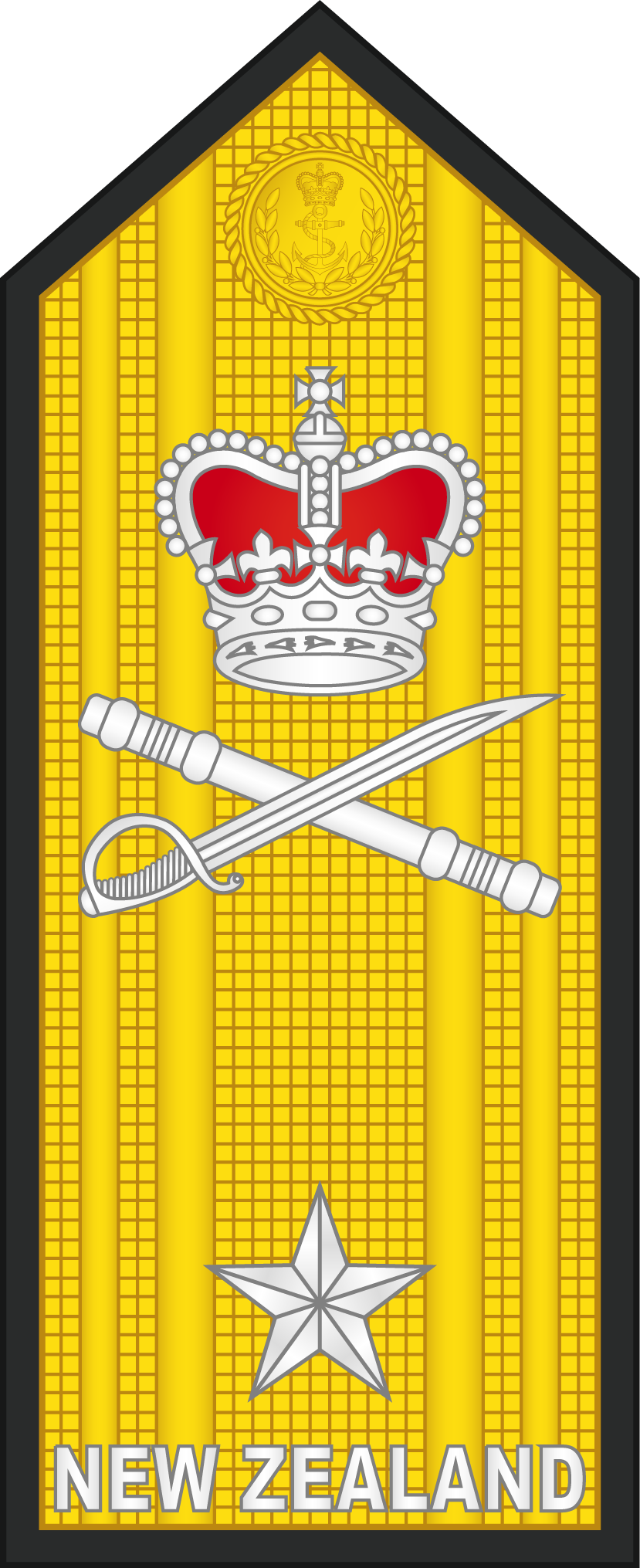
Rank group	General / flag officers				Senior officers			Junior officers
Royal New Zealand Navy
Royal New Zealand Navy	Admiral of the fleet	Vice admiral	Rear admiral	Commodore	Captain	Commander	Lieutenant commander	Lieutenant	Sub lieutenant	Ensign

==== Other ranks ====
The rank insignia of non-commissioned officers and enlisted personnel.

Rank group	Senior NCOs			Junior NCOs	Enlisted
Royal New Zealand Navy
Royal New Zealand Navy	Warrant officer	Chief petty officer	Petty officer	Leading hand	Able rate	Ordinary rate

== See also ==
- Military history of New Zealand
- New Zealand Sea Cadet Corps
- New Zealand military ranks
- New Zealand Defence College
- Logistics ships of the Royal New Zealand Navy
- Coastal Forces of the Royal New Zealand Navy
- List of individual weapons of the New Zealand armed forces
- List of ships of the Royal New Zealand Navy
