= HMAS Perth =

Three ships of the Royal Australian Navy (RAN) have been named HMAS Perth after Perth, the capital city of Western Australia.

- HMAS Perth (D29), a modified Leander-class light cruiser. Commissioned into the Royal Navy as HMS Amphion in 1936, she was sold to the RAN three years later. The ship served until 1 March 1942, when she was sunk during the Battle of Sunda Strait.
- HMAS Perth (D 38), the lead ship of the Perth-class guided missile destroyers. Built as a Charles F. Adams-class destroyer derivative for the RAN and commissioned in 1965, the ship served until decommissioning in 1999. She was sunk as a dive wreck off the coast of Albany, Western Australia, in 2001.
- HMAS Perth (FFH 157), an Anzac-class frigate commissioned in 2006 and active as of 2022.

== Battle honours ==
Nine battle honours have been awarded to ships named HMAS Perth.

- Atlantic 1939
- Malta Convoys 1941
- Matapan 1941
- Greece 1941
- Crete 1941
- Mediterranean 1941
- Pacific 1941–42
- Sunda Strait 1942
- Vietnam 1967–71
