= HMAS Arunta =

Two ships of the Royal Australian Navy have borne the name HMAS Arunta, a name derived from the Arrernte Aboriginals of central Australia.

- HMAS Arunta (I30), a Tribal-class destroyer commissioned in 1942 which served during World War II. The ship remained in service until 1968, and sank while being towed to Taiwan for scrapping.
- HMAS Arunta (FFH 151), an Anzac-class frigate commissioned in 1998 and in active service as of 2024

== Battle honours ==
Ships named HMAS Arunta have earned six battle honours:

- Pacific 1942–45
- New Guinea 1942–44
- Leyte Gulf 1944
- Lingayen Gulf 1945
- Borneo 1945
- Persian Gulf 2001–02
