= HMAS Perth (FFH 157) =

Anzac-class frigate of Royal Australian Navy

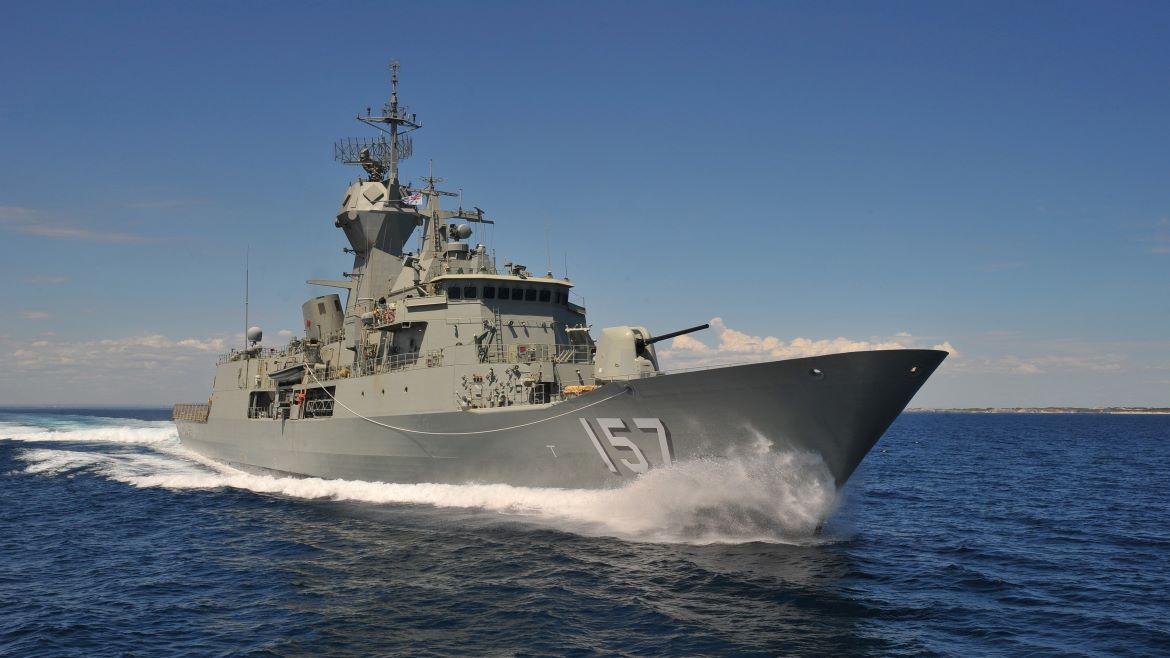
- HMAS Perth (FFH 157) at sea following her Anti-Ship Missile Defence upgrade

History

Australia
- Namesake: Perth
- Builder: Tenix Defence
- Laid down: 24 July 2003
- Launched: 20 March 2004
- Commissioned: 26 August 2006
- Home port: Fleet Base West
- Identification: MMSI number: 503100000
- Motto: "Fight And Flourish"
- Honours and awards: Nine inherited battle honours
- Status: Active as of 2019
- Badge

General characteristics
- Class & type: Anzac-class frigate
- Displacement: 3,810 tonnes full load
- Length: 118 m (387 ft)
- Beam: 15 m (49 ft)
- Draught: 4 m (13 ft)
- Propulsion: 1 × General Electric LM 2500 gas turbine providing 30,000 hp (22.5 mW); 2 × MTU 12v 1163 TB83 diesels providing 8,840 hp (6.5 mW)
- Speed: 27 knots (50 km/h; 31 mph)
- Range: 6,000 nautical miles (11,000 km; 6,900 mi) at 18 knots (33 km/h; 21 mph)
- Complement: approximately 170 sailors
- Sensors & processing systems: Sonars: Thomson Sintra Spherion B Mod 5; hull-mounted; active search and attack; medium frequency. Provision for towed array; Air search radar: Raytheon AN/SPS-49(V)8 ANZ (C/D-band); Search radar: CEA Technologies CEAFAR Active Phased Array Radar (S Band); Navigation: Kelvin Hughes Sharpeye (I-band); Passive Detection: Sagem Vampir NG Infrared Search/track; Target Illumination Radar: CEA Technologies CEAMOUNT Active Phased Array Illuminator (X Band); Combat data systems: Saab 9LV 453 Mk 3E.Link 11& Link16; Weapons control: Saab 9LV 453 radar/optronic director with CEA Solid State Continuous Wave Illuminator
- Electronic warfare & decoys: ESM: Racal modified Sceptre A (radar intercept), Telefunken PST-1720 Telegon 10 (comms intercept); Countermeasures: Decoys: G & D Aircraft SRBOC Mk 36 Mod 1 decoy launchers for SRBOC, BAE Systems Nulka active missile decoy
- Armament: Guns : 1 × 5 in/54 (127 mm) Mk 45 Mod 2 gun, 2 × Rafael Mini Typhoon 12.7mm (.50 cal) CIWS, small arms; Missiles: 2 × 4 Harpoon Block II anti-ship missiles, Mk 41 Mod 5 VLS for Sea Sparrow and Evolved Sea Sparrow; Torpedoes: 2 × triple 324 mm Mk 32 Mod 5 tubes with MU 90 Torpedo
- Aircraft carried: 1 × Sikorsky MH-60R Seahawk
- Notes: Post-Anti-Ship Missile Defence Project upgrade. See class article for original configuration.

HMAS Perth (FFH 157) is an Anzac-class frigate of the Royal Australian Navy (RAN). The last ship of the class to be completed, she was built by Tenix Defence and commissioned into the RAN in 2006. In 2007, Perth became the first major warship of the RAN to be commanded by a woman. During 2010 and 2011, the frigate was used as the testbed for a major upgrade to the Anzac class' ability to defend themselves from anti-ship missiles.

== Design and construction ==
The Anzac class originated from RAN plans to replace the six River-class destroyer escorts with a mid-capability patrol frigate. The Australian shipbuilding industry was thought to be incapable of warship design, so the RAN decided to take a proven foreign design and modify it. Around the same time, the Royal New Zealand Navy (RNZN) was looking to replace four Leander-class frigates; a deterioration in New Zealand-United States relations, the need to improve alliances with nearby nations, and the commonalities between the RAN and RNZN ships' requirements led the two nations to begin collaborating on the acquisition in 1987. Tenders were requested by the Anzac Ship Project at the end of 1986, with 12 ship designs (including an airship) submitted. By August 1987, the tenders were narrowed down in October to Blohm + Voss's MEKO 200 design, the M class (later Karel Doorman class) offered by Royal Schelde, and a scaled-down Type 23 frigate proposed by Yarrow Shipbuilders. In 1989, the Australian government announced that Melbourne-based shipbuilder AMECON (which became Tenix Defence) would build the modified MEKO 200 design. The Australians ordered eight ships, while New Zealand ordered two, with an unexercised option for two more.

The Anzacs are based on Blohm + Voss' MEKO 200 PN (or Vasco da Gama class) frigates, modified to meet Australian and New Zealand specifications and maximise the use of locally built equipment. Each frigate has a 3,600-tonne (3,500-long-ton; 4,000-short-ton) full load displacement. The ships are 109 metres (358 ft) long at the waterline, and 118 metres (387 ft) long overall, with a beam of 14.8 metres (49 ft), and a full load draught of 4.35 metres (14.3 ft). A Combined Diesel or Gas (CODOG) propulsion machinery layout is used, with a single, 30,172-horsepower (22,499 kW) General Electric LM2500-30 gas turbine and two 8,840-horsepower (6,590 kW) MTU 12V1163 TB83 diesel engines driving the ship's two controllable-pitch propellers. Maximum speed is 27 knots (50 km/h; 31 mph), and maximum range is over 6,000 nautical miles (11,000 km; 6,900 mi) at 18 knots (33 km/h; 21 mph); about 50% greater than other MEKO 200 designs.

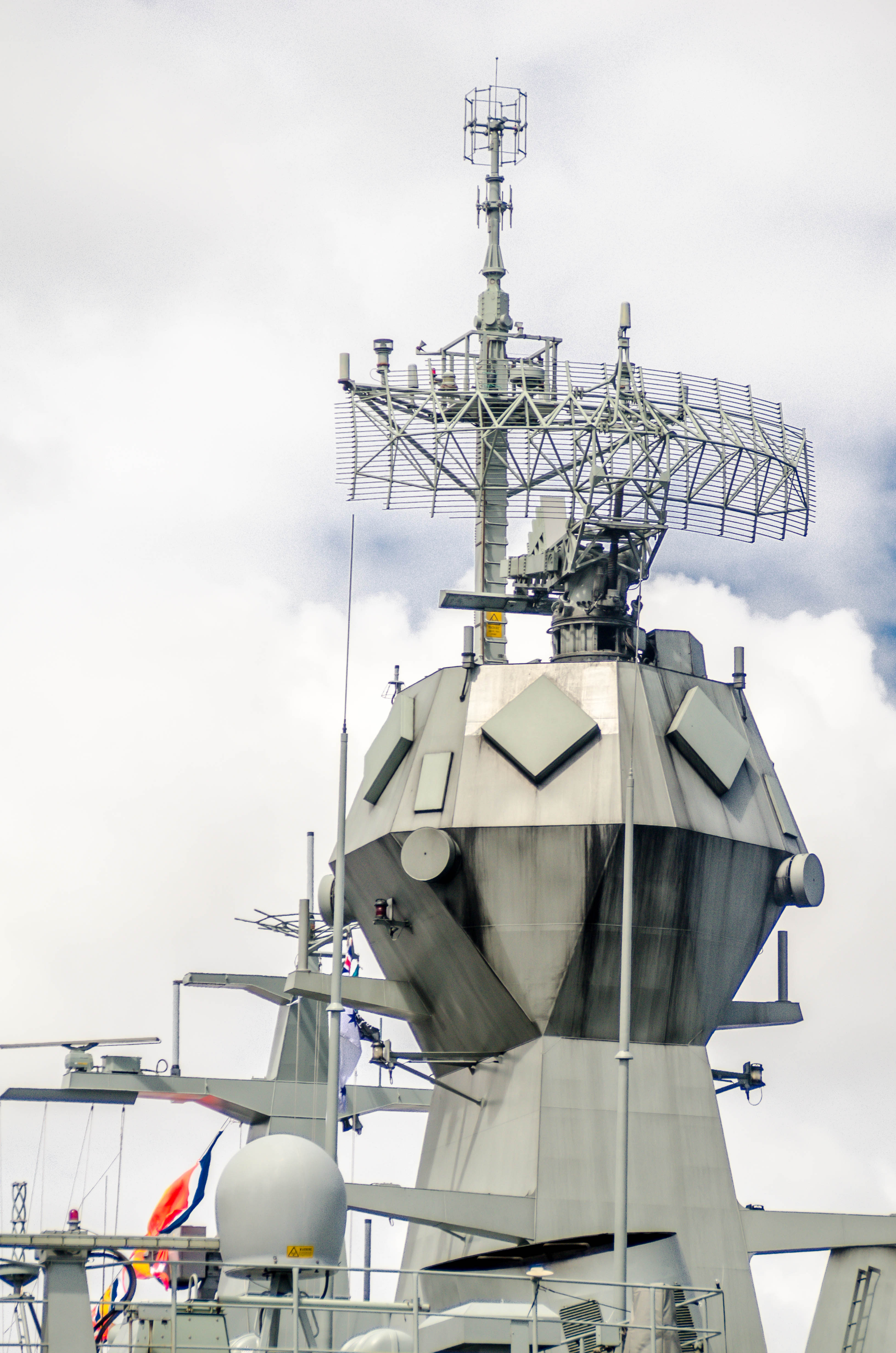
Closeup of Perth's CEAFAR phased array radars installed as part of the ASMD Project

As designed, the main armament for the frigate is a 5-inch 54 calibre Mark 45 gun, supplemented by an eight-cell Mark 41 vertical launch system (for RIM-7 Sea Sparrow or RIM-162 Evolved Sea Sparrow missiles), two 12.7-millimetre (0.50 in) machine guns, and two Mark 32 triple torpedo tube sets (initially firing Mark 46 torpedoes, but later upgraded to use the MU90 Impact torpedo). They were also designed for but not with a Mark 15 Phalanx close-in weapons system (two Mini Typhoons fitted when required from 2005 onwards), two quad-canister Harpoon anti-ship missile launchers (which were installed across the RAN vessels from 2005 onwards), and a second 8-cell Mark 41 VLS (which has not been added). The Australian Anzacs used a single Sikorsky S-70B-2 Seahawk helicopter; plans to replace them with Kaman SH-2G Super Seasprites were cancelled in 2008 due to ongoing problems. Instead, the S-70B-2 was replaced with the Sikorsky MH-60R Seahawk by late 2017.

Perth was laid down at Williamstown, Victoria, on 24 July 2003. The ship was assembled from six hull modules and six superstructure modules; the superstructure modules were fabricated in Whangarei, New Zealand, and hull modules were built at both Williamstown and Newcastle, New South Wales, with final integration at Williamstown. She was launched on 20 March 2004, and commissioned into the RAN on 26 August 2006 in Fremantle, Western Australia (the closest port to the ship's namesake city). Perth was the final Anzac-class ship to be constructed.

== Operational history ==
In mid-2007, Commander Michele Miller became the first woman to command a major RAN warship when she assumed command of Perth.

On 18 January 2010, Perth docked at the Australian Marine Complex in Henderson, Western Australia to be modified under the Anti-Ship Missile Defence Project. The upgrade, intended to improve the class' anti-ship self-defence capability, included the fitting of CEA Technologies' CEAFAR and CEAMOUNT phased array radars, a Vampir NG Infrared Search and Track system, and Sharpeye Navigational Radar Systems, along with improvements to the operations room equipment and layout. Both of the frigate's masts were replaced; the top of the aft mast now sits at 38.7 metres (127 ft), making Perth the second-tallest ship in the RAN. Because of the added equipment, additional ballast was added to improve the frigate's stability, and the ship's quarterdeck was enclosed. The additional weight brought the ship's full load displacement to 3,810 tons. After the upgrade was completed in October 2010, Perth was used to trial the modifications before they were rolled out to the rest of the Australian Anzacs: alongside and harbour trials at HMAS Stirling were successfully completed in February 2011, and full sea trials began on 21 February. On 27 April, the frigate sailed to the east coast of Australia to continue trials, with further testing to occur at the United States Navy's Pacific Missile Range Facility, then during Exercise Talisman Sabre. Testing was completed by July 2011, and the rollout of the ASMD upgrade across the class was approved in November 2011.

In October 2013, Perth participated in the International Fleet Review 2013 in Sydney.

During February and March 2015, an MH-60R Seahawk Romeo helicopter from 725 Squadron RAN was embarked aboard Perth for at-sea trials of the new helicopter.

In June 2016 Perth was deployed to the Middle East Region on Operation Manitou as part of the coalition taskforce to stop criminal activities such as piracy and drug trafficking. Perth was the Royal Australian Navy's 63rd ship rotation since 1991.

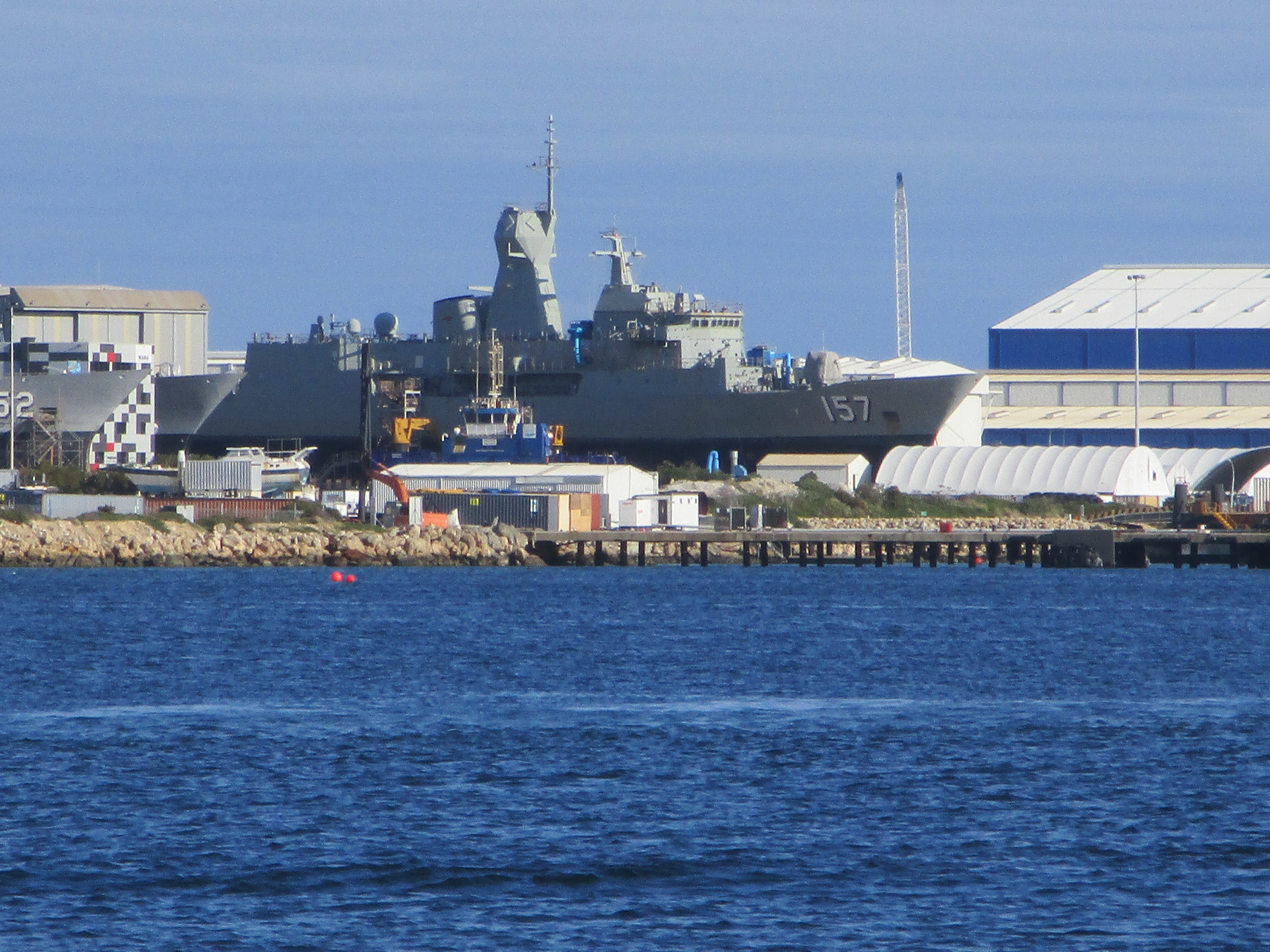
Perth at the Australian Marine Complex hardstand

In 2017 the Navy decided to place Perth in 'extended readiness' from December that year as it was unable to crew the vessel. From late 2018, Perth underwent the Anzac-class frigate Midlife Capability Assurance Program (AMCAP) upgrade at the Australian Marine Complex, Henderson, Western Australia. In 2019 it was reported that Perth would not re-enter service until 2021 as the Navy still did not have enough sailors to form a crew. The crew of HMAS Arunta were transferred to Perth in early 2021, and the ship was scheduled to begin sea trials following the upgrades in June that year.
