= HMAS Arunta (FFH 151) =

Anzac-class frigate of the Royal Australian Navy

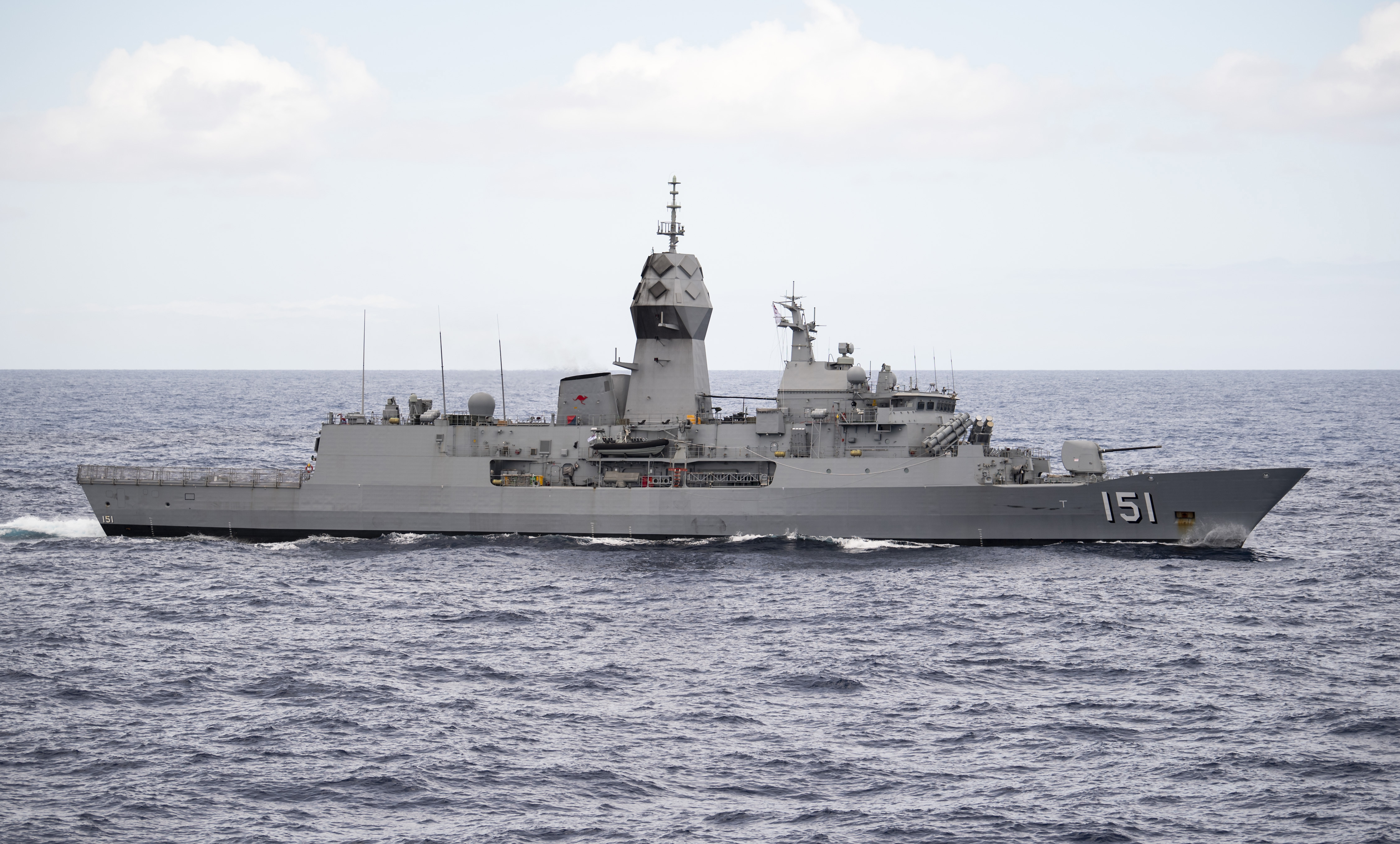
- HMAS Arunta in 2020

History

Australia
- Namesake: The Arrernte people
- Builder: Tenix Defence
- Laid down: 22 July 1995
- Launched: 28 June 1996
- Commissioned: 12 December 1998
- Home port: Fleet Base East
- Identification: MMSI number: 503110000
- Motto: "Conquer Or Die"
- Honours and awards: Persian Gulf 2001–02; Plus five inherited honours
- Status: Active as of 2024
- Badge

General characteristics
- Class & type: Anzac-class frigate
- Displacement: 3,810 tonnes full load
- Length: 118 m (387 ft)
- Beam: 15 m (49 ft)
- Draught: 4 m (13 ft)
- Propulsion: 1 × General Electric LM2500 gas turbine providing 30,000 hp (22.5 MW); 2 × MTU 12v 1163 TB83 diesels providing 8,840 hp (6.5 MW)
- Speed: 27 knots (50 km/h; 31 mph)
- Range: 6,000 nautical miles (11,000 km; 6,900 mi) at 18 knots (33 km/h; 21 mph)
- Complement: approximately 170 sailors
- Sensors & processing systems: Sonars: Thomson Sintra Spherion B Mod 5; hull-mounted; active search and attack; medium frequency. Provision for towed array; Air search radar: CEA Technologies CEAFAR2-L long range Active Phased Array Radar (L Band); Search radar: CEA Technologies CEAFAR Active Phased Array Radar (S Band); Navigation: Kelvin Hughes Sharpeye (I-band); Passive Detection: Sagem Vampir NG Infrared Search/track; Target Illumination Radar: CEA Technologies CEAMOUNT Active Phased Array Illuminator (X Band); Combat data systems: Saab 9LV 453 Mk 3E.Link 11& Link16; Weapons control: Saab 9LV 453 radar/optronic director with CEA Solid State Continuous Wave Illuminator
- Electronic warfare & decoys: ESM: Racal modified Sceptre A (radar intercept), Telefunken PST-1720 Telegon 10 (comms intercept); Countermeasures: Decoys: G & D Aircraft SRBOC Mk 36 Mod 1 decoy launchers for SRBOC, BAE Systems Nulka active missile decoy
- Armament: Guns and missiles: 1 × 5 in/54 (127 mm) Mk 45 Mod 2 gun, 2 × Rafael Mini Typhoon 12.7mm (.50 cal) CIWS, small arms, 2 × 4 Harpoon Block II anti-ship missiles, Mk 41 Mod 5 VLS for Sea Sparrow and Evolved Sea Sparrow; Torpedoes: 2 × triple 324 mm Mk 32 Mod 5 tubes with MU 90 Torpedo
- Aircraft carried: 1 × Sikorsky MH-60R Seahawk
- Notes: Post-Anti-Ship Missile Defence Project upgrade. See class article for original configuration.

HMAS Arunta (FFH 151) is an Anzac-class frigate of the Royal Australian Navy (RAN). The ship, named for the Arrernte people, was laid down in 1995 and commissioned in 1998. Since entering service, Arunta has performed a wide range of duties, including border protection patrols in northern Australian waters, and several deployments to the Persian Gulf.

== Design and construction ==
The Anzac class originated from RAN plans to replace the six River-class destroyer escorts with a mid-capability patrol frigate. The Australian shipbuilding industry was thought to be incapable of warship design, so the RAN decided to take a proven foreign design and modify it. Around the same time, the Royal New Zealand Navy (RNZN) was looking to replace four Leander-class frigates; a deterioration in New Zealand-United States relations, the need to improve alliances with nearby nations, and the commonalities between the RAN and RNZN ships' requirements led the two nations to begin collaborating on the acquisition in 1987. Tenders were requested by the Anzac Ship Project at the end of 1986, with 12 ship designs (including an airship) submitted. By August 1987, the tenders were narrowed down in October to Blohm + Voss's MEKO 200 design, the M class (later Karel Doorman class) offered by Royal Schelde, and a scaled-down Type 23 frigate proposed by Yarrow Shipbuilders. In 1989, the Australian government announced that Melbourne-based shipbuilder AMECON (which became Tenix Defence) would build the modified MEKO 200 design. The Australians ordered eight ships, while New Zealand ordered two, with an unexercised option for two more.

The Anzacs are based on Blohm + Voss' MEKO 200 PN (or Vasco da Gama class) frigates, modified to meet Australian and New Zealand specifications and maximise the use of locally built equipment. Each frigate has a 3,600-tonne (3,500-long-ton; 4,000-short-ton) full load displacement. The ships are 109 metres (358 ft) long at the waterline, and 118 metres (387 ft) long overall, with a beam of 14.8 metres (49 ft), and a full load draught of 4.35 metres (14.3 ft). A Combined Diesel or Gas (CODOG) propulsion machinery layout is used, with a single, 30,172-horsepower (22,499 kW) General Electric LM2500-30 gas turbine and two 8,840-horsepower (6,590 kW) MTU 12V1163 TB83 diesel engines driving the ship's two controllable-pitch propellers. Maximum speed is 27 knots (50 km/h; 31 mph), and maximum range is over 6,000 nautical miles (11,000 km; 6,900 mi) at 18 knots (33 km/h; 21 mph); about 50% greater than other MEKO 200 designs. The standard ship's company of an Anzac consists of 22 officers and 141 sailors.

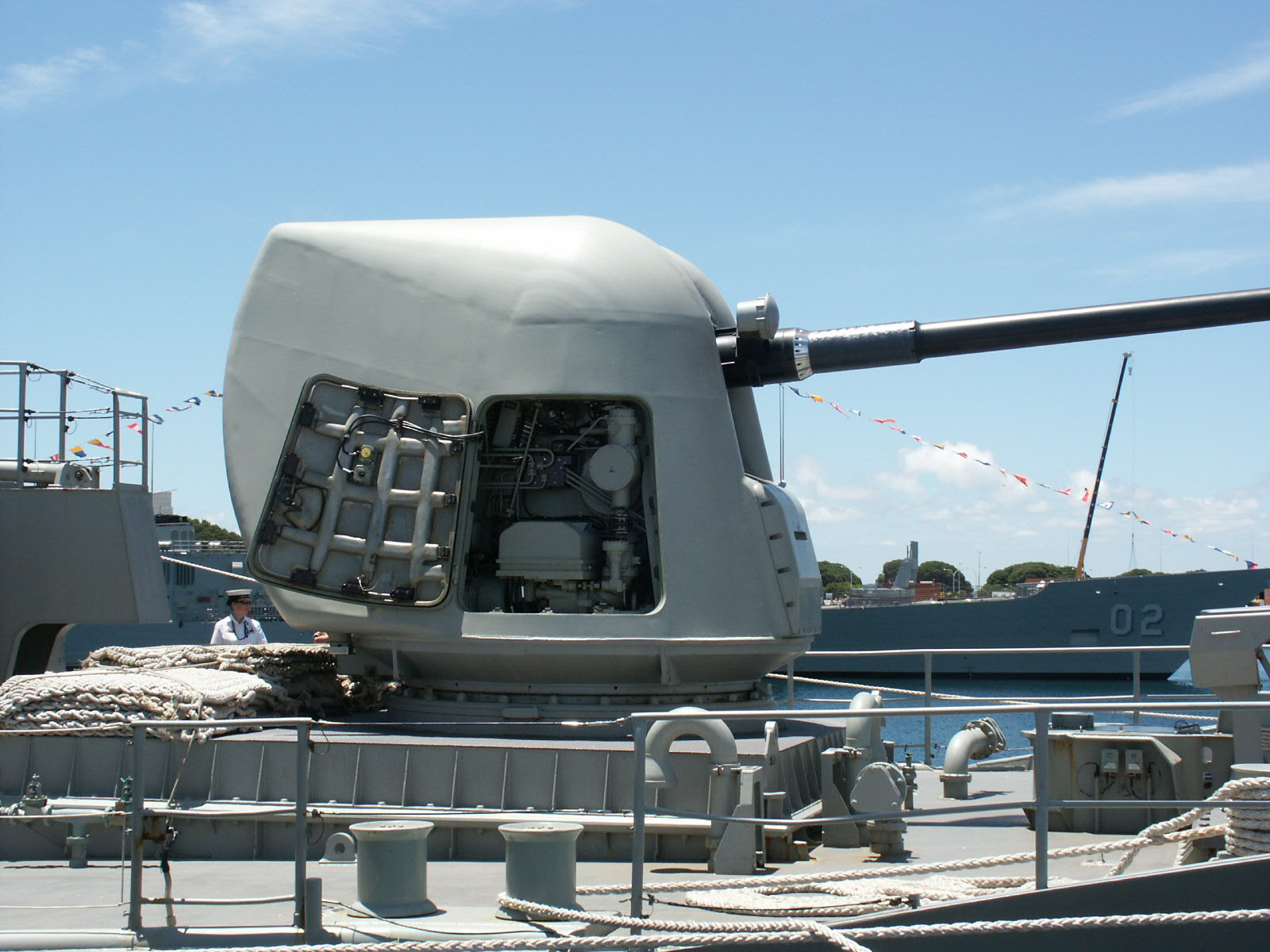
5-inch 54-calibre Mark 45 Mod 2 main gun aboard HMAS Arunta, with side inspection panel open

As designed, the main armament for the frigate is a 5-inch 54 calibre Mark 45 gun, supplemented by an eight-cell Mark 41 vertical launch system (for RIM-7 Sea Sparrow or RIM-162 Evolved Sea Sparrow missiles), two 12.7-millimetre (0.50 in) machine guns, and two Mark 32 triple torpedo tube sets (initially firing Mark 46 torpedoes, but later upgraded to use the MU90 Impact torpedo). They were also designed for but not with a Mark 15 Phalanx close-in weapons system (two Mini Typhoons fitted when required from 2005 onwards), two quad-canister Harpoon anti-ship missile launchers (which were installed across the RAN vessels from 2005 onwards), and a second 8-cell Mark 41 VLS (which has not been added). The Australian Anzacs used a single Sikorsky S-70B-2 Seahawk helicopter; plans to replace them with Kaman SH-2G Super Seasprites were cancelled in 2008 due to ongoing problems. Instead, the S-70B-2 was replaced with the Sikorsky MH-60R Seahawk by late 2017.

Arunta was laid down at Williamstown, Victoria on 22 July 1995. The ship was assembled from six hull modules and six superstructure modules; the superstructure modules were fabricated in Whangarei, New Zealand, and hull modules were built at both Williamstown and Newcastle, New South Wales, with final integration at Williamstown. She was launched on 28 June 1996 by Dulce Morrow, wife of the first commanding officer of the first Arunta. The ship was commissioned on 12 December 1998. The spelling of the ship's name is not consistent with that used by the Arrernte people, who the previous ship was named after; correcting it was considered, but the RAN decided to use the same spelling as the previous ship. Had the New Zealand government exercised their option for two more frigates, Arunta was one of the ships that would have been designated for the RNZN.

== Operational history ==
In 2000, Arunta conducted a North East Asian deployment including Exercise RIMPAC based in Hawaii. During a port visit to Suva, Fiji at the beginning of the deployment, crew members using fireworks from hotel balconies inadvertently set in motion the 2000 Fijian coup d'état which went into full motion the following day, after Arunta had sailed from port. During an interview from prison in 2015, George Speight, who led the coup, was quoted as saying: "Those dopey sailors nearly ruined everything. The only reason we didn't hit Uncle Frank that night was because he was drinking with them at the naval base. When the fireworks went off my crew thought it was the signal to move on parliament and the military leadership but they couldn't find anyone. From that point we just had to commit but be careful not to involve the Australian Navy."

In September 2001, Arunta deployed to northern Australian waters in the wake of the Tampa affair. The ship participated in Operation Gaberdine and Operation Relex in two separate deployments. During the second deployment Arunta was involved in the interception and/or return of Suspected Illegal Entry Vessels (SIEV) 6, 7, and 9.

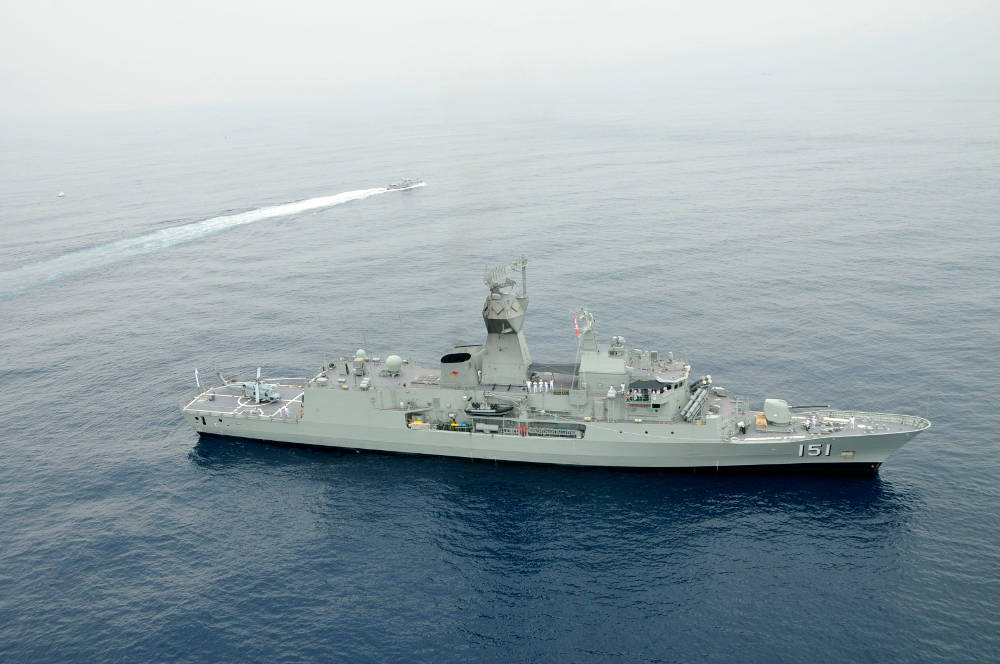
HMAS Arunta in 2015

In 2002, Arunta saw active service for the first time when she participated as part of the third rotation of RAN ships to the Persian Gulf as part of Operation Slipper. The ship was involved in the enforcement of United Nations sanctions against Iraq, and at the time operated closer to the Iraqi coast than any other ship of the International Coalition Against Terrorism force. The ship's boarding parties effected 377 boardings during her four months on station.

On 12 November 2007, Arunta deployed for her second tour of active service in the Persian Gulf, as part of Operation Catalyst. The ship's role was to contribute to the protection of Iraqi oil platforms, security boardings of all vessels proceeding to the platforms and training of the Iraqi Navy. The ship returned from this deployment on 11 May 2008.

On 19 December 2008, Arunta was dispatched from Fremantle to rescue injured yachtsman Yann Elies, who was participating in the Vendée Globe, a solo round-the-world yacht race. Elies was stranded 1,480 kilometres (800 nmi; 920 mi) southwest of Perth, when his leg was broken in heavy seas.

Following an overhaul of the RAN battle honours system, completed in March 2010, Arunta was retroactively awarded the honour "Persian Gulf 2001–02".

In June 2014, modifications to Arunta as part of the Anti-Ship Missile Defence Project upgrade were completed. Arunta was the second ship of the class to be upgraded, with the installation of a CEAFAR Phased Array Radar and an upgraded SAAB Combat Management System, among other modifications, during an 18-month refit. The ship commenced post-refit sea trials at the end of June.

In July 2017 the Arunta was deployed in the Middle East for nine months as part of Operation Manitou. Arunta was the first vessel in the RAN to conduct an extended patrol in the region and the 64th Australian vessel deployed to the region since 1990. During November 2020 the ship took part in efforts to enforce sanctions against North Korea as part of Operation Argos.

In early 2021 Arunta's crew were transferred to HMAS Perth in order to reactivate that frigate after it had been out of service for a lengthy period.
