= Anzac-class frigate =

Australian military ship class

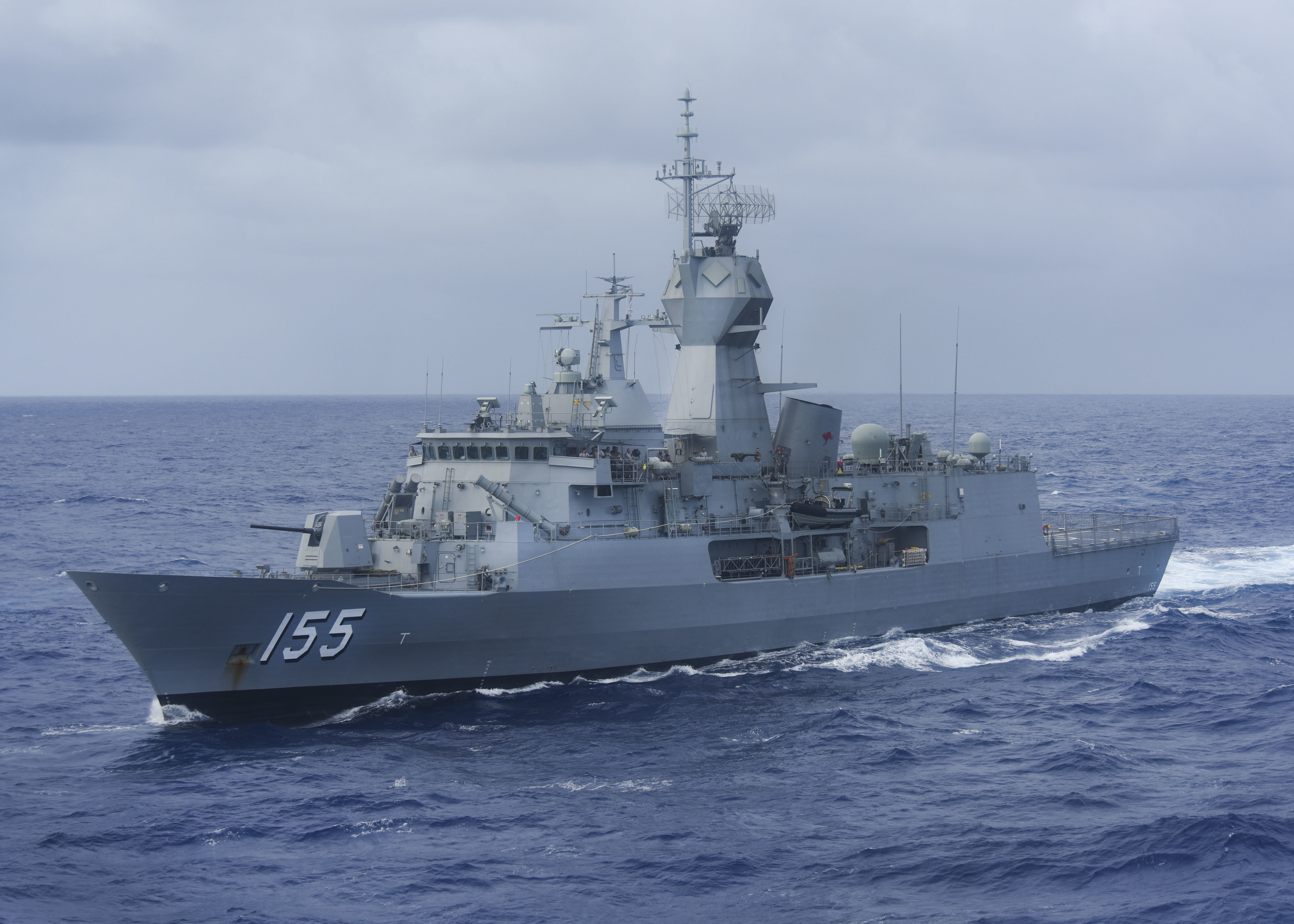
- HMAS Ballarat in 2016.

Class overview
- Name: Anzac
- Builders: AMECON
- Operators: Royal Australian Navy (RAN); Royal New Zealand Navy (RNZN)
- Preceded by: River-class destroyer escort (RAN); Leander class (RNZN)
- Succeeded by: New FFM-class (RAN)
- Built: 1993–2006
- In commission: 1996–present (RAN); 1997–present (RNZN)
- Planned: 12
- Completed: 10
- Cancelled: 2
- Active: 9
- Retired: 1

General characteristics as designed
- Type: Frigate
- Displacement: 3,600 t (3,500 long tons) full load displacement
- Length: 109 m (357 ft 7 in) waterline length; 118 m (387 ft 2 in) length overall
- Beam: 14.8 m (48 ft 7 in)
- Draught: 4.35 m (14 ft 3 in) at full load
- Propulsion: Combined Diesel or Gas (CODOG): 1 × General Electric LM2500-30 gas turbine, 30,172 hp (22,499 kW); 2 × MTU 12V1163 TB83 diesel engines, 8,840 hp (6,590 kW) each; 2 × controllable-pitch propellers
- Speed: 27 knots (50 km/h; 31 mph)
- Range: 6,000 nmi (11,000 km; 6,900 mi) at 18 knots (33 km/h; 21 mph)
- Boats & landing craft carried: 3 x 7.2 m Juliet 3 RHIBs (although only 2 are normally carried)
- Complement: 22 officers, 141 sailors and 16 government worker or air crew.
- Sensors & processing systems: Radar: Original fit; Raytheon SPS-49(V)8 ANZ aerial search and long-range surveillance; Saab 9LV Combat Management System; Saab Sea Giraffe Target Indication Radar for air and surface search; Krupp Atlas 9600 Navigation RADAR; Saab9LV 453 Ceros 200 Fire Control Radar and Continuous Wave Illuminator; ASMD fit; Raytheon SPS-49(V)8 ANZ L-band Radar; CEAFAR1-S S-band Active Phased Array Radar; Kelvin Hughes Sharp Eye Navigation Radar; CEAMOUNT Fire Control Illuminators; Saab Systems Ceros 200 Fire Control Director; Cossor AIMS Mk XII IFF; Combat Data Systems; Saab Systems 9LV453 Mk3E; Electronic Countermeasures; JEDS 3701 electronic support measures; Telefunken PST-1720 comms intercept; AMCAP fit; CEAFAR2-L L-band Active Phased Array Radar; NZ Anzac Frigate Systems Upgrade; Thales SMART-S Mk2 S-band PESA radar; Kelvin Hughes Sharp Eye Navigation Radar; Furuno FAR-3320W radar; Cossor AIMS Mk XII IFF; Combat Data Systems; Lockheed Martin Canada CMS330; Electronic Countermeasures; Elbit/Elisra electronic support measures; Rheinmetall MASS Offboard ECM; Ultra Electronics Sea Sentor torpedo countermeasures; Airborne Systems DLF floating decoy; Sonar: ThomsonSintra Spherion B hull-mounted bow sonar; Petrel Mine and Obstacle Avoidance Sonar system; Fitted for but not with towed-array sonar; Other: Cossor AIMS Mark XII identification-friend-or-foe system
- Electronic warfare & decoys: Mark 36 SRBOC launchers; SLQ-25A towed torpedo decoy; Nulka decoy launchers; Rascal Thorn modified Sceptre-A electronic support measures; Telefunken PST-1720 Telegon 10 radar intercept unit
- Armament: Missiles: RAN; 8-cell Tactical Mark 41 Vertical Launch System firing 32 quad-packed RIM-162 ESSM; 2 × 4-canister Harpoon or NSM anti-ship missiles; RNZN; 20-cell GWS.35 VLS firing 20 Sea Ceptor surface-to-air missiles; Torpedoes: 2 × Mark 32 triple torpedo launchers; RAN: MU90 Impact torpedoes; RNZN: Mark 46 torpedoes; Guns: RAN and RNZN; 1 × 5-inch/54 calibre Mark 45 mod 2 main gun; 2 × .50 cal machine guns on Mini Typhoon mounts; 6 x .50 cal machine guns crew served; RNZN; 1 × 20 mm Vulcan Phalanx close-in weapons system; Fitted for but not with; RAN; 1 × close-in weapons system; 2nd 8-cell Mark 41 VLS; RNZN; 2 × 4-canister anti-ship missiles
- Aircraft carried: 1 helicopter; RAN: Sikorsky MH-60R Seahawk; RNZN: Kaman SH-2G Super Seasprite
- Notes: For upgrades and current configurations, see the sections on "Australian modifications" and "New Zealand modifications", or the individual ship articles

The Anzac class (also identified as the ANZAC class and the MEKO 200 ANZ type) is a ship class of ten frigates; eight operated by the Royal Australian Navy (RAN) and two operated by the Royal New Zealand Navy (RNZN).

During the 1980s, the RAN began plans to replace the River-class destroyer escorts (based on the British Leander-class frigate) with a mid-capability patrol frigate and settled on the idea of modifying a proven German design for Australian conditions. Around the same time, the RNZN was seeking to replace their Leander-class frigates while maintaining blue-water capabilities. A souring of relations between New Zealand and the United States in relation to New Zealand's nuclear-free zone and the ANZUS security treaty prompted New Zealand to seek improved ties with other nations, particularly Australia. As both nations were seeking warships of similar capabilities, the decision was made in 1987 to collaborate on their acquisition.

The project name (and later, the class name) is taken from the Australian and New Zealand Army Corps of the First World War.

Twelve ship designs were tendered in 1986. By 1989, the project had selected a proposal by Germany's Blohm + Voss, based on their MEKO 200 design, to be built in Australia by AMECON at Williamstown, Victoria. The modular design of the frigates allowed sections to be constructed at Whangārei, New Zealand and Newcastle, New South Wales in addition to Williamstown. The RAN ordered eight ships, while the RNZN ordered two and had the option to add two more. The frigate acquisition was controversial and widely opposed in New Zealand, and as a result, the additional ships were not ordered.

In 1992, work started on the frigates; 3,600-tonne (3,500-long-ton) ships capable of a 27-knot (50 km/h; 31 mph) top speed, and a range of 6,000 nautical miles (11,000 km; 6,900 mi) at 18 knots (33 km/h; 21 mph). The armament initially consisted of a single 5-inch gun and a point-defence missile system, supported by a missile-armed helicopter. In addition, the ships were fitted for but not with a torpedo system, anti-ship missiles, and a close-in weapons system. The last ship of the class entered service in 2006; by this point, the RAN and RNZN had embarked on separate projects to improve the frigates' capabilities by fitting the additional weapons, along with updates to other systems and equipment.

Since entering service, Anzac-class frigates have made multiple deployments outside local waters, including involvement in the INTERFET multi-national deployment to East Timor, and multiple operational periods in the Persian Gulf. As of 2024, nine ships are in service following HMAS Anzac's decommissioning in May 2024. The RAN intends to start replacing its frigates in 2024, while the RNZN ships will remain active until the mid-2030s.

== Planning and development ==
The Anzac class originated from the RAN's New Surface Combatant (NSC) project, which began in the mid-1980s to find a replacement for the RAN's six River-class destroyer escorts. By 1985, various design briefs ranging from 1,200 to 5,000 tonnes (1,200 to 4,900 long tons) displacement were under consideration, with the RAN emphasising anti-ship missile defence, damage control, and ship survivability based on Royal Navy experiences during the Falklands War. Eventually, the project settled on a ship of approximately 3,600 tonnes (3,500 long tons) displacement. At this time, it was also believed that Australia did not have the capability to design a major warship from scratch, so the decision was made to select a proven foreign design and fit it with an Australian-developed combat system. In early 1986, a review of policy regarding surface combatants saw the NSC classified into the middle of three tiers: a patrol frigate designed to operate on low- to mid-intensity operations in Australia's economic exclusion zone.

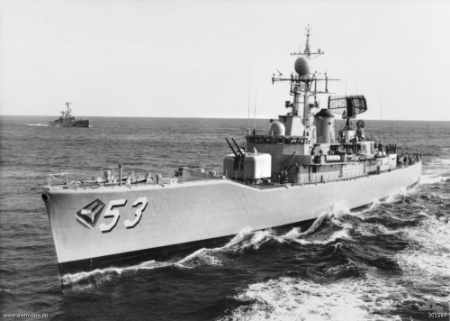
HMA Ships Torrens (foreground) and Yarra exercising; two of the River-class destroyer escorts the RAN was looking to replace. The Leander-class frigates the RNZN were retiring were of a similar design, with both classes based on the British Type 12 frigate.

Around the same time, the need to replace the RNZN's Leander-class frigate force with new warships was under consideration. The government saw maintaining a blue-water capable force built around three or four frigates as important, but the cost of acquiring and maintaining such a force was prohibitive, once it became clear on the basis of RN and RAN studies that the generally favored Type 21 design lacked the space and volume for the required range and development. A joint Anzac project offered the RNZN the first chance in 20 years for new deepwater warships. The NZ 1983 Defence Review on the basis of RN theoretical study and enthusiasm for the 2400 Vicker sub-project, saw a submarine force as the only way of maintaining an RNZN as a combat force, and the Muldoon government actually entered into a memo of understanding with Australia for the joint development of what became the Collins-class submarines and assigned staff to the Australian project. However, it became clear that surface vessels were also required and the cost risk was too high. Alternate suggestions, such as reducing the RNZN to a coast guard-type force responsible for coastal and fisheries protection, replacing the frigates with smaller offshore patrol vessels, or reorienting the navy to primarily operate submarines, were made in several venues, but were seen as an unacceptable loss in capability. Around the same time, the 1984-elected Fourth Labour Government of New Zealand implemented a nuclear-free zone, which incensed the United States and led to a deterioration of relations between the two nations, including the American withdrawal of support for New Zealand under the ANZUS security treaty. In response, the New Zealand government sought to improve ties with Australia; one such avenue was to promote military interoperability between the countries by standardising equipment and procedures where possible. The Australian NSC project was seen to have "virtually identical" requirements to the RNZN's proposed Replacement Combat Ship concept, and the need to replace the warships dovetailed with the need to improve relations with Australia.

On 6 March 1987, a Memorandum of Understanding was signed by the two nations and RNZN representatives were invited to collaborate on the project. To recognise their involvement, the project was renamed the Anzac Ship Project, taking the name from the Australian and New Zealand Army Corps of World War I. The New Zealanders' involvement was structured to allow their involvement in the selection of the design and shipyard and explore options for New Zealand industry involvement. When the time came to commit, they could either continue cooperating into the construction stage of the project, independently order the ships from the designer or abandon the project entirely.

The proposed baseline characteristics called for a vessel capable of reaching speeds of 27 knots (50 km/h; 31 mph) and a range of 6,000 nautical miles (11,000 km; 6,900 mi) at 18 knots (33 km/h; 21 mph) based on a combined diesel or gas (CODOG) propulsion system, able to operate in Sea State 5, and capable of operating a Seahawk-size helicopter. The ship was to be fitted with a 76 or 127 mm (3.0 or 5.0 in) main gun and an eight-cell launcher for a point-defence missile system, and fitted for but not with a torpedo system, anti-ship missiles, and a close-in weapons system. Tenders were requested by the project at the end of 1986, and 19 submissions were made, 12 of which included ship designs: the Netherlands' M-class (later Karel Doorman-class) frigate, a design based on the German MEKO 200 multipurpose frigate design, Italy's Maestrale-class frigate, the French F2000 design, the Canadian Halifax-class frigate, the German Type 122 (later Bremen-class frigate), Norway's Nordkapp-class offshore patrol vessel, the British Type 23 frigate (which was proposed by two different shipyards), South Korea's Ulsan-class frigate, and an airship design proposed by Airship Industries. By August 1987, a cost ceiling of A$3.5 billion (1986 terms) was established, and the submitted proposals were narrowed down in October to Blohm + Voss's MEKO design, the M class offered by Royal Schelde, and a scaled-down version of the British Type 23 proposed by Yarrow Shipbuilders. The Type 23 proposal was eliminated in November 1987, with the other two going into a development phase where the designer partnered with an Australian shipbuilder: Blohm + Voss with AMECON, and Royal Schelde with Australian Warship Systems.

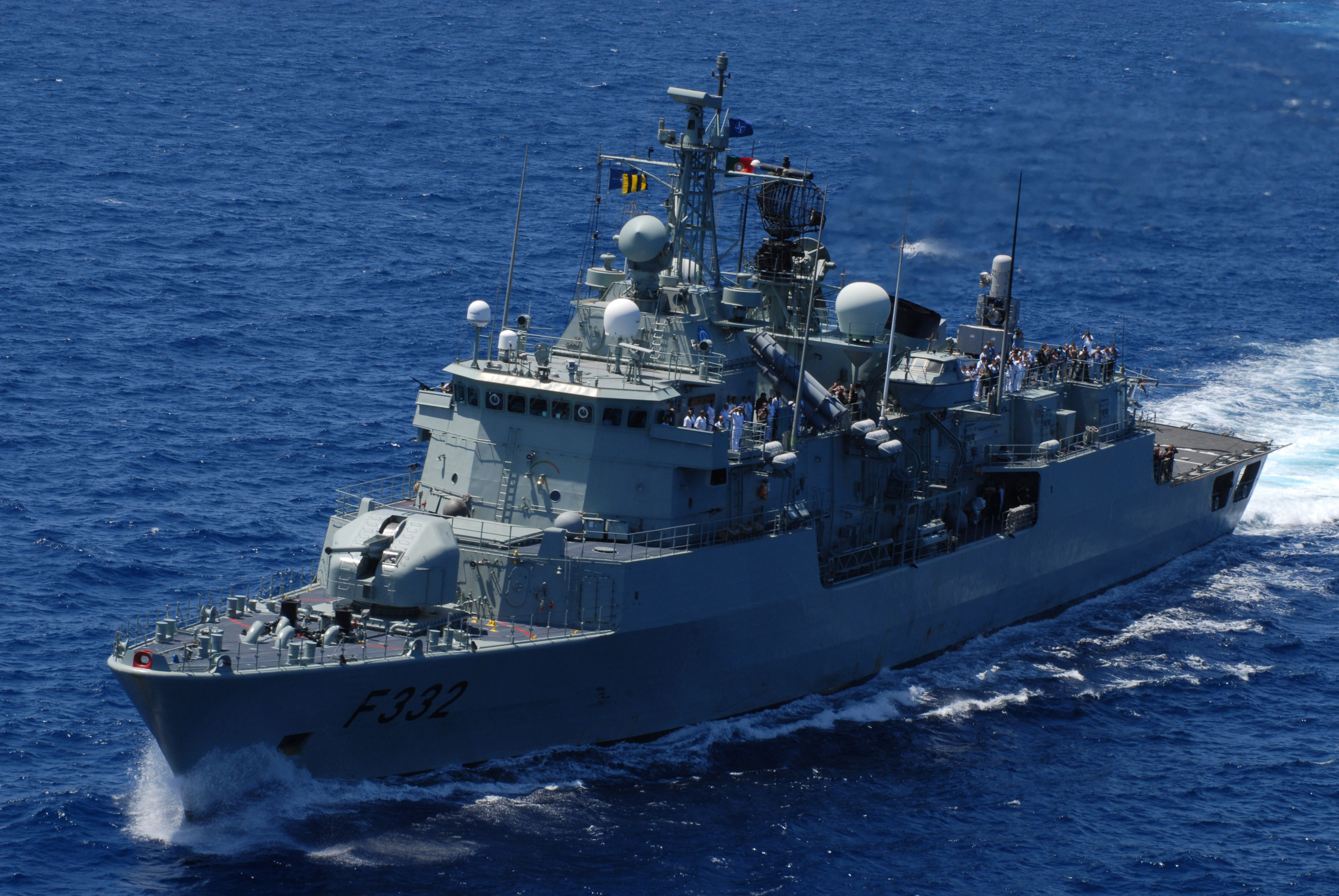
The Portuguese frigate NRP Corte-Real. The MEKO 200 variant designed for the Portuguese was the basis of Blohm + Voss and AMECON's successful proposal.

On 14 August 1989, the Australian government announced that AMECON had been awarded the tender for construction of the Anzac class based on modified MEKO 200 design. Although both the MEKO 200 and M-class designs met the design requirements, the MEKO design was selected as more ships could be purchased for the budget cost. The A$5 billion contract was, at the time, the largest defence contract awarded in Australia. The decision was made despite ongoing debate in New Zealand over the project. New Zealand committed in principle to the purchase of two frigates plus the option for two more on 7 September, and the contract for the first two ships was signed on 10 November.

In 1992, the Australian Force Structure Review contained plans to replace the three Perth-class guided-missile destroyers and four of the six Adelaide-class guided-missile frigates with air defence vessels. The initial proposal – to build an additional six Anzac-class frigates configured for wide-area anti-aircraft warfare – did not go ahead as the Anzac design was too small to effectively host all the required equipment and weapons. Instead, the RAN began to upgrade the Adelaides in 1999 to fill the anti-aircraft capability that would be lost when the Perths left service between 1999 and 2001, and began work on a long-term replacement of the destroyers with what became the Hobart-class air warfare destroyer.

=== New Zealand controversy ===
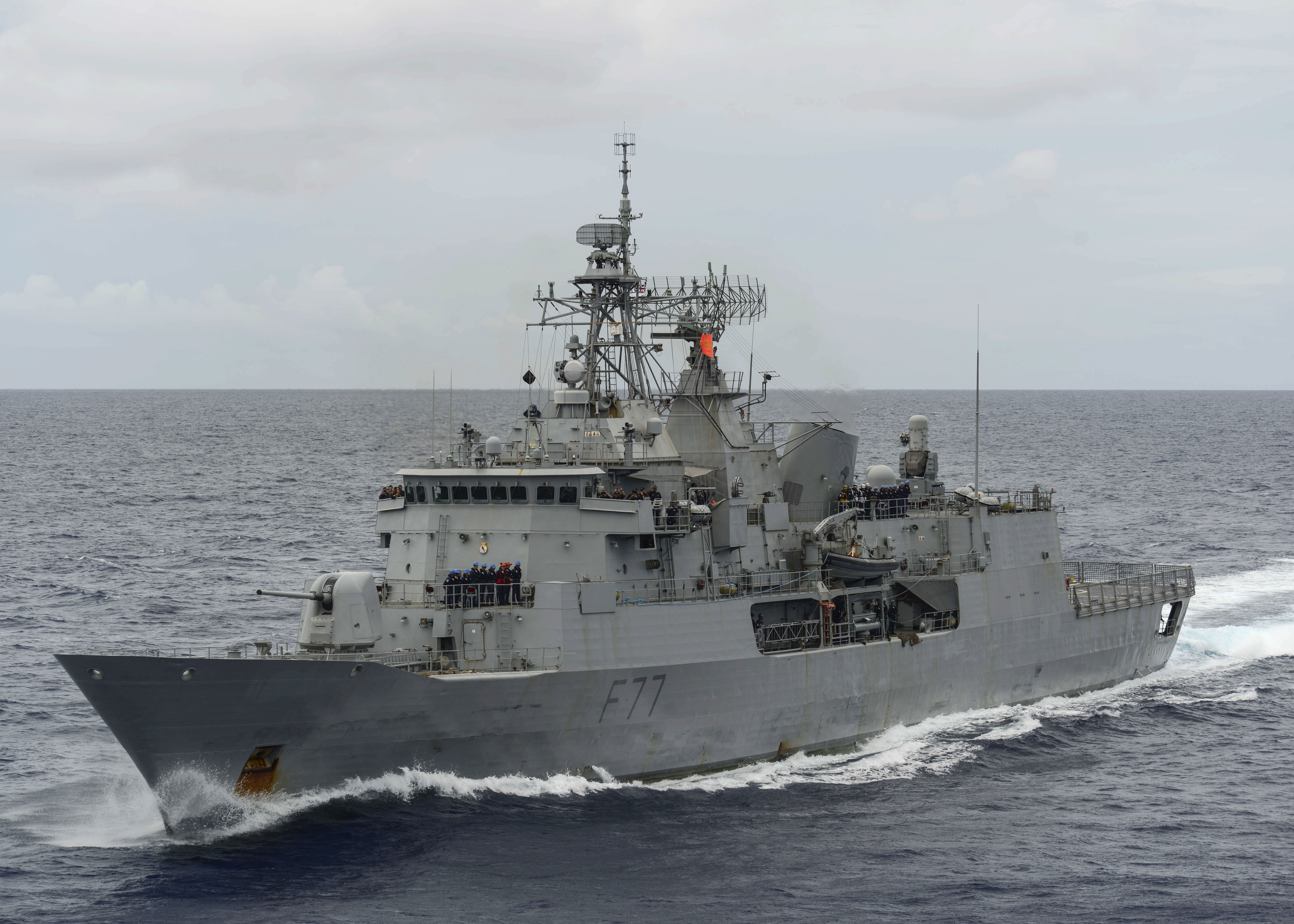
HMNZS Te Kaha in 2017

Due to the late 1960s decision of the UK government to withdraw the Royal Navy from East of Suez in the early 1970s, considerable doubt existed within the RNZN, the government, and community about the continuing relevance, viability, and usefulness of an RNZN force of three to four frigates. The option of the United States Coast Guard's (USCG) Hamilton-class cutters was seriously considered as an alternative to the order of HMNZS Canterbury in 1968, which was approved under the understanding that New Zealand would hold continued access to the UK market after Britain entered the European Economic Community and was affordable only because it was part of a British deal with the Yarrow shipyard to build seven RN, Chilean and RNZN Leanders at less than the cost to save shipyard jobs in Scotland.

Proposals were made during the late 1970s for a modified Hamilton-class cutter with less range, or the RN Type 21 frigate with similar anti-submarine capability to a Leander but with a smaller crew and less air-defence equipment. American Oliver Hazard Perry-class frigates and a similar Dutch combat frigate were also proposed, but all were rejected by the Muldoon government and by the early 1980s a number of retired naval officers and political scientists like Helen Clark and Robert Miles were seriously debating and writing papers and articles suggesting options such as RN OPVs, the Castle-class and the USCG's WMEC Bear class. The navy was interested in some of these ideas, but only for the option proposed by the 1978 Defence Review of acquiring two OPVs to patrol the expanded EEZ and free the Leanders for other uses and for replacement of the inadequate and worn out Lake-class patrol vessels. After the election of the Lange Labour government, thinking on alternatives to frigates for the RNZN had moved towards purpose-built designs rather like the Irish Navy's Eithne patrol corvette, a sort of 1,800-ton high endurance corvette with Leander-like helicopter hangar and pad (Note: The Irish corvettes were mentioned by a number of commentators like Hager and Miles and were one alternative option actually thought ideal in a background interview with Cmdr I. Bradley by Miles in 1983 and some of these ideas were developed in NBR articles by R.Miles in 1983 and in particular 1985) or small Meko 100–140 designs rather different from the Espora-class corvettes built for Argentina. After the nuclear ships crisis and other events, the acquisition of some Anzac frigates was virtually certain, because the key Labour MP Jim Anderton either accepted the Anzac ships as a necessary increased self-defence capability with the securing of a nuclear-free policy or tacitly agreed not to oppose it like Helen Clark.

The new most touted off-the-shelf options in 1986–88 (the Castle and Bear-class vessels) were no longer possible as the Scottish shipbuilders had closed and development of the Bear cutter option into a stretched vessel was effectively impossible after the ANZUS impasse. The New Zealand government's planned acquisition of the Anzac-class frigates was a major point of debate and contention: researcher Peter Greener claims that it "was possibly the most strongly debated defence purchase of the century". In New Zealand, at the time, "frigate" was a dirty word and attempts to make the replacement of the old navy ships more palatable to the public included using euphemisms like "ocean combat ship" and "ocean surveillance vessel". The government's official stance was dedication to maintaining a blue-water navy, primarily in order to defend the nation and contribute to regional security. Despite this, the government was slow to respond to opponents of the project which included peace campaigners, politicians (from both within and outside the Labour Party, and from both ends of the political spectrum), and military personnel. Most of the concern revolved around the cost of purchasing frigate-type ships, along with the idea that four high-capability warships would be too few and too overspecialised to operate in the roles envisioned for the RNZN.

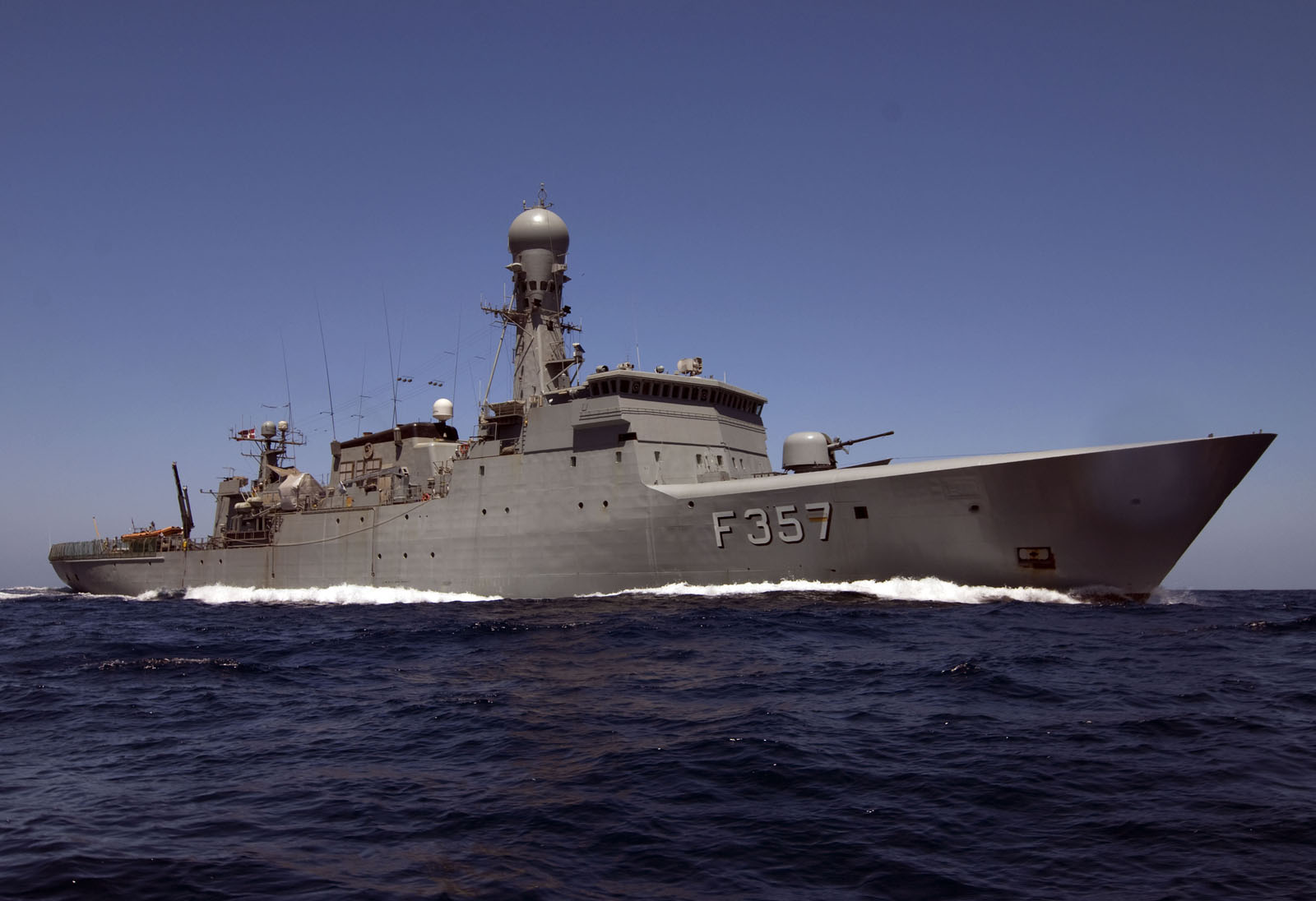
The Danish patrol frigate HDMS Thetis. The Thetis class was one of the alternates proposed during debates on New Zealand's acquisition of the Anzac class.

The primary role foreseen for the RNZN was fisheries protection, particularly following the introduction of a 200-nautical-mile (370 km; 230 mi) exclusive economic zone by the 1982 United Nations Convention on the Law of the Sea; this was thought to require a minimum of six vessels to effectively police. Peace campaigners claimed that the purchase of the Anzacs was a politically motivated decision made under pressure from Australia, which was trying to support its shipbuilding industry, and stated that the Fourth Labour Government was undermining its commitment to reduce the nation's deficit by spending so much on high-tech warships (although figures of $NZ20 billion for purchase and 20 years of operation was misquoted as an upfront lump sum). There were also concerns that by possessing modern warships, New Zealand would be "dragged" back into ANZUS. One proposal suggested to avoid this was that the New Zealand Anzacs be fitted with inferior engines that would reduce the vessels' top speed and make it impossible to operate with United States Navy fleets. However, these changes would have incurred major additional expenses. A recurring alternate proposal was the purchase of the British Castle-class patrol vessel design. Two months after tenders for the project closed, the managing director of Svendborg Skibsværft began to campaign for the construction of the Danish IS-86 patrol vessel (later designated the Thetis-class frigate) for the RNZN. In response to these proposals, the government indicated that it was committing to purchasing Australian ships, and that interoperability with the RAN (which the alternate ship designs were incapable of) was a major element in the decision.

At the time of the August 1989 decision for AMECON to build the MEKO-based frigate, the controversy was still ongoing in New Zealand. David Lange, a major supporter of the Anzac project, had only just resigned from the prime ministership. Despite the Labour Party's national conference rejecting the frigate project a year earlier, the purchase of two Anzacs, with the option to acquire two more, was approved by Prime Minister Geoffrey Palmer's cabinet on 4 September, then a majority of the Labour caucus on 7 September. From the government's perspective, the Anzac project was being seen as a litmus test of New Zealand's commitment to (among other things) relations with Australia and regional defence, particularly after the problems between New Zealand and the United States.

Despite the government signing contracts for the purchase of two Anzacs in November 1989, the project continued to be a bone of contention in New Zealand politics, particularly after the Fourth Labour Government lost the 1990 election to the National Party, which formed the Fourth National Government. In 1992, Minister of Defence Warren Cooper began claiming in several arenas that exercising the option for two more frigates may not be necessary. Following the 1996 election, the National Party retained power, but only in coalition with the New Zealand First party, which opposed the purchase of additional frigates. Other options for replacing the two remaining Leanders were explored, but these were generally more expensive than purchasing the Anzacs. The US Clinton Administration partly discredited the option of a third Anzac by formally offering the RNZN two Oliver Hazard Perry-class frigate shorthulls of 15–17 years age, purportedly armed with SM1 Standard missiles and later 28 F-16 Fighting Falcon aircraft which it had refused to transfer to Pakistan. These offers were made partly because of US concern that Australia needed more regional defence support to conduct a more robust foreign and economic policy in SE Asia. However the F-16 offer, offered the NZ cabinet an option and out and they took it, rather than be immensely unpopular in both Canberra and Washington by rejecting both. In the view of NZ PM Jenny Shipley the Australians had made a good offer, but it was not good enough and there were many alternative ship designs. Internal political opposition, particularly from New Zealand First, prevented the exercising of the contract option for two more ships before it lapsed on 10 November 1997, at which point the government was considering the purchase of a single frigate outside the terms of the original contract. A year later, the idea was still being debated internally although the proposal had been downgraded to buying one of the active Australian Anzacs second-hand which the RAN could then replace by building an additional ship. At this point, the National-New Zealand First coalition had collapsed, and the National Party was only holding on to power by the support of minority parties and independents; support that was likely to be withdrawn if a third frigate was approved. Cabinet rejected the plan, and the issue of replacing the Leander-class frigate Canterbury was deferred.

== Design at launch ==
The Anzac design is derived from Blohm + Voss' MEKO 200 PN (or Vasco da Gama-class) frigate, and is identified by the company as the MEKO 200 ANZ. In addition to capability modifications to meet RAN and RNZN requirements, the ships were redesigned during the development phase to maximise the involvement of Australian and New Zealand industries through the use of locally sourced components: 80% of the materials (by value) was locally sourced, and within this, 20% must come from New Zealand. The Anzacs were designed to German Navy standards, except where Australian or United States standards were specifically requested.

Each frigate has a 3,600-tonne (3,500-long-ton) full load displacement. The ships are 109 metres (357 ft 7 in) long at the waterline, and 118 metres (387 ft 2 in) long overall, with a beam of 14.8 metres (48 ft 7 in), and a draught at full load of 4.35 metres (14 ft 3 in). The hull and superstructure are of all-steel construction, and the ships are fitted with fin stabilisers.

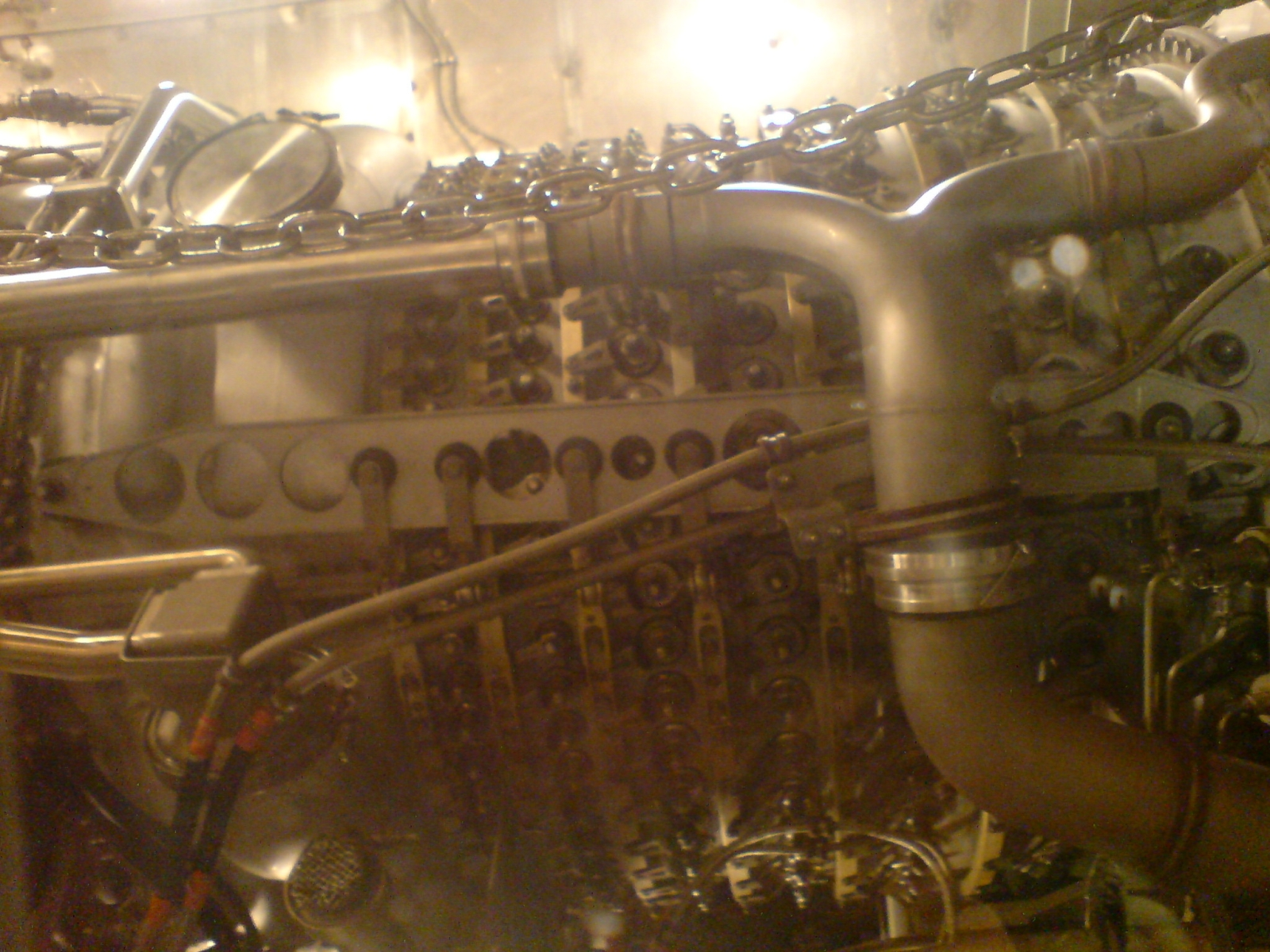
The LM2500-30 gas turbine aboard Te Kaha

The frigates use a combined diesel or gas (CODOG) propulsion machinery layout, with a single, 30,172-horsepower (22,499 kW) General Electric LM2500-30 gas turbine and two 8,840-horsepower (6,590 kW) MTU 12V1163 TB83 diesel engines driving the ship's two controllable-pitch propellers. Maximum speed is 27 knots (50 km/h; 31 mph), and maximum range is over 6,000 nautical miles (11,000 km; 6,900 mi) at 18 knots (33 km/h; 21 mph). The frigates' range is about 50% greater than other MEKO-type frigates, due to an enhanced fuel supply. Originally, two gas turbines were to be fitted; this layout would have provided a top speed of 31.75 knots (58.80 km/h; 36.54 mph). The starboard turbine was cancelled to save costs.

The standard ship's company of an Anzac consists of 22 officers and 141 sailors. Onboard electricity requirements are met by four MTU diesel generators. Each ship can carry up to 29 cubic metres (1,000 cu ft) of dry provisions, 29 cubic metres (1,000 cu ft) of refrigerated provisions, and 54 tonnes (53 long tons; 60 short tons) of fresh water.

=== Armament ===
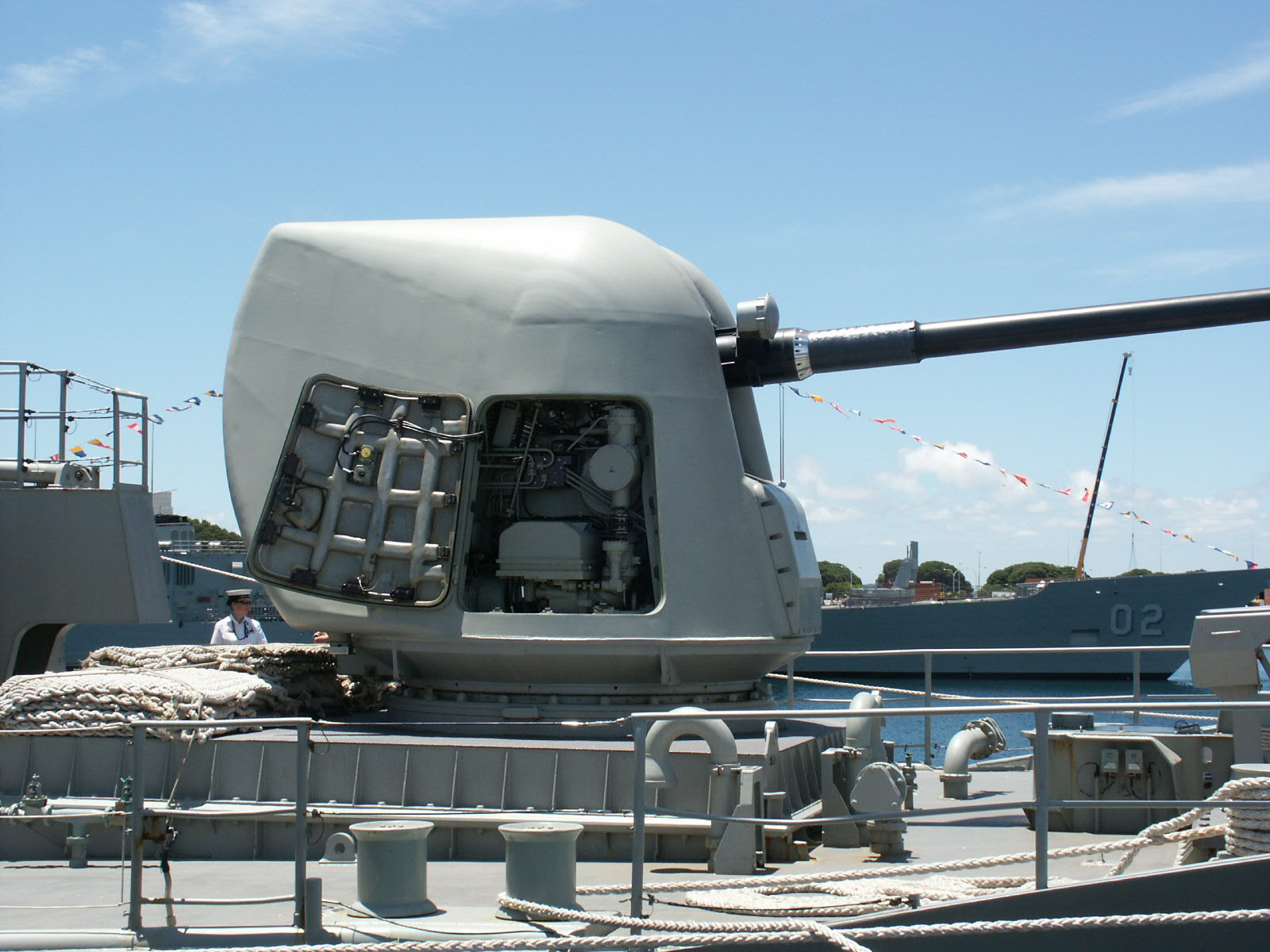
Mark 45 5-inch 54-caliber main gun aboard HMAS Arunta, with side inspection panel open

At the time of construction, the main weapon for the Anzacs was a United Defense 5-inch 54 calibre Mark 45 Mod 2 dual purpose gun. The forward-mounted gun is capable of firing 32-kilogram (71 lb) shells at a rate of 20 rounds per minute, to a distance of 23 kilometres (14 mi). The barrel can elevate to 65 degrees. This was supplemented by a Tactical-length eight-cell Lockheed Martin Mark 41 Mod 5 vertical launch system for RIM-7 Sea Sparrow missiles as a point-defence system. The Sea Sparrow is a semi-active radar homing missile, with a 39-kilogram (86 lb) warhead, a range of 14.6 kilometres (9.1 mi), and a top speed of Mach 2.5. Two 12.7-millimetre (0.50 in) machine guns were fitted for close defence.

A missile-armed helicopter was a key component of the frigates' armament. When construction started, both navies were planning for, but had yet to identify, new helicopters to be operated by the frigates; as an interim measure, the RAN used Sikorsky S-70B-2 Seahawks, while the RNZN embarked Westland Wasps.

Ships were fitted for but not with a close-in weapons system, two quad-canister Harpoon anti-ship missile launchers, and a second Mark 41 launcher. After the ships were completed, both navies fitted Mark 32 three-tube torpedo launchers to their frigates. These were taken from older ships where possible; for example, Te Kaha's launchers came from Southland. The launchers were configured to fire the Mark 46 Mod 5 torpedo, an active/passive homing torpedo with a range of 11 kilometres (6.8 mi) at 40 knots (74 km/h; 46 mph), and a 44-kilogram (97 lb) warhead.

=== Sensors and systems ===
The radar suite includes a Raytheon SPS-49(V)8 ANZ radar for aerial search and long-range surveillance, a Saab 9LV 453 Target Indication Radar for air and surface search, an Atlas Elektronik 9600 ARPA navigational radar, and a second Saab 9LV 453 unit for fire control. All ships were initially fitted with a ThomsonSintra Spherion B hull-mounted bow sonar, for active search and attack operations. From Warramunga onwards, ships were launched with a Petrel Mine and Obstacle Avoidance Sonar system. this was later retrofitted to Anzac. All ships were fitted for but not with a towed-array sonar, with the RAN and RNZN following separate acquisition programs for these. The frigates were also fitted for but not with SATCOM and a Helo datalink.

Countermeasures and electronic warfare equipment fitted at launch included Mark 36 SRBOC launchers, an SLQ-25A towed torpedo decoy, four four-cell Nulka decoy launchers, Racal Thorn modified Sceptre-A electronic support measures (ESM) equipment, and a Telefunken PST-1720 Telegon 10 radar intercept unit. The Anzacs were fitted for but not with offboard active ECM systems. The Sceptre-A equipment was unable to meet the required performance specifications, and Thales UK (which previously acquired Racal Thorn) was contracted in 2001 to replace the units with the Centaur ESM.

A Cossor AIMS Mark XII identification-friend-or-foe system is also installed.

The core of the Anzacs' combat system was built around CelsiusTech's (now Saab) 9LV 453 Mark 3 distributed command and fire-control system.

== Construction ==
On 14 August 1989, AMECON was awarded the tender to build the Blohm + Voss designed frigate. The frigates were to be constructed at the AMECON shipyard in Williamstown, Victoria (formerly Williamstown Naval Dockyard), but the modular design of the frigate allowed sections of the ships to be constructed throughout Australia and New Zealand, with final assembly in Williamstown. Each vessel was made up of six hull modules and six superstructure modules. All of lead ship Anzacs modules were assembled at Williamstown, but for later ships, the superstructure modules were fabricated in Whangārei, and hull modules were built at both Williamstown and Newcastle, New South Wales. Unlike previous shipbuilding contracts, AMECON was contractually obliged to meet only the navy's set commissioning dates for the ships; all other construction deadlines were to be determined at the shipbuilder's discretion.

The second and fourth ships to be built were allocated to the New Zealanders. The third and fifth ships to be produced were earmarked for the RNZN in the event that approval to order two more frigates was given, with two more ships for the RAN to be added at the end of the production run. Project offsets meant that construction costs for the New Zealand ships were about 20% less than the Australian vessels.

Steel cutting for the first ship, Anzac, commenced on 27 March 1992. Work on the first New Zealand ship, HMNZS Te Kaha, began in February 1993. Anzac commissioned into the RAN in May 1996, and Te Kaha into the RNZN in July 1997. In early 2002, the first four ships found to have microscopic cracks in the bilge keel and hull plating. The ships' hulls were repaired and reinforced. Construction of the final vessel, HMAS Perth, began in July 2003, with the vessel commissioning into the RAN in August 2006.

== Modifications and improvements ==
The Anzac-class ships were designed with a minimum standard of offensive and defensive weapons, with other equipment fitted "for but not with". The RAN and RNZN began to plan for upgrades to their frigates before all of the ships entered service; these upgrades were planned and executed on a national basis.

=== Australian modifications ===
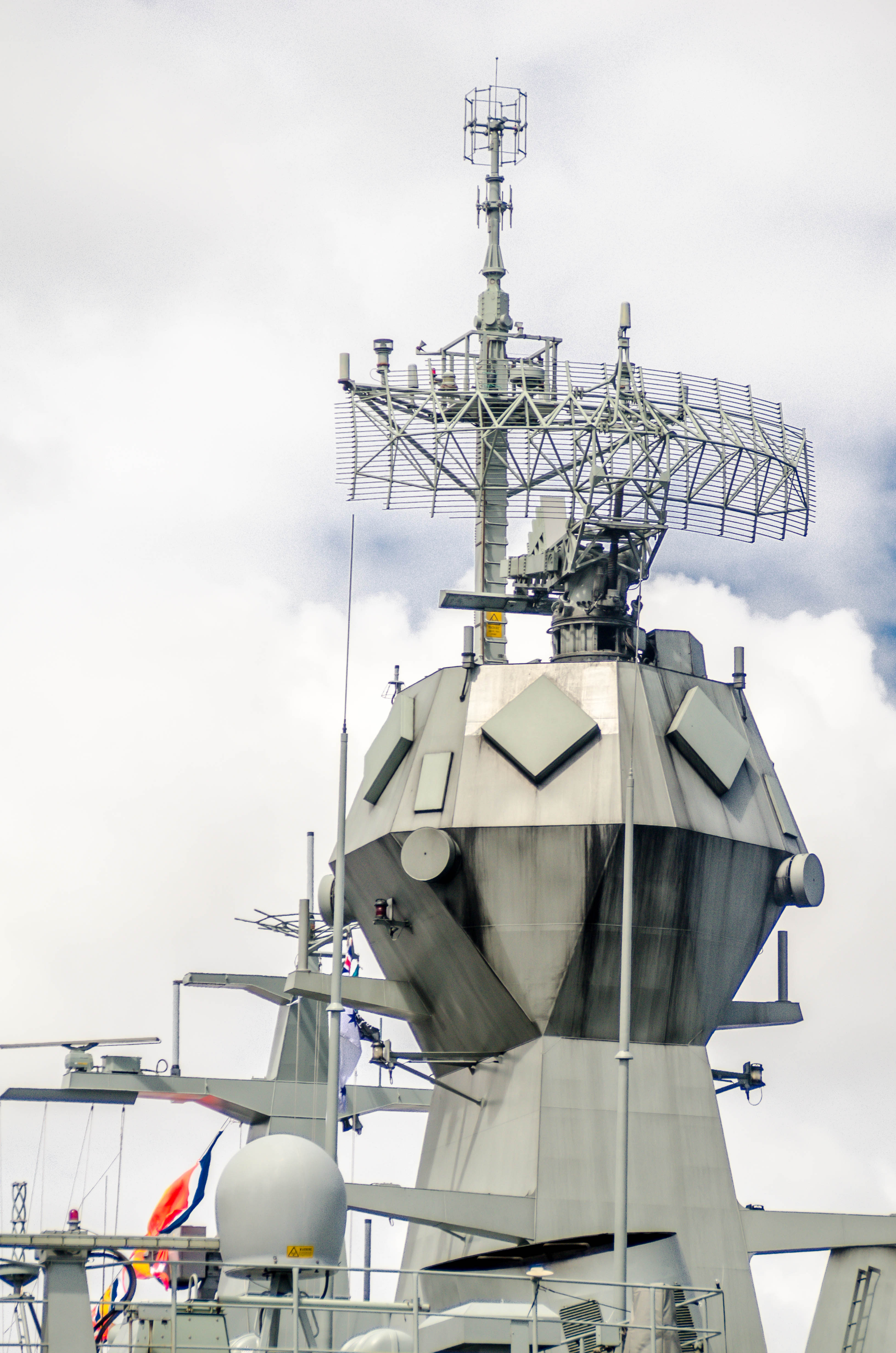
The CEAFAR active electronically scanned array radars fitted to HMAS Perth as part of the ASMD upgrade

The RAN commenced plans to improve their frigates' combat capability in 1996, with the Warfighting Improvement Program (WIP). Upgrades proposed under the WIP included installation of a phased-array radar, a second Mark 41 vertical launch system. The WIP was scrapped near the end of 1999, and plans for a less ambitious anti-ship missile defence (ASMD) upgrade were made. In 2004, Tenix, Saab, and the Department of Defence formed a Private Public Partnership to upgrade the anti-ship missile defence (ASMD) capability of the Anzac class, through the installation of CEA Technologies' CEAFAR and CEAMOUNT active phased array radars, a Vampir NG Infrared Search and Track system, and Sharpeye Navigational Radar Systems. On 18 January 2010, Perth docked at the Australian Marine Complex in Henderson, Western Australia for the ASMD upgrade. Both of the frigate's masts were replaced, and the operations room layout was improved. Additional ballast was required to maintain stability, and the combined weight increase brought the ship's full load displacement to 3,810 tons. After completion in October 2010, Perth was used to test the modifications, with trials completed in July 2011. Approval to upgrade the other seven RAN Anzacs was granted in November 2011, with work on the A$650 million refits to begin in 2012. As of March 2017, all eight ships of the RAN had completed the upgrade.

From Warramunga onwards, the frigates were launched with the ability to carry and fire the RIM-162 Evolved Sea Sparrow Missile (ESSM) as a replacement for the Sea Sparrow missile; these were quad-packed into the Mark 41 launcher for a payload of 32 missiles. Warramunga was the first ship in the world fitted with the ESSM, and the first test firing was conducted aboard on 21 January 2003. The modifications entered operational service aboard three ships in June 2004. A CEA Technologies solid-state continuous wave illuminator was also fitted as part of the ESSM system.

From 2005 onwards, the RAN began fitting the Anzacs and the Adelaides with Harpoon Block II missiles in two quad-tube canister launchers. The Australian Anzacs were fitted for but not with the launchers, but the originally planned location on 02 deck was found to be unsuitable, and the launchers were relocated to 01 deck, in front of the bridge. Around the same time, the RAN began to fit all frigates deploying to the Persian Gulf with two M2HB .50 calibre machine guns in Mini Typhoon mounts, installed on the aft corners of the hangar roof. Two TopLite EO directors are used with the guns.

The Mark 32 torpedo tubes aboard the Australian frigates were originally fitted with American Mark 46 anti-submarine torpedoes, but these were replaced with the French-Italian MU90 Impact torpedo prior to 2008. Toowoomba was the first Australian ship to fire an MU90 torpedo, during a test firing in June 2008, and Stuart performed the first 'warshot' firing of an armed MU90.

The RAN commenced tendering for a helicopter design to replace the Seahawks aboard the Australian Anzacs in 1996, with a contract for 11 Kaman SH-2G Super Seasprite helicopters signed in 1997. In addition to the Anzacs, the acquired helicopter also had to be operable from the class of offshore patrol vessels the RAN was planning to build with the Royal Malaysian Navy (Malaysia later withdrew from the plan, and the RAN acquired the smaller Armidale-class patrol boats, which were not helicopter-equipped), with a second contract to be signed for these at a later date. In order to get the best capability for the cheapest price, the Australian Department of Defence opted to have Kaman acquire 40-year-old SH-2F Seasprite airframes decommissioned by the United States Navy, and fit modern flight systems to the reconditioned airframes. This approach led to major delays, and the helicopters were found to be inoperable in low-visibility conditions. By 2006, ten of the helicopters had been delivered, but none were permitted to fly. The Super Seasprite acquisition was cancelled outright in March 2008. Following the acquisition of the Romeo Seahawk helicopter variant, modifications to the Anzacs began to embark the helicopter.

As part of the ANZAC Mid-life Capability Assurance Programme (AMCAP) upgrade under SEA 1448, Phase 4B, the SPS-49(V)8 was replaced with CEAFAR2-L L band phased array radar, along with replacements of the Cossar Mk XII IFF, Exelis ES-3701 ESM and upgrades to the LESCUT, AN/SLQ-25C torpedo self-defence system, and the Nulka active missile decoy capability.

In 2022, the government announced that the Anzac-class would be armed with the Naval Strike Missile (NSM) to replace the Harpoon missile which would more than double the strike range. In June 2024, the Chief of Navy Vice Admiral Mark Hammond said that some of the Anzac-class had been armed with the NSM.

=== New Zealand modifications ===
As soon as the New Zealand Anzacs entered service, a Phalanx CIWS weapons system, recycled from decommissioning various Leander frigates, was fitted to each new frigate in addition to the Mark 32 torpedo tube sets.

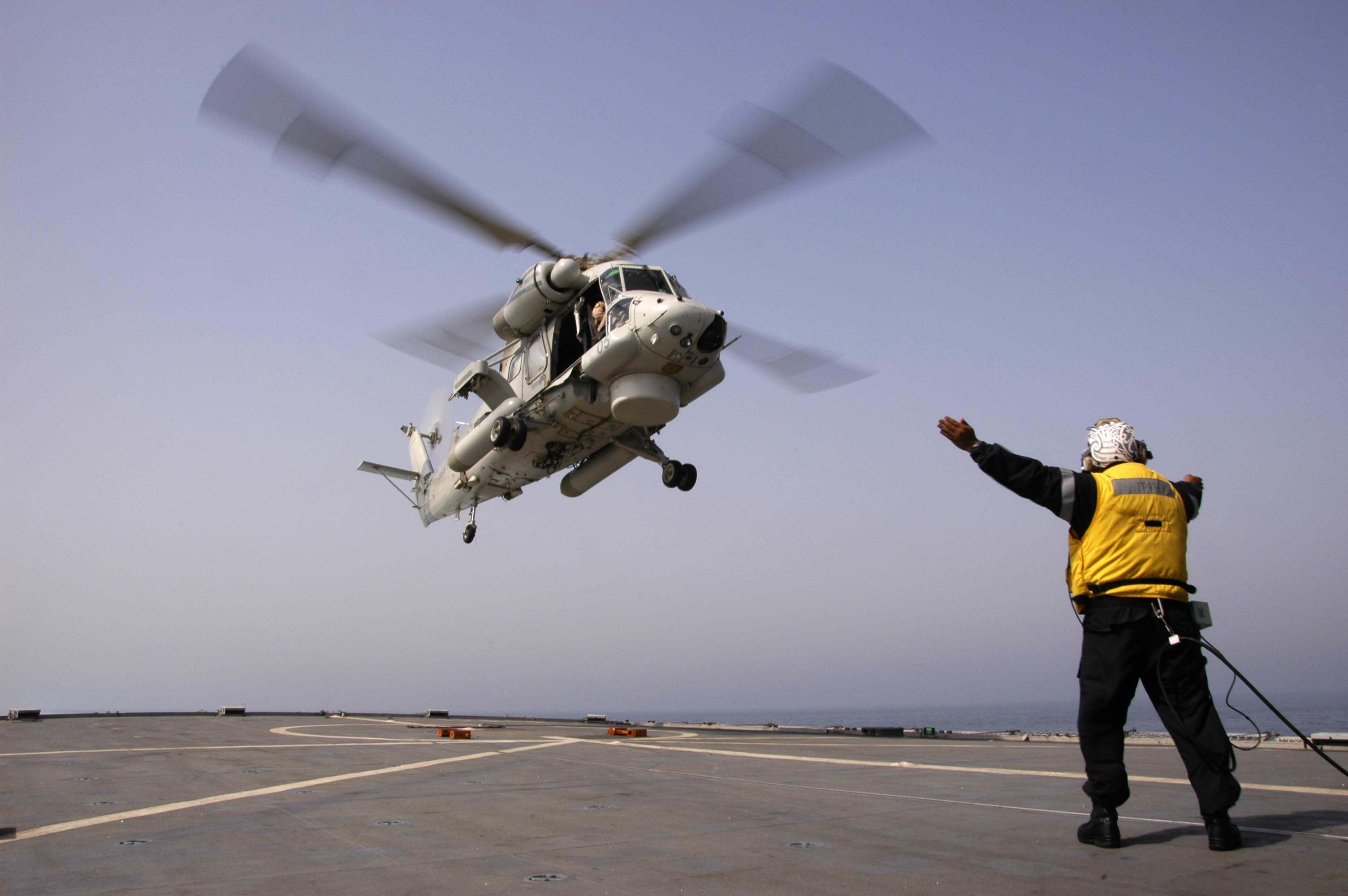
An SH-2G Super Seasprite taking off from Te Mana in 2008

In 1997, the RNZN began steps to acquire five Kaman SH-2G Super Seasprite helicopters for the two frigates. Unlike the Australians, the New Zealand contract specified new-build helicopters. Kaman Aerospace loaned four SH-2F Seasprites to the RNZN while the new helicopters were constructed: the SH-2Fs operated from February 1998 to August 2001, when the first two SH-2Gs were accepted into service.

In 2006, the RNZN fitted two Mini Typhoons for each of its Anzac-class frigates.

In 2007, Te Kaha began undergoing a series of major upgrades as part of the four-stage Platform Systems Upgrade (PSU), planning for which started in 2004. The four areas of modification under the PSU were improved stability and compartment configuration changes, overhaul of the propulsion system, installation of a new Integrated Platform Management System (IPMS), and upgrades to onboard environmental control. The stability upgrades were to accommodate predicted increases in displacement as updated equipment was installed on the ships. As part of the modification, the ships' quarterdecks were partially enclosed, creating space for a gymnasium and improved laundry facilities. Propulsion changes are primarily focused on replacing the TB83 diesel engines with the TB93, providing an additional 1.4 megawatts (1,900 hp) and higher speeds during diesel-only sailing. The IPMS replacement is prompted by the perceived obsolescence of the current system by 2013; as of 2009, tendering for the new system was underway. The environmental control upgrade is intended to improve personnel comfort during deployments to South East Asia, the Middle East, or similar climates, and will use more environmentally friendly products. Each stage of the upgrade is organised to occur simultaneously with ship maintenance dockings, with the first two upgrades being installed during each ship's major maintenance docking in 2009 and 2010 respectively, then the other two upgrades during the next docking in the 2011–2012 period.

A series of austere upgrades were approved on 14 April 2014, at an original contract cost of NZ 446m under the ANZAC Frigate Systems Upgrade (FSU) programme. These include the replacement of the existing combat management system, with a system modelled on that of the RCN Halifax-class frigates awarded to Lockheed Martin, The British Sea Ceptor anti-air missile replaced the Sea Sparrow on 27 May 2014. Other changes included the Norwegian Penguin Mk 2 Mod 7 for the Seasprite helicopters and the fitting of a Sea Sentor Surface Ship Torpedo Defence, or SSTD system, as well as MASS (Multi Ammunition Softkill System). A new inertial navigation positioning system (Northrop Grumman) and navigation radar and SharpEye™ surveillance radars with an Agile Tracker has been fitted. The main radar will be the Thales SMART-S Mk2 3D radar. Other sensors and upgrades include Link 16, laser warning, and IFF. The Lockheed Martin Combat Management System 330 is also installed on the RNZN frigates, as it increases the eyes on each screen, covering lesser sensors and crew.

== Operational history ==
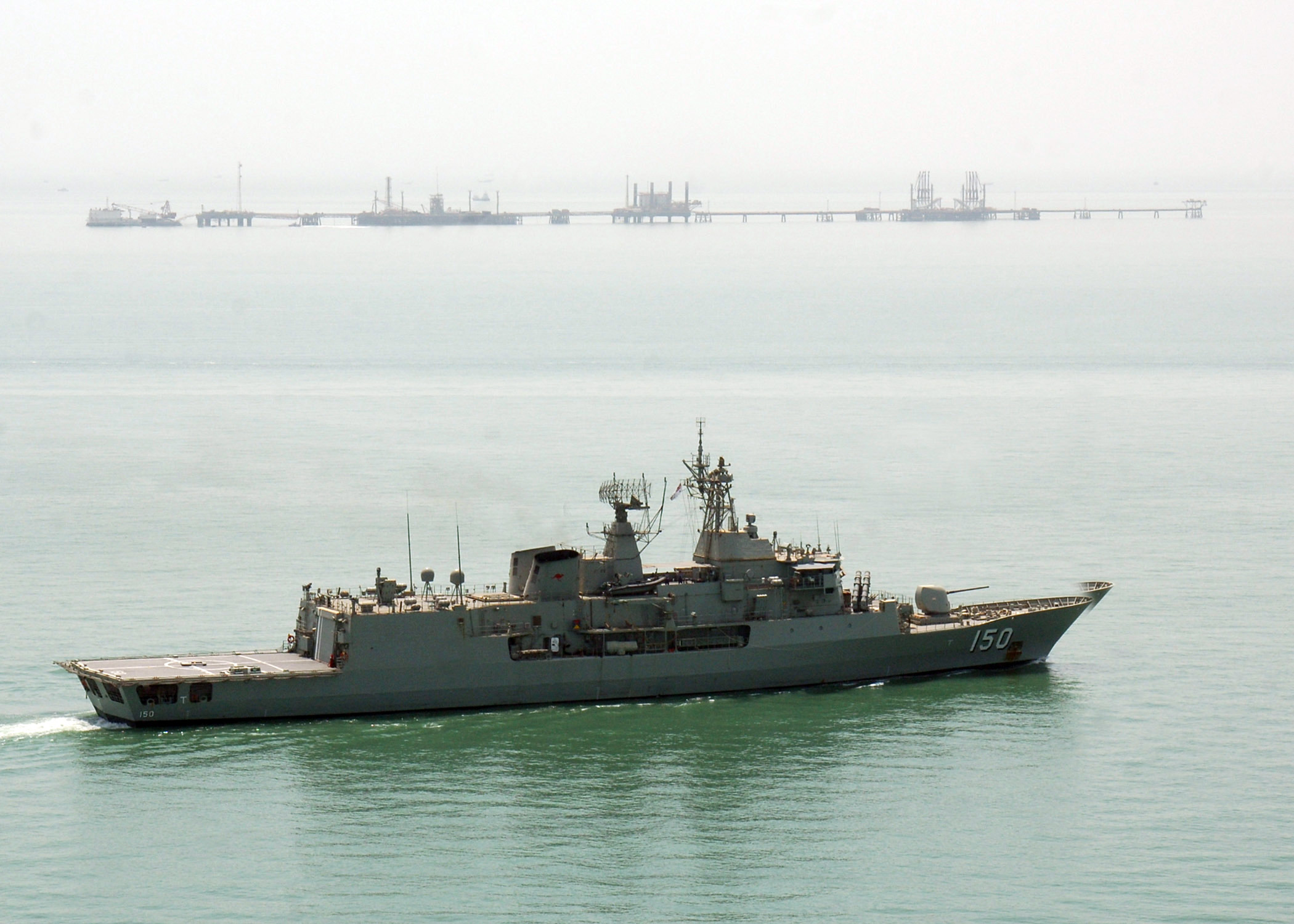
Anzac operating near the Iraqi Khor Al Amaya Oil Terminal in 2007

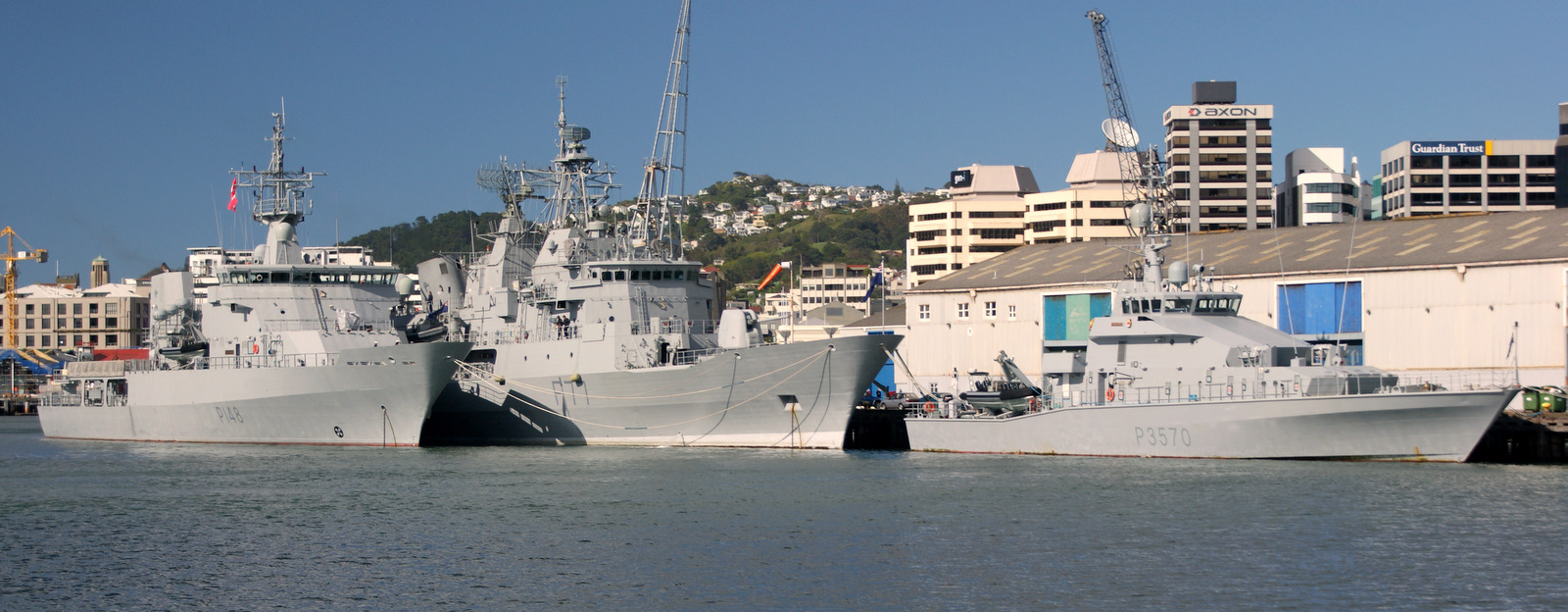
Te Kaha (centre), berthed with the offshore patrol vessel Otago (left) and inshore patrol vessel HMNZS Taupo (right) in Wellington in 2010. The latter two ships were introduced under Project Protector to update the RNZN patrol force, and reduce the requirement for the Anzacs to undertake local patrol duties.

In 1999, Te Kaha pursued Patagonian Toothfish poachers in the Ross Dependency, participated in the INTERFET multinational deployment to East Timor, and operated as part of the Multinational Interception Force in the Persian Gulf in 1999. The New Zealand frigates served periods as guardships at the Solomon Islands capital of Honiara between 2000 and 2001. In 2002, Te Kaha returned to the Persian Gulf, this time as part of Operation Enduring Freedom, after a four-month flag-showing deployment in Asian waters. The frigate was replaced in the Gulf by Te Mana in early 2003.

In March 2003, Anzac provided fire support for Royal Marines during the Battle of Al Faw during the 2003 Invasion of Iraq.

A 2002 review of the RNZN's abilities found that the navy was not meeting its patrol capability requirements; one of the contributing factors was that the New Zealand Anzacs were both too few and overcapable for EEZ patrols, and deploying them in this manner prevented them from more effective use elsewhere. Remedying this was one of the aims of Project Protector, a multi-ship acquisition project which saw three new classes of ship enter RNZN service.

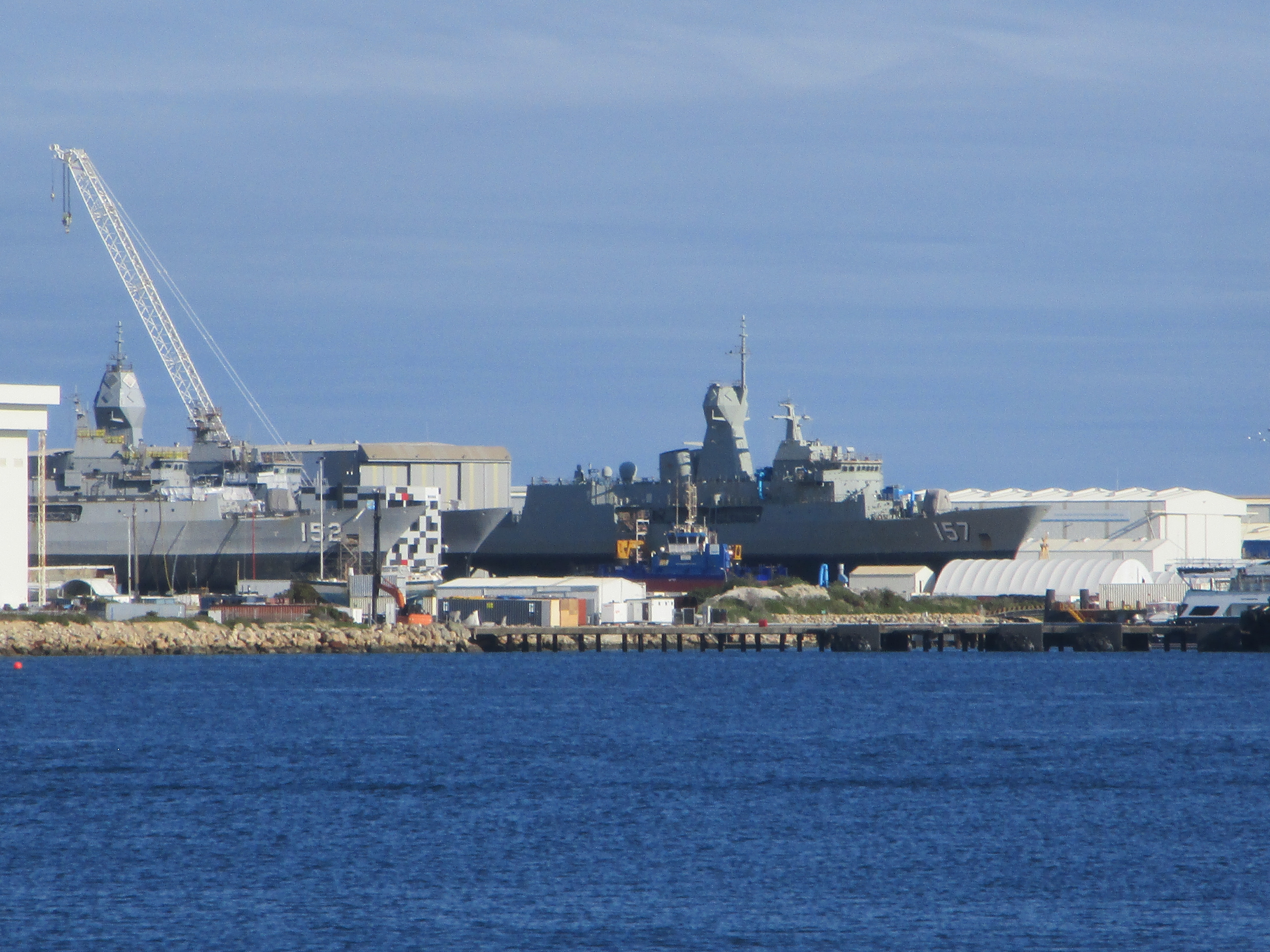
From left to right: Warramunga, Anzac and Perth at the Australian Marine Complex hardstand, September 2019

From 2018, the Anzac-class frigates were undergoing their Midlife Capability Assurance Program (AMCAP) upgrade at the Australian Marine Complex, Henderson, Western Australia, a process scheduled to be completed by 2023. Arunta was the first ship to undergo the upgrade, followed by Anzac and Warramunga.

== Planned replacement ==
The RAN plans to begin removing their Anzacs from service from 2024 onwards. To replace them, there were plans to build Hunter class of new frigates under the SEA 5000 acquisition project. The frigates have been predicted to have a displacement of up to 7,000 tonnes (6,900 long tons; 7,700 short tons), and although they will be primarily oriented towards anti-submarine warfare, they are expected to be capable of also operating against air, sea-surface, and land targets. Originally eight vessels were planned, but by August 2015, the number of planned ships had increased to nine, with an estimated cost of $20 billion. Construction was predicted to commence in 2020. The Abbott government promised that the two-decade construction project will be headquartered in South Australia, with shipbuilding divided between ASC Pty Ltd in South Australia and BAE Systems' Williamstown Dockyard in Victoria. On 18 April 2016, Prime Minister Malcolm Turnbull (Abbott's successor) confirmed that BAE Systems' Type 26 frigate, Fincantieri's FREMM frigate and a re-designed F-100-class frigate designed by Navantia had been shortlisted to replace the ANZAC-class in Australia. The Prime Minister confirmed that any frigate will be built in Adelaide and incorporate an Australian CEA phased array radar. The program is estimated to be worth $35 billion. In June 2018 it was confirmed that BAE Systems's Type 26 frigate had won the SEA5000 competition, with the in-service date for the new vessels being set for 2027.

The New Zealand Defence Capability Plan 2019 states that the RNZN's Anzacs will be replaced in the mid-2030s by "modern surface combatants relevant to New Zealand's prevailing strategic environment".

In February 2024 it was announced that HMAS Anzac was due to decommission in 2024, the first of her class, to free up funding for a future enlargement of the RAN. Her sister ship, Arunta, was scheduled to be decommissioned in 2026 while the remainder of the class would receive no more major upgrades.

In August 2025, the Australian government announced that Mitsubishi Heavy Industries had beaten German rival TKMS in the race to build Australia's new fleet of warships.

== Ships ==
Name	Pennant number	Builder	Laid down	Launched	Commissioned	Decommissioned	Status	Notes
Royal Australian Navy
Anzac	FFH 150	Tenix Defence, Williamstown	5 November 1993	16 September 1994	18 May 1996	18 May 2024	Sold for scrap	AMCAP
Arunta	FFH 151	Tenix Defence, Williamstown	22 July 1995	28 June 1996	12 December 1998		Active in service	AMCAP
Warramunga	FFH 152	Tenix Defence, Williamstown	26 July 1997	23 May 1998	31 March 2001		Active in service	AMCAP
Stuart	FFH 153	Tenix Defence, Williamstown	25 July 1998	17 April 1999	17 August 2002		Active in service	AMCAP
Parramatta	FFH 154	Tenix Defence, Williamstown	24 April 1999	17 June 2000	4 October 2003		Active in service	AMCAP
Ballarat	FFH 155	Tenix Defence, Williamstown	4 August 2000	25 May 2002	26 June 2004		Active in service	AMCAP
Toowoomba	FFH 156	Tenix Defence, Williamstown	26 July 2002	16 May 2003	8 October 2005		Active in service	AMCAP
Perth	FFH 157	Tenix Defence, Williamstown	24 July 2003	20 March 2004	26 August 2006		Active in service	AMCAP
Royal New Zealand Navy
Te Kaha	F77	Tenix Defence, Williamstown	19 September 1994	22 July 1995	22 July 1997		Active in service	NZ FSU completed 2020
Te Mana	F111	Tenix Defence, Williamstown	18 May 1996	10 May 1997	10 December 1999		Active in service	NZ FSU completed 2022

== See also ==
- List of ships of the Royal Australian Navy
- List of ships of the Royal New Zealand Navy
- List of frigate classes in service

=== Equivalent frigates of the same era ===
- Karel Doorman class
- Brandenburg class
- Halifax class
- Type 23
- Vasco da Gama class
- Neustrashimy class
- G class
- Kang Ding class
