= Vietnam War =

1955–1975 war in Southeast Asia

- Part of the Indochina Wars and the Cold War
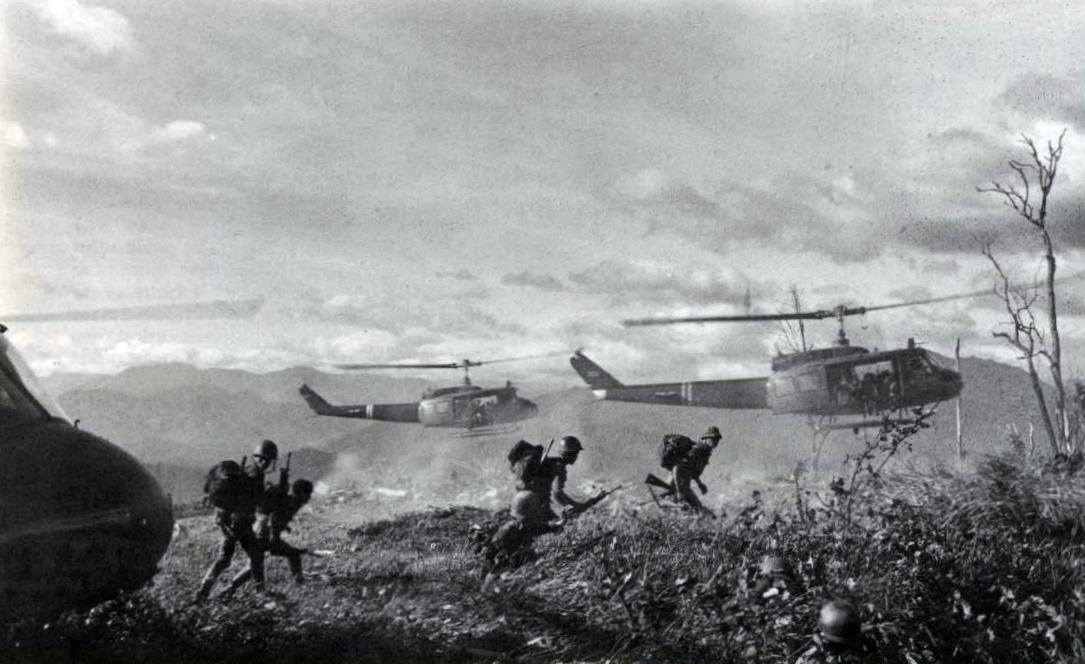
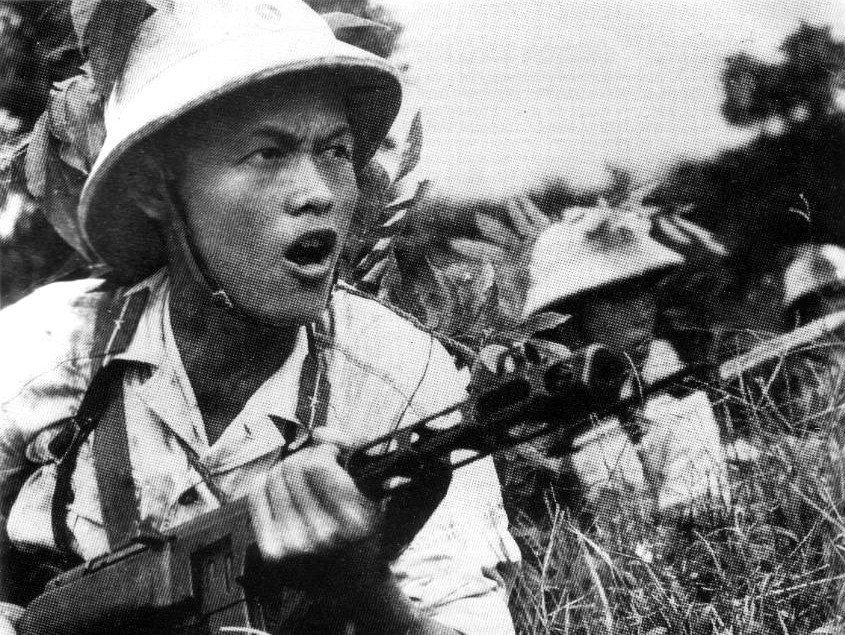
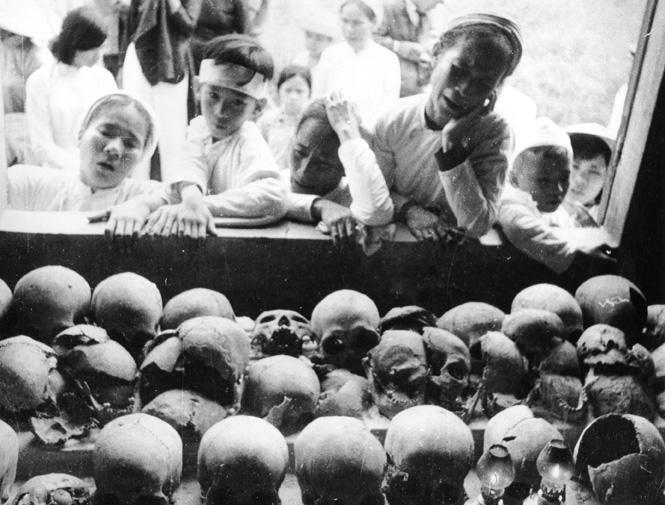
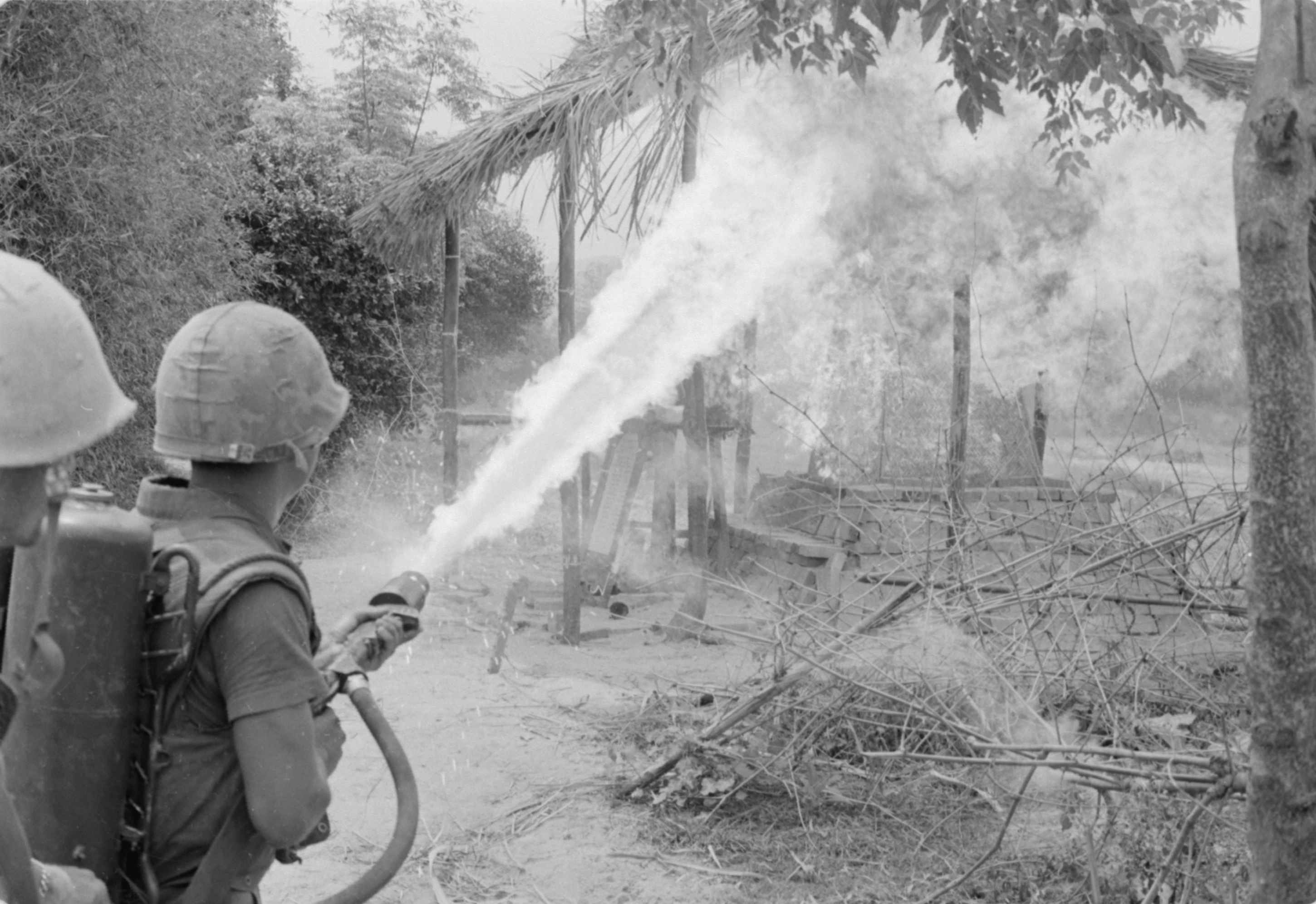
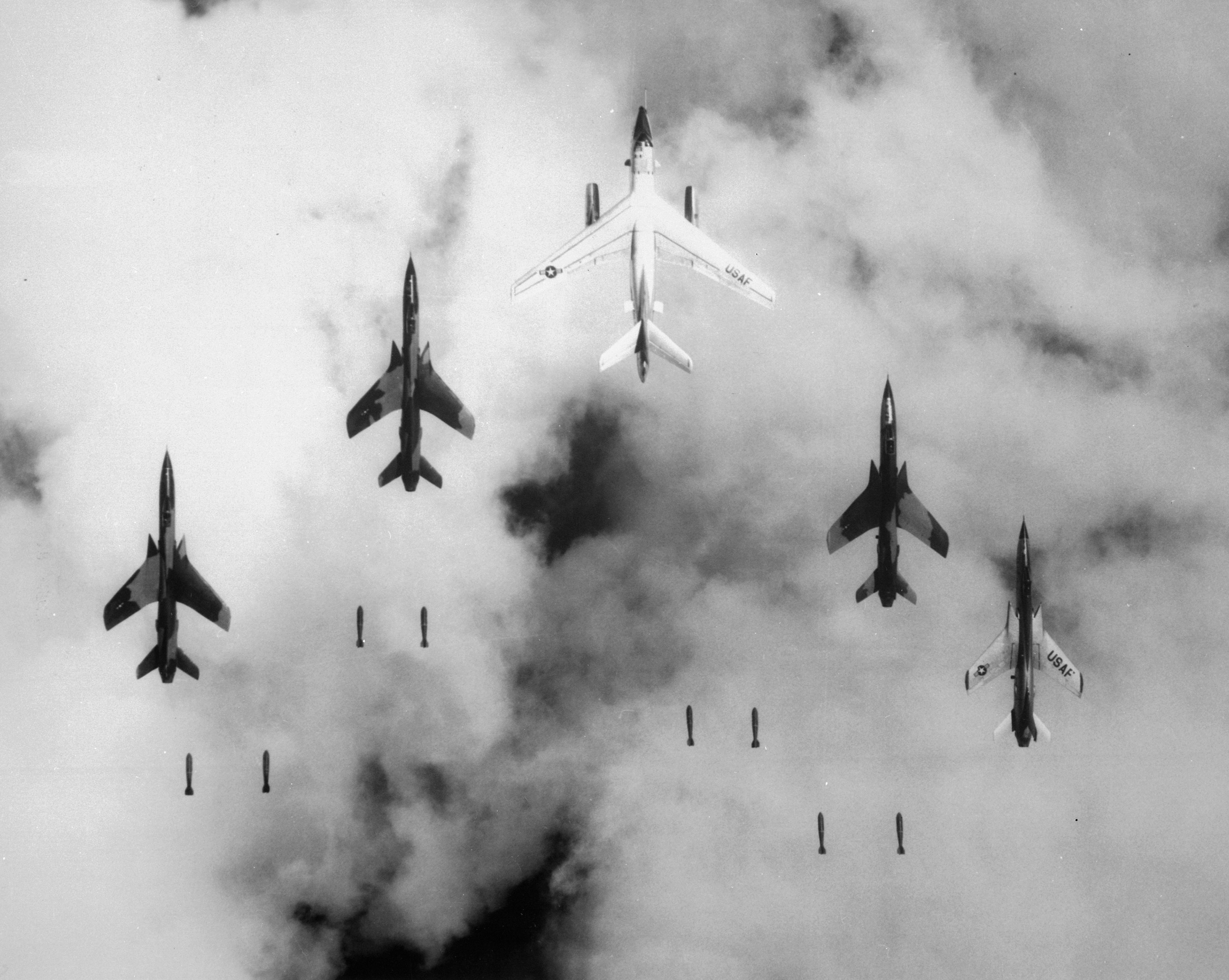
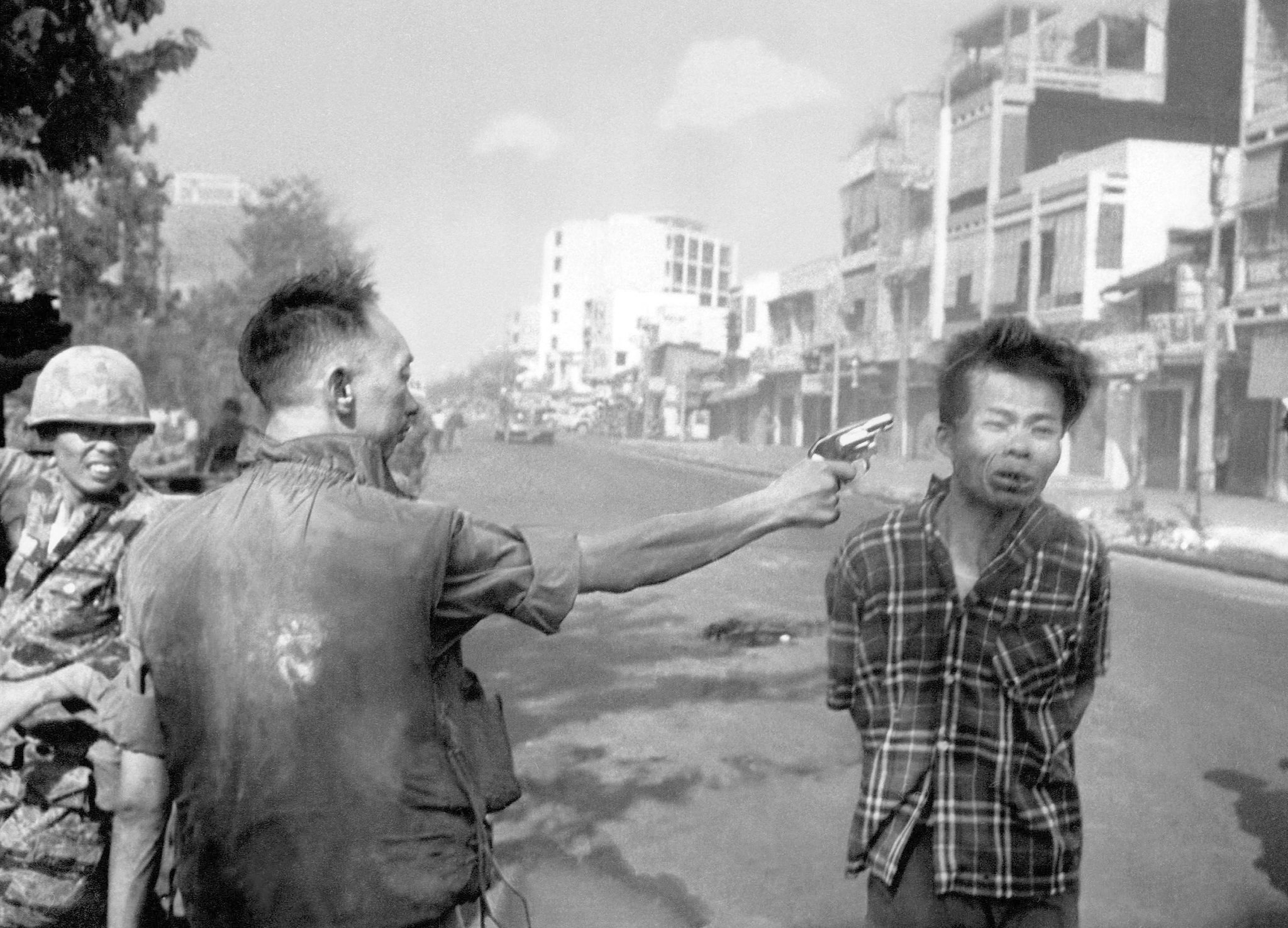
- American Huey helicopters inserting South Vietnamese ARVN troops, 1970 North Vietnamese PAVN troops in action, c. 1966 Recovering remains of Huế massacre victims in 1969 American marines using a flamethrower, 1967 Aerial bombing in Operation Rolling Thunder Saigon Execution: South Vietnamese general summarily executes Viet Cong captain during the Tet Offensive, 1968
Date	circa 1955 (Note: Due to the war's complexity and various actors involved, there is no clear consensus on its exact starting date. In 1998, after a review by the Department of Defense and through the efforts of Richard B. Fitzgibbon's family, the start date according to the US government was officially changed to 1 November 1955, the date when the Military Assistance Advisory Group (MAAG) in Indochina was reorganized into country-specific units and MAAG Vietnam was established. In 2012, US president Barack Obama overturned this chronology by declaring the Vietnam War to have begun on January 12, 1962, marked by the first US combat mission in South Vietnam. Other start dates include when Hanoi authorized Viet Cong forces in South Vietnam to begin a low-level insurgency in December 1956, whereas some view 26 September 1959, when the first battle occurred between the Viet Cong and the South Vietnamese army, as the start date. Other scholars argue that the war began in 1960, 1954, 1950, or even 1945.) – 30 April 1975
Location	South Vietnam; North Vietnam; Laos; Cambodia; South China Sea; Gulf of Thailand
Result	North Vietnamese victory
Territorial changes	Reunification of North Vietnam and South Vietnam into the Socialist Republic of Vietnam in 1976; Chinese control of the Paracel Islands

Belligerents
North Vietnam; Viet Cong and PRG; Pathet Lao; Khmer Rouge; GRUNK; China; Soviet Union; North Korea	South Vietnam; United States; South Korea; Australia; New Zealand; Laos (from 1959); Khmer Republic; Thailand; Philippines; Taiwan

Commanders and leaders
(North Vietnam) Hồ Chí Minh #; (North Vietnam) Lê Duẩn; (North Vietnam) Võ Nguyên Giáp; Nguyễn Chí Thanh #; Trần Văn Trà; Mao Zedong; Leonid Brezhnev; ... and others	(South Vietnam) Ngô Đình Diệm X; (South Vietnam) Nguyễn Văn Thiệu; (South Vietnam) Nguyễn Cao Kỳ; (United States) John F. Kennedy X; (United States) Lyndon B. Johnson; (United States) Richard Nixon; (United States) W. C. Westmoreland; (United States) Creighton Abrams; ... and others

Strength
≈860,000 (1967): North Vietnam: 690,000 (1966, including PAVN and Viet Cong) (Note: According to Hanoi's official history, the Viet Cong was a branch of the People's Army of Vietnam.); Viet Cong: ~200,000 (estimated, 1968); China: 170,000 (1968) 320,000 total; Khmer Rouge: 70,000 (1972); Pathet Lao: 48,000 (1970); Soviet Union: 10,359+; North Korea: 200	≈1,420,000 (1968): South Vietnam: 850,000 (1968) 1,500,000 (1974–1975); United States: 2,709,918 serving in Vietnam total Peak: 543,400 (April 1969); Khmer Republic: 200,000; Laos: 72,000 (Royal Army and Hmong militia); South Korea: 48,000 per year (1965–1973, 320,000 total); Thailand: Peak: 11,570 (1969); Australia: 50,190 total (Peak: 8,300 combat troops); New Zealand: Peak: 552 in 1968; Philippines: 2,061

Casualties and losses
North Vietnam and Viet Cong: 30,000–182,000 civilian dead; 849,018 military dead (per Vietnam; 1/3 non-combat deaths); 666,000–950,765 dead (US estimated 1964–1974) (Note: Upper figure initial estimate, later thought to be inflated by at least 30% (lower figure)); 232,000+ military missing (per Vietnam); 600,000+ military wounded; Khmer Rouge: unknown; (Laos) Pathet Lao: unknown; China: ~1,100 dead and 4,200 wounded; Soviet Union: 16 dead; North Korea: 14 dead; Total military dead: ≈1,100,000; Total missing: ≈300,000; Total military wounded: ≈600,000; (excluding Khmer Rouge and Pathet Lao)	South Vietnam: 195,000–430,000 civilian dead; 313,000 military dead; 1,170,000 military wounded; ≈1,000,000 captured; United States: 58,281 dead (47,434 from combat); 303,644 wounded (Note: The figures of 58,220 and 303,644 for US deaths and wounded come from the Department of Defense Statistical Information Analysis Division (SIAD), Defense Manpower Data Center, as well as from a Department of Veterans fact sheet dated May 2010; the total is 153,303 WIA excluding 150,341 persons not requiring hospital care the CRS (Congressional Research Service) Report for Congress, American War and Military Operations Casualties: Lists and Statistics, dated 26 February 2010, and the book Crucible Vietnam: Memoir of an Infantry Lieutenant. Some other sources give different figures e.g. the 2005/2006 documentary Heart of Darkness: The Vietnam War Chronicles 1945–1975 gives a figure of 58,159 US deaths, and the 2007 book Vietnam Sons gives a figure of 58,226); Laos: 15,000 army dead; Khmer Republic: unknown; South Korea: 5,099 dead; 10,962 wounded; 4 missing; Australia: 526 dead; 3,129 wounded; Thailand: 351 dead; New Zealand: 37 dead; Taiwan: 25 dead; 17 captured; Philippines: 9 dead; 64 wounded; Total military dead: 392,369; Total military wounded: ≈1,340,000; (excluding FANK); Total military captured: ≈1,000,000
- Vietnamese civilian dead: 405,000–2,000,000; Vietnamese total dead: 966,000–3,010,000; Cambodian Civil War dead: 275,000–310,000; Laotian Civil War dead: 20,000–62,000; Non-Indochinese military dead: 65,494; Total dead: 1,326,494–3,447,494
- FULRO fought an insurgency against both South Vietnam and North Vietnam with the Viet Cong, and was supported by Cambodia.

The Vietnam War (c. 1955 – 30 April 1975) was an armed conflict in Vietnam, Laos, and Cambodia fought between North Vietnam (Democratic Republic of Vietnam) and South Vietnam (Republic of Vietnam) and their allies. North Vietnam was supported by China and the Soviet Union, while South Vietnam was supported by the United States and other anti-communist nations. The second of the Indochina wars, the Vietnam War was a postcolonial war of national liberation, a theater in the Cold War, and a civil war, with civil warfare a defining feature from the outset. Direct US military involvement escalated from 1965, peaked in 1969, and subsequently declined until the complete withdrawal of US forces in 1973. The fighting spilled into the Laotian and Cambodian civil wars, which ended with all three countries becoming communist in 1975.

The civil and colonial conflicts in Vietnam became internationalized in 1950. (Note: The Chinese Military Advisory Group was established in April 1950 to provide substantial military assistance to the Democratic Republic of Vietnam. Meanwhile, the US Military Assistance Advisory Group, Indochina was set up in September 1950 to oversee the use and distribution of US military equipment by the French and the State of Vietnam.) After the defeat of the French Union in the First Indochina War, Vietnam's independence was affirmed at the 1954 Geneva Conference, but the country was divided at the 17th parallel under an agreement between the Viet Minh and the French. The communists under Hồ Chí Minh assumed power in North Vietnam, while an anticommunist regime under Ngô Đình Diệm took control of South Vietnam with US backing. The North Vietnamese supplied and eventually directed the Viet Cong (VC), a communist front in the south that intensified a guerrilla war from 1957 onwards. In 1958, North Vietnam invaded Laos, establishing the Ho Chi Minh trail to supply the VC insurgency. By 1961, North Vietnam was covertly sending soldiers of its People's Army of Vietnam (PAVN) to assist the southern insurgents. John F. Kennedy increased US involvement in the early 1960s, including military advisors and aid to the Army of the Republic of Vietnam (ARVN). In 1963, Diệm was killed in a US-backed ARVN military coup, which added to South Vietnam's instability.

Following the Gulf of Tonkin incident in 1964, the US Congress passed a resolution that gave Lyndon B. Johnson authority to increase military presence without declaring war. Johnson launched a bombing campaign of the north and deployed combat troops, dramatically increasing deployment to 184,000 by 1966, and 536,000 by 1969. US forces relied on air supremacy and overwhelming firepower to conduct search and destroy operations in rural areas. Communist forces relied on guerrilla tactics, using the countryside and jungle as concealed base areas. In 1968, the communists under Lê Duẩn launched the Tet Offensive, which was a tactical defeat but contributed to growing American opposition to the war. Johnson's successor, Richard Nixon, began "Vietnamization" from 1969, which saw the conflict fought by an expanded ARVN while US forces withdrew. The 1970 Cambodian coup d'état resulted in a PAVN invasion and US–ARVN counter-invasion, escalating its civil war.

With its ranks degraded by widespread drug abuse and plummeting morale, US troops had mostly withdrawn from Vietnam by 1972. However, American forces provided crucial air support to ARVN against North Vietnam's massive Easter Offensive with the Linebacker Operations. Following the 1973 Paris Peace Accords, the last American forces left. The accords were subsequently violated by North Vietnam, and bloody fighting continued until the 1975 Spring Offensive. Weakened by years of corruption and the economic troubles of South Vietnam's Thiệu regime, Saigon fell to the PAVN, marking the war's end. North and South Vietnam were officially reunified in 1976.

The war exacted an enormous cost: estimates of Vietnamese soldiers and civilians killed range from 970,000 to 3 million. Some 275,000–310,000 Cambodians, 20,000–62,000 Laotians, and 58,220 US service members died. The war was also marked by brutal atrocities, including large-scale massacres (such as Huế and Mỹ Lai), terrorism, indiscriminate bombings, rape, and torture. 20% of South Vietnam's jungle was sprayed with toxic herbicides.

Political repression and flawed economic policies following the war would precipitate the Vietnamese boat people and Indochina refugee crisis, which saw millions leave Indochina, of which about 250,000 perished at sea. The Khmer Rouge carried out the Cambodian genocide, and the Cambodian–Vietnamese War began in 1978. In response, China invaded Vietnam, with border conflicts lasting until 1991. Within the US, the war gave rise to Vietnam syndrome, an aversion to American overseas military involvement, which, with the Watergate scandal, contributed to the crisis of confidence that affected the US throughout the 1970s.

== Names ==
Various names have been applied, though Vietnam War is the most commonly used in English. It has also been called the Second Indochina War, as it spread to Laos and Cambodia, the Vietnam Conflict, and colloquially 'Nam. South Vietnam used terms such as Kháng chiến chống Cộng sản (lit. 'Resistance War against the Communists') and Cuộc chiến bảo vệ tự do (lit. 'Fight to Protect Freedom'). North Vietnam at the time, and official histories produced by the Vietnamese government today, refer to it as Kháng chiến chống Mỹ, cứu nước (lit. 'Resistance War against America to save the nation'), or simply the Resistance War against America. Vietnamese both within the country and overseas occasionally refer to it as Chiến tranh Việt Nam, the Vietnam War.

== Background ==
Vietnam had been under French control as part of French Indochina since the 1880s. Vietnamese independence movements, such as the Vietnamese Nationalist Party, faced suppression despite growing public support for diverse reformist and revolutionary nationalist causes. Nguyen Sinh Cung established the Indochinese Communist Party (ICP) in 1930; the Marxist–Leninist party aimed to overthrow French rule and establish a communist state.

Fractures between nationalists and communists emerged in the late 1920s, as the two groups differed in their visions for postcolonial Vietnam: republicanism for the revolutionary nationalists, and proletarian internationalism for the communists. The communists' radical push for centralized control led to a prolonged civil conflict marked by the suppression of rival nationalists, with the ICP largely responsible for initiating systemic Vietnamese-on-Vietnamese violence.

=== Japanese occupation of Indochina ===
In September 1940, Japan invaded French Indochina, following France's capitulation to Nazi Germany. By 1941, Japan had gained full military access across Indochina and established a dual colonial rule that preserved Vichy French administration while facilitating Japanese military operations. Cung, now known as Ho Chi Minh, returned from exile to establish the anti-Japanese Viet Minh movement. During the last months of the war in 1945, the US Office of Strategic Services (O.S.S.) provided the Viet Minh with training and weapons to develop local intelligence networks against Japanese forces.

In March 1945, Japan, losing the war, overthrew the French government in Indochina, established the Empire of Vietnam, and maintained Emperor Bảo Đại as a figurehead. Nationalist sentiment, intensified during World War II, helped pave the way for the communist-led Viet Minh, themselves cloaked in nationalism. Following the surrender of Japan, they launched the August Revolution, overthrowing the Nguyễn dynasty and seizing weapons from the Japanese. On 2 September, Ho Chi Minh declared the independence of the Democratic Republic of Vietnam (DRV). At the same time, following Allied decisions, British forces were deployed to Indochina to oversee the Japanese surrender south of the 16th parallel, while Chinese Nationalist troops did so in the north. On September 23, with British support, French forces overthrew the Viet Minh administration in Saigon and sought to reassert French control over southern Indochina.

=== First Indochina War ===
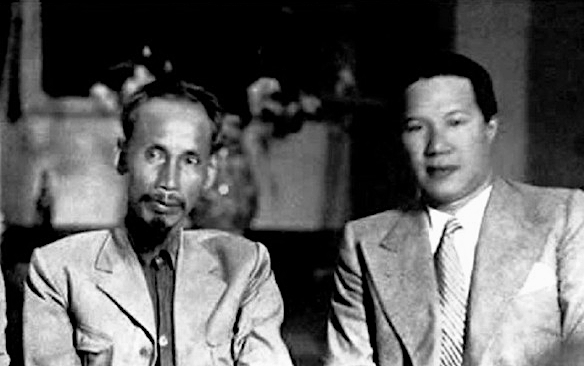
Bảo Đại (right) as "supreme advisor" to the DRV government led by president Ho Chi Minh (left), September 1945

Beginning in August 1945, the Viet Minh sought to consolidate power by terrorizing and purging rival Vietnamese nationalist groups and Trotskyist activists. In 1946, the Franco-Chinese and Ho–Sainteny Agreements facilitated a coexistence between the DRV and French that strengthened the Viet Minh while undermining the nationalists. That summer, the Viet Minh colluded with French forces to eliminate nationalists.

With most of the nationalist partisans defeated, and negotiations broken down, tensions between the Viet Minh and French authorities erupted into full-scale war in December 1946. Surviving nationalist partisans and politico-religious groups rallied behind the exiled Bảo Đại to reopen negotiations with France to establish the State of Vietnam in opposition to communist domination. Adhering to Marxist–Leninist principles, the Viet Minh tightened their control through a series of radical campaigns, provoking disillusionment and growing defections.

==== Internationalization of war ====
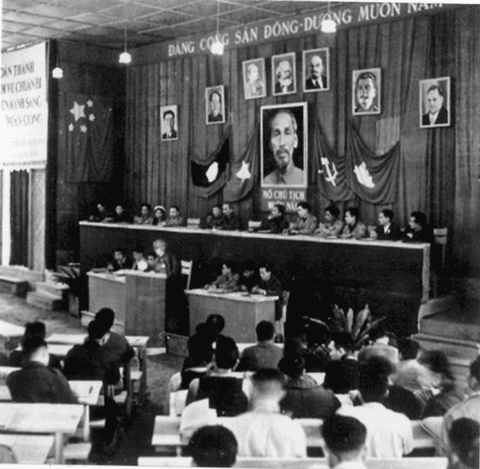
Second Congress of the ICP, 1951

The Chinese communist victory of 1949 transformed the nature of the Indochina War. Having long embraced a "two-camp" worldview and regarded the US as a leading enemy of world revolution, the ICP worked to bring its government into the socialist camp. In January 1950, the People's Republic of China became the first state to recognize the Democratic Republic of Vietnam and persuaded the Soviet Union to do the same. In line with the anticommunist Truman Doctrine, the US and other Western Bloc countries recognized the French-associated State of Vietnam, based in Saigon, as the legitimate government. The civil war and colonial war in Indochina became internationalized and increasingly intertwined with the global Cold War.

In April 1950, the Chinese leadership formed the Chinese Military Advisory Group (CMAG), marking the beginning of substantial Chinese support for the Viet Minh. Chinese weapons, expertise, and laborers transformed the Viet Minh from a guerrilla force into an army. Within the US, the Red Scare and McCarthyism fostered public opposition to communism. The outbreak of the Korean War in June 1950 convinced Washington policymakers that the war in Indochina was another example of communist expansionism. In September, the US created the Military Assistance Advisory Group (MAAG) to screen French aid requests, advise on strategy, and train Vietnamese soldiers. By 1954, the US had spent $1 billion in support of the French effort, shouldering 80% of the war costs.

==== Battle of Dien Bien Phu ====
In late 1953, the CMAG and the Viet Minh planned operations in northwestern Vietnam around Dien Bien Phu near the Laotian border. During the decisive Battle of Dien Bien Phu in 1954, Viet Minh forces encircled the French, using heavy artillery and anti-aircraft batteries to bombard the garrison. France and the US discussed the use of tactical nuclear weapons, though how seriously this was considered is unclear.

In May 1954, the French garrison at Dien Bien Phu surrendered. At the Geneva Conference, they negotiated a ceasefire with the Viet Minh, and the independence of Cambodia, Laos, and Vietnam was affirmed, with Vietnam placed under a temporary North–South division.

== Transition period ==
Between 1953 and 1956, the DRV government instituted agrarian reforms, including rent reduction and land reform, which resulted in political oppression. Witnesses suggested about one execution per 160 village residents, totaling around 100,000 executions. As the campaign was mainly in the Red River Delta, 50,000 executions became accepted by scholars. Documents from Hungarian diplomats suggest that executions were lower, though likely greater than 13,500. The overall death toll was higher when accounting for deaths from torture, imprisonment, isolation, and suicides. In 1956, leaders in Hanoi admitted to excesses and restored much of the land to the original owners.

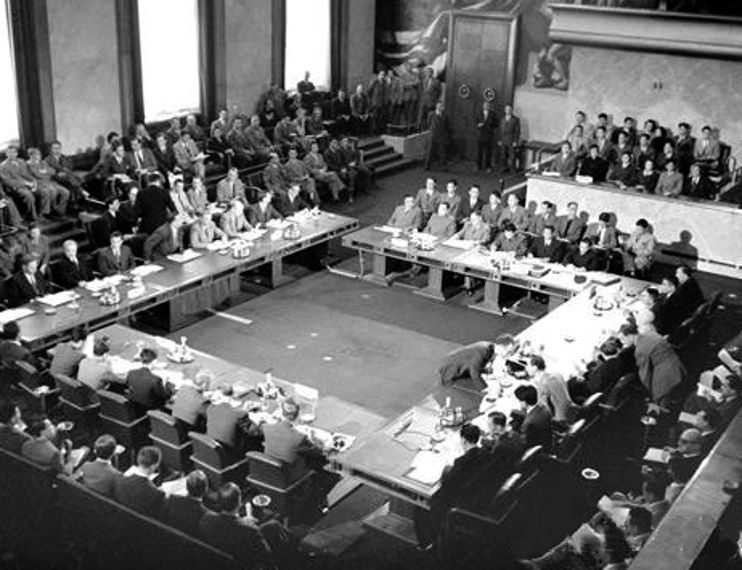
The 1954 Geneva Conference

At the Geneva Conference, the French and the communists came to see the division of Vietnam into two halves as a necessary solution for reaching a negotiated settlement. The Soviets and Chinese pressured Ho Chi Minh to accept the 17th parallel demarcation line, arguing that he could win the election in a couple of years.

The United States and the State of Vietnam objected to the division of Vietnam as a solution. The US countered with the "American Plan", with the support of the State of Vietnam and the United Kingdom. It provided for unification elections under United Nations supervision, but was rejected by the Soviets. The Diệm government called for UN-supervised elections but rejected those proposed by the Viet Minh, believing they would not be free. Neither the US, nor the State of Vietnam, signed anything at the Geneva Conference.

The Geneva Accords of July 1954 brought a flawed peace. Signed between the French and the Viet Minh, the accords ended the war between French and communist forces, but it did not resolve the conflict between the two internationally recognized Vietnamese regimes, which were temporarily partitioned at the 17th parallel.

Throughout the 300-day relocation period, up to one million Northerners moved South, including at least 500,000 Catholics, approximately 200,000 Buddhists, and tens of thousands from ethnic minorities. Allen Dulles, director of the Central Intelligence Agency, authorized a psychological campaign that exaggerated anti-Catholic sentiment among the Viet Minh and circulated materials falsely attributed to them. The CIA's efforts played a minimal role, as Catholic migrants were driven primarily by their own convictions and circumstances rather than external psyops.

USS Bayfield offloads North Vietnamese refugees in Saigon

Condemning both the communists and the French colonialists for the partition of Vietnam, Northern émigrés became an important force in articulating anticommunist discourse in South Vietnam. Meanwhile, over 100,000 Viet Minh fighters moved North for "regroupment". The Viet Minh left roughly 5,000 to 10,000 cadres in the South as a base for insurgency. The last French soldiers left South Vietnam in 1956, and China withdrew from North Vietnam.

Eisenhower speculated that up to 80% of voters would have voted for Hồ over Bảo Đại in a 1954 election, emphasizing Bảo Đại's shortcomings as a leader. The Pentagon Papers suggested that Diệm would have fared better than Bảo Đại, with support for Hồ very likely falling well below 80% by 1956. In 1957, independent observers from the International Control Commission stated that fair elections were impossible, reporting that neither South nor North had honored the armistice agreement.

From April to June 1955, Diệm eliminated political opposition in the south by launching operations against 'sectarian' armed groups: the Cao Đài, the Hòa Hảo, and the organized crime group Bình Xuyên, which was allied with communist party secret police. The group was defeated in April following a battle in Saigon. As broad opposition to his harsh tactics mounted, Diệm sought to blame the communists.

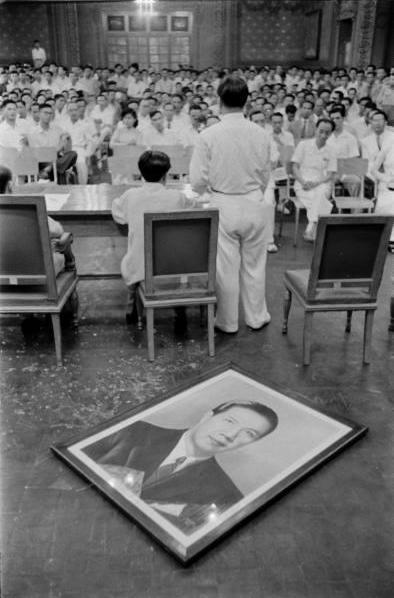
Anti-Bảo Đại revolutionists of the State of Vietnam at city hall, Saigon, May 1955

In a referendum on the future of the State of Vietnam in October 1955, Diệm rigged the polls and was subsequently credited with 98% of the popular vote. He declared South Vietnam the Republic of Vietnam, with him as president. Likewise, Ho Chi Minh and other communists were reported to have received 99% of the vote in North Vietnamese elections.

Political and socioeconomic discontent after land reform and Vietnam's partition led the Vietnamese Workers' Party to undertake the 'correction of errors' in North Vietnam. Inspired by perceived reformist tendencies in Moscow and Beijing, intellectuals in Hanoi launched the unauthorized periodicals Nhân văn and Giai phẩm in 1956. The Party leadership moved to suppress the movement, as it did to the Quỳnh Lưu uprising.

The domino theory, which argued that if a country fell to communism, surrounding countries would follow, was first proposed by the Eisenhower administration; it was supported by John F. Kennedy, then a senator.

== Diệm era, 1954–63 ==
=== Rule ===
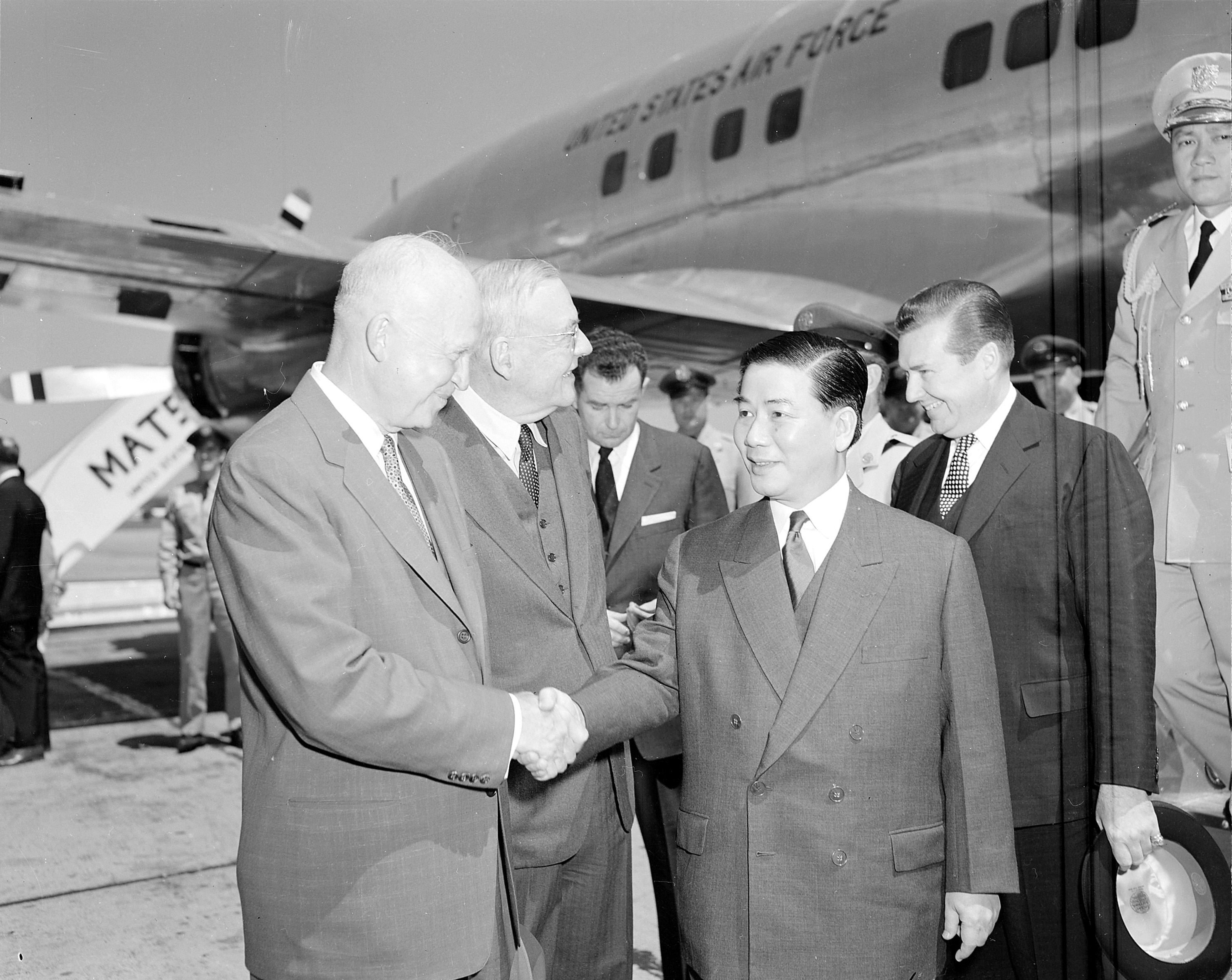
President Dwight D. Eisenhower and Secretary of State John Foster Dulles greet President Ngô Đình Diệm of South Vietnam in Washington, 8 May 1957

By virtue of his staunch anticommunism and anticolonialism, Ngô Đình Diệm, an ardent nationalist and devout Catholic, rallied backing from people of varied regional and religious backgrounds, including many Đại Việt partisans and Hòa Hảo, Cao Đài, and Buddhist adherents. Diệm's achievement in transforming the weak South Vietnam into a centralized republic, however, did not guarantee lasting success. His authoritarian tendencies and suppression of alternative views provoked resentment and opposition to his government during the communist insurgency.

In July 1955, Diệm launched the loosely-defined "Denounce the Communists" campaign with the help of defectors from the Viet Minh; one of its aims was to uncover and arrest communist cadres left behind in the South. In 1956, Diệm instituted the death penalty against activity deemed communist. The North Vietnamese government claimed that over 65,000 people were imprisoned and 2,148 were killed in South Vietnam by November 1957. By 1959, 40,000 political prisoners were jailed.

=== Insurgency in the South, 1954–60 ===
At least 50,000 Communist Party members and soldiers with hidden weapon caches were deliberately left in the South following the Geneva Accords in 1954. Between 1954 and 1957, the Diệm government succeeded in preventing large-scale unrest in the countryside. In April 1957, insurgents launched an assassination campaign, referred to as "extermination of traitors". 17 people were killed in the Châu Đốc massacre at a bar in July. By early 1959, Diệm had come to regard the violence as an organized campaign and implemented Law 10/59, which made political violence punishable by death. There had been division among former Viet Minh, whose main goal was to hold elections promised in the Geneva Accords, leading to activities separate from the other communists and anti-GVN (Government of the Republic of Vietnam) activists. Douglas Pike estimated that insurgents carried out 2,000 abductions, and 1,700 assassinations of officials, village chiefs, hospital workers and teachers from 1957 to 1960. Violence between insurgents and government forces increased from 180 clashes in January 1960, to 545 in September.

==== North Vietnamese involvement ====
The Vietnamese Workers' Party (VWP), the sole ruling party of the DRV, publicly resurfaced in February 1951, succeeding the ICP, which had formally dissolved itself but continued to operate underground. In March 1956, Lê Duẩn, the southern communist leader, presented a plan to revive the insurgency entitled "The Road to the South", to the Politburo of the VWP in Hanoi. However, as both China and the Soviet Union opposed armed confrontation, his plan was rejected. Despite this, the North Vietnamese leadership approved tentative measures to revive southern insurgency in December. Communist forces were under a single command structure set up in 1958. In May 1958, North Vietnamese forces seized the transportation hub at Tchepone in Southern Laos near the demilitarized zone, between North and South Vietnam.

The VWP approved a "people's war" on the South in January 1959, and, in May, Group 559 was established to upgrade the Ho Chi Minh trail, then a six-month mountain trek through Laos. On 28 July, North Vietnamese and Pathet Lao forces invaded Laos, fighting the Royal Lao Army along the border. About 500 of the "regroupees" of 1954 were sent south on the trail during its first year of operation. The first arms delivery was completed in August 1959.

At the Third Party Congress in September 1960, VWP leaders authorized the creation of the National Liberation Front of South Vietnam (NLF) while concealing their control over the organization. The NLF, formed in the borderlands of Tây Ninh, called on all anti-GVN insurgents, including non-communists, to fight under its banner, and its activities were directed through COSVN. It called for the withdrawal of American military personnel, the dissolution of the National Assembly, and the establishment of a non-aligned foreign policy, among others. Identities of the leaders were often kept secret. The Central Office for South Vietnam (COSVN), the VWP headquarters in the South, ordered a coordinated uprising across South Vietnam.

== Escalations of the early 1960s ==
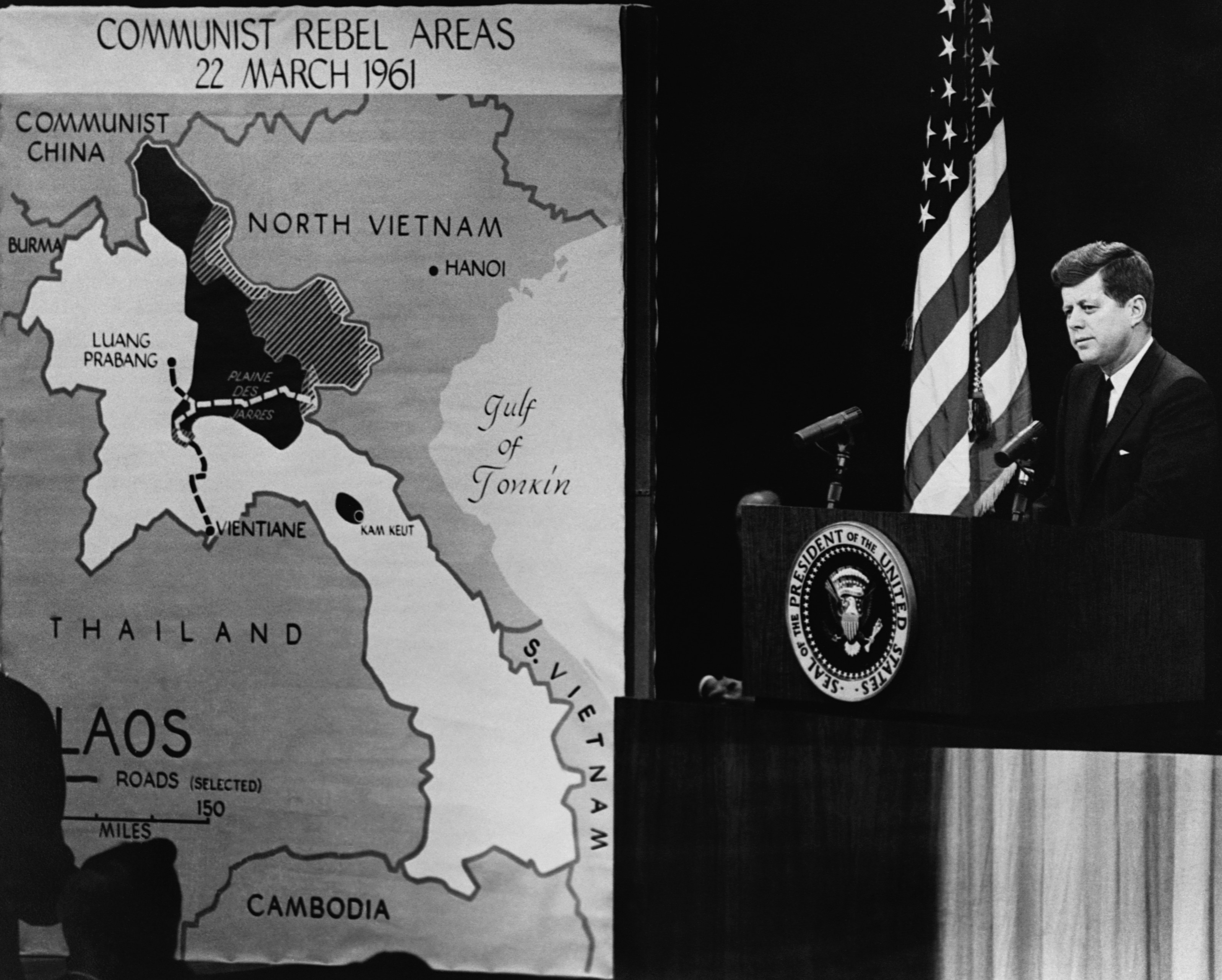
President Kennedy's news conference of 23 March 1961

In the 1960 United States presidential election, John F. Kennedy defeated Richard Nixon. Although Eisenhower warned Kennedy about Laos and Vietnam, Europe and Latin America "loomed larger than Asia on his sights".

Kennedy upheld Truman and Eisenhower's Cold War policies. In 1961, the US had 50,000 troops based in South Korea, and Kennedy faced four crisis situations: the failure of the Bay of Pigs Invasion he had approved in April, settlement negotiations between the Royal Government of Laos and the communist Pathet Lao in May, construction of the Berlin Wall in August, and the Cuban Missile Crisis in October. Kennedy believed another failure to stop communist expansion would irreparably damage US credibility. He was determined to prevent a communist victory in Vietnam. He told The New York Times after the Vienna Summit, "Now we have a problem making our power credible and Vietnam looks like the place."

Kennedy's policy assumed that South Vietnamese forces themselves had to defeat the guerrillas. He opposed deploying American combat troops, believing this would bring adverse political and long-term military consequences. The quality of the South Vietnamese military, however, remained questionable.

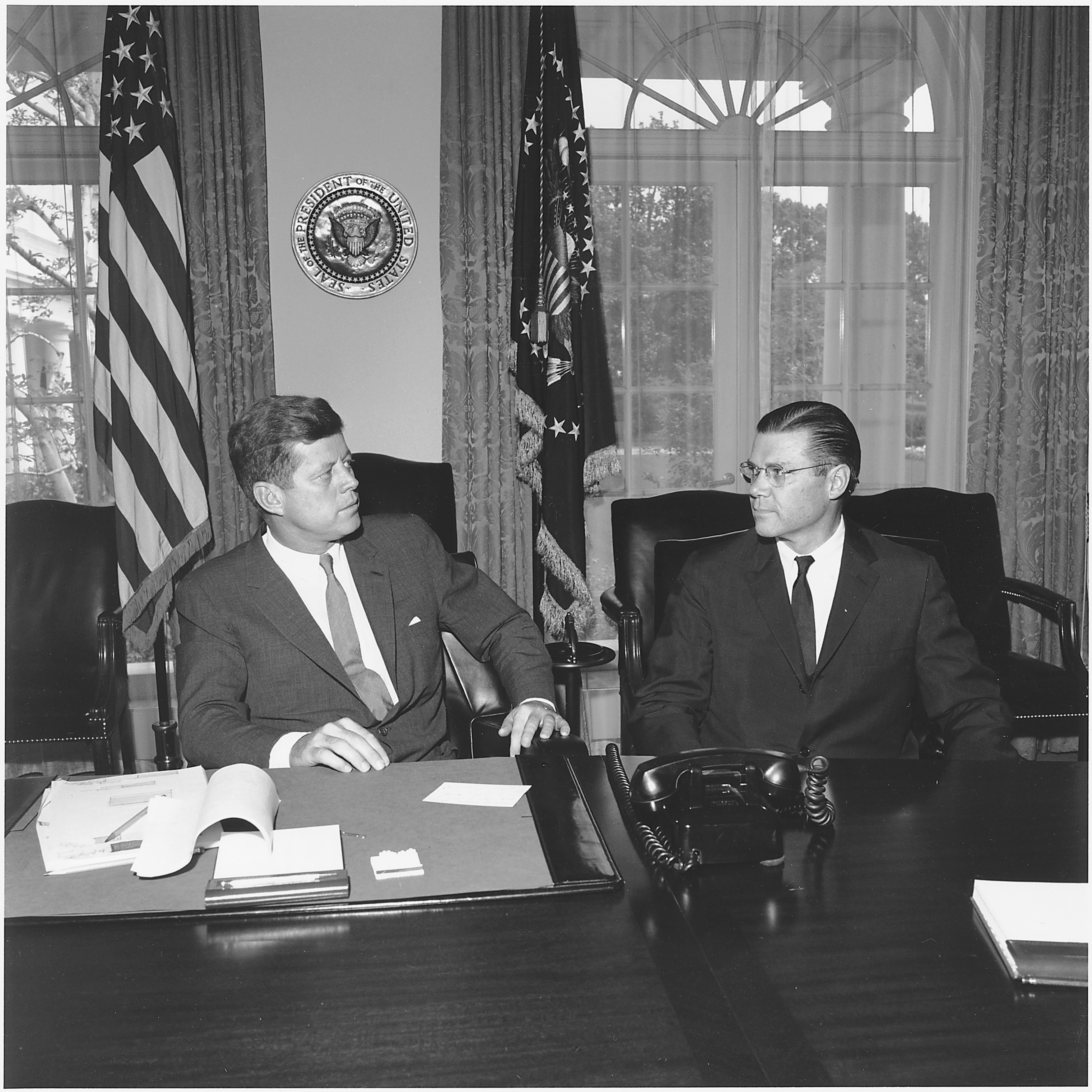
President Kennedy meeting with Secretary of Defense Robert McNamara, in June 1962

Kennedy advisors Maxwell Taylor and Walt Rostow recommended US troops be sent to South Vietnam disguised as flood relief workers. Kennedy rejected the idea but increased military assistance. In April 1962, John Kenneth Galbraith warned Kennedy of the "danger we shall replace the French as a colonial force...and bleed as the French did." Eisenhower put 900 advisors in Vietnam, and by November 1963, Kennedy had put 16,000.

The Strategic Hamlet Program was initiated in late 1961. This joint US–South Vietnamese program attempted to resettle the rural population into fortified villages. It was implemented in early 1962 and involved forced relocation and segregation of rural South Vietnamese, into new communities where the peasantry would be isolated from the VC. It was hoped these new communities would provide security for the peasants and strengthen the tie between them and central government. However, by November 1963 the program had waned, and it ended in 1964. In July 1962, 14 nations, including China, South Vietnam, the Soviet Union, North Vietnam, and the US, signed the International Agreement on the Neutrality of Laos.

=== Ousting and assassination of Diệm ===
The inept performance of the ARVN was exemplified by failed actions such as the Battle of Ap Bac in January 1963, in which the VC won a battle against a much larger and better-equipped South Vietnamese force, many of whose officers seemed reluctant to engage. The ARVN lost 83 soldiers and 5 US helicopters, serving to ferry troops shot down by VC forces, while the VC lost only 18 soldiers. The ARVN forces were led by Diệm's most trusted general, Huỳnh Văn Cao, a fellow Catholic from Huế whose main role was to stave off coups. Washington policymakers concluded Diệm was incapable of defeating the communists and might even make a deal with Ho Chi Minh. He seemed concerned only with fending off coups and had become paranoid after attempts in 1960 and 1962, which he partly attributed to US encouragement. Robert F. Kennedy noted, "Diệm wouldn't make even the slightest concessions. He was difficult to reason with ..."

Diệm's alienation of allies who had previously supported his anticommunist efforts, including Buddhist leaders, American officials, and military generals, fueled the unfolding 1963 crisis. Discontent with Diệm's administration erupted in May 1963, following the Huế Phật Đản shootings of 9 Buddhists protesting the ban on displaying the Buddhist flag on Vesak. This resulted in mass protests—the Buddhist crisis—against policies perceived as favoring Catholics over Buddhists. Diệm's elder brother, Archbishop Ngô Đình Thục of Huế, had held anniversary celebrations shortly before Vesak, with Catholic flags prominently displayed. Diệm refused to make concessions to the Buddhists or take responsibility for the deaths. In August 1963, Colonel Lê Quang Tung's ARVN Special Forces, loyal to Ngô Đình Nhu, raided pagodas, causing destruction and hundreds of deaths. The Republic of Vietnam sought to harness religious nationalism by promoting spiritual values in opposition to communism's atheism; however, this approach inadvertently amplified religious consciousness that challenged the state's authority.

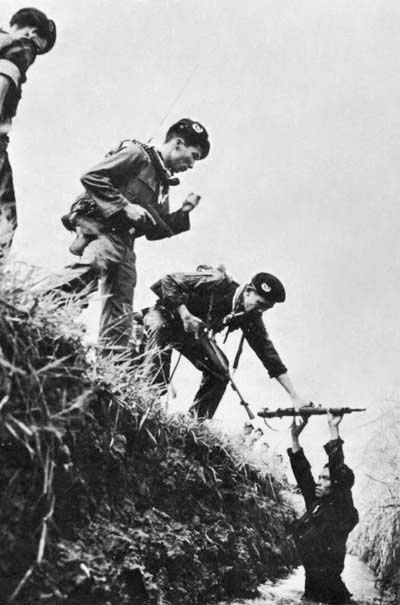
ARVN forces capture a Viet Cong

US officials began discussing regime change during 1963. The United States Department of State wanted to encourage a coup, while the Pentagon favored Diệm. Chief among the proposed changes was removal of Diệm's brother Nhu, who controlled the secret police and special forces, and was seen as being behind Buddhist repression and the Ngô family's rule. This proposal was conveyed to the US embassy in Saigon in Cable 243. The CIA contacted generals planning to remove Diệm, and told them the US would not oppose this, nor punish them by cutting off aid. Diệm was overthrown and executed, along with his brother, on 2 November 1963. When Kennedy was informed, Maxwell Taylor remembered he "rushed from the room with a look of shock and dismay on his face." Kennedy had not anticipated Diệm's murder. The US ambassador, Henry Cabot Lodge, invited coup leaders to the embassy and congratulated them. Lodge informed Kennedy that "the prospects now are for a shorter war". Kennedy wrote to Lodge congratulating him for "a fine job".

Following the coup, political instability engulfed South Vietnam as one military government toppled another. Taking advantage, Hanoi increased its support for the VC and portrayed each new Saigon regime as an American puppet. Whatever the failings of Diệm, his credentials as a nationalist had been impeccable. US advisors were embedded in the South Vietnamese armed forces. They were criticized for ignoring the political nature of the insurgency. The Kennedy administration sought to refocus US efforts on pacification – which in this case was defined as countering the insurgency – and "winning the hearts and minds" of the population. Military leadership in Washington, however, was hostile to any role for US advisors other than troop training. General Paul Harkins, the commander of US forces in South Vietnam, confidently predicted victory by Christmas 1963. The CIA was less optimistic, warning that "the Viet Cong by and large retain de facto control of much of the countryside and have steadily increased the overall intensity of the effort".

Paramilitary officers from the CIA's Special Activities Division trained and led Hmong tribesmen in Laos and into Vietnam. The indigenous forces were in the tens of thousands and conducted direct action missions, led by paramilitary officers, against the Communist Pathet Lao forces and their North Vietnamese supporters. The CIA participated in the Military Assistance Command, Vietnam – Studies and Observations Group (MAC-V SOG).

=== Hanoi's road to escalation ===
External image
- Third Congress of the Vietnamese Workers' Party Front row, from left: Lê Duẩn, Hồ Chí Minh, and Trường Chinh. Hanoi, September 1960.

Lê Duẩn, First Secretary of the VWP, and Nguyễn Chí Thanh, Director of the PAVN General Political Department and later head of COSVN, had opposed Nikita Khrushchev's policy of peaceful coexistence since 1960. According to Lien-Hang T. Nguyen, Lê Duẩn and Lê Đức Thọ consolidated power and marginalized opposition in the Politburo to create a police state in North Vietnam as early as 1960–1963. The opening of the Ho Chi Minh Sea Trail in late 1962, distinct from the land trail through Laos, together with significant increases in the size of the Viet Cong armed forces, gave communist military commanders the capacity to wage a much larger and deadlier campaign in the South. In April 1960, North Vietnam imposed military conscription for men. About 40,000 communist soldiers infiltrated the South between 1961 and 1963. Denouncing revisionist Soviet policies, Beijing increasingly endorsed Hanoi's war efforts in South Vietnam. In 1963, Hanoi formally rejected 'peaceful coexistence' as a strategic principle, while the intensification of the Sino-Soviet split enabled North Vietnamese leaders to obtain Chinese assurances of support for a more aggressive war approach. In December 1963, Duẩn put forward the strategy of a General Offensive and General Uprising to achieve military victory in 1964. More cautious members of the Politburo, including Hồ and Giáp, were pressured into accepting the militant line. The anti-revisionist Duẩn–Thọ faction then increasingly sidelined party members who favored Khrushchev's "pacifistic" policy and a peaceful reunification of Vietnam.

== Expansion of US involvement, 1964–68 ==
Kennedy was assassinated on 22 November 1963. Vice President Lyndon B. Johnson had not been heavily involved with policy toward Vietnam; (Note: Shortly after the assassination of Kennedy, when McGeorge Bundy called Johnson on the phone, Johnson responded: "Goddammit, Bundy. I've told you that when I want you I'll call you.") however he immediately focused on it. Johnson knew he had inherited a deteriorating situation, but adhered to the widely accepted domino argument for defending the South: Should they retreat or appease, either action would imperil other nations. Findings from RAND's Viet Cong Motivation and Morale Project bolstered his confidence that an air war would weaken the insurgency. Some argue the policy of North Vietnam was not to topple other non-communist governments in South East Asia.

The military revolutionary council, meeting in lieu of a strong South Vietnamese leader, had 12 members. It was headed by General Dương Văn Minh, whom journalist Stanley Karnow, recalled as "a model of lethargy". Lodge cabled home about Minh: "Will he be strong enough to get on top of things?" Minh's regime was overthrown in January 1964 by General Nguyễn Khánh. There was persistent instability in the military: several coups—not all successful—occurred in a short period of time.

=== Gulf of Tonkin incident ===
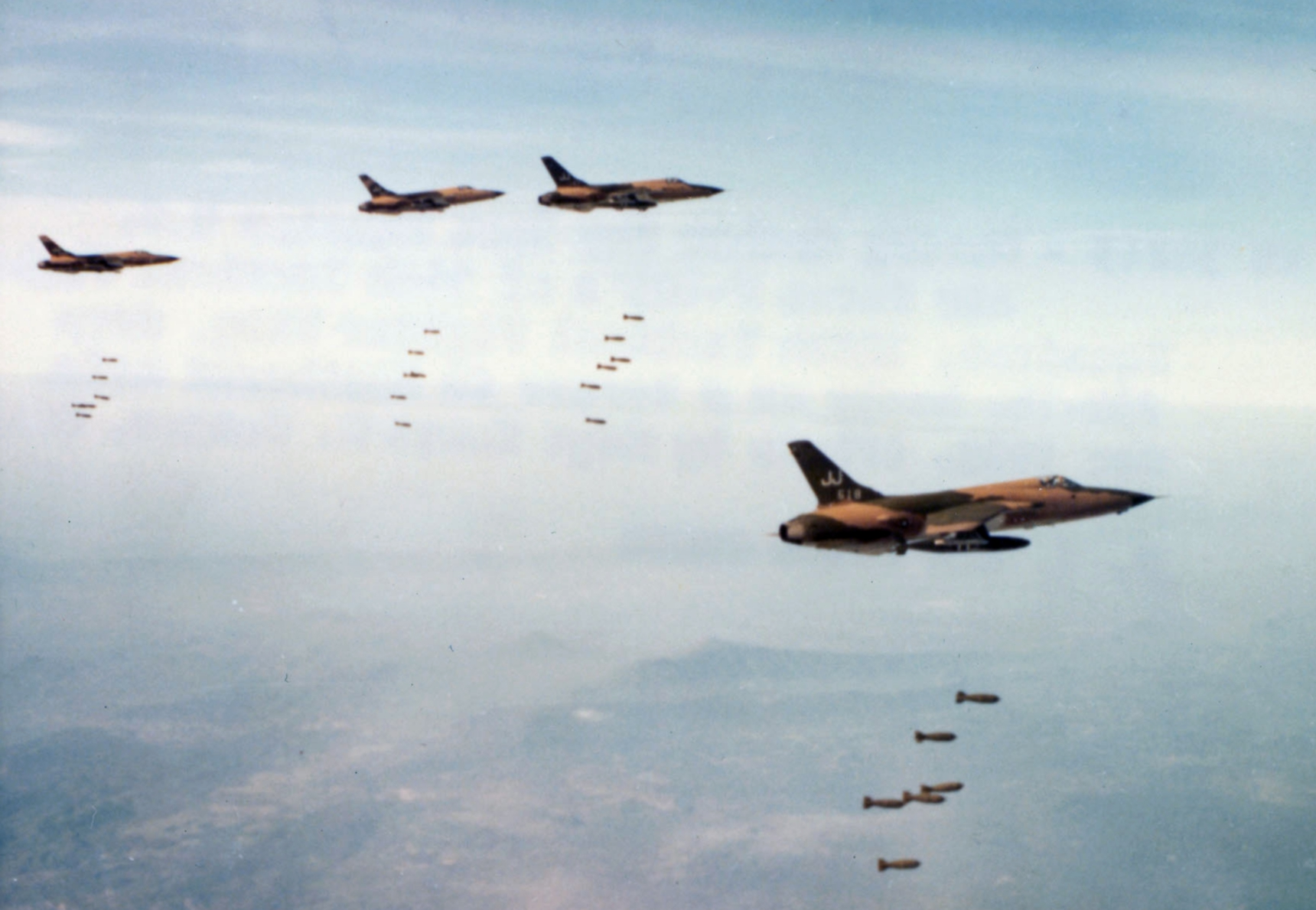
Republic F-105D fighter-bombers of the US Air Force drop 750 pound bombs during Operation Rolling Thunder

In early 1964, South Vietnamese commandos began launching US-backed raids on the North Vietnamese coast as a part of Operation 34A. On 2 August 1964, USS Maddox, conducting a DESOTO patrol to support the commandos, fired upon and damaged torpedo boats approaching it in the Gulf of Tonkin. A second attack was reported two days later on USS Turner Joy and Maddox. A document declassified in 2005 revealed there was no attack on 4 August, and that the NSA had skewed intelligence to create the impression that an attack had occurred. The circumstances of the incident were murky at the time. Johnson commented to Undersecretary of State George Ball that "those sailors out there may have been shooting at flying fish." Robert McNamara misled the public and Congress by concealing his knowledge of the raids which had provoked the attack on 2 August. The incident led the US to strike Vietnamese gunboats, and prompted Congress to approve the Gulf of Tonkin Resolution on 7 August. This granted the president power "to take all necessary measures to repel any armed attack against the forces of the United States and to prevent further aggression" and Johnson relied on this as giving him authority to expand the war. Johnson pledged he was not "committing American boys to fighting a war that I think ought to be fought by the boys of Asia to help protect their own land".

The National Security Council recommended an escalation of the bombing of North Vietnam. Following an attack on a US Army base in February 1965, airstrikes were initiated, while Soviet Premier Alexei Kosygin was on a state visit to North Vietnam. Operation Rolling Thunder and Operation Arc Light expanded aerial bombardment and ground support operations. The bombing campaign, which lasted three years, was intended to force North Vietnam to cease support for the VC by threatening to destroy North Vietnamese air defenses and infrastructure. It was additionally aimed at bolstering South Vietnamese morale. Between 1965 and 1968, Rolling Thunder deluged the north with a million tons of missiles, rockets and bombs. Meanwhile, following Khrushchev's ouster and the US bombardments, Hanoi toned down its anti-revisionist campaign and moved to improve relations with the Soviet Union.

=== Bombing of Laos ===
The US began sustained bombing of the Ho Chi Minh trail to disrupt communist supply lines. With Lao Prime Minister Souvanna Phouma's consent, US airstrikes began in December 1964 and escalated into a continuous bombing campaign by April 1965 that lasted for over three years.

Aerial bombardment against the Pathet Lao and PAVN forces was undertaken by the US to prevent the collapse of the government, and deny use of the Ho Chi Minh Trail. Between 1964 and 1973, the US dropped two million tons of bombs on Laos, similar to the 2.1 million tons of bombs it dropped on Europe and Asia during World War II, making Laos the most heavily bombed country in history.

The objective of stopping North Vietnam and the VC was never reached. The Chief of Staff of the United States Air Force, Curtis LeMay, however, had long advocated saturation bombing in Vietnam and wrote of the communists that "we're going to bomb them back into the Stone Age".

=== The 1964 offensive ===
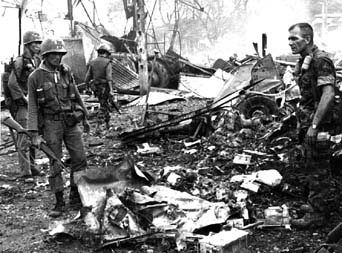
ARVN Forces and a US Advisor inspect a downed helicopter, Battle of Dong Xoai, June 1965

Following the Tonkin Resolution, Hanoi anticipated the arrival of US troops and expanded the VC, as well as sending PAVN personnel southwards. They were outfitting the VC forces and standardizing their equipment with AK-47 rifles and other supplies, as well as forming the 9th Division. "From a strength of approximately 5,000 at the start of 1959 the Viet Cong's ranks grew to about 100,000 at the end of 1964 ... Between 1961 and 1964 the Army's strength rose from about 850,000 to nearly a million men." US troop numbers deployed were much lower: 2,000 in 1961, rising to 16,500 in 1964. The use of captured equipment decreased, while more ammunition and supplies were required to maintain regular units. Group 559 was tasked with expanding the Ho Chi Minh Trail, in light of US bombardment. The war had shifted into the final, conventional phase of Hanoi's three-stage protracted warfare model. The VC was tasked with destroying the ARVN, and capturing and holding areas; however, it was not yet strong enough to assault towns and cities.

In December 1964, ARVN forces suffered losses at the Battle of Bình Giã, in a battle both sides viewed as a watershed. Previously, the VC had utilized hit-and-run guerrilla tactics. At Binh Gia, they defeated a strong ARVN force in a conventional battle and remained in the field for four days. Tellingly, South Vietnamese forces were again defeated in June 1965 at the Battle of Đồng Xoài.

=== American ground war ===
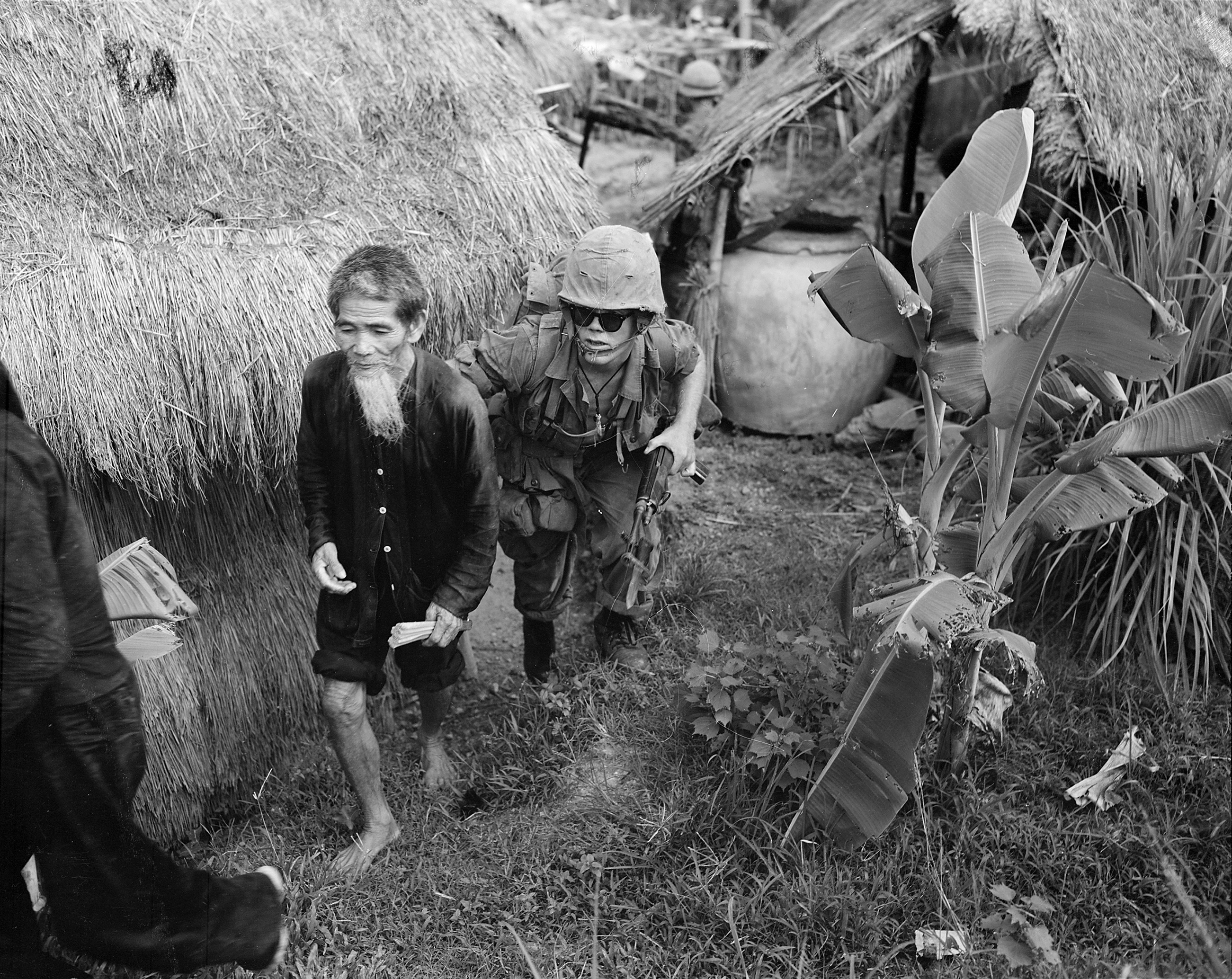
A Marine from 1st Battalion, 3rd Marines, moves a suspected Viet Cong during a search and clear operation held by the battalion 15 miles (24 km) west of Da Nang Air Base, 1965.

On 8 March 1965, 3,500 US Marines were landed near Da Nang, South Vietnam. This marked the beginning of America's ground war. US public opinion overwhelmingly supported the deployment. The Marines' initial assignment was defense of Da Nang Air Base. The first deployment was increased to nearly 200,000 by December. US military had been schooled in offensive warfare. Regardless of policy, US commanders were institutionally and psychologically unsuited to defensive missions.

General William Westmoreland informed Admiral U. S. Grant Sharp Jr., commander of US Pacific forces, that the situation was critical, but was convinced that US troops could defeat the VC. With this recommendation, Westmoreland advocated an aggressive departure from America's defensive posture and sidelining of the South Vietnamese. By ignoring ARVN units, the US commitment became open-ended. Westmoreland outlined a three-point plan to win:

- Phase 1. Commitment of US and allied forces necessary to halt the losing trend by the end of 1965.
- Phase 2. US and allied forces mount major offensive actions to seize the initiative to destroy guerrilla and organized enemy forces. This phase would end when the enemy had been worn down and driven back from major populated areas.
- Phase 3. If the enemy persisted, a period of 12–18 months following Phase 2 would be required for final destruction of forces remaining in remote base areas.

The plan was approved by Johnson and marked a profound departure from the insistence that South Vietnam was responsible for defeating the VC. Westmoreland predicted victory by December 1967. Johnson did not communicate this change to the media; instead, he emphasized continuity. The change in policy depended on matching the North Vietnamese and VC in a contest of attrition and morale. The opponents were locked in an escalation cycle. However, Johnson ruled out invasion of North Vietnam due to fears of Chinese or Soviet intervention. Westmoreland and McNamara touted the body count system for gauging victory, a metric that proved flawed.

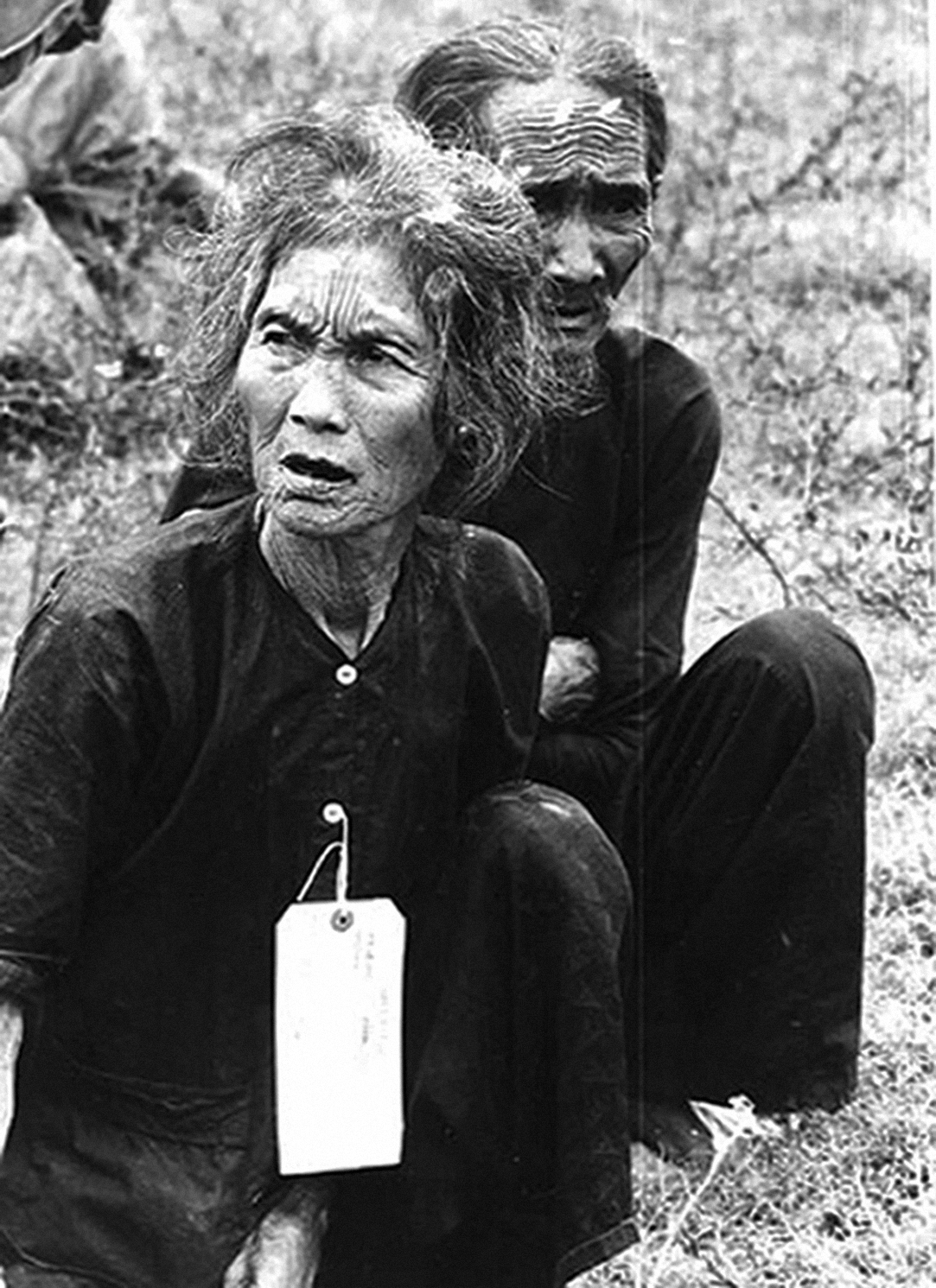
Peasants suspected of being Viet Cong under detention of US Army, 1966

The American buildup transformed South Vietnam's economy and society, flooding the country with manufactured goods. Washington encouraged its SEATO allies to contribute troops; Australia, New Zealand, Thailand and the Philippines agreed. South Korea asked to join the Many Flags program in return for economic compensation. Major allies, however, notably Canada and the UK, declined troop requests.

The US and allies mounted complex search and destroy operations. In November 1965, the US engaged in its first major battle with the PAVN, the Battle of Ia Drang. The operation was the first large scale helicopter air assault by the US, and first to employ Boeing B-52 Stratofortress bombers. These tactics continued in 1966–67; however, the PAVN/VC insurgents remained elusive and demonstrated tactical flexibility. By 1967, the war had generated large-scale internal refugees, 2 million in South Vietnam, with 125,000 people evacuated and rendered homeless during Operation Masher alone, the largest search and destroy operation to that point. Operation Masher had negligible impact however, as the PAVN/VC returned to the province just four months afterwards. Despite major operations, which the VC and PAVN would evade, the war was characterized by smaller-unit engagements. The VC and PAVN would initiate 90% of large firefights, and thus the PAVN/VC would retain strategic initiative despite overwhelming US force and firepower deployment. The PAVN and Viet Cong had developed strategies capable of countering US doctrines and tactics.

Meanwhile, South Vietnamese politics began to stabilize with the arrival of prime minister Air Marshal Nguyễn Cao Kỳ and figurehead chief of state, General Nguyễn Văn Thiệu, in mid-1965. In 1967, Thieu became president with Ky as his deputy, after rigged elections. (Note: "A poll taken in the Delta province of Long An would show 35% of the people ready to vote for Thieu, 20% favoring the National Liberation Front, and 45% backing someone, anyone, opposed to both the Viet Cong and the American-backed regime in Saigon.") Though nominally a civilian government, Kỳ was expected to maintain real power through a behind-the-scenes military body. However, Thiệu outmaneuvered and sidelined Kỳ. Thiệu remained president until 1975, having won a one-candidate election in 1971.

Johnson employed a "policy of minimum candor" with the media. Military information officers sought to manage coverage by emphasizing stories that portrayed progress. This damaged public trust in official pronouncements. As coverage of the war and the Pentagon diverged, a credibility gap developed. Despite Johnson and Westmoreland proclaiming victory and Westmoreland stating the "end is coming into view", internal reports in the Pentagon Papers indicate VC forces retained strategic initiative and controlled their losses. VC attacks against static US positions accounted for 30% of engagements, VC/PAVN ambushes and encirclements for 23%, American ambushes against VC/PAVN forces for 9%, and American forces attacking VC emplacements only 5%.

== 1968 Tet Offensive and its aftermath ==
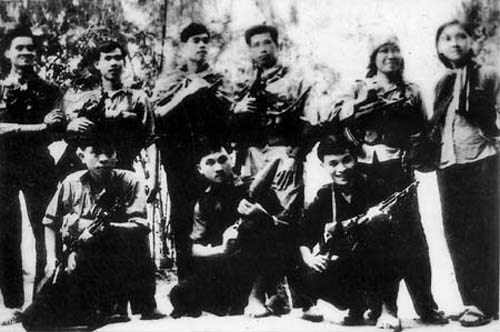
Viet Cong before departing to participate in the Tet Offensive around Saigon-Gia Dinh

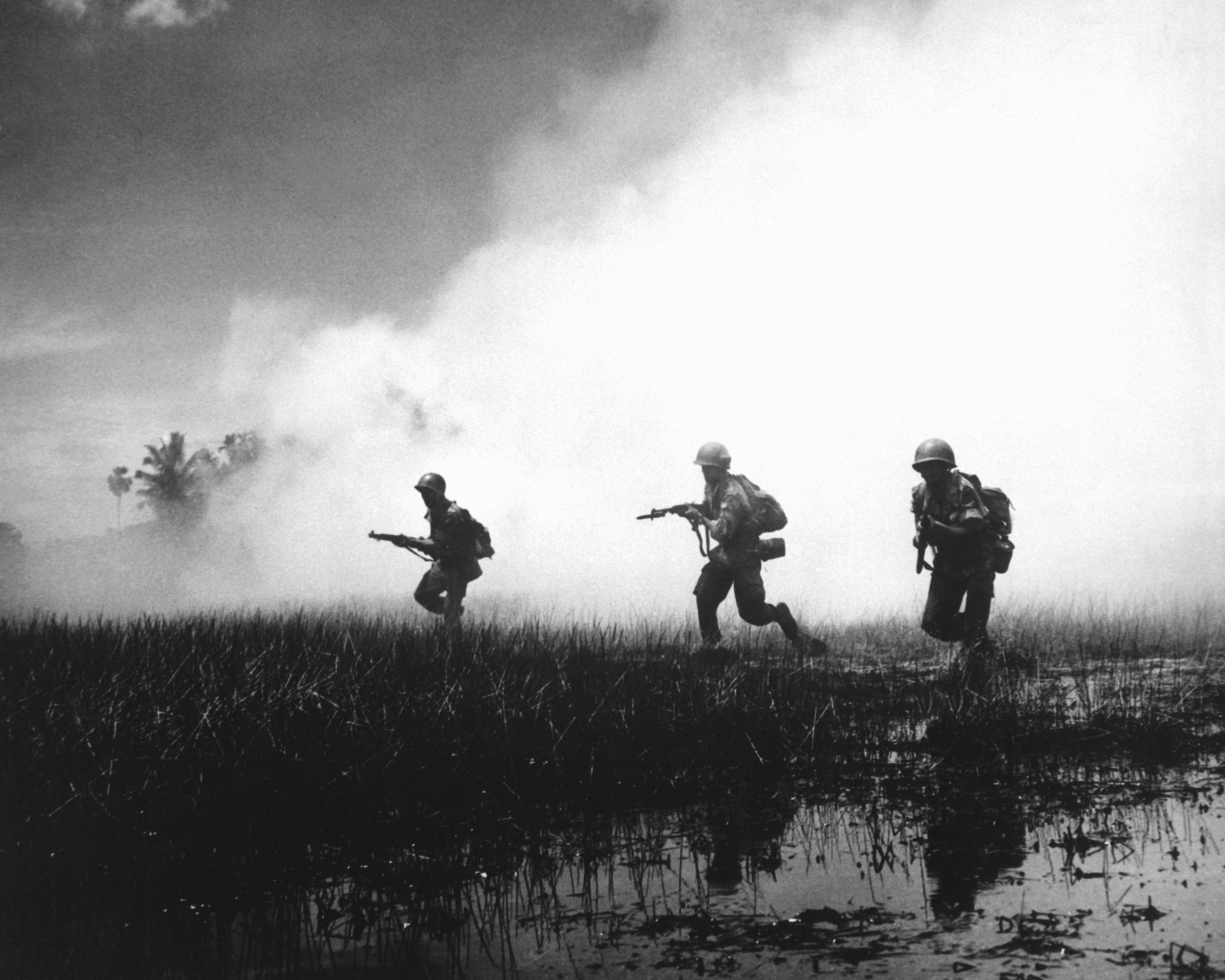
ARVN forces assault a stronghold in the Mekong Delta

In late 1967, the PAVN lured American forces into the hinterlands at Đắk Tô and at the Marine Khe Sanh combat base, where the US fought The Hill Fights. These were part of a diversionary strategy to draw US forces towards the Central Highlands. Preparations were underway for the Tet Offensive, with the intention of Văn Tiến Dũng forces to launch "direct attacks on the American and puppet nerve centers—Saigon, Huế, Danang, all the cities, towns and main bases [...]". Lê Duẩn sought to placate critics of the stalemate by achieving a decisive victory; several hundred party cadres and intellectuals were arrested. He reasoned the victory could be achieved through sparking an uprising in the towns and cities, along with defections among ARVN units, who were on leave during the truce period.

The Tet Offensive began in January 1968, as over 100 cities were attacked by over 85,000 VC/PAVN troops, including assaults on military installations, headquarters, and government buildings, including the US Embassy in Saigon. US and South Vietnamese forces were shocked by the scale, intensity and deliberative planning, as the infiltration of Communist personnel and weapons into the cities was accomplished covertly. The offensive constituted an intelligence failure on the scale of Pearl Harbor. Most cities were recaptured within weeks, except the former imperial capital Huế, which PAVN/VC troops held on for 26 days. They executed approximately 2,800 unarmed Huế civilians, ARVN POWs, and foreigners they considered spies. In the Battle of Huế American forces employed massive firepower that left 80% of the city in ruins. At Quảng Trị City, the ARVN Airborne Division, the 1st Division and a US 1st Cavalry Division regiment held out and overcame an assault intended to capture the city. In Saigon, VC/PAVN fighters had captured areas in and around the city, attacking key installations before US and ARVN forces dislodged them. Peter Arnett reported an infantry commander saying of the Battle of Bến Tre that "it became necessary to destroy the village in order to save it".

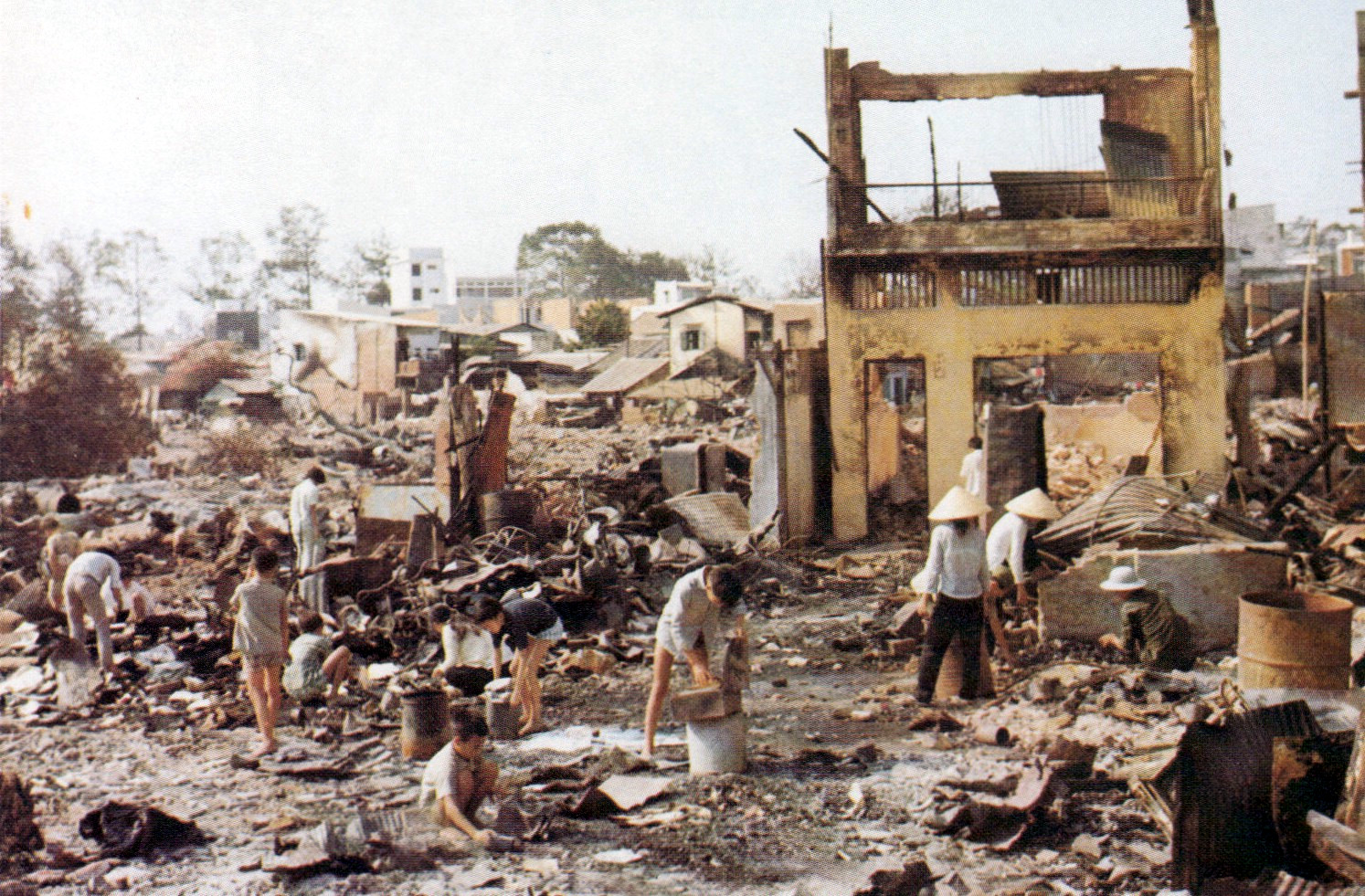
The ruins of a section of Saigon, in the Cholon neighborhood, following fierce fighting between ARVN forces and Viet Cong Main Force battalions

During the first month of Tet, 1,100 American and allied troops, 2,100 ARVN and 14,000 civilians were killed. After two months, 5,000 ARVN and 4,000 US forces had been killed and 46,000 wounded. The US claimed 17,000 PAVN/VC had been killed and 15,000 wounded. A month later the May Offensive was launched; it demonstrated the VC were still capable of orchestrating nationwide offensives. Two months later the Phase III offensive was launched. Communist losses across the offensives was 45,267 killed and 111,179 total casualties, mostly Viet Cong. It had become the bloodiest year up to then. The failure to spark a general uprising and lack of defections among the ARVN units meant Hanoi's goals had failed at enormous cost.

Prior to Tet, in November 1967, Westmoreland had spearheaded a public relations drive for the Johnson administration to bolster flagging public support. In a speech to the National Press Club he said "the end comes into view". Thus, the public was shocked and confused by the Tet Offensive. Public approval of his performance dropped from 48% to 36%, and endorsement for the war fell from 40% to 26%. The public turned against Johnson as the offensives contradicted claims of progress.

During 1968, Westmoreland considered the use of nuclear weapons in a contingency plan codenamed Fracture Jaw, which was abandoned when it became known to the White House. Westmoreland and Chairman of the Joint Chiefs of Staff General Earle Wheeler requested more than 200,000 additional troops. This quickly leaked to the media, and the fallout combined with intelligence failures caused Westmoreland to be removed in March 1968, succeeded by his deputy Creighton Abrams.

On 10 May 1968, peace talks began between the US and North Vietnam in Paris. Negotiations stagnated for five months, until Johnson halted the bombing of North Vietnam. Hanoi realized it could not achieve a "total victory" and employed a strategy known as "talking while fighting, fighting while talking", in which offensives occurred concurrently with negotiations.

Johnson declined to run for re-election as his approval rating slumped from 48% to 36%. His escalation of the war divided Americans, cost 30,000 American lives by that point and is regarded as having destroyed his presidency. Robert McNamara later said "the dangerous illusion of victory by the United States was therefore dead", but this was an exaggeration. There continued to be important Americans who hoped for victory, including Johnson. On 31 March 1968, he announced that he would not seek re-election and offered to begin peace negotiations with Hanoi by substantially reducing hostilities. However, he continued military operations to strengthen his negotiating position.

Johnson did not make the huge increase in US troop strength that Generals Westmoreland and Wheeler had requested a few weeks earlier, but he did send significant reinforcements. There were about 515,000 US military personnel in Vietnam at the time of his speech. There were 536,000 two months later. He narrowed the area of North Vietnam on which US bombs fell, but in April 1968, the first month in which bombing was limited to the southern part of North Vietnam, the United States dropped almost twice as many tons of bombs there as had been dropped on the whole of North Vietnam in March. More importantly, US bombing of Indochina as a whole was increasing. The most the US had dropped in Indochina in any month before Johnson's speech had been about 98,000 tons. In April 1968, the month after his speech, the figure rose to almost 113,000 tons.

Vietnam was a major issue during the United States presidential election in 1968. The election was won by Republican Richard Nixon who claimed to have a secret plan to end the war. In South Vietnam, following the promulgation of the 1967 liberal constitution, tensions between the government and the press persisted amid large-scale communist attacks.

== Vietnamization, 1969–1972 ==
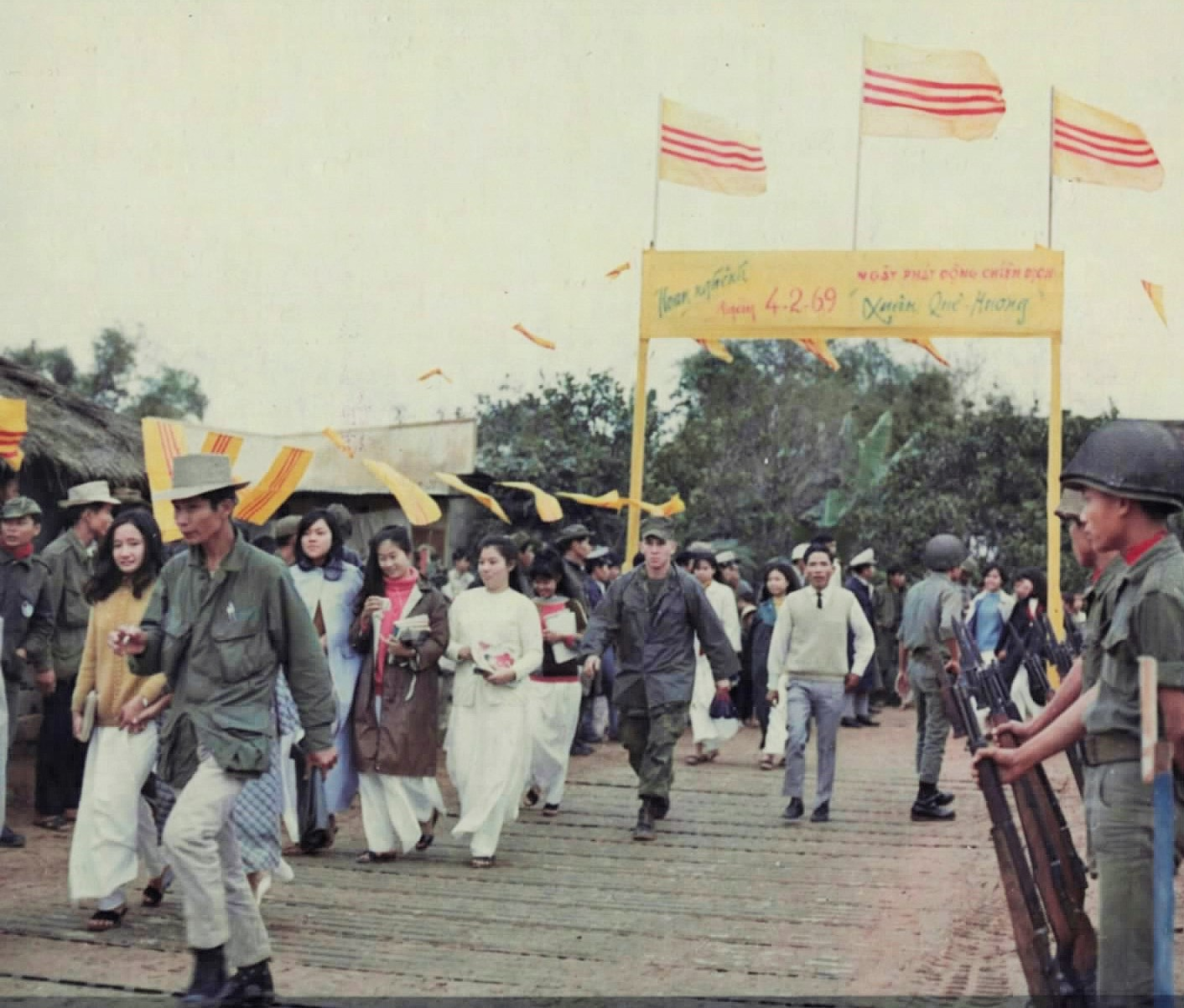
A chiêu hồi ('open arms') center for defectors from communist forces to the Republic of Vietnam, 1969

=== Nuclear threats and diplomacy ===
Nixon began troop withdrawals in 1969. His plan to build up the ARVN so it could take over defense of South Vietnam became known as "Vietnamization". As the PAVN/VC recovered from their 1968 losses and avoided contact, Abrams conducted operations aimed at disrupting logistics, with better use of firepower and more cooperation with the ARVN. In October 1969, Nixon had ordered B-52s with nuclear weapons to race to the border of Soviet airspace to convince the Soviets, in accordance with the madman theory, he was capable of anything to end the war. Nixon had sought détente with the Soviet Union and rapprochement with China, which decreased tensions and led to nuclear arms reductions. However, the Soviets continued to supply North Vietnam.

=== Hanoi's war strategy ===
On 2 September 1969, Ho Chi Minh died. The failure of the Tet Offensive to spark an uprising in the south caused a shift in Hanoi's war strategy, and the Giáp-Chinh "Northern-First" faction regained control over military affairs from the Lê Duẩn-Hoàng Văn Thái "Southern-First" faction. An unconventional victory was sidelined in favor of conventional through conquest. Large-scale offensives were rolled back in favor of small-unit and sapper attacks as well as targeting the pacification and Vietnamization strategy. Following Tet, the PAVN had transformed from a light-infantry, limited mobility force into high-mobility and mechanized combined arms.

=== US domestic controversies ===
The anti-war movement was gaining strength in the US. Nixon appealed to the "silent majority" who he said supported the war. But revelations of the 1968 My Lai massacre, in which a US Army unit raped and killed more than 500 Vietnamese civilians, and the 1969 "Green Beret Affair", where Special Forces soldiers were arrested for the murder of a suspected double agent, provoked outrage.

In 1971, the Pentagon Papers were leaked to The New York Times. The secret history of US involvement, commissioned by the Department of Defense, detailed public deceptions by the government. The Supreme Court ruled publication legal.

=== Collapsing US morale ===
Following Tet and decreasing public support, US forces began a period of morale collapse, and disobedience. At home, desertion rates quadrupled from 1966 levels. Among the enlisted, only 2.5% chose infantry between 1969 and 1970. ROTC enrollment decreased from 191,749 in 1966 to 72,459 by 1971, and a low of 33,220 in 1974, depriving the US of much-needed military leadership.

Refusal to engage in patrols or carry out orders emerged, with a case of an entire company refusing orders. Unit cohesion began to dissipate and focused on minimizing contact with the PAVN/VC. A practice known as "sand-bagging" started, where units ordered to patrol would go into the country-side, find a site out of view from superiors and radio in false coordinates and reports. Drug usage increased, 30% regularly used marijuana, while a House subcommittee found 10% used heroin. From 1969, search-and-destroy operations became referred to as "search and avoid", falsifying battle reports while avoiding guerrillas. 900 fragging (killing a fellow officer, usually superior) and suspected fragging incidents were investigated, most occurring between 1969 and 1971. In 1969, field-performance was characterized by low morale and poor leadership. The decline in morale was demonstrated by the Battle of FSB Mary Ann in 1971, in which a sapper attack inflicted serious losses on US defenders. Westmoreland, no longer in command but tasked with investigation of the failure, cited dereliction of duty, lax defensive postures and lack of officers in charge. Shelby Stanton attributed the American Army's decline in its final years to deteriorating morale, racial tensions, drug abuse, combat disobedience, crime, strategic failures, inadequate wartime preparation, and ineffective Vietnamization.

=== Vietnamization ===
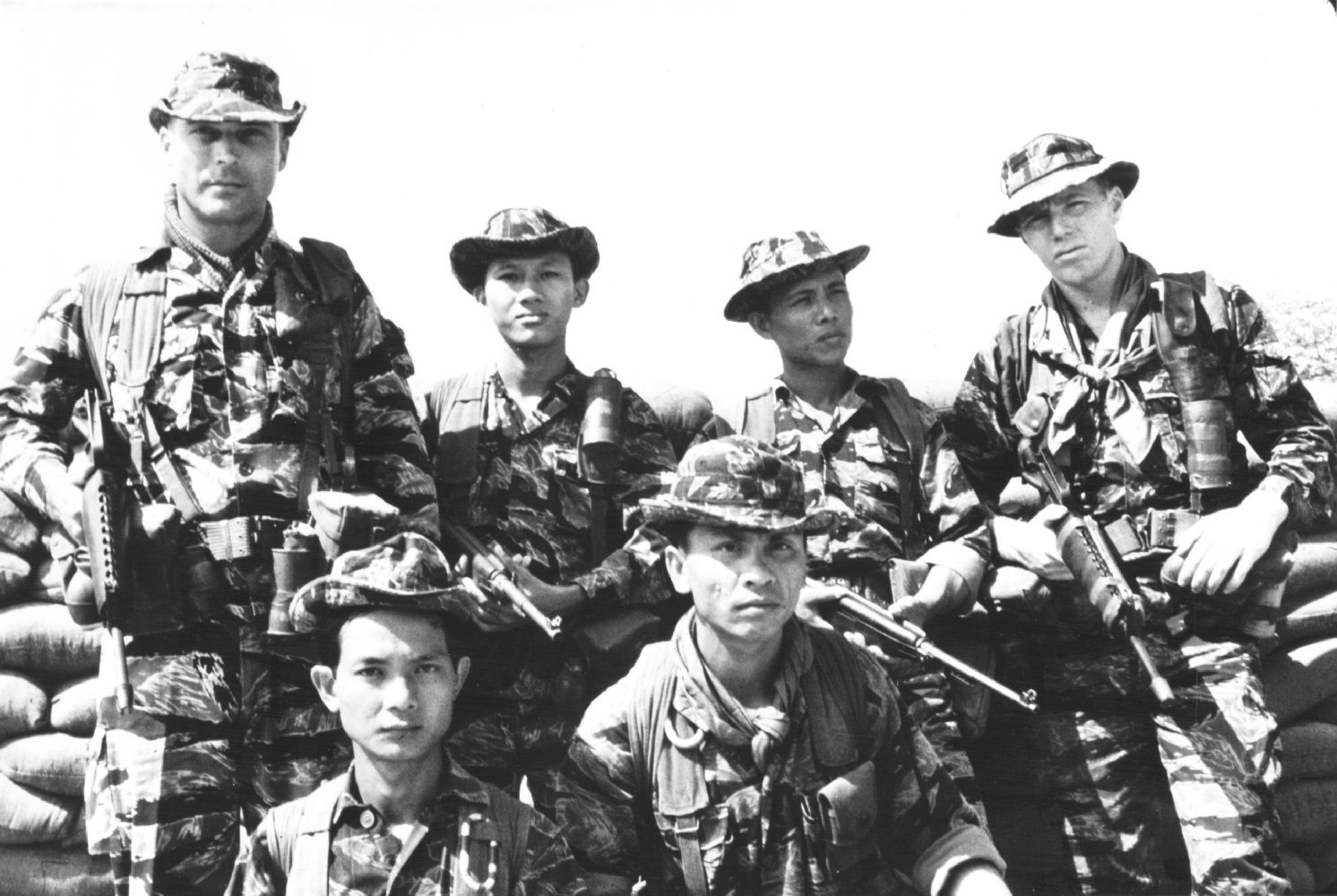
ARVN and US Special Forces, 1968

Beginning in 1969, American troops were withdrawn from border areas where most of the fighting took place and redeployed along the coast and interior. US casualties in 1970 were less than half of 1969, after being relegated to less active combat. While US forces were redeployed, the ARVN took over combat operations, with casualties double US ones in 1969, and triple in 1970. Post-Tet, membership in the South Vietnamese Regional Forces and Popular Force militias grew, and they could now provide village security, which the Americans had not accomplished.

In 1970, Nixon announced the withdrawal of an additional 150,000 American troops, reducing US numbers to 265,500. By 1970, VC forces were no longer southern-majority, nearly 70% were northerners. Between 1969 and 1971 the VC and some PAVN units had reverted to small unit tactics, instead of nationwide offensives. In 1971, Australia and New Zealand withdrew their soldiers and US troops were reduced to 196,700, with a deadline to remove another 45,000 troops by February 1972. The US reduced support troops, and in March 1971 the 5th Special Forces Group, the first American unit deployed, withdrew. (Note: On 8 March 1965 the first American combat troops, the Third Marine Regiment, Third Marine Division, began landing in Vietnam to protect the Da Nang Air Base.)

=== Cambodia ===
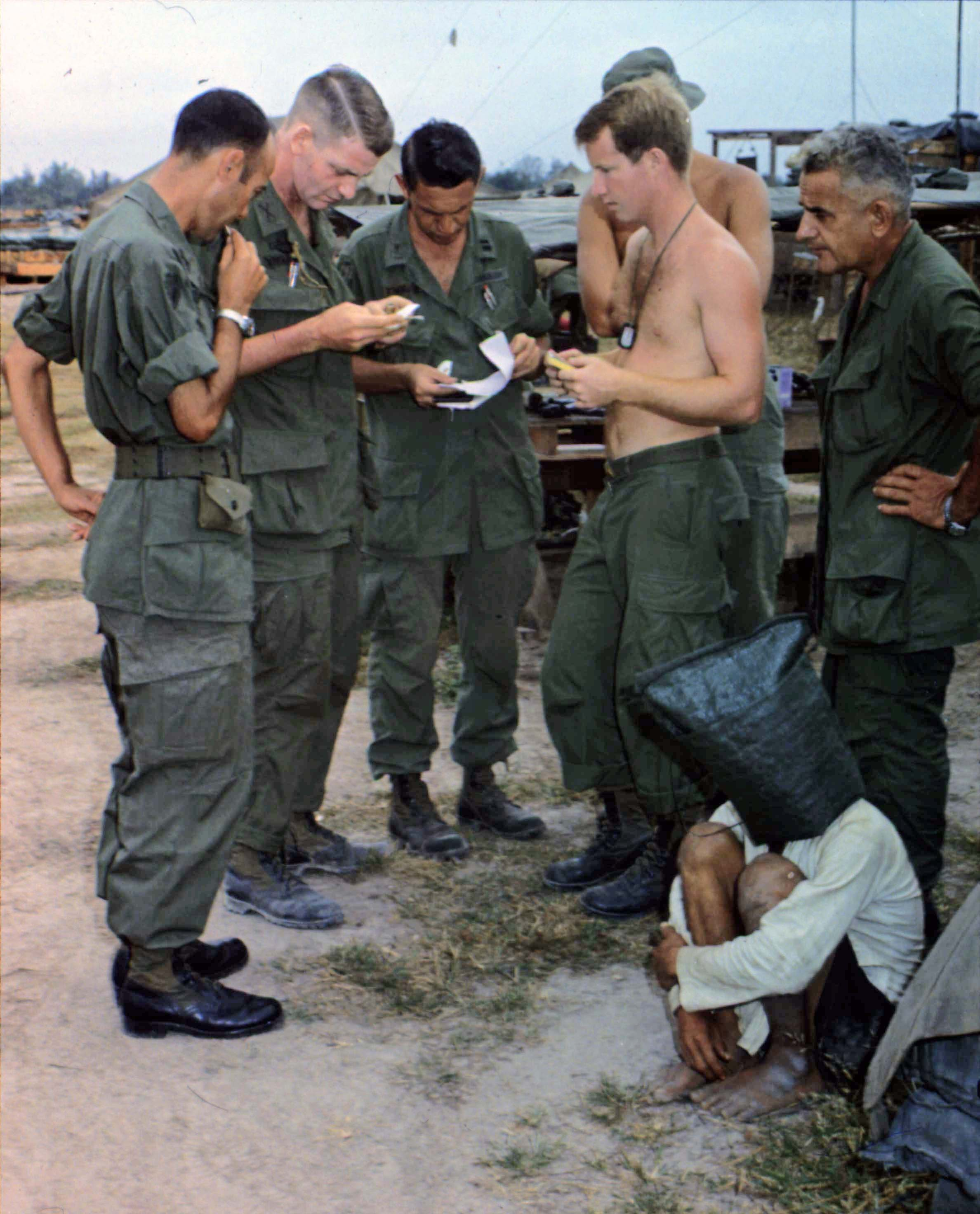
An alleged Viet Cong captured during an attack on an American outpost near the Cambodian border is interrogated.

Prince Norodom Sihanouk had proclaimed Cambodia neutral since 1955, but permitted the PAVN/VC to use the port of Sihanoukville and Sihanouk Trail. In March 1969 Nixon launched a secret bombing campaign, called Operation Menu, against communist sanctuaries along the Cambodia/Vietnam border. Only five congressional officials were informed. (Note: They were: Senators John C. Stennis (MS) and Richard B. Russell Jr. (GA) and Representatives Lucius Mendel Rivers (SC), Gerald R. Ford (MI) and Leslie C. Arends (IL). Arends and Ford were leaders of the Republican minority and the other three were Democrats on either the Armed Services or Appropriations committees.)

In March 1970, Sihanouk was deposed by his pro-American prime minister Lon Nol, who demanded North Vietnamese troops leave Cambodia or face military action. Nol began rounding up Vietnamese civilians in Cambodia and massacring them, provoking reactions from the North and South Vietnamese governments. In April–May 1970, North Vietnam invaded Cambodia at the request of the Khmer Rouge, following negotiations with deputy leader Nuon Chea. Nguyen Co Thach recalls: "Nuon Chea has asked for help and we have liberated five provinces of Cambodia in ten days." US and ARVN forces launched the Cambodian campaign in May to attack PAVN/VC bases. A counter-offensive in 1971, as part of Operation Chenla II by the PAVN, recaptured most border areas and decimated Nol's forces.

The US incursion into Cambodia sparked US protests as Nixon had promised to deescalate involvement. Students were killed by National Guardsmen in May 1970 at a Kent State University protest, which provoked further outrage. The administration's reaction was seen as callous, reinvigorating the anti-war movement. The US continued to bomb Cambodia as part of Operation Freedom Deal.

=== Laos ===
Building on the success of ARVN units in Cambodia, and further testing the Vietnamization program, the ARVN was tasked with Operation Lam Son 719 in February 1971, the first major ground operation to attack and interdict the Ho Chi Minh Trail. This was the first time the PAVN would field-test its combined arms forces. The first few days were a success, but momentum slowed after fierce resistance. Thiệu halted the general advance, enabling PAVN armored divisions to surround them.

Thieu ordered air assault troops to capture the Tchepone crossroad and withdraw, despite facing forces outnumbering them by four times. During the withdrawal, a PAVN counterattack forced the retreating ARVN into a panicked rout. Half of the ARVN troops were either captured or killed, and half the ARVN/US helicopters were downed. The operation was a disaster and demonstrated the operational deficiencies within the ARVN. Nixon and Thieu had sought a showcase victory simply by capturing Tchepone, and it was spun off as an "operational success".

=== 1972 Easter Offensive and Paris Accords ===
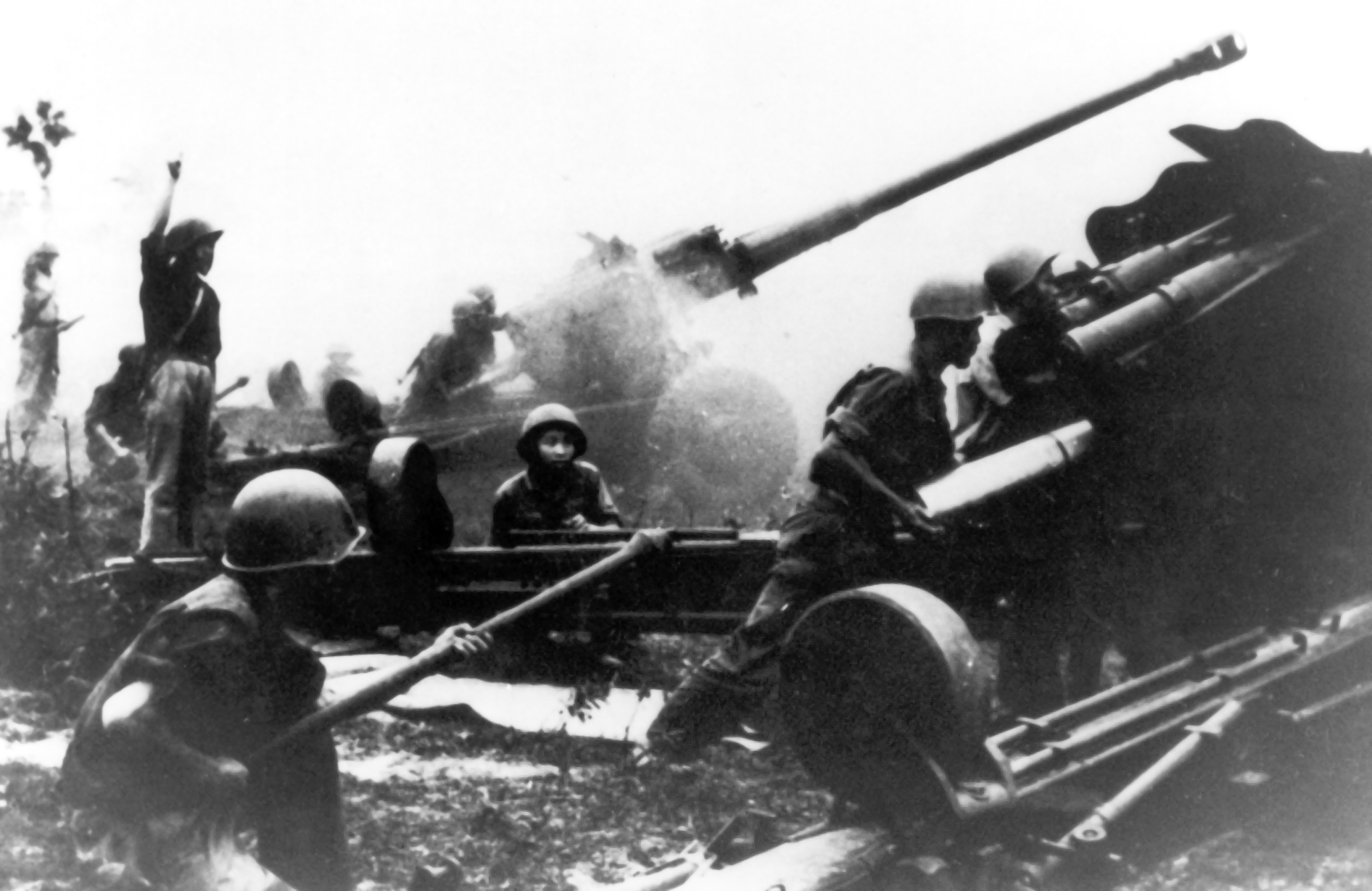
PAVN artillery bombards ARVN positions near Kon Tum, 1972

In 1972, North Vietnam launched a conventional invasion of South Vietnam in the Easter Offensive with 300,000 troops and hundreds of tanks. The PAVN overran the northern provinces and attacked towards Saigon from Cambodia, threatening to cut the country in half. The fighting was characterized by vicious fighting between PAVN and ARVN formations, especially in An Loc and Kontum.

Although the US was withdrawing their troops from the country, it provided critical air support for ARVN's defense of the South Vietnam, beginning Operation Linebacker. The offensive was halted with heavy casualties on both sides, estimated at over 200,000 soldiers and civilians for both sides. The US Navy initiated Operation Pocket Money in May, an aerial mining campaign in Haiphong Harbor that prevented North Vietnam's allies from resupplying it with weapons.

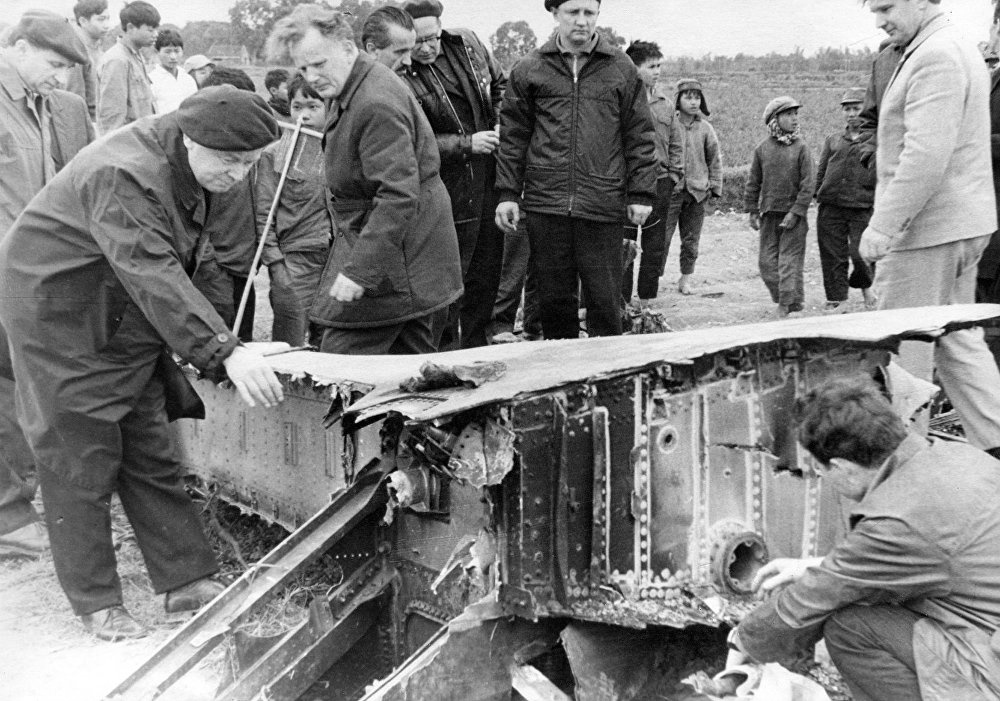
Soviet advisers inspecting the debris of a B-52 downed in the vicinity of Hanoi

The war was central to the 1972 US presidential election as Nixon's opponent, George McGovern, campaigned on immediate withdrawal. Nixon's Security Advisor, Henry Kissinger, had continued secret negotiations with North Vietnam's Lê Đức Thọ and in October 1972 reached an agreement. Thiệu demanded changes to the peace accord upon its discovery, and when North Vietnam went public with the details, the Nixon administration claimed they were attempting to embarrass the president. The negotiations became deadlocked when Hanoi demanded changes. To show his support for South Vietnam and force Hanoi back to the negotiating table, Nixon ordered Operation Linebacker II, a bombing of Hanoi and Haiphong in December. Nixon pressured Thiệu to accept the agreement or face military action.

On 15 January 1973, all US combat activities were suspended. Lê Đức Thọ and Henry Kissinger, along with the PRG Foreign Minister Nguyễn Thị Bình and a reluctant Thiệu, signed the Paris Peace Accords on 27 January. This ended direct US involvement in the war, created a ceasefire between North Vietnam/PRG and South Vietnam, guaranteed the territorial integrity of Vietnam under the Geneva Conference, called for elections or a political settlement between the PRG and South Vietnam, allowed 200,000 communist troops to remain in the south, and agreed to a POW exchange. There was a 60-day period for the withdrawal of US forces. "This article proved ... to be the only one ... which was fully carried out." All US forces personnel were withdrawn by March.

== US exit and final campaigns, 1973–1975 ==
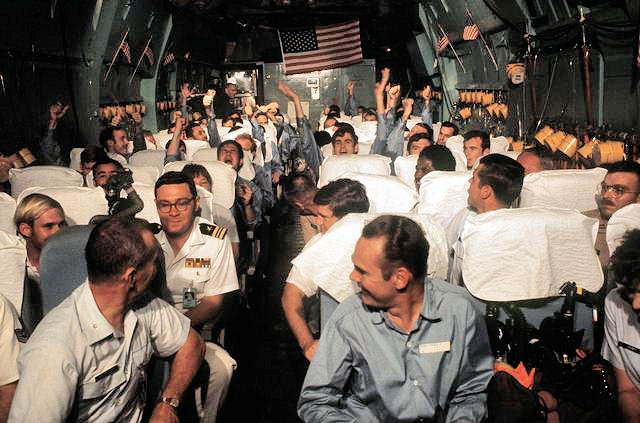
American POWs recently released from North Vietnamese prison camps, 1973

In the lead-up to the ceasefire on 28 January, both sides attempted to maximize land and population under their control in a campaign known as the War of the Flags. Fighting continued after the ceasefire, without US participation, and throughout the year.

On 15 March 1973, Nixon implied the US would intervene militarily if the North launched a full offensive, and Defense Secretary Schlesinger re-affirmed this during his confirmation hearings. Public and congressional reaction was unfavorable, prompting the Senate to pass the Case–Church Amendment to prohibit intervention.

Northern leaders expected the ceasefire terms would favor their side, but Saigon, bolstered by a surge of US aid just before the ceasefire, began to roll them back. The North responded with a new strategy developed in March 1973 according to General Trần Văn Trà, the VC commander-in-chief at the time. With US bombings suspended, work on the Ho Chi Minh Trail as well as other logistical structures could proceed. Logistics would be upgraded until the North was in a position to launch a massive invasion of the South, projected for the 1975–76 dry season. Trà calculated this would be Hanoi's last opportunity to strike, before Saigon's army could be fully trained.

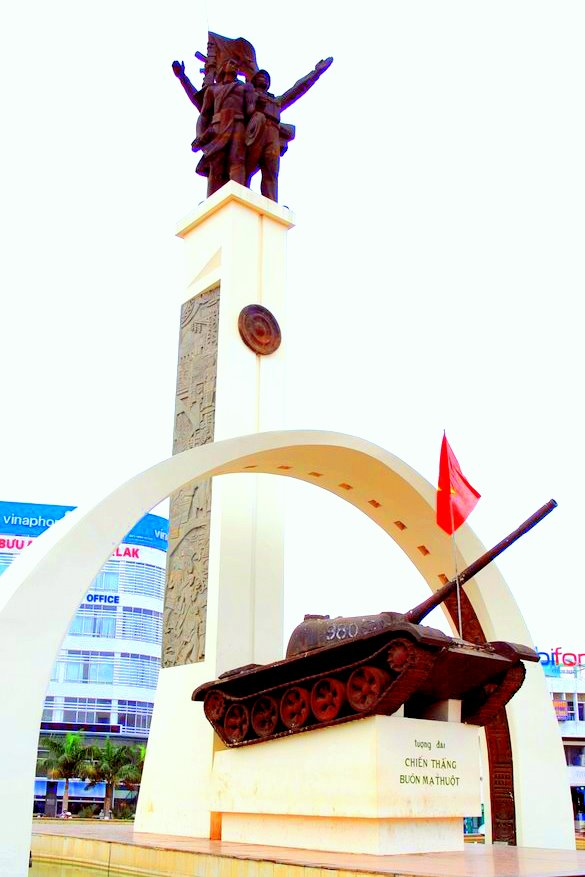
Memorial commemorating the 1974 Buon Me Thuot campaign, depicting a Montagnard of the Central Highlands, a NVA soldier and a T-54 tank

In South Vietnam, the US departure, and recession after the 1973 oil crisis, hurt an economy dependent on US support and troop presence. After clashes that left 55 ARVN soldiers dead, Thiệu announced in January 1974, that the war had restarted and the Peace Accords were no longer in effect. There were over 25,000 South Vietnamese casualties during the ceasefire period. Gerald Ford took over as US president in August 1974, and Congress cut financial aid to South Vietnam from $1 billion a year to $700 million. Congress voted funding restrictions to be phased in through 1975 and total cutoff in 1976.

The success of the 1973–74 dry season offensive inspired Trà to return to Hanoi in October 1974 and plead for a larger offensive the next dry season. This time, Trà could travel on a drivable highway with fueling stops, a vast change from when the Ho Chi Minh Trail was a dangerous mountain trek. Giáp, the North Vietnamese defense minister, was reluctant to approve Trà's plan since a large offensive might provoke US reaction and interfere with the big push planned for 1976. Trà appealed to Giáp's superior, Lê Duẩn, who approved it. Trà's plan called for a limited offensive from Cambodia into Phước Long province. The strike was designed to solve logistical problems, gauge the reaction of South Vietnamese forces, and determine whether the US would return. On 13 December 1974, PAVN forces attacked Phước Long. Phuoc Binh fell on 6 January 1975. Ford desperately asked Congress for funds to assist and re-supply the South before it was overrun. Congress refused. The fall of Phuoc Binh and lack of American response left the South Vietnamese elite demoralized.

The speed of this success led the Politburo to reassess. It decided operations in the Central Highlands would be turned over to General Văn Tiến Dũng and Pleiku should be seized, if possible. Dũng said to Lê Duẩn: "Never have we had military and political conditions so perfect or a strategic advantage as great as we have now." At the start of 1975, the South Vietnamese had three times as much artillery and twice as many tanks and armored vehicles as the PAVN. However, heightened oil prices meant many assets could not be used. Moreover, the rushed nature of Vietnamization, intended to cover US retreat, resulted in lack of spare parts, ground-crew, and maintenance personnel, which rendered most of it inoperable.

=== Campaign 275 ===
The capture of Hue, March 1975

On 10 March 1975, Dũng launched Campaign 275, a limited offensive into the Central Highlands, supported by tanks and heavy artillery. The target was Ban Ma Thuột; its capture would expose the provincial capital Pleiku and the coastal route for a planned 1976 campaign. The ARVN collapsed, again surprising Hanoi with the speed of its advance. Dũng urged the Politburo to allow him to seize Pleiku immediately and turn his attention to Kon Tum. He argued that with two months of good weather until the monsoon, it would be irresponsible not to take advantage.

Thiệu ordered the abandonment of the Central Highlands and less defensible positions in a rushed policy described as "light at the top, heavy at the bottom". While most ARVN forces attempted to flee, isolated units fought desperately. ARVN general Phu abandoned Pleiku and Kon Tum and retreated toward the coast, in the "convoy of tears". On 20 March, Thiệu reversed himself and ordered Huế, Vietnam's third-largest city, held at all costs, and then changed policy several times. As the PAVN attacked, panic set in, and ARVN resistance withered. On 22 March, the PAVN attacked Huế. By 30 March 100,000 leaderless ARVN troops surrendered as the PAVN marched through Da Nang. With the fall of the city, the defense of the Central Highlands and Northern provinces ended.

=== Final North Vietnamese offensive ===
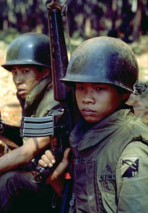
South Vietnamese soldiers during the battle of Xuân Lộc, April 1975

With the north half of the country under their control, the Politburo ordered Dũng to launch the final offensive. The operational plan for the Ho Chi Minh Campaign called for Saigon's capture before 1 May. Hanoi wished to avoid the monsoon and prevent redeployment of ARVN forces defending the capital. PAVN forces, their morale boosted by recent victories, rolled on, taking Nha Trang, Cam Ranh and Da Lat.

On 7 April, three PAVN divisions attacked Xuân Lộc, 40 miles (64 km) northeast of Saigon. Fighting raged as the ARVN defenders made a last stand to block PAVN advance. On 21 April however, the exhausted garrison was ordered to withdraw towards Saigon. An embittered and tearful Thiệu resigned, declaring that the US had betrayed South Vietnam. He suggested Kissinger had tricked him into signing the Paris Accords, promising military aid that failed to materialize. Having transferred power to Trần Văn Hương on 21 April, he left for Taiwan. After having appealed unsuccessfully to Congress for $722 million in emergency aid for South Vietnam, Ford gave a televised speech on 23 April, declaring an end to the war and US aid.

By the end of April, the ARVN had collapsed except in the Mekong Delta. Refugees streamed southward, ahead of the PAVN onslaught. By 27 April, 100,000 PAVN troops encircled Saigon. The city was defended by about 30,000 ARVN troops. To hasten a collapse and foment panic, the PAVN shelled Tan Son Nhut Airport and forced its closure. Large numbers of civilians had no way out.

=== Fall of Saigon ===
Victorious PAVN troops at the Presidential Palace, Saigon

Martial law was declared as American helicopters began evacuating South Vietnamese, US and foreign nationals from Tan Son Nhut and the embassy compound. Operation Frequent Wind had been delayed until the last possible moment, because of Ambassador Graham Martin's belief Saigon could be held and a political settlement reached. Frequent Wind was the largest helicopter evacuation in history. In the morning of 30 April, the last US Marines evacuated the embassy by helicopter, as civilians swamped the perimeter and poured into the grounds.

PAVN troops entered Saigon and overcame all resistance, capturing key buildings and installations. Tanks from the 2nd Corps crashed through the gates of the Independence Palace and the VC flag was raised above it. President Dương Văn Minh, who had succeeded Huong two days earlier, surrendered to Lieutenant colonel Bùi Văn Tùng, political commissar of the 203rd Tank Brigade. Minh was escorted to Radio Saigon to announce the surrender. The statement was on air at 2:30 pm.

== Opposition to US involvement ==
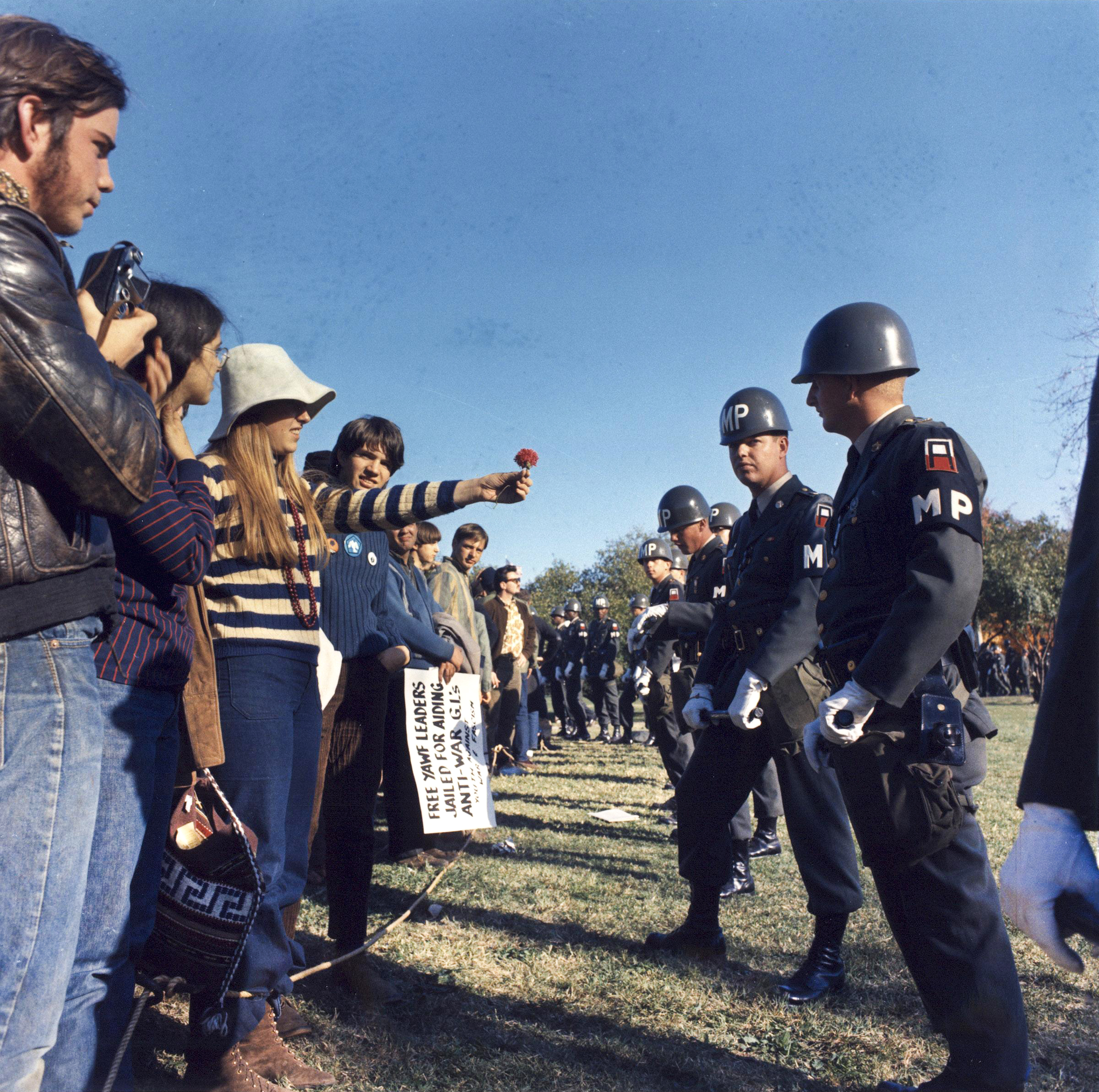
The 1967 March on the Pentagon, an antiwar demonstration organized by the National Mobilization Committee to End the War in Vietnam

During the war, opposition to US involvement increased among segments of the American public, although many did not identify with the antiwar movement. In January 1967, 32% of Americans thought the US had made a mistake in sending troops. Opinion steadily turned following 1967 and by 1970, 60% believed the US had made a mistake. Many young people opposed US involvement because they were being drafted, others because the antiwar movement grew popular among the counterculture. Opposition to the war tended to unite groups opposed to US anticommunism and imperialism, and for those involved with the New Left.

High-profile opposition increasingly turned to mass protests to shift opinion. Riots broke out at the 1968 Democratic National Convention. After reports of American military abuses brought attention and support to the antiwar movement, some veterans joined Vietnam Veterans Against the War. In October 1969, the Vietnam Moratorium attracted millions. The fatal shooting of students at Kent State University in 1970 led to nationwide university protests. Antiwar protests declined after the Paris Peace Accords, the end of the draft, and US troop withdrawal in 1973.

Polls indicated that the antiwar movement remained broadly unpopular even as support for the war declined. Historians remain divided over the extent of the movement's influence on the outcome of the conflict. Some have argued that growing public opposition to the war was driven primarily by its mounting human and economic costs and the perceived military stalemate, rather than by antiwar activism.

== Involvement of other countries ==
=== Pro-Hanoi ===
==== China ====
Beijing rally in support of Vietnamese communists against "US aggression"

Under the leadership of Mao Zedong, strategic security and ideology were the two main determinants of China's approach to the Indochina conflict. As Mao's emphasis shifted between these two factors over time, China's policy changed. In the First Indochina War, China became the Viet Minh's principal supporter, providing substantially more aid than the Soviet Union. China's enthusiastic response to Hồ's request for support reflected its leaders' belief that they had a mission to promote an Asian communist revolution modeled on China and to expand its defense parameter against Western powers.

At the 1954 Geneva Conference, Beijing, like Moscow, pressured the Viet Minh to accept Vietnam's temporary partition, wary of another direct confrontation with Washington. Between 1958 and 1969, however, China embraced an anti-revisionist stance and bolstered armed struggle in South Vietnam. From 1969 onward, national security and strategic considerations led China to adopt a more flexible foreign policy, seeking an alliance with the US against the Soviet Union. In 1974, China took advantage of its warming relations with the US and the decline of South Vietnam to seize the Paracel Islands.

China said its military and economic aid to North Vietnam totaled $160 billion (adjusted for 2022 prices); included were 5 million tons of food (equivalent to a year's production), accounting for 10–15% of the North's food supply by the 1970s. In the summer of 1962, Mao agreed to supply Hanoi with 90,000 rifles and other guns free of charge. Starting in 1965, China began sending anti-aircraft units and engineering battalions, to repair damage caused by American bombing. They helped man anti-aircraft batteries, rebuild roads and railroads, transport supplies, and perform other engineering works. This freed PAVN units for combat. China sent 320,000 troops and annual arms shipments worth $180 million. China claims to have caused 38% of American air losses. China began financing the Khmer Rouge as a counterweight to North Vietnam. China "armed and trained" the Khmer Rouge during the civil war, and continued to aid them afterward.

==== Soviet Union ====
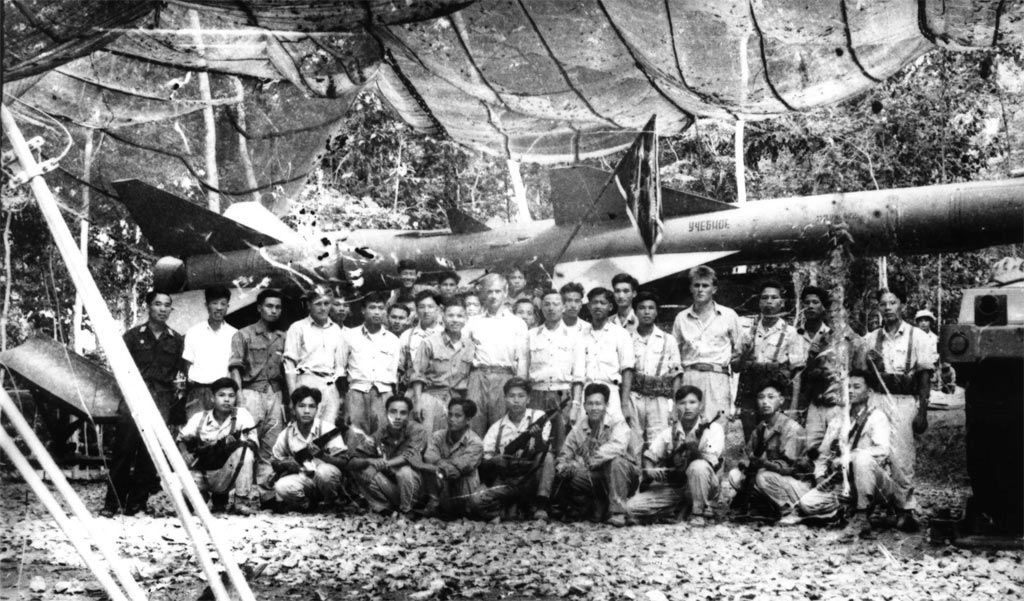
Soviet air defense instructors and North Vietnamese crewmen in the spring of 1965 at an air defense training center in Vietnam

Under the leadership of Nikita Khrushchev, the Soviet Union initially supported North Vietnam out of "fraternal solidarity". However, as the war escalated, Khrushchev urged the North Vietnamese leadership to give up the quest of liberating South Vietnam. After Khrushchev's ouster, his successor, Leonid Brezhnev, resumed aiding communist forces in Vietnam. Under Brezhnev, the Soviet Union would ultimately ship $450 million worth of arms annually to North Vietnam during the war.

Over the course of the conflict, the Soviet Union supplied North Vietnam with medical supplies, tanks, aircraft, artillery, anti-aircraft missiles and other military equipment. In 1965, Soviet crews fired Soviet-made surface-to-air missiles at US bombers. Similarly, Soviet pilots sometimes flew the planes supplied by their government. Following the dissolution of the Soviet Union in 1991, Russia acknowledged that the USSR had stationed up to 3,000 troops in Vietnam. 16 Soviet military personnel were killed during the war.

Between 1953 and 1991, the hardware donated by the Soviet Union included: 2,000 tanks; 1,700 APCs; 7,000 artillery guns; over 5,000 anti-aircraft guns; 158 surface-to-air missile launchers; and 120 helicopters. The Soviets sent North Vietnam annual arms shipments worth $450 million. From 1965 to 1974, fighting in Vietnam was observed by 11,000 military personnel of the Soviet Armed Forces. The KGB helped develop the signals intelligence capabilities of the North Vietnamese.

=== Pro-Saigon ===
Propaganda poster promoting Australian involvement

As South Vietnam was a protected state under a security treaty signed by Australia, France, New Zealand, Pakistan, the Philippines, Thailand, the UK, and the US, the treaty was invoked. The UK, France, and Pakistan did not contribute combat forces. South Korea and Taiwan were non-treaty participants.

== United Front for the Liberation of Oppressed Races ==
The ethnic minorities, like the Montagnards, Cham, and Khmer Krom, were actively recruited by both sides, with the VC particularly targeting Montagnard communities because of their strategic importance along infiltration routes. Some groups split off and formed the United Front for the Liberation of Oppressed Races (FULRO) to fight for autonomy. They fought both South Vietnamese and VC forces, then continued fighting the Socialist Republic of Vietnam after 1975.

== War crimes ==
Both sides committed numerous war crimes including rape, massacring civilians, bombings of civilian targets, terrorism, torture, and summarily executing prisoners of war. Other crimes included theft, arson, and the destruction of property not warranted by military necessity.

=== South Vietnamese, American and South Korean ===
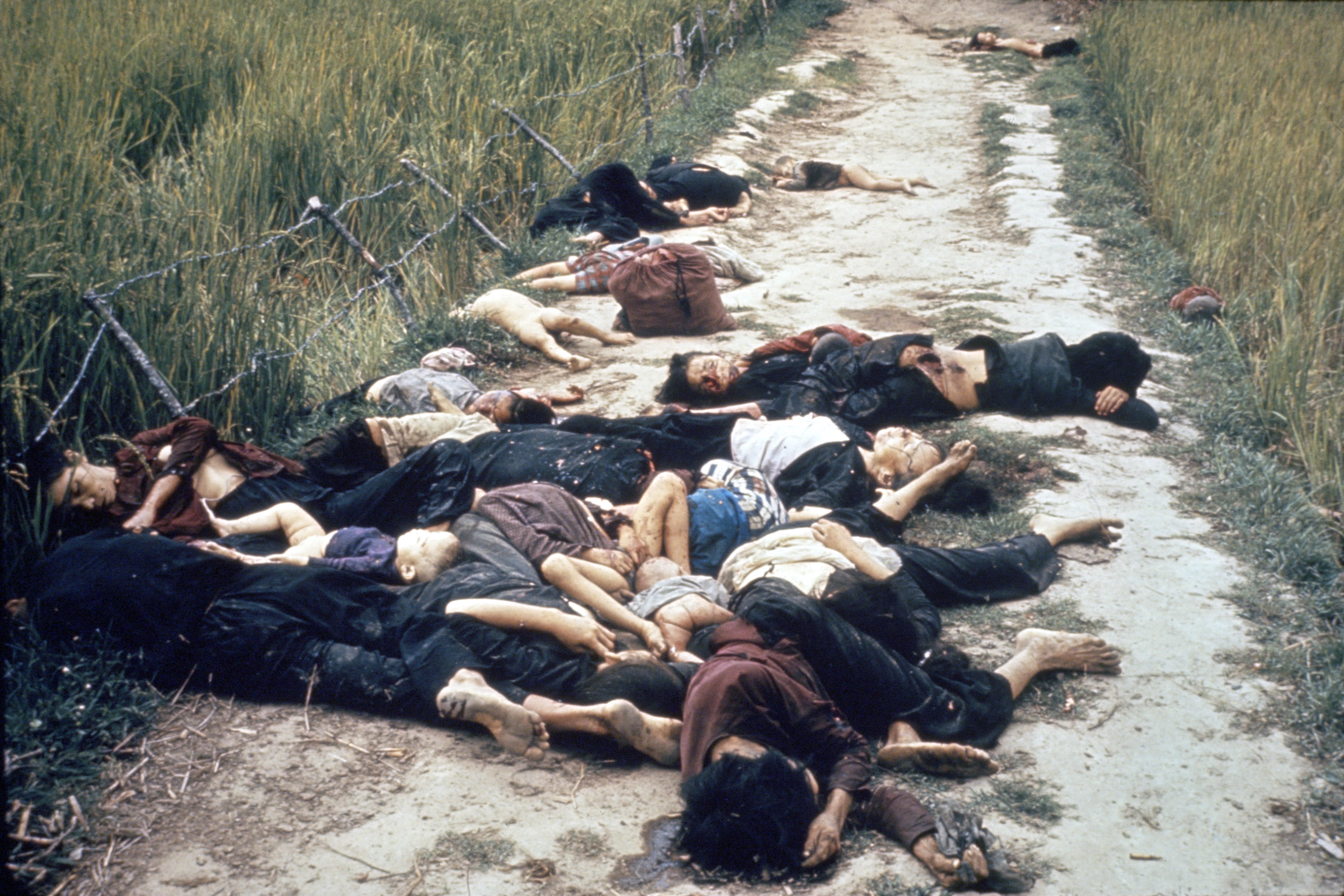
Victims of the My Lai massacre

In 1966, the Russell Tribunal was organized by public figures opposed to the war led by Bertrand Russell, to apply the precepts of international law. The tribunal found the US and allies guilty of acts of aggression, use of weapons forbidden by the laws of war, bombardment of targets of a purely civilian character, mistreatment of prisoners, and genocide. Though the tribunal's lack of juridical authority meant findings were ignored by the US and other governments, the hearings contributed to growing evidence which established the factual basis for a counter-narrative to US justifications for the war and inspired hearings, tribunals and legal investigations.

In 1968, the Vietnam War Crimes Working Group (VWCWG) was established by the Pentagon task force set up in the wake of the My Lai massacre, to ascertain the veracity of claims of US war crimes. Of the crimes reported to military authorities, sworn statements by witnesses and status reports indicated 320 incidents had a factual basis. The substantiated cases included seven massacres between 1967 and 1971 in which at least 137 civilians were killed; 78 further attacks targeting non-combatants resulting in at least 57 deaths and 15 sexually assaulted; and 141 cases of US soldiers torturing civilian detainees, or prisoners of war, with fists, sticks, bats, water or electric shock. Journalists have documented uninvestigated war crimes, involving every active army division, including atrocities committed by Tiger Force. R. J. Rummel estimated that American forces committed around 5,500 democidal killings between 1960 and 1972.

US forces established free-fire zones to prevent VC fighters from sheltering in South Vietnamese villages. Such practice, which involved the assumption that anyone appearing in the designated zones was an enemy that could be freely targeted, was regarded as "a severe violation of the laws of war". Nick Turse argues that a drive toward higher body counts, widespread use of free-fire zones, rules of engagement where civilians who ran from soldiers or helicopters could be viewed as VC and disdain for civilians, led to massive civilian casualties and war crimes. An example cited by Turse is Operation Speedy Express, described by John Paul Vann as "many Mỹ Lais". A report by Newsweek suggested at least 5,000 civilians may have been killed during the operation, and an official US military body count of 10,889 enemy combatants killed.

"The Terror of War" by Nick Ut, which won the 1973 Pulitzer Prize for Spot News Photography, showing a nine-year-old girl running down a road after being severely burned by napalm

Rummel estimated 39,000 democide deaths under Diệm and 50,000 during 1964–1975. Thus, the total for 1954–1975 is about 80,000 deaths caused by South Vietnam. Benjamin Valentino estimates 110,000–310,000 deaths as a "possible case" of "counter-guerrilla mass killings" by US and South Vietnamese forces. The Phoenix Program, coordinated by the CIA, was aimed at destroying the political infrastructure of the VC. The program killed 26,000–41,000 people, an unknown number were innocent civilians.

Torture and ill-treatment were frequently applied by the South Vietnamese to POWs, as well as civilian prisoners. During their visit to the Con Son Prison in 1970, congressmen Augustus Hawkins and William R. Anderson witnessed detainees either confined in minute "tiger cages" or chained to their cells, and provided with poor-quality food. American doctors found inmates suffering symptoms resulting from torture. During their visits to US detention facilities, the International Red Cross recorded many cases of torture and inhumane treatment. Torture was conducted by the South Vietnamese in collusion with the CIA. Unlike massacres such as My Lai, media reports of torture of POWs by anticommunist forces did not generate significant public outcry in the US.

South Korean forces were accused of war crimes. One event was the 1968 Phong Nhị and Phong Nhất massacre where the 2nd Marine Brigade reportedly killed about 70 civilians. South Korean forces are accused of perpetrating the Bình Hòa massacre, Binh Tai massacre and Hà My massacre.

=== North Vietnamese and Viet Cong ===
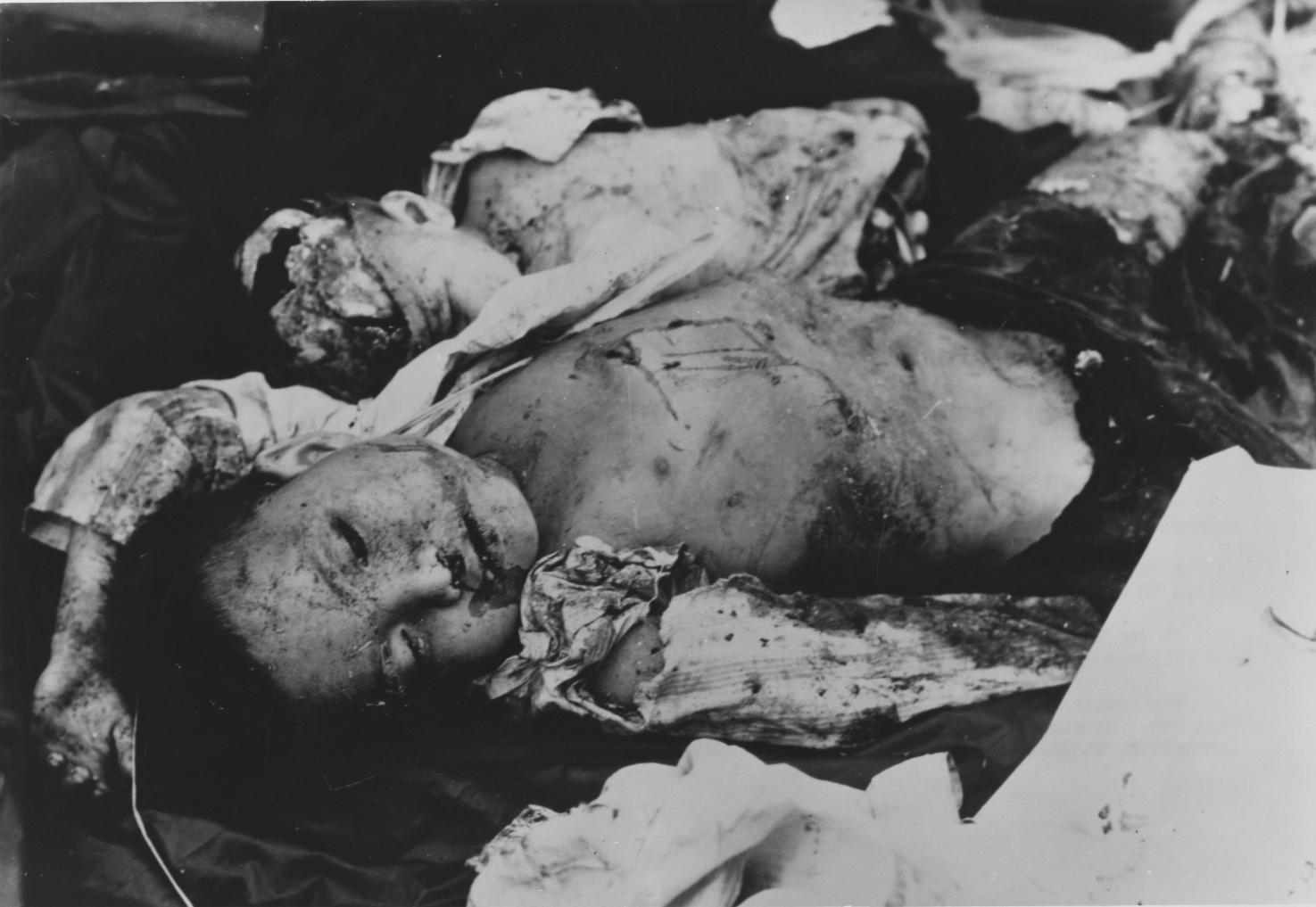
Victims killed in a Viet Cong mine explosion in Phú Yên, 1965

"The overall volume and lethality of Viet Cong terrorism rivals or exceeds all but a handful of terrorist campaigns waged over the last third of the twentieth century", based on the definition of terrorists as a non-state actor, and examining targeted killings and civilian deaths which are estimated at over 18,000 from 1966 to 1969. The Pentagon estimates the VC/PAVN conducted 36,000 murders and 58,000 kidnappings from 1967 to 1972, c. 1973. Benjamin Valentino attributes 45,000–80,000 "terrorist mass killings" to the VC. Statistics for 1968–72 suggest "about 80 percent of the terrorist victims were ordinary civilians and only about 20 percent were government officials, policemen, members of the self-defence forces or pacification cadres".

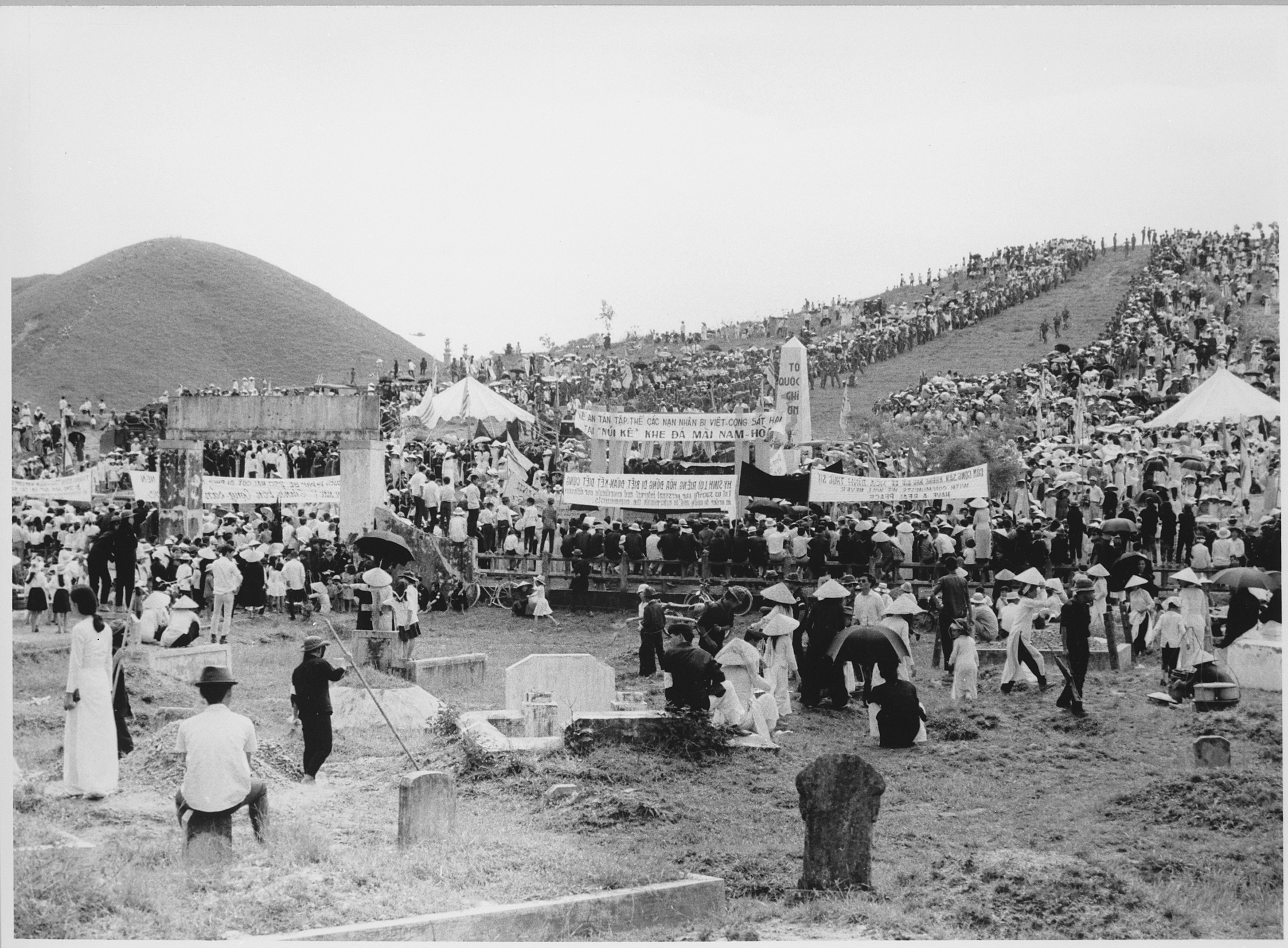
Funeral services in 1969 for victims of the Huế massacre

The VC also used terror to spread and maintain their control on the countryside. Max Hastings writes that two-thirds of the VC's general support stemmed from fear. For example, in 1960, VC cadres summarily executed alleged "traitors" with machetes, live burial, and beheadings. In one case, they disemboweled a village mayor and his wife, while also beheading his children.

VC tactics included frequent mortaring of civilians in refugee camps, and placing of mines on highways frequented by villagers taking goods to urban markets. Some mines were set only to go off after heavy vehicle passage, causing slaughter aboard packed buses.

Notable VC atrocities include the massacre of over 3,000 unarmed civilians at Huế and killing 252 Montagnard civilians during the Đắk Sơn massacre. 155,000 refugees fleeing the North Vietnamese Spring Offensive were reported to have been killed, or abducted, on the road to Tuy Hòa in 1975. PAVN/VC troops killed 164,000 civilians in democide between 1954 and 1975 in South Vietnam. North Vietnam was known for its abusive treatment of American POWs, most notably in Hỏa Lò Prison (the 'Hanoi Hilton'), where torture was employed to extract confessions.

== Women ==
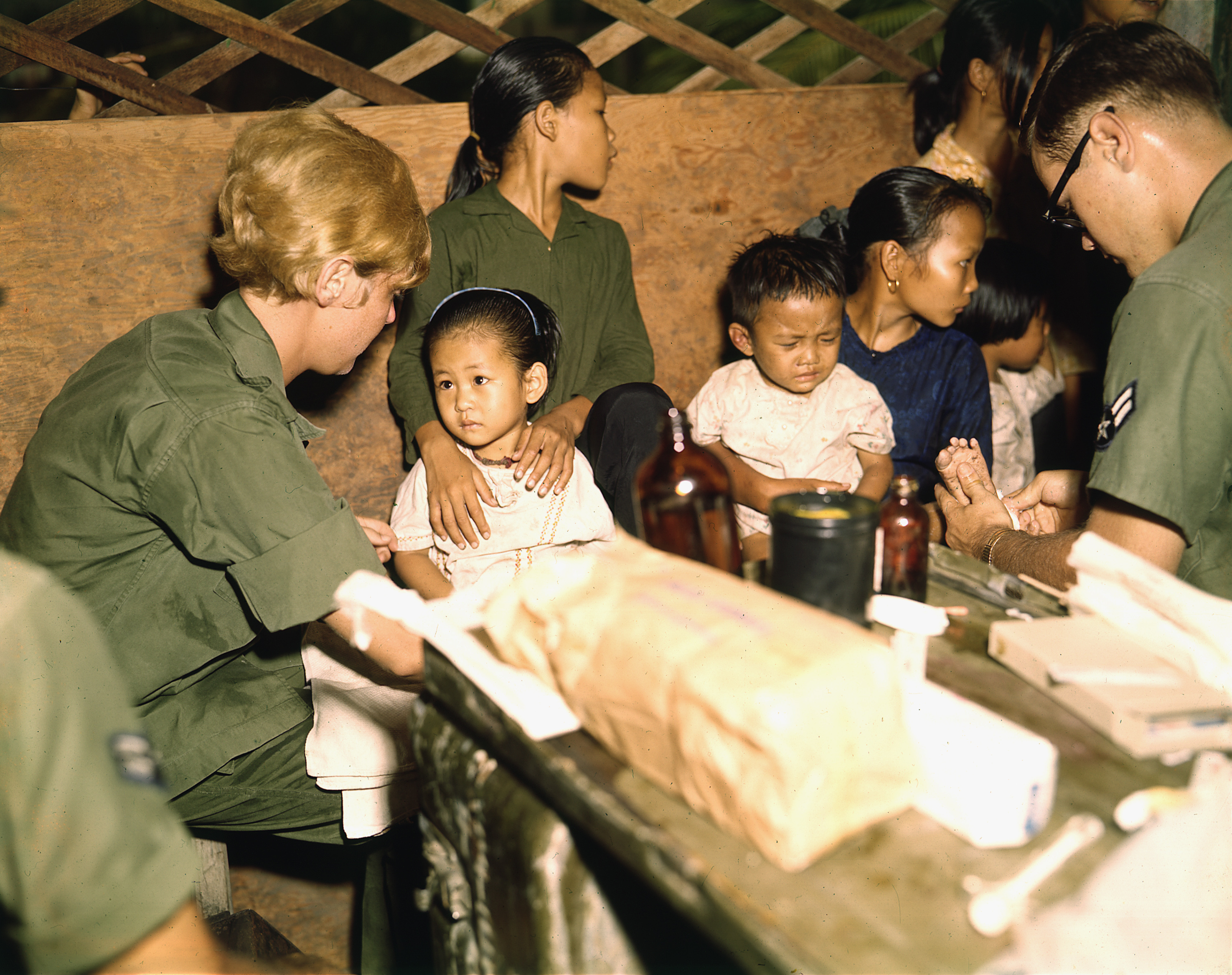
A nurse treats a Vietnamese child, 1967

Women were active in a variety of roles, making significant impacts and the war having significant impacts on them. Several million Vietnamese women served in the military and militias, particularly in the VC, with the slogan "when war comes, even the women must fight" widely used. These women made vital contributions on the Ho Chi Minh Trail, espionage, medical care, logistical and administrative work, and direct combat. Women took on more roles in the economy and Vietnam saw an increase in women's rights. Women emerged as leaders of anti-war campaigns and made significant contributions to war journalism.

Women still faced discrimination, and were targets of sexual violence and war crimes. Post-war, Vietnamese women veterans faced difficulty reintegrating into society and having their contributions recognized, as well as advances in rights failing to be sustained. Portrayals of the war have been criticized for their depictions of women, for overlooking the role women played and reducing Vietnamese women to racist stereotypes. Women are at the forefront of campaigns to deal with the war's aftermath, such as the effect of Agent Orange use and the Lai Đại Hàn.

== Black servicemen ==
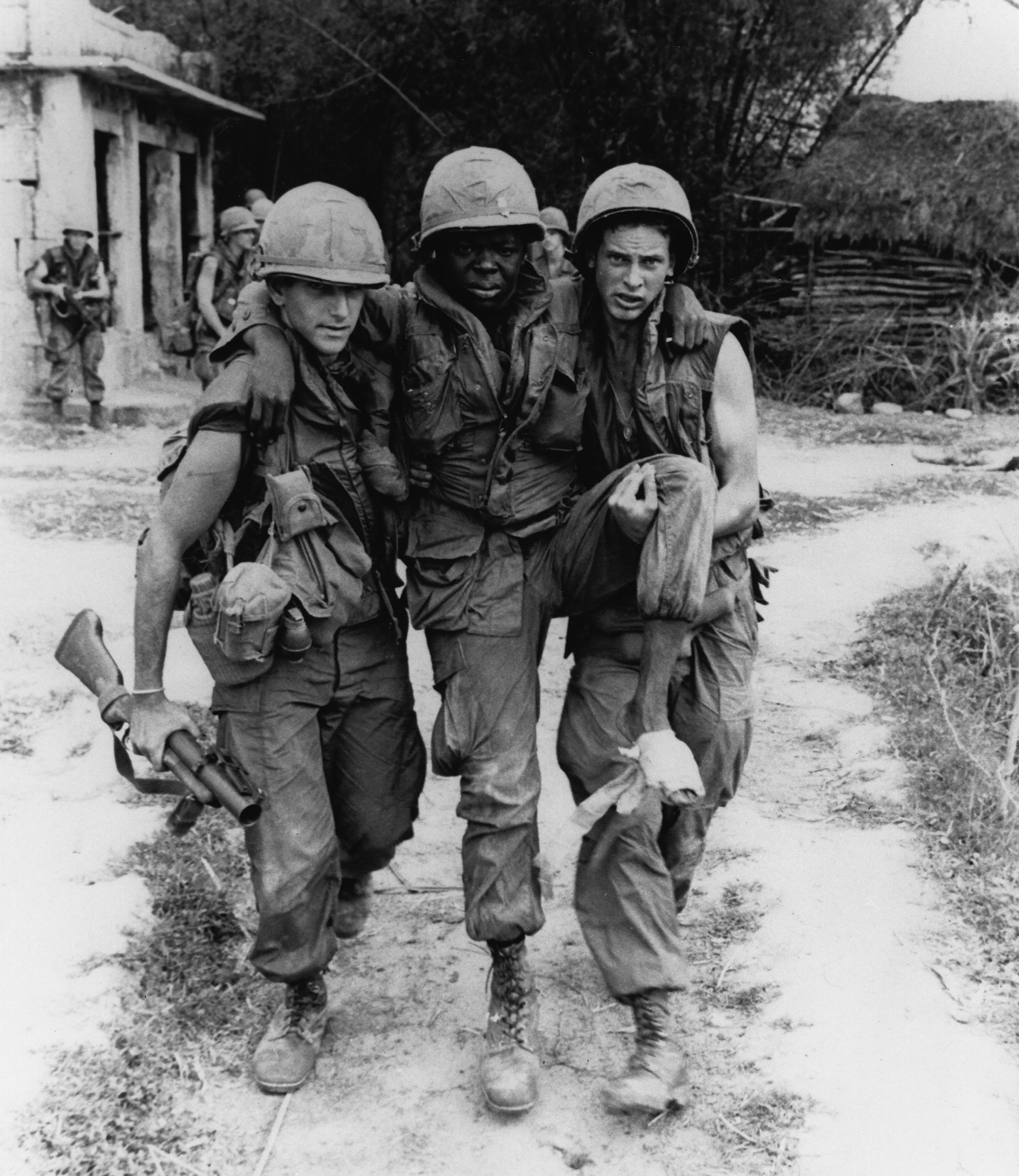
A wounded Black American soldier being evacuated during the My Lai Massacre

The experience of Black American military personnel has received significant attention. Wallace Terry's work includes observations about the impacts on black servicemen. He notes the higher proportion of combat casualties among African-American servicemen, the shift toward and different attitudes of black military volunteers and conscripts, the discrimination encountered "on the battlefield, in decorations, promotion and duty assignments", as well as having to endure "the racial insults, cross-burnings and Confederate flags of their white comrades"—and the experiences faced by black soldiers stateside, during the war and afterwards.

Civil rights leaders protested the disproportionate casualties and overrepresentation in hazardous duty experienced by black servicemen, prompting reforms implemented from 1967. As a result, by the war's completion, black casualties had declined to 13% of combat deaths, about equal to the share of draft-eligible black men, though slightly higher than the 10% who served.

== Weapons ==
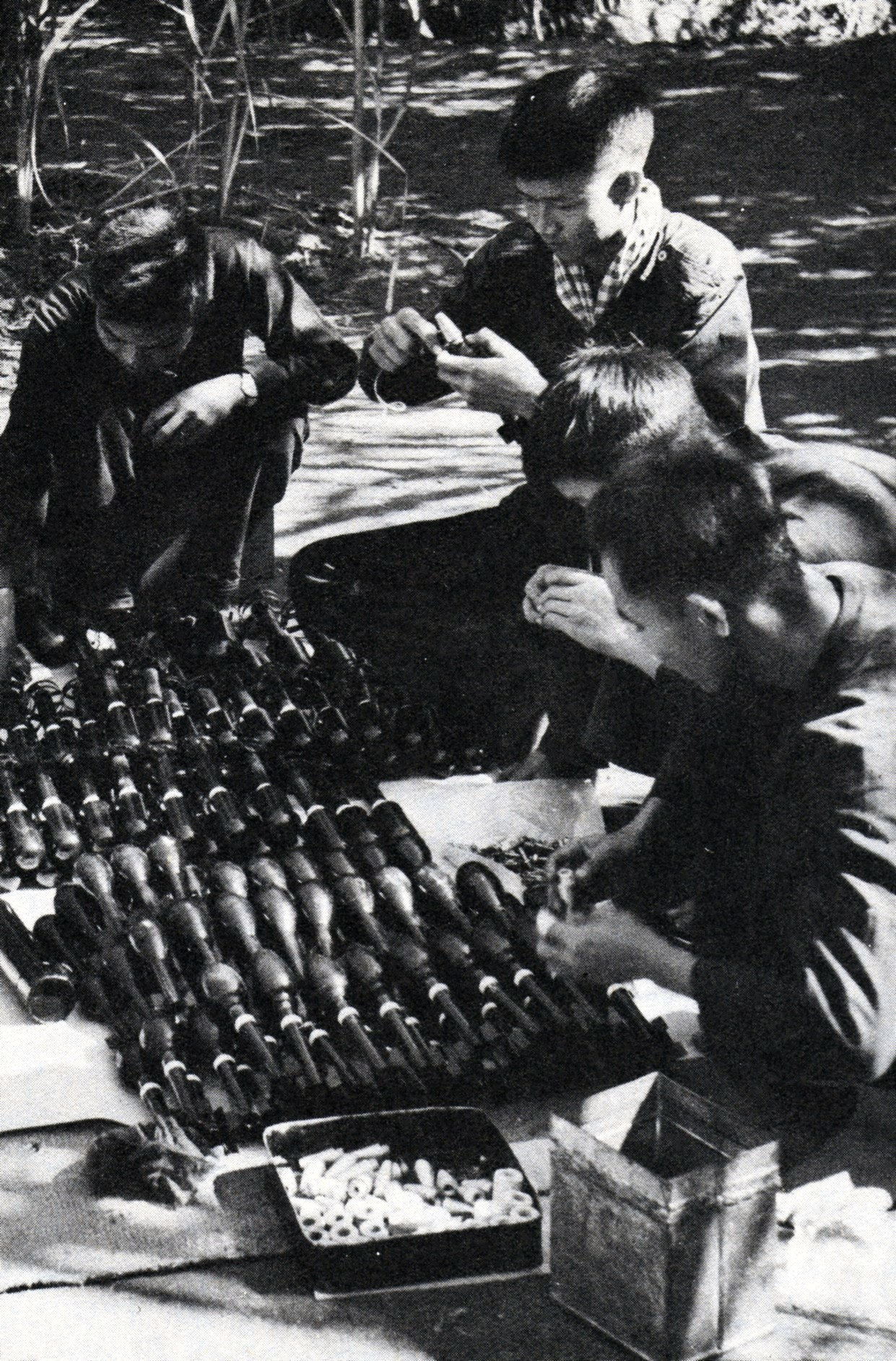
Guerrillas assemble shells and rockets delivered along the Ho Chi Minh Trail.

Nearly all US-allied forces were armed with US weapons including the M1 Garand, M1 carbine, M14 rifle, and M16 rifle. The Australian and New Zealand forces employed the 7.62 mm L1A1 Self-Loading Rifle, with occasional use of the M16 rifle.

The PAVN/VC, although having inherited US, French, and Japanese weapons from World War II and the First Indochina War, were largely armed and supplied by China, the Soviet Union, and its Warsaw Pact allies. Some weapons—notably anti-personnel explosives, the K-50M, and "home-made" versions of the RPG-2—were manufactured in North Vietnam. By 1969 the US Army had identified 40 rifle/carbine types, 22 machine gun types, 17 types of mortar, 20 recoilless rifle or rocket launcher types, nine types of antitank weapons, and 14 anti-aircraft artillery weapons used by ground troops on all sides. Also in use, mostly by anti-communist forces, were 24 types of armored vehicles and self-propelled artillery, and 26 types of field artillery and rocket launchers.

== Casualties ==
Military deaths (1955–1975)
Year	US	South Vietnam
1956–1959	4	n.a.
1960	5	2,223
1961	16	4,004
1962	53	4,457
1963	122	5,665
1964	216	7,457
1965	1,928	11,242
1966	6,350	11,953
1967	11,363	12,716
1968	16,899	27,915
1969	11,780	21,833
1970	6,173	23,346
1971	2,414	22,738
1972	759	39,587
1973	68	27,901
1974	1	31,219
1975	62	n.a.
After 1975	7	n.a.
Total	58,220	>254,256

Casualty estimates vary, with one source suggesting up to 3.8 million violent war deaths in Vietnam between 1955 and 2002. A demographic study calculated 791,000–1,141,000 war-related deaths for all Vietnam, military and civilians. Between 195,000 and 430,000 South Vietnamese civilians died. Guenter Lewy estimated 65,000 North Vietnamese civilians died. Estimates of civilian deaths caused by American bombing of North Vietnam range from 30,000 to 182,000. A 1975 US Senate subcommittee estimated 1.4 million South Vietnamese civilians casualties, including 415,000 deaths. The military of South Vietnam suffered an estimated 254,000 killed between 1960 and 1974, and additional deaths between 1954 and 1959, and in 1975. Other estimates point to higher figures of 313,000 casualties.

The US Department of Defense figure for PAVN/VC killed from 1965 to 1974 was 950,765. Officials believed these need to be deflated by 30 percent. Lewy asserts that one-third of the reported "enemy" killed may have been civilians, concluding the figure was closer to 440,000.

According to Vietnamese government figures in 2013, there were 849,018 confirmed military deaths on the PAVN/VC side, for the period of 1955–1975. An additional 232,000 personnel were estimated to be missing, and 463,000 were estimated to be wounded. According to a 2015 official publication, communist forces had an estimated 1.1 million deaths and 300,000 personnel missing during the war.

US reports of "enemy KIA", referred to as body count, were subject to "falsification and glorification", and a true estimate of PAVN/VC combat deaths is difficult to assess, as US victories were assessed by having a "greater kill ratio". It was difficult to distinguish between civilians and military personnel in the VC, as many were part-time guerrillas or impressed laborers who did not wear uniforms and civilians killed were sometimes written off as enemy killed, because high enemy casualties was directly tied to promotions and commendation.

Between 275,000–310,000 Cambodians died, including 50,000–150,000 combatants and civilians from US bombings. 20,000–62,000 Laotians died, and 58,281 US military personnel were killed, of which 1,584 are still listed missing as of 2021.

== Aftermath ==
=== In Southeast Asia ===
==== In Vietnam ====
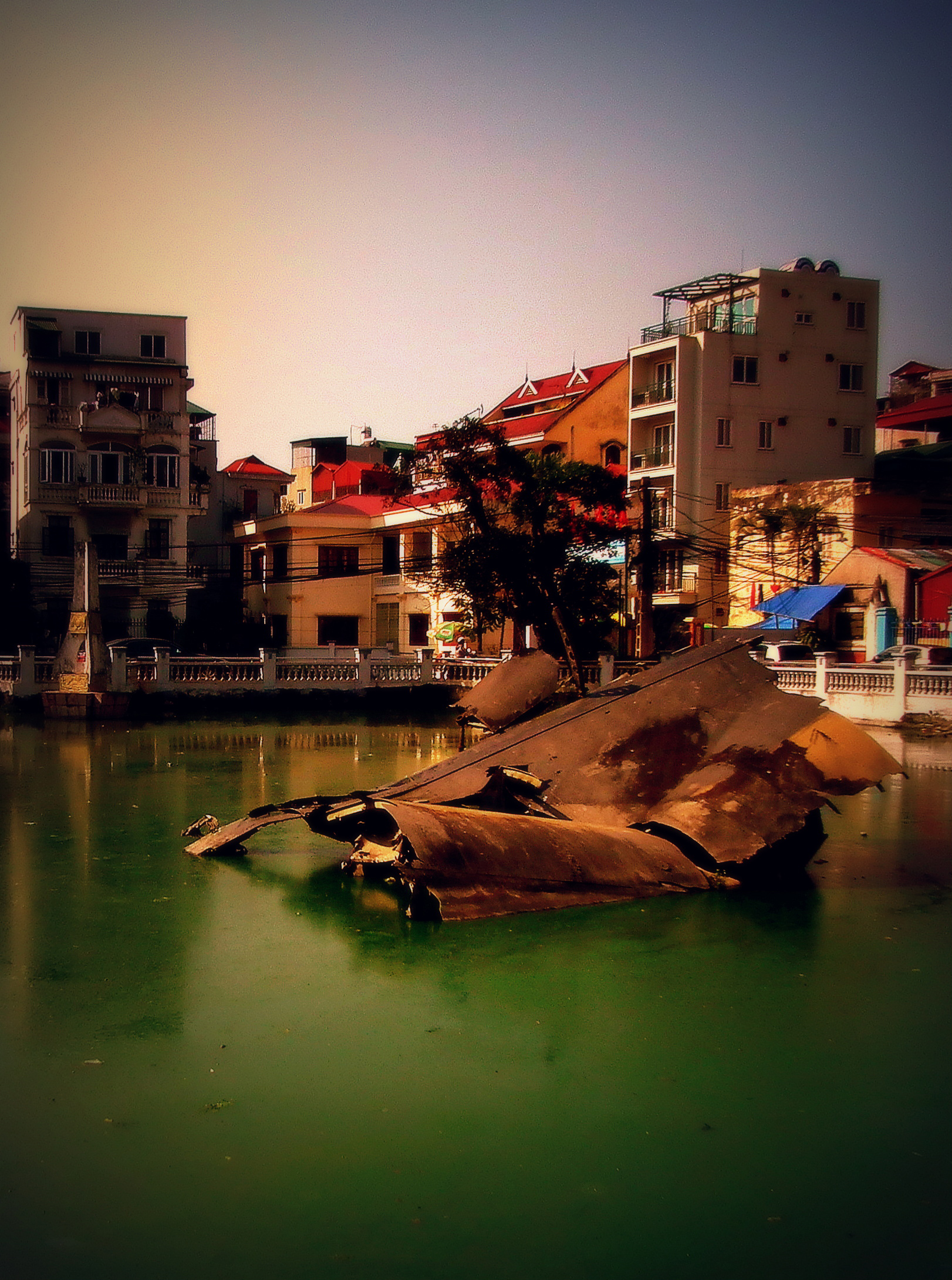
B-52 wreckage in Huu Tiep Lake, Hanoi. Downed during Operation Linebacker II, its remains have been turned into a war monument.

In July 1976, North and South Vietnam were merged to form the Socialist Republic of Vietnam. Despite speculation the victorious North Vietnamese would, in Nixon's words, "massacre the civilians there [South Vietnam] by the millions", no mass executions happened. (Note: A study by Jacqueline Desbarats and Karl D. Jackson estimated that 65,000 South Vietnamese were executed for political reasons between 1975 and 1983, based on a survey of 615 Vietnamese refugees who claimed to have personally witnessed 47 executions. However, "their methodology was reviewed and criticized as invalid by authors Gareth Porter and James Roberts". Sixteen of the 47 names used to extrapolate this "bloodbath" were duplicates; this extremely high duplication rate (34%) strongly suggests Desbarats and Jackson were drawing from a small number of total executions. Rather than arguing that this duplication rate proves there were very few executions in post-war Vietnam, Porter and Roberts suggest it is an artifact of the self-selected nature of the participants in the Desbarats-Jackson study, as the authors followed subjects' recommendations on other refugees to interview. Nevertheless, there exist unverified reports of mass executions.)

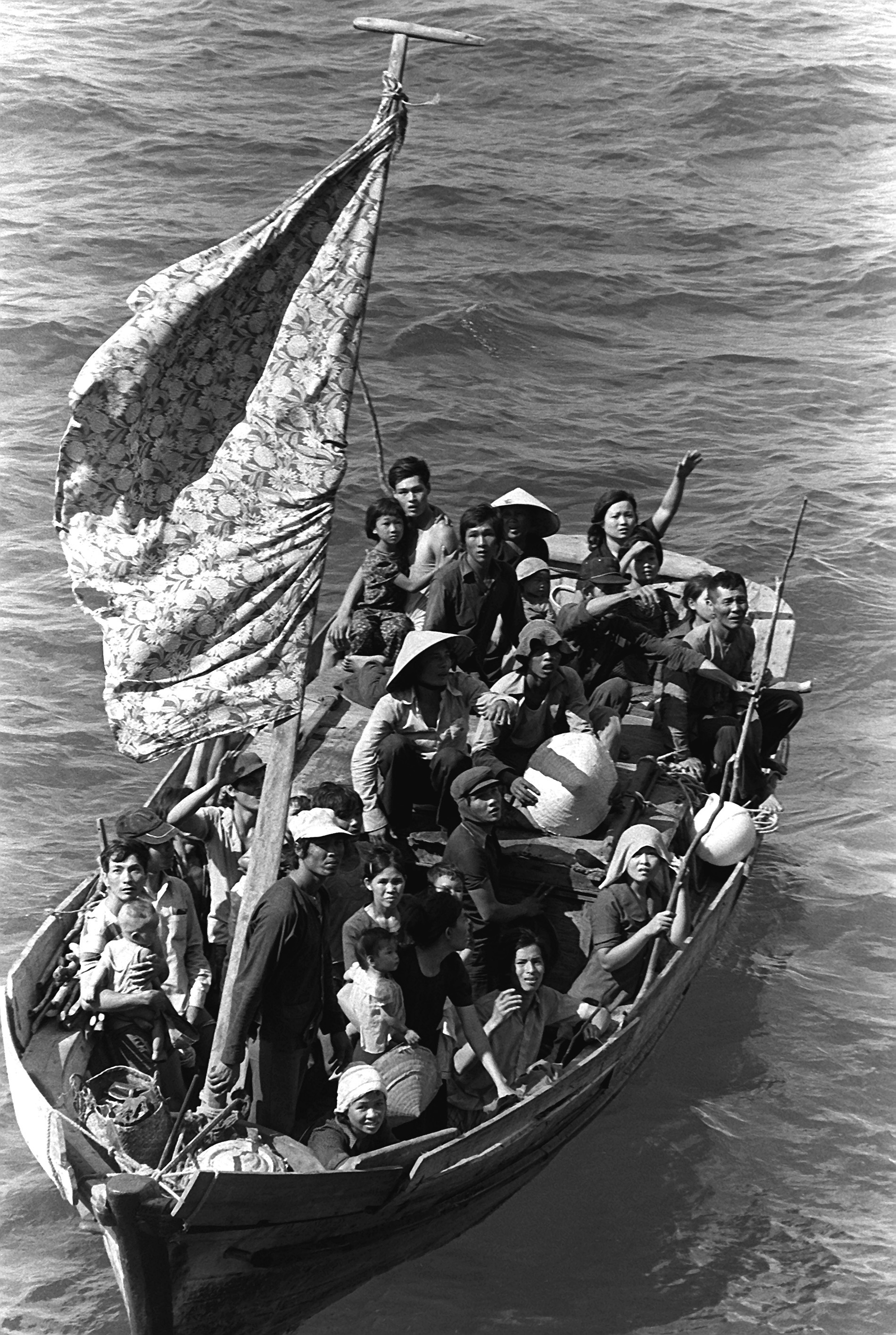
Vietnamese refugees fleeing Vietnam, 1984

However, many South Vietnamese were sent to re-education camps where they endured torture, starvation, and disease while forced to perform hard labor. The number involved varied depending on different observers: "50,000 to 80,000" (Le Monde, 1978), "150,000 to 200,000" (The Washington Post, 1978), and "300,000" (Agence France Presse from Hanoi, 1978). Such variations are because "Some estimates may include not only detainees but also people sent from the cities to the countryside." According to a native observer, 443,360 people had to register for a period in re-education camps in Saigon alone, and while some were released after a few days, others stayed for more than a decade. Between 1975 and 1980, more than 1 million northerners migrated south, to regions formerly in the Republic of Vietnam, while, as part of the New Economic Zones program, around 750,000 to over 1 million southerners were moved to mountainous forested areas.

Reports of human rights abuses in postwar Vietnam divided the American left, challenging the beliefs of those who had supported the communists, while several French left-wing intellectuals publicly reassessed their earlier support for Hanoi. Ideological steadfastness, overconfidence, and miscalculations by the communist leadership plunged Vietnam into more than a decade of difficulties, before the implementation of the reforms.

==== Refugee crisis ====
Over 3 million people left Vietnam, Laos, and Cambodia in the Indochina refugee crisis after 1975. Most Asian countries were unwilling to accept them, many fled by boat and were known as boat people. Between 1975 and 1998, an estimated 1.2 million refugees from Vietnam and other Southeast Asian countries resettled in the US, while Canada, Australia, and France resettled over 500,000, China accepted 250,000. Laos experienced the largest flight proportionally, 300,000 out of a population of 3 million crossed the border into Thailand. Included among them were "about 90%" of Laos' "intellectuals, technicians, and officials". According to author Nghia M. Vo and the United Nations High Commissioner for Refugees (UNHCR), between 200,000 and 250,000 boat people died at sea.

==== Cambodia and Laos ====
By 1975, the North Vietnamese had lost influence over the Khmer Rouge. Phnom Penh, Cambodia's capital, fell to the Khmer Rouge. Under Pol Pot, the Khmer Rouge would kill between one million and three million Cambodians from a population of 8 million.

The relationship between Vietnam and Democratic Kampuchea deteriorated. In response to the Khmer Rouge taking Phu Quoc and Tho Chu, and the belief they were responsible for the disappearance of 500 Vietnamese natives on Tho Chu, Vietnam launched a counterattack to recover the islands. After failed attempts to negotiate, Vietnam invaded Democratic Kampuchea in 1978 and ousted the Khmer Rouge, in the Cambodian–Vietnamese War. In response, China invaded Vietnam in 1979. The two countries fought the Sino-Vietnamese War. From 1978 to 1979, some 450,000 ethnic Chinese left Vietnam by boat as refugees, or were deported.

The Pathet Lao overthrew the monarchy of Laos in 1975, establishing the Lao People's Democratic Republic. The change in regime was "quite peaceful, a sort of Asiatic 'velvet revolution'"—although 30,000 former officials were sent to reeducation camps, often enduring harsh conditions.

==== Unexploded ordnance ====
The US dropped over 7 million tons of bombs on Indochina during the war, more than triple the 2.1 million tons it dropped on Europe and Asia during World War II, and ten times the amount during the Korean War. 500 thousand tons were dropped on Cambodia, 1 million tons on North Vietnam, and 4 million tons on South Vietnam. On a per person basis, the 2 million tons dropped on Laos make it the most heavily bombed country in history, "nearly a ton for every person in Laos". Due to the particularly heavy impact of cluster bombs, Laos was a strong advocate of the Convention on Cluster Munitions to ban them, and host to its first meeting in 2010.

Former US Air Force official Earl Tilford recounted "repeated bombing runs of a lake in central Cambodia. The B-52s literally dropped their payloads in the lake." The Air Force ran many missions like this to secure additional funding during budget negotiations, so the tonnage expended does not directly correlate with the resulting damage.

Unexploded ordnance, mostly from US bombing, continues to kill, and has rendered much land hazardous and impossible to cultivate. Ordnance has killed 42,000 people since the war. In Laos, 80 million unexploded bombs remain. Unexploded ordnance has killed or injured over 20,000 Laotians and about 50 people are killed or maimed annually. It is estimated the explosives will not be removed entirely for centuries.

=== In the United States ===
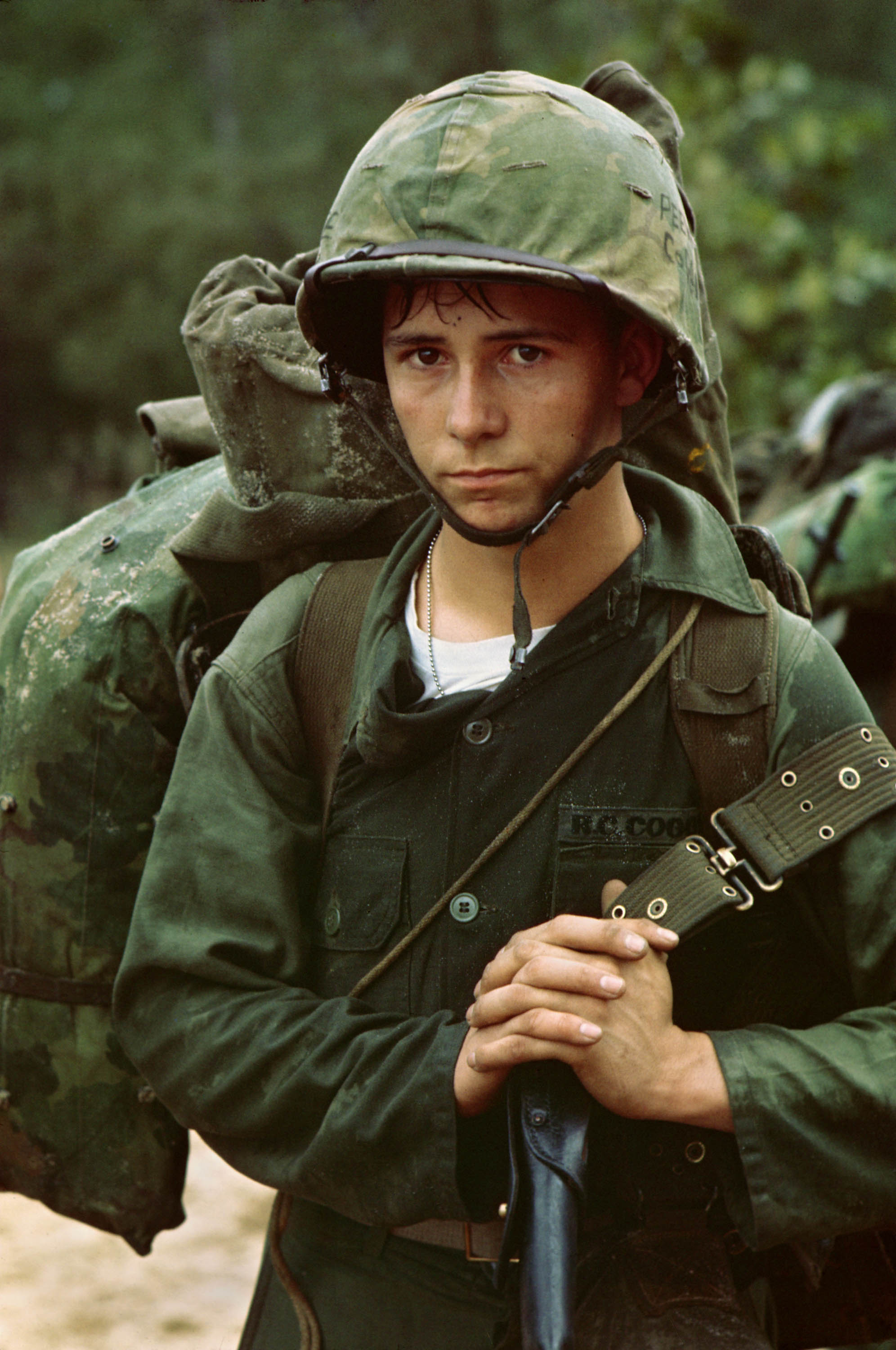
A young Marine private waits on the beach during the Marine landing, Da Nang, 3 August 1965

Failure of US goals is placed at different institutions and levels. Some have suggested it was due to failure of leadership. Others point to military doctrine. Secretary of Defense Robert McNamara stated that "the achievement of a military victory by U.S. forces ... was indeed a dangerous illusion". The inability to bring Hanoi to the bargaining table by bombing illustrated another US miscalculation, and the limitations of military abilities in achieving political goals. Army Chief of Staff Harold Keith Johnson noted, "if anything came out of Vietnam, it was that air power couldn't do the job". General William Westmoreland admitted bombing had been ineffective, saying he doubted "that the North Vietnamese would have relented". Kissinger wrote to President Ford that "in terms of military tactics ... our armed forces are not suited to this kind of war. Even the Special Forces who had been designed for it could not prevail." Hanoi persistently sought unification under communist rule, and the effects of US bombing had negligible impact on their goals. US bombing mobilized people throughout North Vietnam and internationally, due to a superpower attempting to bomb a society into submission.

Americans struggled to absorb the lessons of the military intervention. President Ronald Reagan coined the term "Vietnam syndrome" to describe the reluctance of the public and politicians to support military interventions abroad. US polling in 1978 revealed nearly 72% of Americans believed the war was "fundamentally wrong and immoral". Six months after the beginning of Operation Rolling Thunder, Gallup found 60% did not believe sending troops was a mistake in September 1965, and only 24% believed it was. Polling did not find a plurality believing it was a mistake until October 1967, and did not find a majority believing it was until August 1968, during the third phase of the Tet Offensive. Thereafter, Gallup found majorities believing it was a mistake through the signing of the Peace Accords in 1973, when 60% believed it was a mistake, and polls between 1990 and 2000, found 70% of Americans believed it was a mistake. The Vietnam War POW/MIA issue, concerning the fate of US service personnel missing in action, persisted. The costs loom large in American consciousness; a 1990 poll showed the public incorrectly believed more Americans died in Vietnam than World War II.

==== Financial cost ====
US expenditures in South Vietnam (1953–74) Direct costs only
Military costs	Military aid	Economic aid	Total	Total (2015 dollars)
$111 billion	$16 billion	$7 billion	$135 billion	$1 trillion

Between 1953 and 1975, the US was estimated to have spent $168 billion on the war (equivalent to $1.7 trillion in 2025). This resulted in a large budget deficit. Other figures point to $139 billion from 1965 to 1974 (not inflation-adjusted), 10 times education spending, and 50 times more than housing and community development. It was stated that war-spending could have paid every mortgage in the US, with money left over. As of 2013, the US government pays Vietnam veterans and their families more than $22 billion annually in war-related claims.

==== Impact on the US military ====
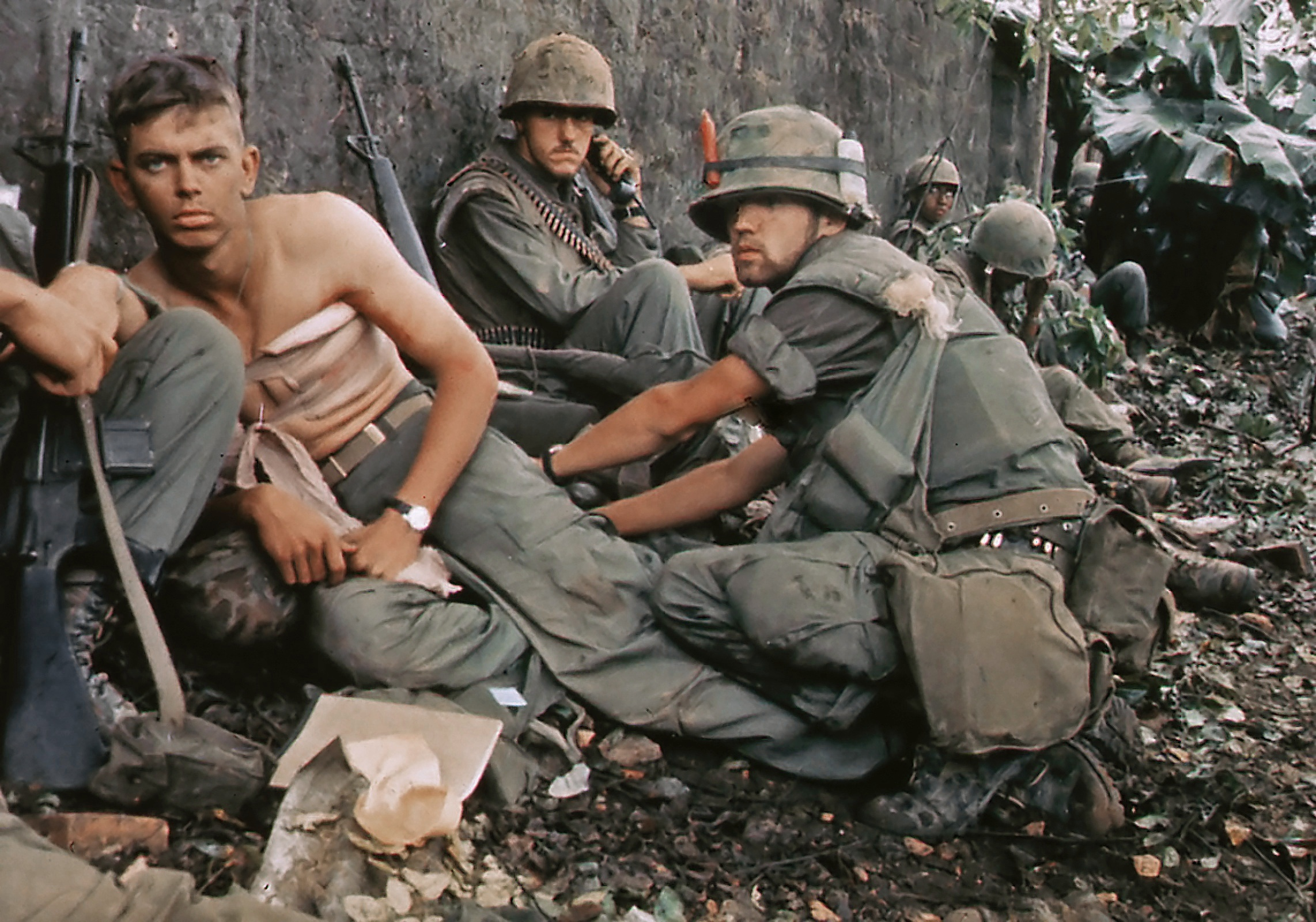
A marine gets his wounds treated during operations in Huế City, in 1968

More than 3 million Americans served, 1.5 million saw combat. "At the height of American involvement in 1968, for example, 543,400 American military personnel were stationed in Vietnam, but only 80,000 were ... combat troops." Conscription existed since World War II, but ended in 1973.

A total of 58,220 American soldiers were killed, 150,000 wounded, and at least 21,000 permanently disabled. The average age of troops killed was 23. Approximately 830,000 veterans, 15%, suffered posttraumatic stress disorder. Drug use, racial tensions, and fragging—attempts to kill officers—created problems for the military and impacted its capability, as did the 125,000 Americans who left for Canada to avoid the draft, and the approximately 50,000 servicemen who deserted. In 1977, President Jimmy Carter granted an unconditional pardon to Vietnam draft evaders with Proclamation 4483.

The war called into question army doctrine. Marine general Victor H. Krulak criticized Westmoreland's attrition strategy, calling it "wasteful of American lives ... with small likelihood of a successful outcome". Doubts surfaced about the military's ability to train foreign forces. There were found to be considerable flaws and dishonesty by commanders, due to promotions being tied to the body count system touted by Westmoreland and McNamara. Secretary of Defense McNamara wrote to President Johnson: "The picture of the world's greatest superpower killing or seriously injuring 1,000 noncombatants a week, while trying to pound a tiny backward nation into submission on an issue whose merits are hotly disputed, is not a pretty one."

=== Effects of US chemical defoliation ===
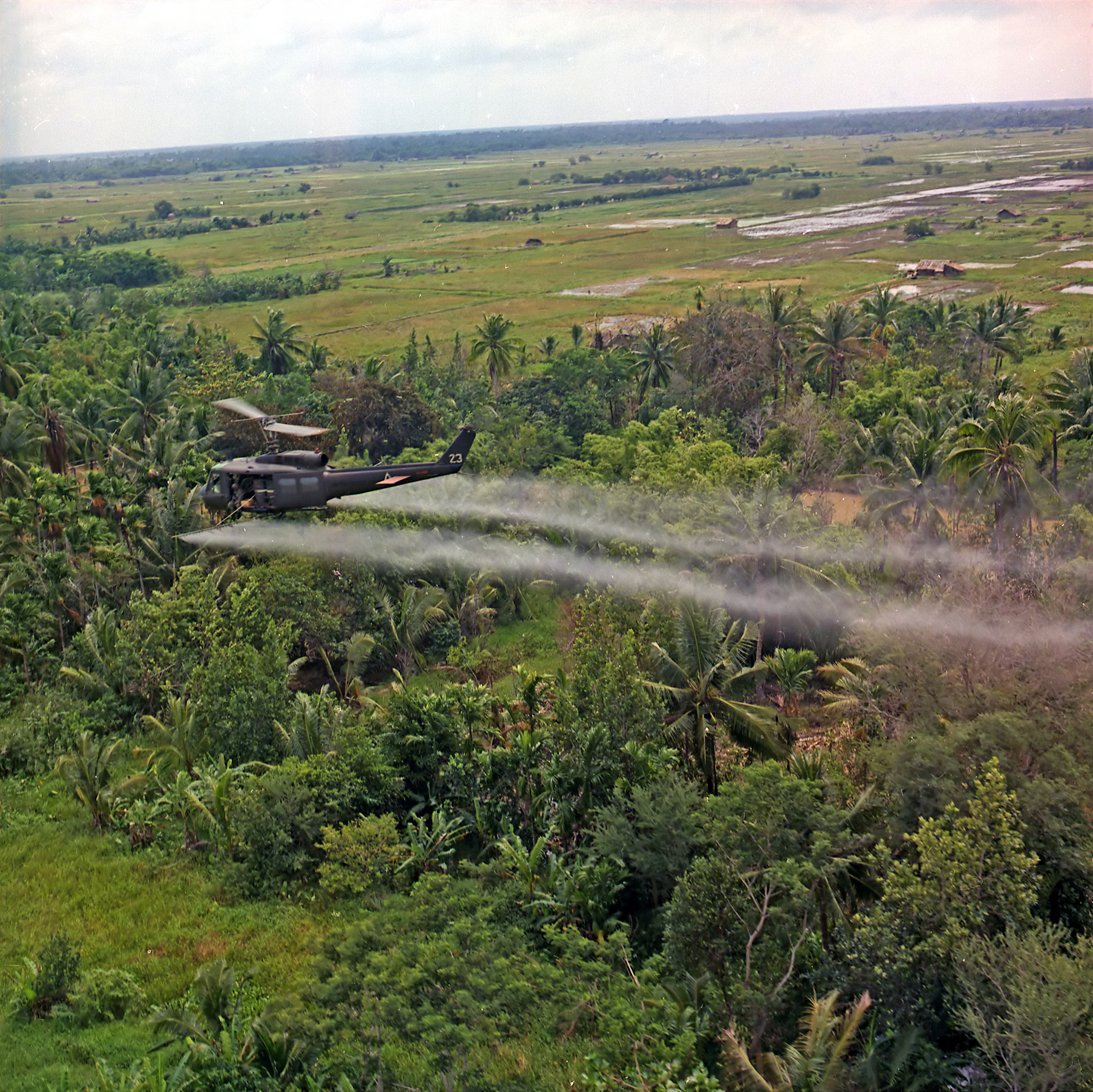
US helicopter spraying chemical defoliants in the Mekong Delta, South Vietnam, 1969

Another controversial aspect of the US effort was use of chemical defoliants between 1961 and 1971. 20 million gallons of toxic herbicides, like Agent Orange, were sprayed on 6 million acres of forests and crops. They were used to defoliate parts of the countryside to prevent the VC from hiding weaponry and encampments, and deprive them of food. Defoliation was used to clear sensitive areas, including base perimeters and ambush sites along roads and canals. The chemicals used continue to change the landscape, cause diseases and birth defects, and poison the foodchain, including suppressing the growth of some plants and crops and proceeding into the sediment, affecting fish and other species. US records have listed figures including the destruction of 20% of the jungles of South Vietnam and 20-36% of the mangrove forests.

The chemicals in Agent Orange pose health hazards, such as immune system disorders, developmental abnormalities, and issues with the reproductive system. Agent Orange and similar substances have caused many health issues for Vietnamese people and the US crews that handled them. Reports concluded that refugees exposed to sprays continued to experience pain in the eyes, skin and gastrointestinal upsets. In one study, 92% of participants suffered incessant fatigue; others reported monstrous births. Analysis has found significant correlation between having a parent who was exposed to Agent Orange with the likelihood of possessing or acting as a carrier of birth defects. The most common deformity appears to be spina bifida. There is substantial evidence defects carry on for three generations or more. In 2012, the US and Vietnam cooperated in cleaning toxic chemicals on Da Nang International Airport, marking the first time Washington has been involved in cleaning up Agent Orange in Vietnam. In 2018, Vietnam treated 150,000 cubic meters of contaminated soil.

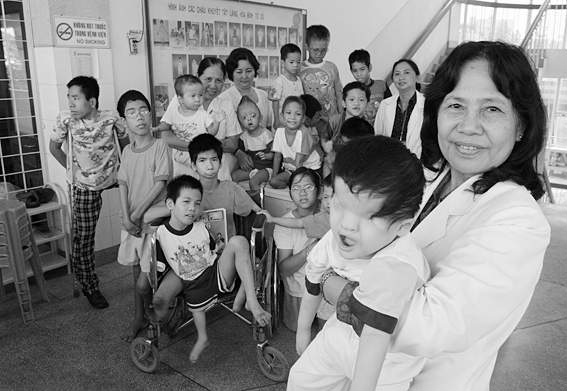
Handicapped children in Vietnam, most of them victims of Agent Orange, 2004

Vietnamese victims attempted a class action lawsuit against Dow Chemical and other US chemical manufacturers, but a US District Court dismissed their case. As of 2006, the Vietnamese government estimated there were over 4,000,000 victims of dioxin poisoning in Vietnam, while the Vietnamese Red Cross estimates up to one million people have health problems or disabilities as a result of Agent Orange. The US has described these figures as unreliable, and denied conclusive scientific links between Agent Orange and Vietnamese victims of dioxin poisoning. In parts of southern Vietnam, dioxin levels remain at over 100 times the accepted international standard.

The US Veterans Administration has listed prostate cancer, respiratory cancers, multiple myeloma, type 2 diabetes, B-cell lymphomas, soft-tissue sarcoma, chloracne, porphyria cutanea tarda, peripheral neuropathy as "presumptive diseases associated with exposure to Agent Orange or other herbicides during military service". Spina bifida is the sole birth defect in children of veterans recognized as caused by exposure to Agent Orange.

=== In popular culture ===
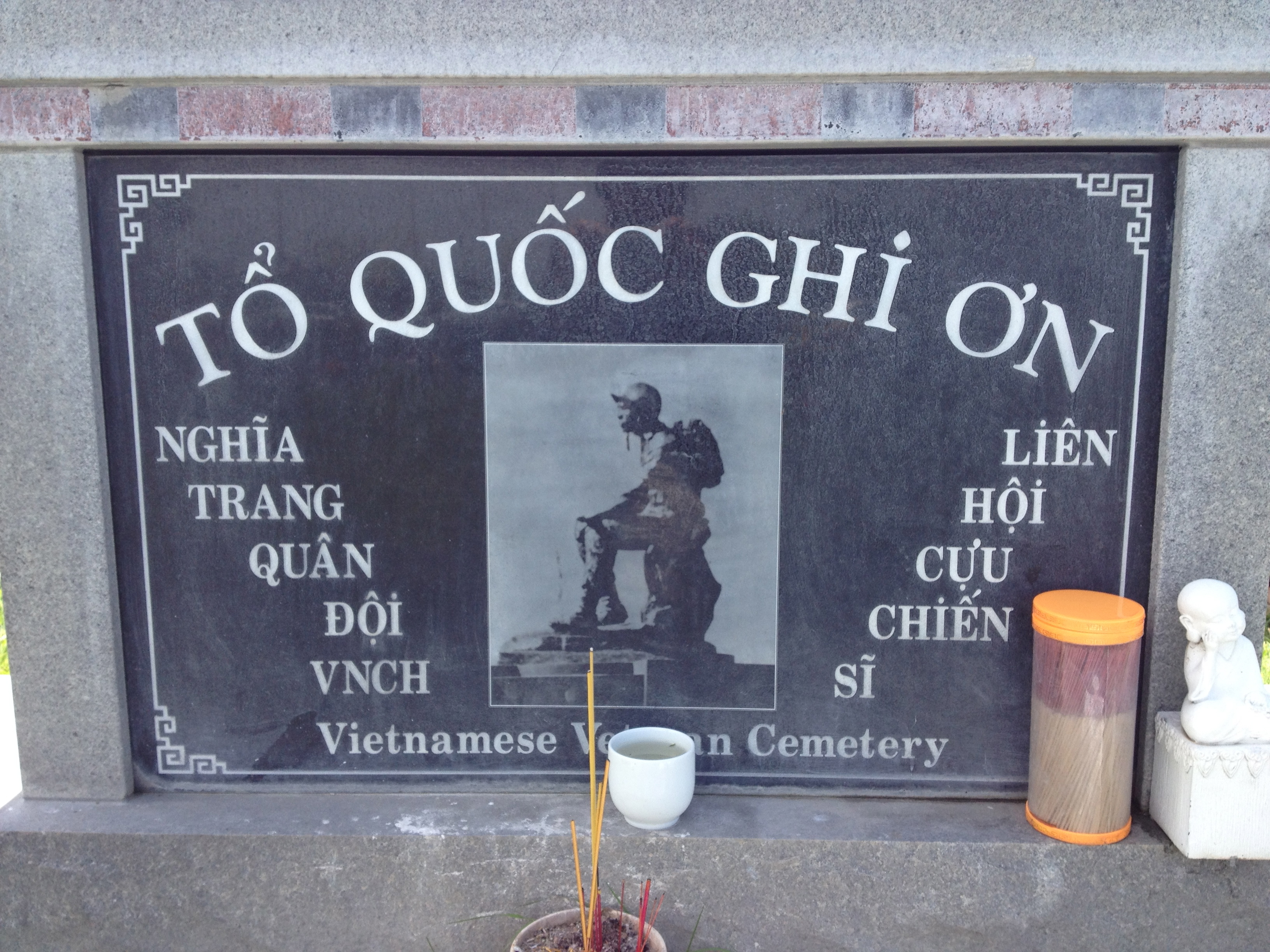
Stone plaque with photo of the Thương tiếc ("Mourning Soldier") statue, originally, installed at the Republic of Vietnam National Military Cemetery. The original statue was demolished after April 1975.

The war has featured extensively in television, film, video games, music and literature. In Vietnam, the Girl from Hanoi (1974) was a film set during Operation Linebacker II, depicting wartime life. Another notable work was the diary of Đặng Thùy Trâm, a doctor killed by US forces at age 27. It was published in English as Last Night I Dreamed of Peace and adapted into the film Don't Burn. The novel The Sorrow of War by North Vietnamese veteran Bảo Ninh was controversial in Vietnam but became an international bestseller.

The first major film on the war was John Wayne's pro-war The Green Berets (1968). Further films were released, the most noteworthy examples being Michael Cimino's The Deer Hunter (1978), Francis Ford Coppola's Apocalypse Now (1979), Oliver Stone's Platoon (1986), and Stanley Kubrick's Full Metal Jacket (1987). Other films include Good Morning, Vietnam (1987), Casualties of War (1989), and Born on the Fourth of July (1989).

The war influenced a generation of musicians and songwriters, pro/anti-war and pro/anti-communist. The Vietnam War Song Project has identified 5,000+ songs referencing the conflict. Country Joe and the Fish recorded "I-Feel-Like-I'm-Fixin'-to-Die Rag" in 1965, and it became one of the most influential protest anthems.

==== Myths ====
Myths play a role in the historiography of the war. Discussion of myth has focused on US experiences, but changing myths have played a role in Vietnamese and Australian historiography. Scholarship has focused on "myth-busting", attacking orthodox and revisionist schools of historiography, and challenging myths about American society and soldiery in the war.

Kuzmarov in The Myth of the Addicted Army: Vietnam and the Modern War on Drugs challenges the popular and Hollywood narrative that US soldiers were heavy drug users, in particular the notion that the Mỹ Lai massacre was caused by drug use. According to Kuzmarov, Nixon is primarily responsible for creating the drug myth. Michael Allen accuses Nixon of mythmaking, by exploiting the plight of the National League of POW/MIA Families to allow the government to appear caring, as the war was increasingly considered lost. Allen's analysis ties the position of potential missing Americans, or prisoners into post-war politics and presidential elections, including the Swift boat controversy.

== See also ==
- Korean War (1950–1953)
- List of conflicts in Asia
- Third Indochina War (1978–1991)
- Soviet–Afghan War (1979–1989)
