= 1969 New Zealand gallantry awards =

Awards list for New Zealand

The 1969 New Zealand gallantry awards were announced via three Special Honours Lists dated 14 February, 18 March and 24 September 1969, and recognised 11 New Zealand military personnel for gallantry and distinguished service during operations in Vietnam.

== Order of the British Empire ==
=== Member (MBE) ===
Military division, additional

- Major (now Lieutenant-Colonel) Geoffrey Andrew Hitchings – Royal Regiment of New Zealand Artillery (Regular Force).

== Military Cross (MC) ==
- Lieutenant Brian Charles Barley – Royal New Zealand Infantry Regiment.
- Major Marshall John Hall – Royal New Zealand Infantry Regiment.
- Captain Harry Russell – Royal New Zealand Armoured Corps; now of Papakura,

== Distinguished Conduct Medal (DCM) ==
- Private (temporary Lance Corporal) David Parata Ransfield – Royal New Zealand Infantry Regiment.
- Sergeant John Grant Sandford – Royal New Zealand Infantry Regiment.

== Mentioned in despatches ==
- Private Gordon John Dalziel – Royal New Zealand Infantry Regiment.
- Staff Sergeant James Ross Hardie – Royal New Zealand Infantry Regiment.
- Sapper Wiki Kahika – Corps of Royal New Zealand Engineers.
- Captain Barrie Davidson Sinclair – Royal New Zealand Infantry Regiment.
- Captain Martin James Steeds – Royal New Zealand Armoured Corps.
