= 1966 New Zealand gallantry awards =

Awards list for New Zealand

The 1966 New Zealand gallantry awards were announced via a special honours list dated 5 September 1966, and recognised four New Zealand military personnel for gallant and distinguished services in operations in South Vietnam.

== Order of the British Empire ==
=== Member (MBE) ===
Military division

- Warrant Officer Second Class Malcolm Charles Nabbs – Royal New Zealand Artillery (Regular Force); of Waiouru.

== British Empire Medal (BEM) ==
Military division

- Staff Sergeant Graeme Buxton Black – Royal New Zealand Artillery (Regular Force); of Hamilton.

== Military Cross (MC) ==
- Captain Bruce Augustine Murphy – Royal New Zealand Artillery (Regular Force); of Papakura.

== Mentioned in despatches ==
- Lance Bombardier Douglas Thomas Arthur Morrow – Royal New Zealand Artillery (Regular Force); of Taihape.
