= Free World Military Assistance Forces =

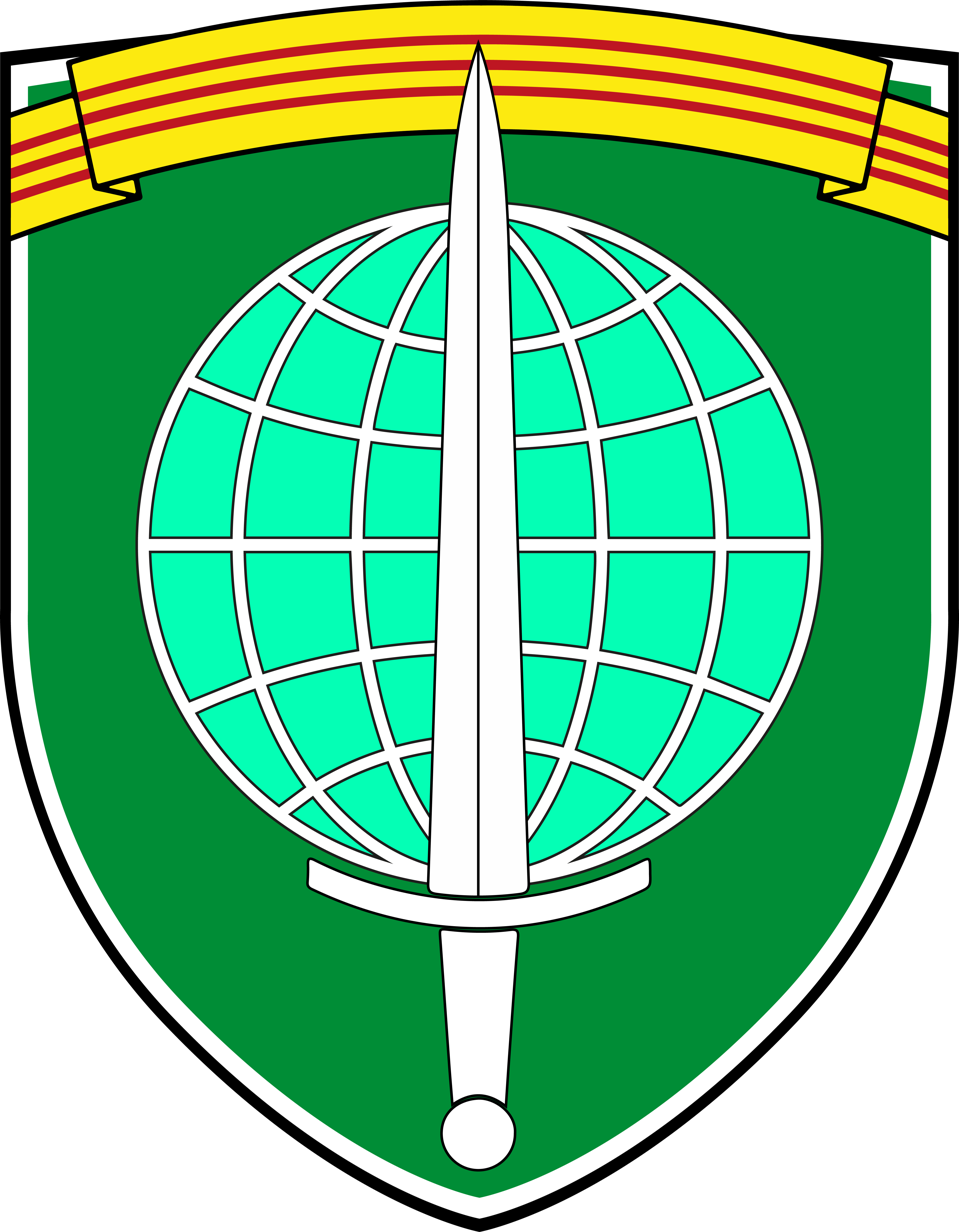
- FWMAF
- Active: 1965–1973
- Country: United States; South Vietnam; Australia; New Zealand; South Korea; Thailand; Taiwan; Spain; Philippines
- Engagements: Vietnam War

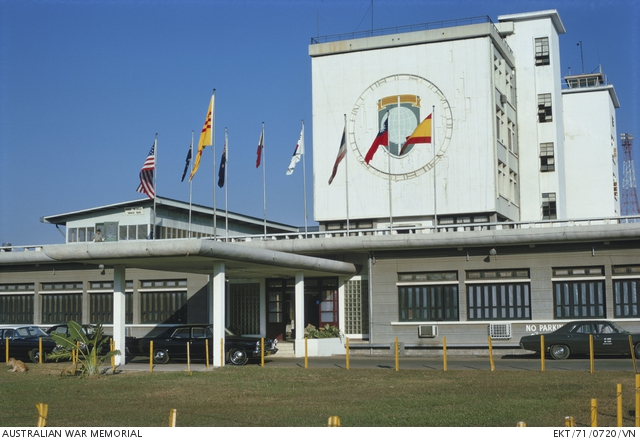
Free World Military Assistance Forces headquarters in Saigon, South Vietnam, 1971

The Free World Military Assistance Forces (FWMAF), also known as the Free World Military Forces (FWMF) and the Free World Forces (FWF), was the collective group of several allied nations who sent combat troops to fight or other support to aid in the war effort in the Vietnam War under the FWMAF banner, assisting South Vietnam against North Vietnam and the Viet Cong (VC). Together with South Vietnamese, the FWMAF were often referred to as the "Allies". It did not include anti-communist armies in Laos and Cambodia that also supported South Vietnam and fought native communists supported by North Vietnam.

== History ==
=== Background ===
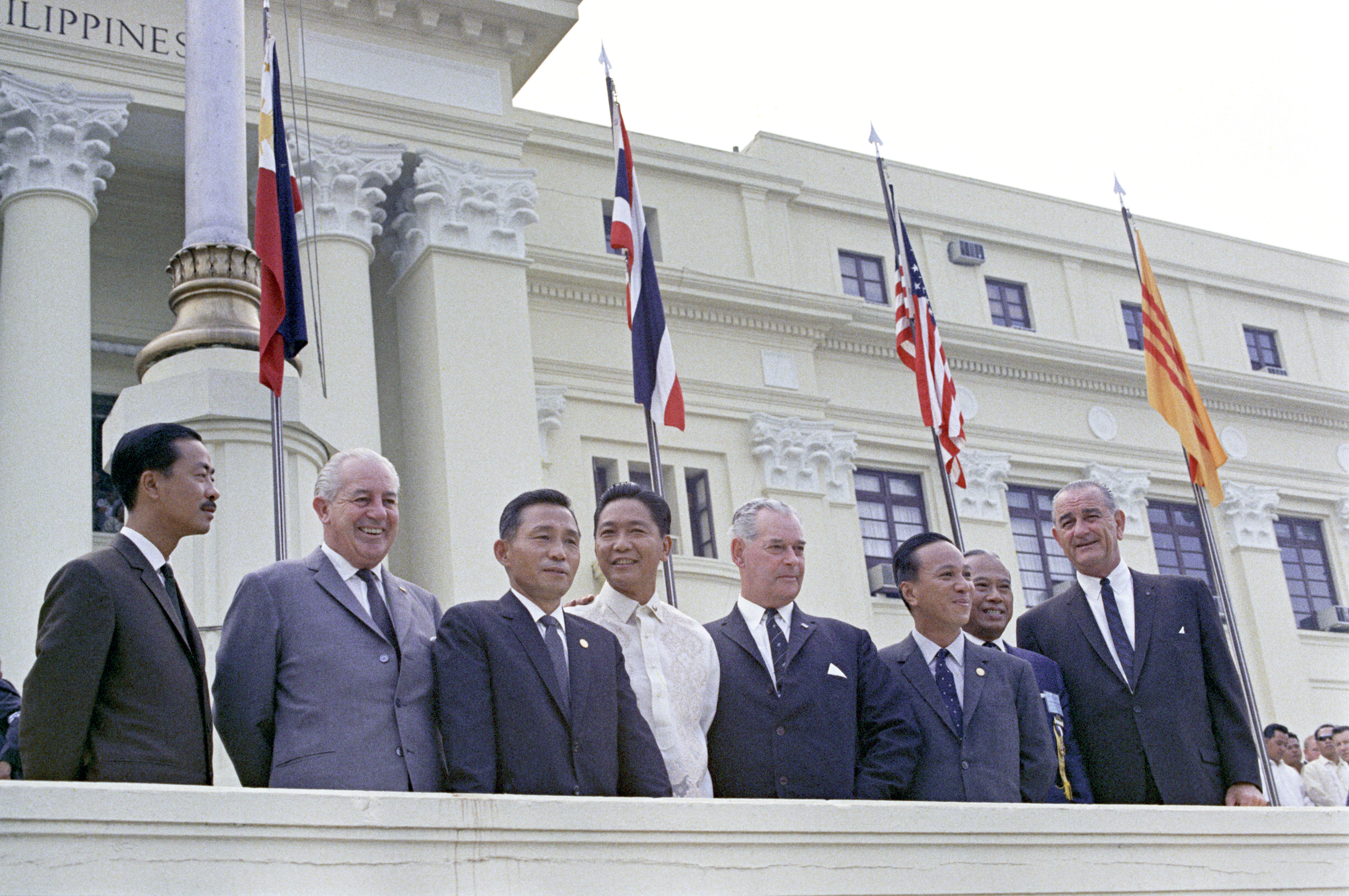
U.S., South Vietnamese and Free World Military Assistance Forces leaders at the October 1966 Manila Summit Conference.

On 23 April 1964, United States President Lyndon B. Johnson called for "more flags" to support South Vietnam. Also in April the Ministerial Council of the Southeast Asia Treaty Organization (SEATO) issued a communique declaring the defeat of the VC essential to Southeast Asia's security and underscoring the necessity for SEATO nations to fulfill their treaty obligations.

In a meeting at the White House on 1 December 1964, it was resolved that aid be sought from "key allies". Thailand was to be asked to support the U.S. and intensify its own counterinsurgency efforts in Thailand. Prime Minister Harold Wilson of the United Kingdom was to be briefed and his support sought. William P. Bundy of the U.S. State Department was to ask Australia and New Zealand for additional help as well as consideration of sending small combat units. The Philippines were to be asked for a commitment of approximately 1,800 men. Assistance from South Korea was not discussed at the meeting. Aside from tentative probes of the attitudes of the governments of Australia and New Zealand, no effort was being made to secure combat troops for South Vietnam, but rather economic assistance, military advisers, civil affairs personnel and humanitarian aid was sought.

The usual procedure was to have the American embassies in Europe, Asia, and Latin America discuss the subject of aid for South Vietnam with the host countries. Military Assistance Command, Vietnam (MACV) and the U.S. Operations Mission prepared a list of the kind of aid desired. When a country agreed to provide some assistance the U.S. government then informed the South Vietnamese government, which in turn made a formal request for aid from the country.

In January 1965, as the U.S. became more actively engaged in the war, the search for more flags was intensified and the U.S. began to seek combat units.

On 6 April 1965, the decision to seek Free World combat troops was confirmed and embodied in National Security Action Memorandum 328. The State Department was to explore with the South Korean, Australian and New Zealand governments the possibility of rapidly deploying combat elements of their armed forces in conjunction with additional U.S. deployments. Both Australia and South Korea had already on 3 April 1965 indicated informally their willingness to send combat troops.

=== Initial deployments ===
In June 1965, the first FWMAF troops arrived in South Vietnam with the 1st Battalion, Royal Australian Regiment deployed to Bien Hoa Air Base under the operational control of the U.S. 173rd Airborne Brigade. They would be joined in July by the 161st Field Battery, Royal New Zealand Artillery.

In September 1965, the South Korean Capital Division and 2nd Marine Brigade were landed at Qui Nhon.

On 17 February 1966, the Royal Thai Military Assistance Group, Vietnam, was activated, with the Royal Thai Air Force contingent becoming a subordinate element of that group. In March a military working arrangement was signed between MACV and the Royal Thai Military Assistance Group, Vietnam.

On 28 July 1966, the first elements of the Philippine Civic Action Group arrived in South Vietnam and were soon deployed to Tây Ninh Combat Base.

=== Command arrangements ===
From June to October 1964, Free World activities had been handled by a small staff section within the MACV J-5, Plans and Policy Directorate. As the scope of the Free World contributions, military and technical, grew, the need for a separate staff section just for Free World affairs became apparent. As a first step COMUSMACV General William Westmoreland in December 1964 had established the International Military Assistance Office under the staff supervision of the MACV assistant chief of staff, J-5. In May 1965 after the decision to seek Free World combat forces had been taken further plans were made to effect smooth-functioning command relationships.

In October 1965, the International Military Assistance Office was renamed the Free World Military Assistance Office, this agency acquired its own building in downtown Saigon known as the Free World Building (10.772°N 106.674°E), which it shared with representatives of the troop-contributing countries. Codifying earlier ad hoc arrangements, the Free World Military Assistance Office outlined command relationships between MACV, the FWMAF and the South Vietnamese. Each force was under the command of a general officer of its own nationality who maintained his headquarters in Saigon. The national commander, cooperating with representatives of MACV and the South Vietnamese Joint General Staff (JGS) (in practice Generals Westmoreland and Cao Văn Viên for major contingents, such as the South Koreans), formed a policy council that implemented the terms of the military agreements between the U.S., South Vietnam and the contributing country. The council’s most important task was the establishment of an exact command relationship between the allied force, MACV and the JGS. In practice, this meant that the allies dealt directly with MACV, since the FWMAF countries ruled out any subordination of their forces to those of Saigon. The Australians, New Zealanders, Thais and to a degree the Filipinos placed their troops under Westmoreland's operational control and that of his subordinate American tactical commanders. These arrangements, however, were less militarily absolute and straightforward than their formal terms might have suggested. Each country kept close watch over its contingent and negotiated with MACV the exact extent of its forces’ participation in combat. Concerned about the domestic political effects of heavy casualties, for example, the Australian and New Zealand governments were reluctant to engage their soldiers in risky offensive operations and also wanted to keep them out of internationally sensitive areas such as the Cambodian border region. After lengthy negotiations with Lieutenant General John Wilton, chief of the Australian Army General Staff and other Australian officials, as well as with the South Vietnamese, Westmoreland early in 1966 assigned the Australian–New Zealand task force its own area of operations in Phước Tuy Province east of Saigon. There, in a province well away from Cambodia that large enemy main-force units rarely entered, the task force could protect an important highway and fight VC guerrillas.

The South Koreans, whose troops eventually took over defense of most of the populated coastal region of II Corps, rejected any semblance of formal American operational control. Viewing their presence in South Vietnam as a bargaining lever in their relations with the U.S. and as an occasion to assert themselves as an Asian anti-Communist power in their own right, the South Koreans from the outset insisted that their expeditionary force be treated as independent of, and coequal with, the U.S. and South Vietnamese armies. Since the U.S. desired to have South Korean soldiers in South Vietnam much more than the South Koreans needed to be there, the South Korean government was able to obtain generally what it wanted in terms of command relationships.

On 6 September 1965, after lengthy conferences between the South Korean commander, General Chae Myung-shin, Westmoreland and Cao Văn Viên, a new military working arrangement was signed providing for MACV logistical and intelligence support for the South Korean force, but Chae, on grounds of national sovereignty and prestige, refused to sign any document formally placing his troops under Westmoreland’s operational control. On the question of command, the document simply declared that the South Korean units would “execute necessary operational missions in support of the National Pacification Program” under their own commander. Privately, Chae and other South Korean officials assured Westmoreland that their forces would act as though they were under his orders and those of the I Field Force, Vietnam commander, Major General Stanley R. Larsen, as long as nothing was put in writing and the orders were couched as requests. Westmoreland accepted this gentlemen’s agreement as "probably more durable and certainly more politically palatable than a formal arrangement that would create unnecessary controversy... be politically awkward to the Koreans, and in the final analysis not be binding."

=== Peak strength of the FWMAF ===
At peak strength, the FWMAF amounted to more than 68,000 men and included 31 maneuver battalions. These comprised:

- South Korea – ~50,000
- Thailand – 11,568
- Philippines – 2,064 (non-combat, medical assistance only).
- Australia – 7,626
- New Zealand – 552
- Spain – 30 (non-combat, medical and logistics assistance only).

=== Vietnamization and withdrawal ===
With the implementation of Vietnamization and withdrawal of U.S. forces starting in mid-1969 the countries contributing to the FWMAF also looked to reduce their forces.

The Philippines Civic Action Group began to leave South Vietnam on 1 December 1969 and all had left by 15 February 1970.

Half of the Royal Thai Army Expeditionary Division was withdrawn in July 1971 and the headquarters, Royal Thai Forces, Vietnam was reduced to 204 men. In February 1972, the other half of the division was withdrawn. Then in April 1972, the headquarters was withdrawn.

On 20 August 1970, the Australian government announced that an infantry battalion would not be replaced when it rotated out of South Vietnam in November 1970. On 18 August 1971, Australia and New Zealand decided to withdraw their troops from South Vietnam with the announcement that 1st Australian Task Force would cease operations in October, commencing a phased withdrawal. The last infantry battalion departed on 9 December 1971, while various support units stayed until 12 March 1972.

The last FWMAF forces, from South Korea, were withdrawn on 23 March 1973 with the implementation of the Paris Peace Accords.

== Assessment ==
The FWMAF made a significant, if limited, contribution to the war effort. The South Koreans, for example, protected a large, heavily populated area containing several major ports and allied bases, freeing American and South Vietnamese troops for other tasks but, because of their defensivemindedness, Larsen considered them "on balance... about one half as effective in combat as our best US units.”. The Australians and New Zealanders, though few in numbers, were competent professional soldiers experienced in antiguerrilla operations. Philippine and Thai troops, much less effective, nevertheless enhanced security in the areas where they were stationed. However, the FWMAF, and most notably the South Koreans, required disproportionate amounts of U.S. logistical and combat support and of MACV command and staff attention.
