= Many Flags =

Cold War-era military and propaganda initiative

The Many Flags campaign was an initiative by United States President Lyndon Johnson to get U.S. allies in Asia and the Pacific to participate in the Vietnam War in support of South Vietnam. While it served a military purpose, the program was also a propaganda effort by Johnson to enlist Free World forces in the Cold War against communism. The U.S. supported the Allied forces through direct monetary aid, military contracts, logistic aid, and various forms of economic compensation.

Officially South Vietnam was aided by 7 countries that sent personnel, money and material to support the government and the South Vietnamese army. These states were Australia, New Zealand, Philippines, South Korea, Taiwan, Thailand, and the United States.

== Allied countries ==
Nation	Contribution	Casualties
United States	9,087,000	~58,000
South Korea	320,000	5,099 killed and 10,962 injured
Thailand	40,000	351 killed and 1,358 wounded
Australia	60,000	521
New Zealand	3,890	37 killed 187 injured

Under this program, 5 states contributed troops: Thailand, Australia, New Zealand, South Korea, and the Philippines.

ANZUS Pact allies Australia and New Zealand contributed several thousand men (61,000 and 3,890, respectively), but they agreed only to a limited support role. Australia sent more than 61,000 soldiers who fought in the war between 1962 and 1972, although that commitment never exceeded 8,000 troops at one time. In addition to sending infantry, airborne, special forces, medical and armoured units, Australia's task force also included squadrons of helicopters, transport planes and even Canberra bombers. The Royal Australian Navy contributed a destroyer to the effort as well. More than 500 Australian personnel were killed during 10 years of operations and 3,000 were wounded. For its part, New Zealand sent more than 3,800 troops between 1964 and 1972 as part of the Allied war effort. In addition to providing artillery batteries, combat engineers and medical personnel, New Zealand sent elements of the country's elite Special Air Service. Pilots also served as part of the larger Australian contingent. In all, 37 troops were killed during the eight-year mission and 187 were wounded. The war proved highly unpopular at home and eventually led to the downfall of the National Party government of Jack Marshall.

South Korean President Park Chung Hee agreed to contribute troops in return for U.S. support in the Korean War as well as U.S. aid money for his modernization program. South Korea was by far the largest contributor to the Many Flags commitment and its contingent peaked at about 50,000 at one time. Over several years, some 300,000 Korean infantry and marines served in South Vietnam. More than 5,000 of the country's soldiers were killed in 9 years of fighting and 10,000 were wounded.

In 1965 Thailand sent a small army contingent to South Vietnam, known as the Queen's Cobra Battalion. It also pledged its national police force's air assets to monitor several segments of the Ho Chi Minh trail that passed through neighbouring Laos. Thailand contributed more than 12,000 troops, of which 351 were killed in action in Vietnam.

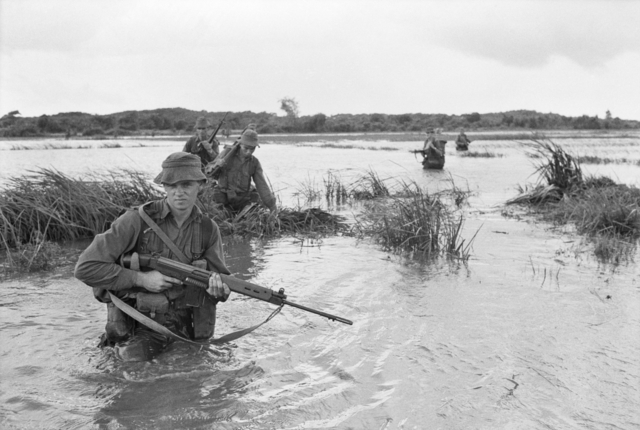
Members of the 2nd Battalion, Royal Australian Regiment during a patrol in September 1967

Beginning in 1966, Philippines deployed upwards of 10,000 troops to help support the Saigon government, but kept its contribution limited to medical and logistical operations. Filipino casualties were minimal, yet the decision by the administration of Ferdinand Marcos to deploy troops to Indochina was still controversial domestically.

One of the earliest foreign contributors to the Saigon government was the anti-communist Republic of China. In fact, Taiwan provided transport aircraft and secretly offered several hundred of its special forces soldiers to the cause beginning in 1961. Over the next 11 years, three aircraft were lost to enemy ground fire and a number of Taiwanese commandos were captured while on missions in North Vietnam. In all, 25 Taiwanese died in action in Vietnam.

In addition, a number of other nations sent along small contingents of medical, transportation, construction and other experts as well as material help to the South Vietnamese government in Saigon. These nations were: Afghanistan, Argentina, Belgium, Brazil, Canada, Costa Rica, Denmark, Ecuador, France, Greece, Guatemala, Honduras, Iran, Ireland, Italy, Japan, Laos, Liberia, Luxembourg, Malaysia, Morocco, Netherlands, Norway, Pakistan, South Africa, Spain, Switzerland, Taiwan, Tunisia, Turkey, United Kingdom, Uruguay, Venezuela and West Germany.

== See also ==
- Vietnam War § Involvement of other countries
- South Korea in the Vietnam War
- Military history of Australia during the Vietnam War
- New Zealand in the Vietnam War
- Thailand in the Vietnam War
- Military history of the Philippines#Vietnam War (1964–1969)
- Free World Military Assistance Forces
