= Engineer Corps Memorial Centre =

Coordinates: 40.40734°S 175.58672°E

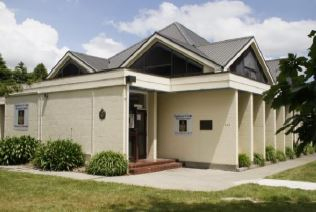
- The ECMC museum building
- Established: January 1982
- Location: Linton Military Camp, Palmerston North, New Zealand
- Type: Military museum
- Collection size: 60,000+ items/6,000 books, etc
- Curators: Joe Hollander, Howard Chamberlain
- Website: www.sappers.org.nz/index.php/ecmc

The Engineer Corps Memorial Centre (ECMC) is a museum, library and chapel complex located at Linton Military Camp, south of Palmerston North, New Zealand. The centre focuses on the preservation of history and heritage of the Corps of Royal New Zealand Engineers (RNZE).

== History ==
In January 1964, the RNZE Corps Committee commenced proposals for an Engineer Corps Memorial Centre within Linton Camp, where the RNZE was the main Corps in residence. Colonel Andrew Murray, RNZE Colonel Commandant at the time, Major George Bunce and Major H.I. (Fritz) Dowrick were involved in discussing and developing the proposal. The future site of the centre was surveyed by Majors Eddie Farnell and Charles Kibblewhite and by May 1968 Dudley Roy, RNZE veteran and architect, had preliminary plans drawn up.

The principles behind the establishment of the RNZE Corps Memorial Museum and Library are two-fold.

1. To enrich the cultural life in RNZE by collecting, sorting, displaying, fostering and promoting the military history and heritage of the Corps of RNZE.

2. To work within the New Zealand Defence Force, the Corps of RNZE, and serving and former RNZE personnel to provide a suitable venue where historical artifacts may be brought together as a research and developmental resource for all, to grow their interests and to encourage and support their understanding of the history and heritage of the Corps of RNZE.

The original concept was a complex comprising a museum, library, chapel and social room. Several options were considered for the museum including converting an old army cookhouse and mess hall from the wartime establishment facilities within Linton Camp. Until the museum was actually built, old World War 2 buildings and stores were used as temporary storage and display sites.

Funding for the construction materials used for a new building was raised by the Corps and ECMA, with labour and supervision being provided by construction trade apprentices under training and trade training instructors from the School of Military Engineering in Linton Camp. The foundation stone was laid in 1980 and the new museum and library building was completed and opened on 30 January 1982 by the Chief of General Staff, Maj. Gen. R.G. Williams and the Colonel Commandant of RNZE Lt Col. Ken Christie. Since 2011, the ECMC has been managed and run by the RNZE Charitable Trust (RNZE CT), with the RNZE collection within the museum, library chapel and additional out-buildings, being assets of the Trust.

As of 2021, the ECMC consists of all the original complex sections, except the back (modular sections added in 1986-87 - used to be the library or "Hollander Wing") rooms which have been temporarily assigned to QAMR cavalry regiment. The ECMC and RNZE Charitable Trust (RNZE CT) co-hosts (with the Palmerston North City Library (PNCL) a monthly military history presentation held in the PNCL in the Palmerston North CBD, with a wide range of New Zealand and global military topics, which are open to the general public, as well a military staff from Linton Military Camp and RNZAF Base Ohakea.

== Memorial Centre buildings ==
=== Museum ===
The museum consists of collections of over 60,000 items including badges, medals, currencies, tools and equipment, maps, memorabilia, measuring and survey equipment, presentations, references, reports, uniforms, war art, etc. The collections are displayed outlining the chronology of the Corps, defined by its unique missions and global conflicts since the early NZ Wars.

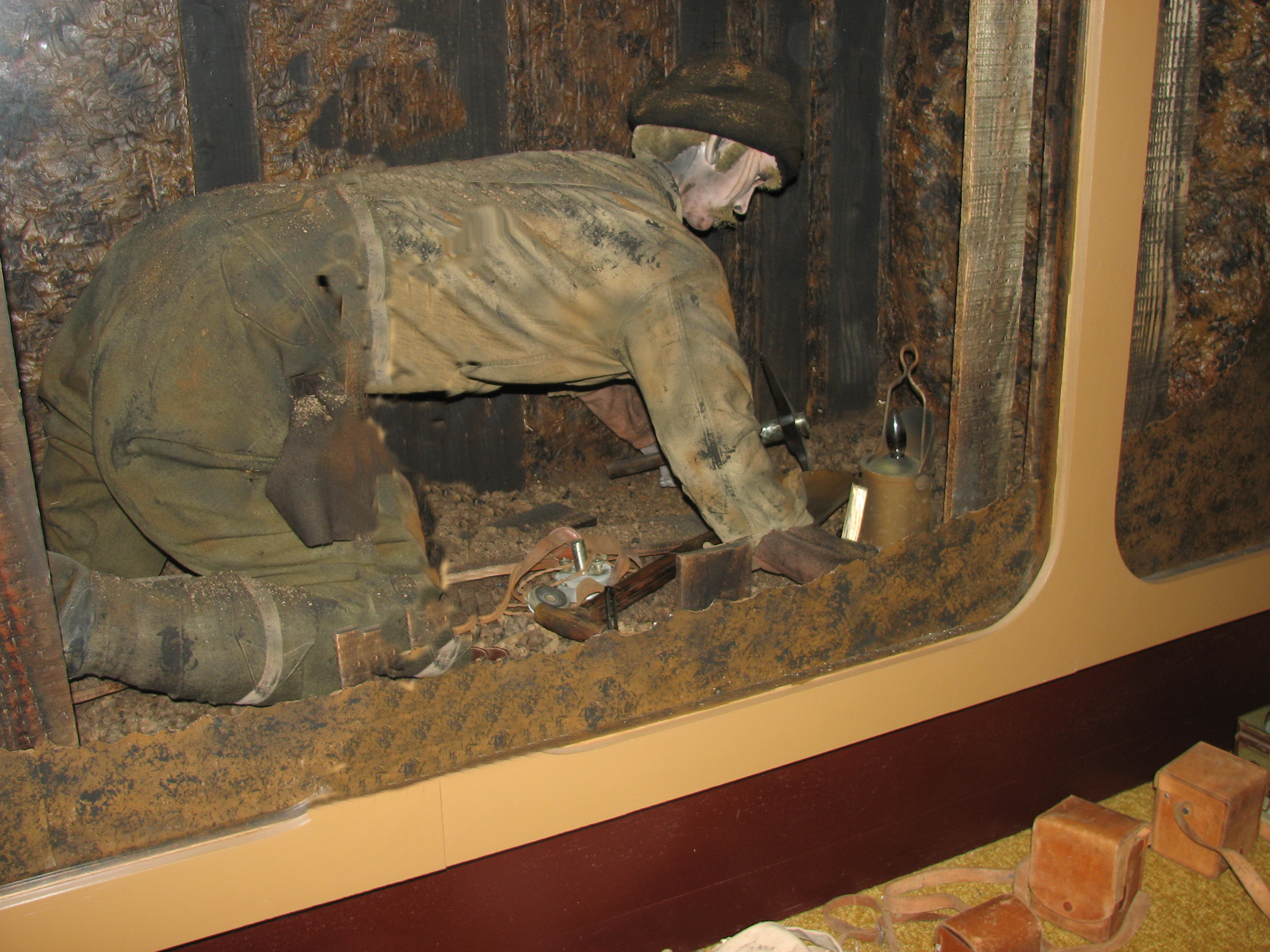
World War 1 Tunnellers Display

==== Exhibits ====
- Maori military engineering
- New Zealand Wars (1845–1872)
- Engineer Volunteers (1865–1910)
- Submarine and Mining Corps
- Tunnellers and Miners
- World War 1 (1914–1918)
- World War 2 (1939–1945)
- Korean War (1950–1957)
- Malayan Emergency (1949–1960)
- Vietnam War (1964–1972)
- Thailand (Feeder Road Project and Op Crown)
- Fiji and Rural Development Unit (RDU)
- Pacific Island Operations
- Antarctica – Scott Base Rebuild
- Army Fire Fighters/Brigades/Units
- Falklands War (1982)
- De-mining and Peacekeeping operations in Southern Africa, Bosnia, Afghanistan, Pakistan, Iraq, Cambodia, and Laos, to name a few. (1952 – present)
- Roles of the RNZE (Past and Present)

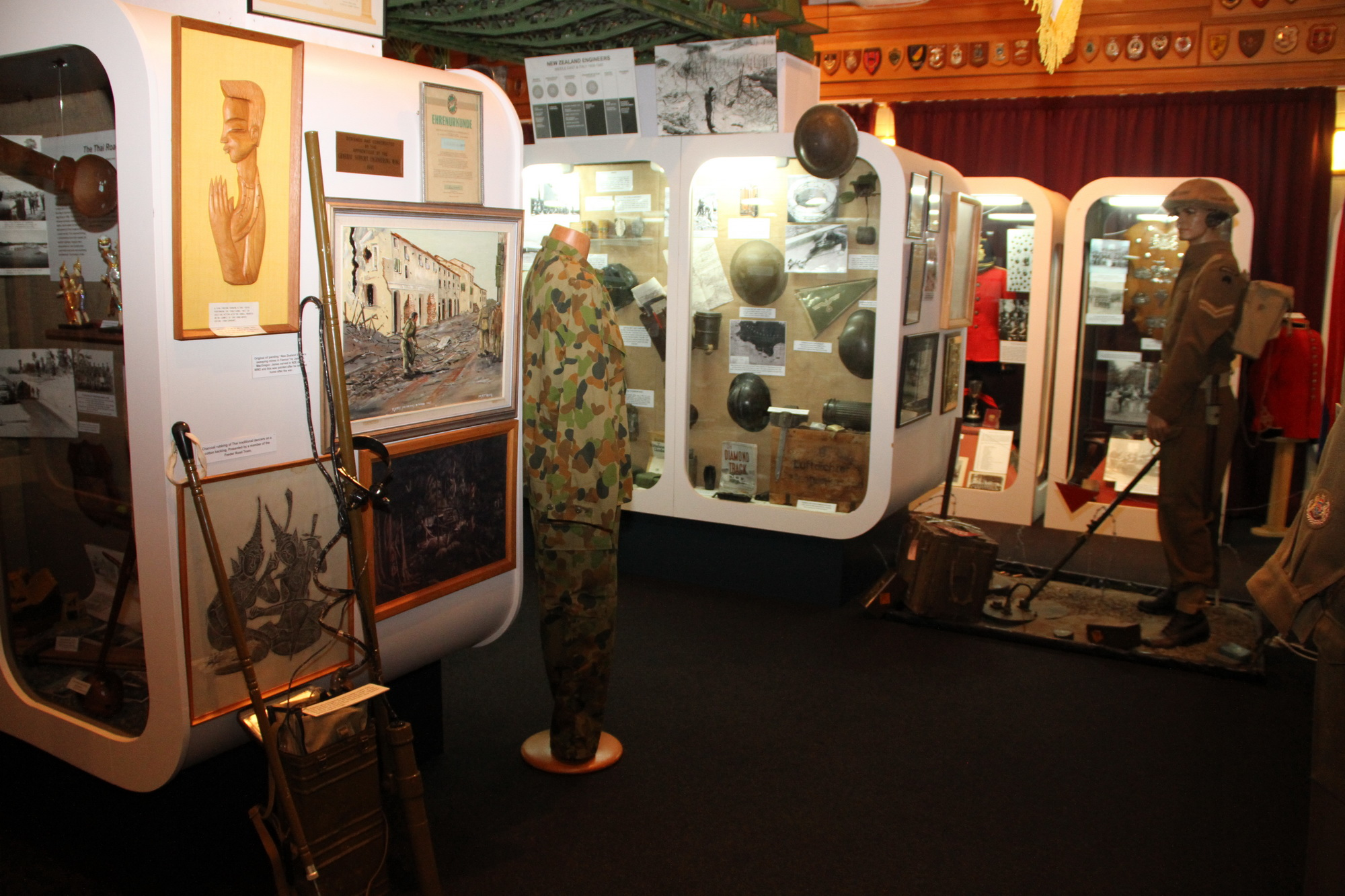
ECMC displays and exhibits

Several artifact exhibitions demonstrate the use and the range of roles that the Royal New Zealand Engineers had including, communications, calculations, surveying, horizontal and vertical construction, design, bridging, demolitions, water supply, improvised explosive devices and booby traps, mine warfare, field defences, postal and courier and so on.

==== The Kitchener Room ====
Within the museum building, houses the Kitchener Silver collection presented to the RNZE by the Kitchener family (Estate of Field Marshal Lord Kitchener), along with a range of other cups, plates, silverware, trophies, and medal collections, many dating back to the nineteenth century.

=== Library ===
The library contains over 6,000 items of reference material and acts as the "Technical Information Center" for the RNZE. The literature covers general and combat engineering, general and military history, professional papers, and records. Within the collection, there are military training manuals from Australia, New Zealand, the United Kingdom and the United States of America. There are also books covering topics of engineering and design, as well as fundamental sciences and other subjects, all encompassing the role of the engineer in peacetime and in times of conflict, providing humanitarian assistance and disaster relief (HADR) and professional engineering support. The library, having a focus on the RNZE, contains past deployment reports and project documents, as well as unit history sheet records. In addition to literature, photo albums and pictorial records visually cover the extensive history of the engineering corps.

=== Chapel ===
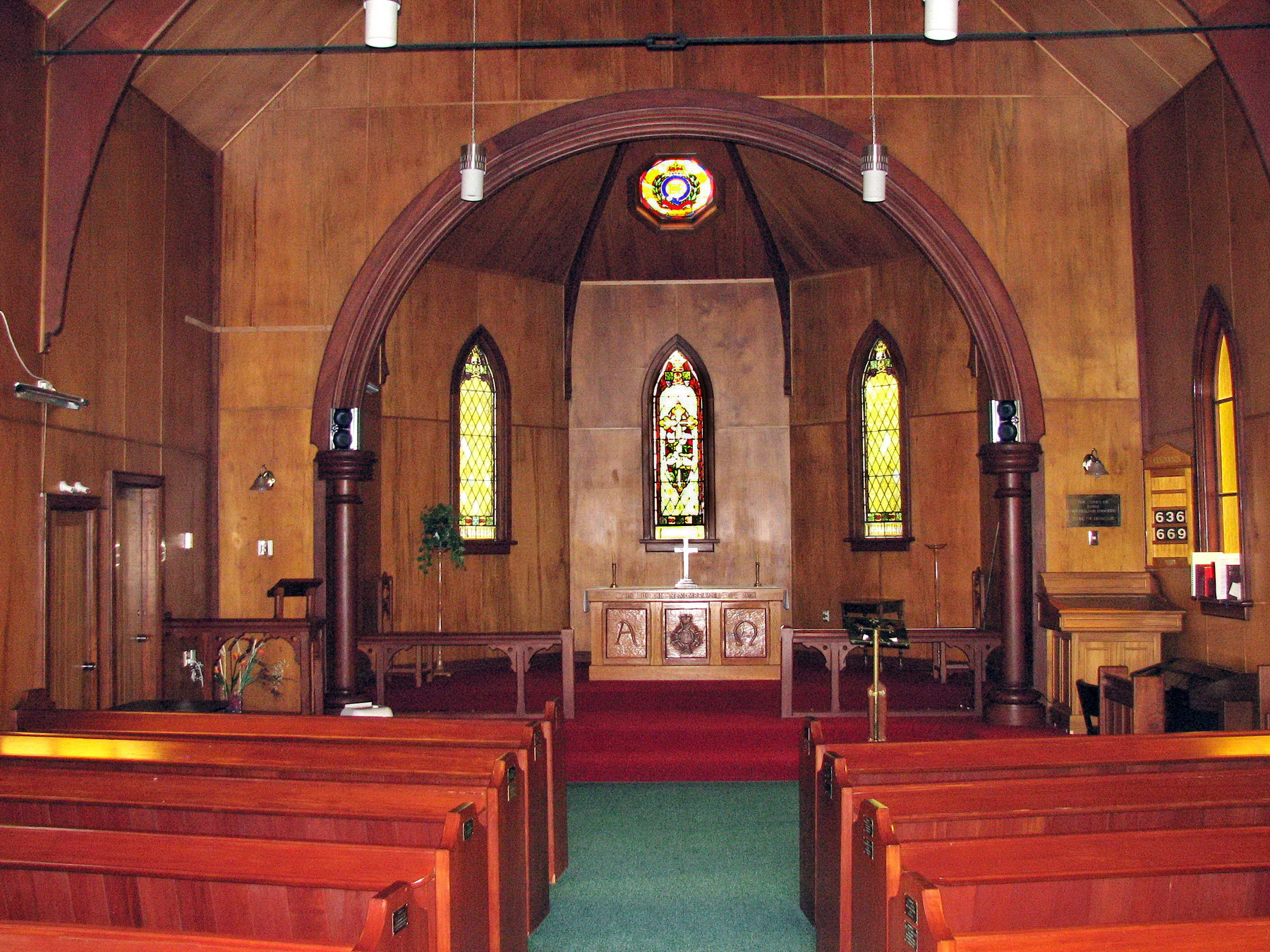
RNZE Chapel interior

The chapel, named "The Corps of Royal New Zealand Engineers Memorial and Garrison Chapel of St Martin’s" is a fully functioning (non-denominational) church, managed by the local chaplaincy in conjunction with the RTNZE CT/ECMC and houses the NZE/RNZE Rolls of Honor, the Royal Engineers (UK) stained glass window badge, a Royal Australian Engineer presentation prayer desk, the NZ Railway Engineers commemorative window, a number of other related Rolls of Honor and memorial plaques to deceased RNZE personnel mounted on the ends of the pews. Plus the original organ (circa 1897) which has returned to the chapel and was rededicated in 2020. The Rolls of Honour from the First and Second World Wars for the Linton community have also been installed in the chapel and were rededicated in mid-2020.

==== History ====
In April 1972, NZ Army Headquarters in Wellington advised the RNZE Corps Memorial Committee that a church at Makotuku (in central Hawkes Bay) and built in 1899, had been offered to Linton Camp as a Garrison Church. It was suggested that the Engineer Corps Memorial Association (ECMA - the precursor to the RNZE CT) might be interested in assisting with the removal and relocation/re-erection of the church in Linton Camp. It was then envisioned that the church would become the place of enshrinement of the Rolls of Honour of the Corps of RNZE and would also form part of the Engineer Corps Memorial Centre or ECMC.

In late November 1972 the foundations for the church were built at Linton by the 2 Field Squadron. The church was dismantled at Makotuku and transported in parts to Linton Camp, where it was rebuilt, led by Sgt Murray Holt as task foreman. By July 1974 the chapel was rebuilt at Linton Camp. On 20 July 1974 a parade of the Sapper units at the camp was held with music provided by the Palmerston North Salvation Army brass band Salvation Army Band. A special parade and service was held in 1989, to commemorate the centenary of the church, attended by members of the Makotuku community and the Corps of RNZE and other dignitaries and guests. Another special service is being planned for the 125th anniversary of the church in 2024.

== See also ==
- Military history of New Zealand
- National Army Museum (New Zealand)
- Auckland War Memorial Museum
- Torpedo Bay Navy Museum
- Air Force Museum of New Zealand
