= 1972 New Zealand gallantry awards =

Awards list for New Zealand

The 1972 New Zealand gallantry awards were announced via two Special Honours Lists dated 7 March and 27 July 1972, and recognised five New Zealand military personnel for gallant and distinguished service during operations in Vietnam.

== Distinguished Flying Cross (DFC) ==
- Squadron Leader Robin John Klitscher BSc – Royal New Zealand Air Force.
- Lieutenant Edwin Grant Steel – Royal New Zealand Infantry Regiment.

== Military Medal (MM) ==
- Lance Corporal John Leonard Adams – Royal New Zealand Infantry Regiment.

== Mention in despatches ==
- Lieutenant (temporary Captain) Robert John Sutherland Munro – Royal New Zealand Corps of Signals.
- Private Taare Parekura – Royal New Zealand Infantry Regiment.
