= 1971 New Zealand gallantry awards =

Awards list for New Zealand

The 1971 New Zealand gallantry awards were announced via four Special Honours Lists dated 7 May, 27 May, 27 September and 19 October 1971, and recognised 12 New Zealand military personnel for gallantry during operations in Vietnam.

== Order of the British Empire ==
=== Member (MBE) ===
Military division, for gallantry

- Warrant Officer First Class Richard Rex Hudson – Royal Regiment of New Zealand Artillery.

== Distinguished Flying Cross (DFC) ==
- Flight Lieutenant Douglas Ian Paterson – Royal New Zealand Air Force; of Woodville.

== Military Medal (MM) ==
- Corporal Roland Joseph Horopapera – Royal New Zealand Infantry Regiment.
- Private Robert Wayne Day – Royal New Zealand Infantry Regiment.

== Mention in despatches ==
- Captain William Anthony Blair – Royal New Zealand Infantry Regiment.
- Sergeant Graeme Cecil Faulkner – Royal New Zealand Infantry Regiment.
- Lieutenant Alastair Ronald Forrest MacKenzie – Royal New Zealand Infantry Regiment.
- Squadron Leader John Lambert Alexander Pendreigh – Royal New Zealand Air Force; of Wanganui.
- Lance Corporal William Charles Teller – Royal New Zealand Infantry Regiment.
- Major Evan John Torrance – Royal New Zealand Infantry Regiment.
- Flight Lieutenant Gordon Lennox Wood – Royal New Zealand Air Force.
- Sergeant Jersey Bassett Yandall – Royal New Zealand Infantry Regiment.
