= Chi Lăng Training Center =

Chi Lăng Training Center (That Son Airfield)
- Chi Lăng, Châu Đốc Province in Vietnam

Site information
- Type: Training Center
- Operator: Army of the Republic of Vietnam (ARVN); United States Army (U.S. Army); New Zealand Army
- Condition: Abandoned

Location
- Shown within Vietnam
- Coordinates: 10.527°N 105.024°E

Site history
- Built: 1966
- In use: 1966-
- Battles/wars: Vietnam War

Airfield information
- Elevation: 100 feet (30 m) AMSL
Runways
Direction	Length and surface
00/00	2,000 feet (610 m) Marston Mat

Chi Lăng Training Center (also known as That Son Special Forces Camp) was an Army of the Republic of Vietnam (ARVN) training center in Chi Lăng, Châu Đốc Province, South Vietnam during the Vietnam War.

== History ==
The center was located approximately twelve kilometres (7.5 mi) from the Cambodian border northeast of the Dop Chompa hill mass and 22 kilometres (14 mi) south-southwest of Châu Đốc.

The center was originally used by the 5th Special Forces Group Detachment A-432 as That Son Special Forces Camp. It was later taken over by the ARVN and MACV Advisory Team 61 for use as the main ARVN training center in IV Corps.

In January 1971 the 25 man 1st New Zealand Army Training Team Vietnam (1 NZATTV), which included members from different branches of service of the New Zealand Army was deployed to the center to assist the U.S. Army Training Team in training ARVN units. The team trained ARVN platoon commanders in weapons and tactics, class sizes were up to 150 men but attendance was poor and after nine courses had been run only 634 men had been trained. Many of the instructors took the view that the ARVN soldiers were not interested in fighting.

On 9 January 1972 a dispute between two ARVN battalions from different divisions over their rice rations led to a gun battle that resulted in two killed and 12 wounded.

1 NZATTV remained at Chi Lăng until being withdrawn as part of the general withdrawal of New Zealand forces from South Vietnam in December 1972.

That Son camp was used as the model for the fictional Phan Chau camp in Robin Moore's book The Green Berets.
