= Chi Lăng, An Giang =

Coordinates: 12°39′N 108°01′E

Chi Lăng
- Ward
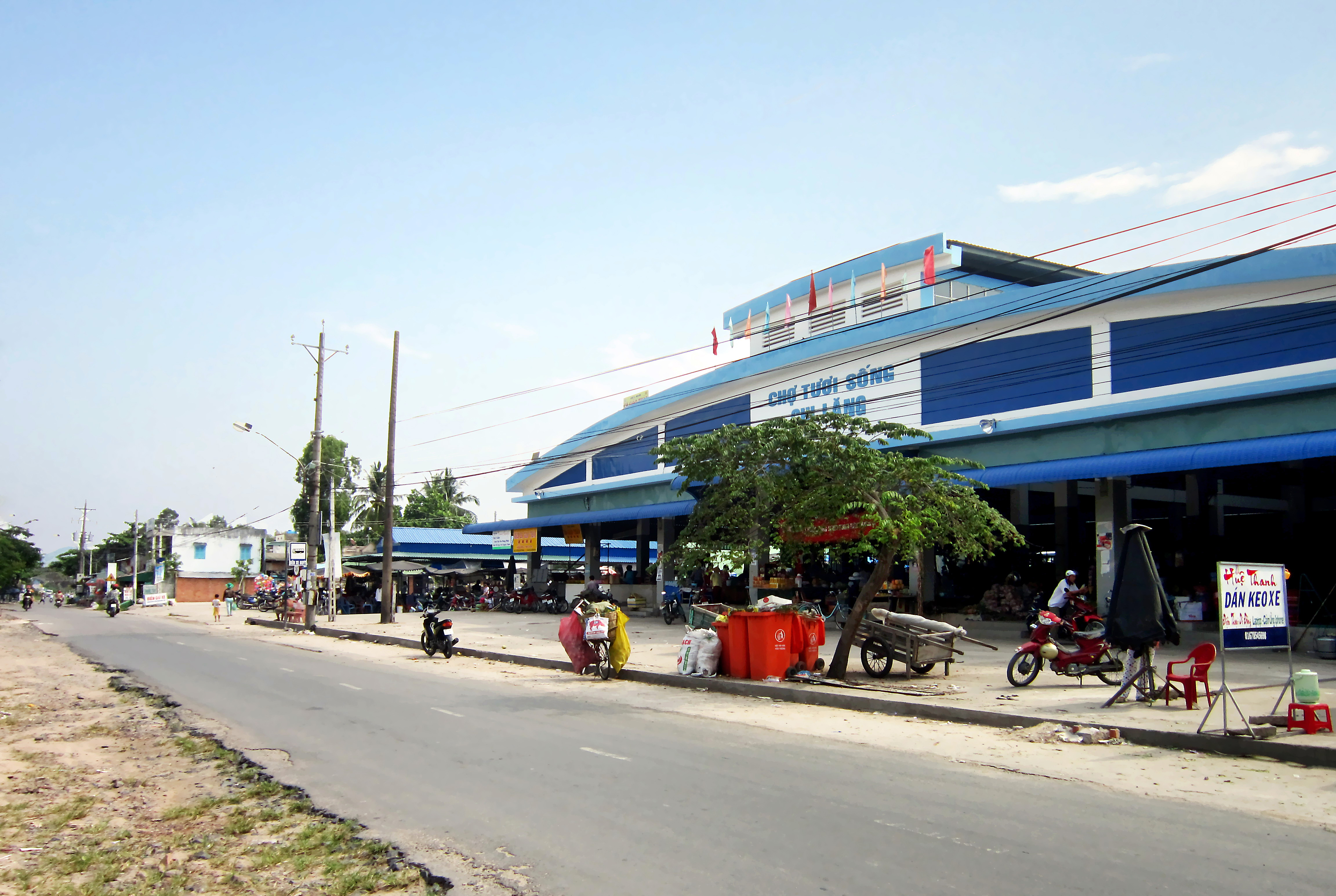
- Interactive map of Chi Lăng
- Country: Vietnam
- Province: An Giang
- Time zone: UTC+07:00 (Indochina Time)
- Climate: Aw

Chi Lăng is a ward (phường) of An Giang Province, Vietnam.
