= Corps of Royal New Zealand Engineers =

- Active: 15 October 1902 – 26 March 1908; 5 October 1911 – Present
- Country: New Zealand
- Branch: New Zealand Army
- Role: Engineers
- Size: One regiment
- Garrison/HQ: Linton Military Camp
- Nickname: Sappers
- Mottos: Ubique (Latin: "Everywhere"); Quo Fas et Gloria Ducunt (Latin: "Where Right And Glory Lead")
- March: Wings
- Anniversaries: Sappers' Day - 15 October

Commanders
- Colonel Commandant: Colonel Paul Curry

The Corps of Royal New Zealand Engineers is the administrative corps of the New Zealand Army responsible for military engineering. The role of the Engineers is to assist in maintaining friendly forces' mobility, deny freedom of movement to the enemy, and provide general engineering support. The corps has been involved in numerous conflicts over the course of its history including World War I, World War II, the Korean War, the Vietnam War and the war in Afghanistan. The corps consists of a single regiment, 2nd Engineer Regiment, primarily based at Linton Military Camp near Palmerston North.

== History ==
=== Early history and formation ===
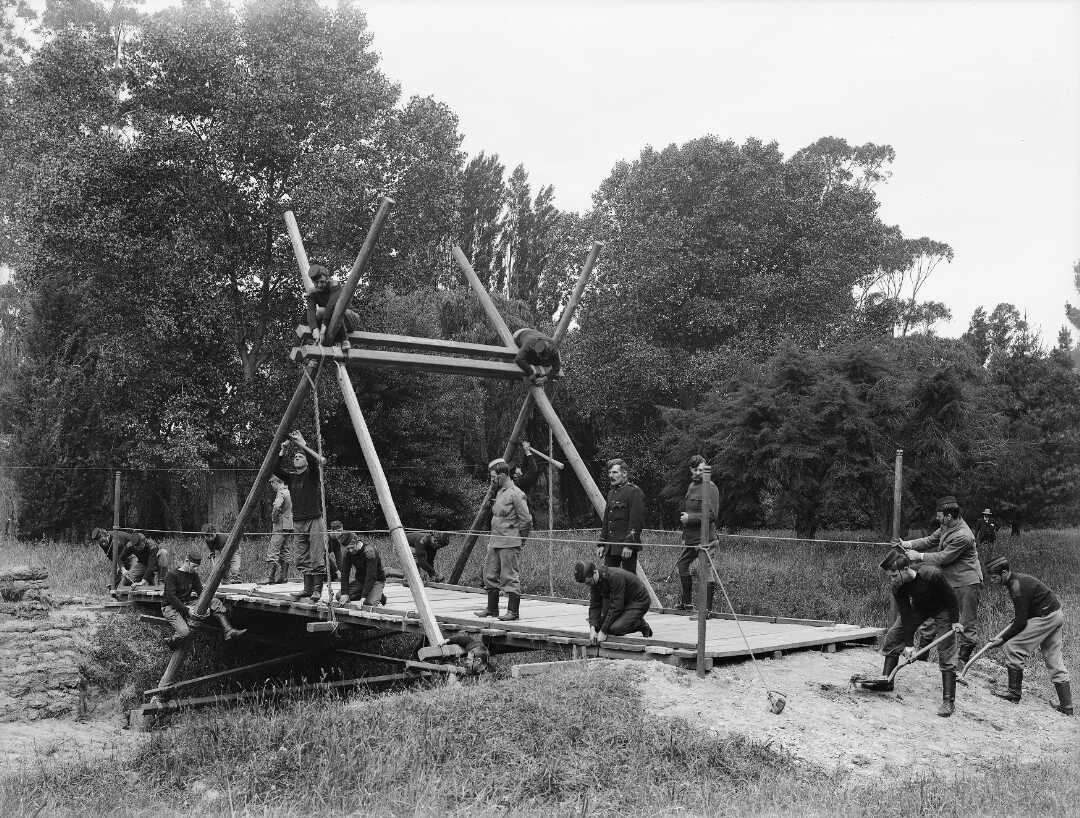
Canterbury Engineer Volunteers constructing a bridge, c. 1900

The first New Zealand European military engineering unit was an 82 man militia detachment employed as pioneers during the Flagstaff War in 1845-1846. It would be twenty years until the concept of military engineering was revisited by the colonial forces with the formation of the Volunteer Force in 1865. By the 1880s there were five volunteer engineer corps, including a torpedo corps ("torpedo" referred to undersea mines at this time). The engineers were disbanded in 1883, as adequate training could not be provided, but the Russian Scare of 1885 placed a new emphasis on costal fortifications and the engineer corps were revived.

In 1887 the military component of the armed constabulary was converted into the Permanent Militia, establishing the first New Zealand regular military force. The Permanent Militia was much smaller than the Volunteer Force and in 1888 consisted of only two companies: the Permanent Artillery and the Torpedo Corps. The Torpedo Corps became the Submarine Mining Branch in 1896 and then No. 2 Service Company in 1897. It was finally retitled as the Corps of Royal New Zealand Engineers on 7 January 1903 (backdated to 15 October 1902). This first rendition of the Royal New Zealand Engineers was short-lived and on 26 March 1908 the engineers were absorbed into the Electric light section of the Royal New Zealand Artillery.

The New Zealand Engineer Volunteers continued to exist until 5 October 1911 when they became the Corps of New Zealand Engineers as part of the conversion of the Volunteer force into the Territorial Force. The New Zealand Railway Corps and the New Zealand Post and Telegraph Corps were both formed as independent corps in October 1911, but were brought under the Corps of New Zealand Engineers umbrella in July 1913.

=== First World War ===
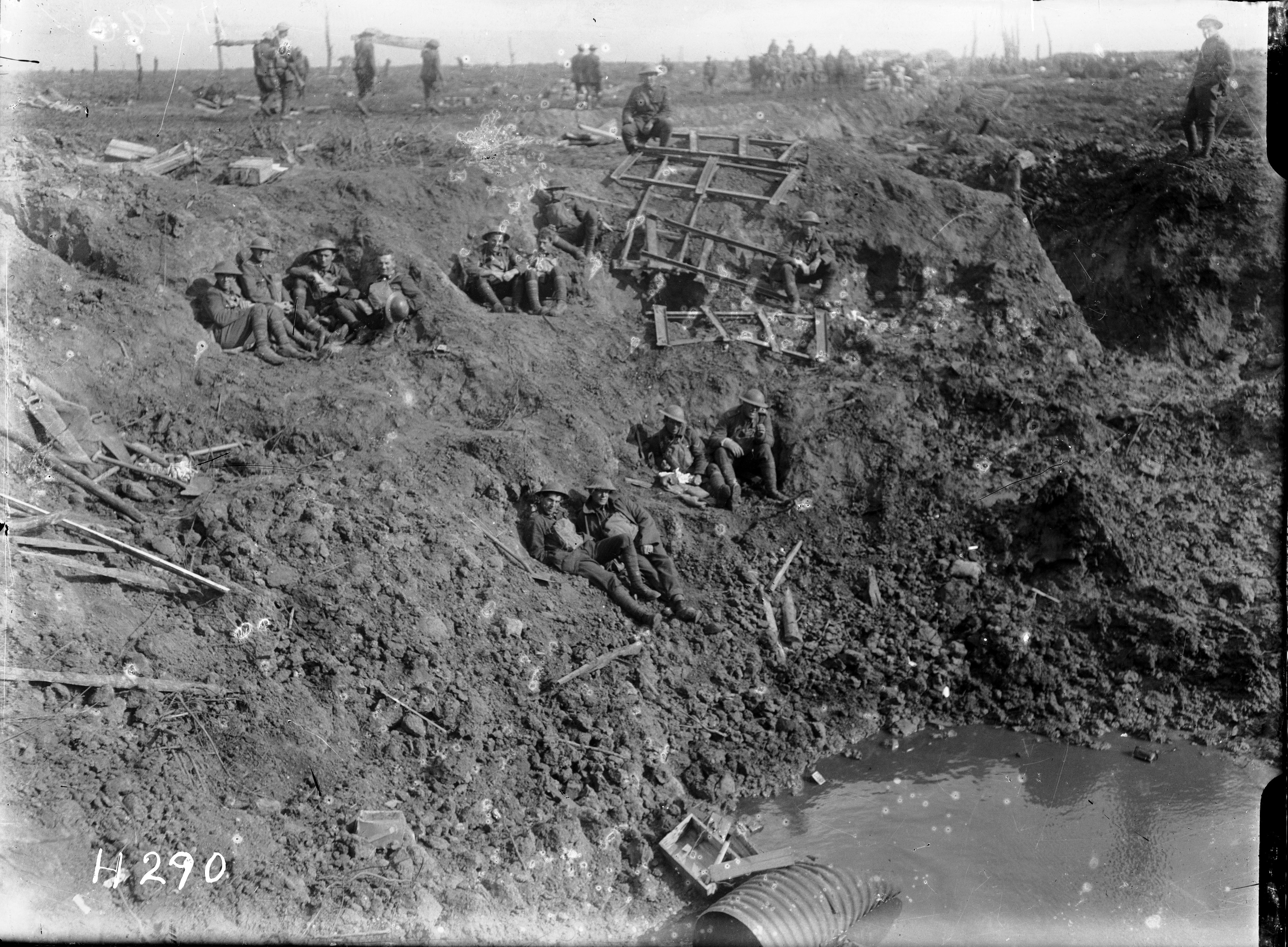
Sappers resting in a shell hole near Ypres, 1917

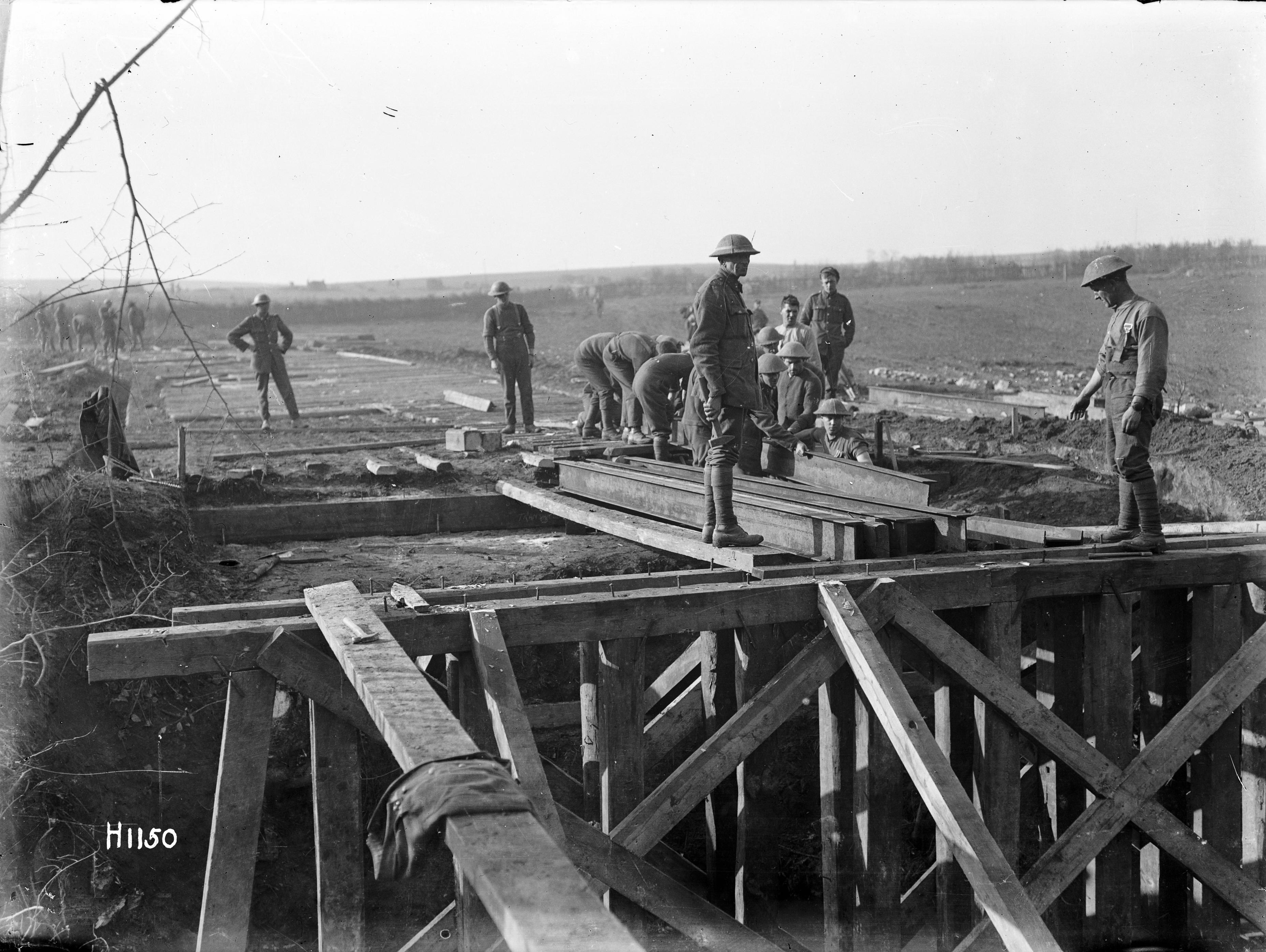
New Zealand Engineers constructing a bridge on the Western Front, 1918

The first units of the New Zealand Engineers to be sent overseas as part of the Samoa Expeditionary Force, including a company of railway engineers, two sections of field engineers, and 26 signalers.

Field engineers would be sent to Gallipoli with the New Zealand and Australian Division and then the Western front as part of the New Zealand Division. A total of four field engineer companies were raised during the war. In principle one field company was attached to each infantry brigade, but for the most part were under the control of the divisional CRE. A small number of field engineers also served in the Sinai and Palestine Campaign. These sappers served in D troop (later NZ troop) of the 1st Field Squadron of the Australian Engineers. As part of the Australian and New Zealand Mounted Division, they initially provided an engineering capability to the 2nd Light Horse Brigade, but were later assigned to the New Zealand Mounted Rifles Brigade. The field engineers role involved constructing and repairing trenches, fortifications, bridges and digging wells. The Battle of the Somme in 1916 had shown that road transport was inadequate to move supplies and ammunition to the front line and to evacuate wounded. The Engineers were therefore required to build a light railway system close to the front line and in 1917 the 5th Light Railway Operating Company was formed to specialise in these tasks.

The New Zealand Tunnelling Company was also raised in 1915 and was the first New Zealand unit deployed to the Western Front, arriving in March 1916. It was initially involved in counter-mining at Vimy ridge and later dug out tunnels at Arras. During the Hundred Days Offensive the tunnelling company was retasked with bridge building, which included the construction of a 240 foot bridge across the Canal du Nord.

Signals units, which were part of the Corps of New Zealand Engineers at this time, were attached to most units of the New Zealand Expeditionary Force. The Divisional Signal Company served with the New Zealand Infantry, while the mounted signal troop was assigned to the New Zealand Mounted Rifles Brigade. The 1st ANZAC Wireless Signal Squadron also contained a single New Zealand wireless troop and was part of India's Expeditionary Force D. The wireless troop was the only New Zealand unit to serve in the Mesopotamia Campaign.

A number of other units were raised during the First World War with similar roles to, but not part of, the New Zealand Engineers. The New Zealand (Māori) Pioneer Battalion provided a general labour force for construction and entrenching work. Attempts were made to convert the battalion into an engineering unit, but this proved to be impractical due to a shortage of adequately educated Maori officers. Three entrenching battalions were also formed in February 1918 from the recently disbanded 4th Infantry Brigade. The entrenching battalions were a reserve manpower pool for the remaining infantry brigades, but also provided a general labour force to the engineers.

During the course of the war the New Zealand Engineers suffered around 400 fatalities. (Note: Cooke claims the Corps of New Zealand Engineers suffered 410 fatal casualties (including field engineers, railway engineers, tunnellers and signallers) during the First World War, while McGibbon claims 355 deaths (including Signallers and tunnellers) and Annabell claims 309 (excluding the Divisional Signal Company).) Two members of the corps, Cyril Bassett (Divisional Signal Company) and Samuel Forsyth (attached to 2nd Battalion, Auckland Infantry Regiment) were awarded the Victoria Cross.

Following the war the Corps of New Zealand Engineers was restructured. In 1921 the New Zealand Post and Telegraph Corps became a separate corps, the New Zealand Corps of Signals and the railway battalions were disbanded. In the same year the Corps of New Zealand Engineers were retitled as the Regiment of New Zealand Engineers, but reverted to the former name in 1923.

=== Second World War ===
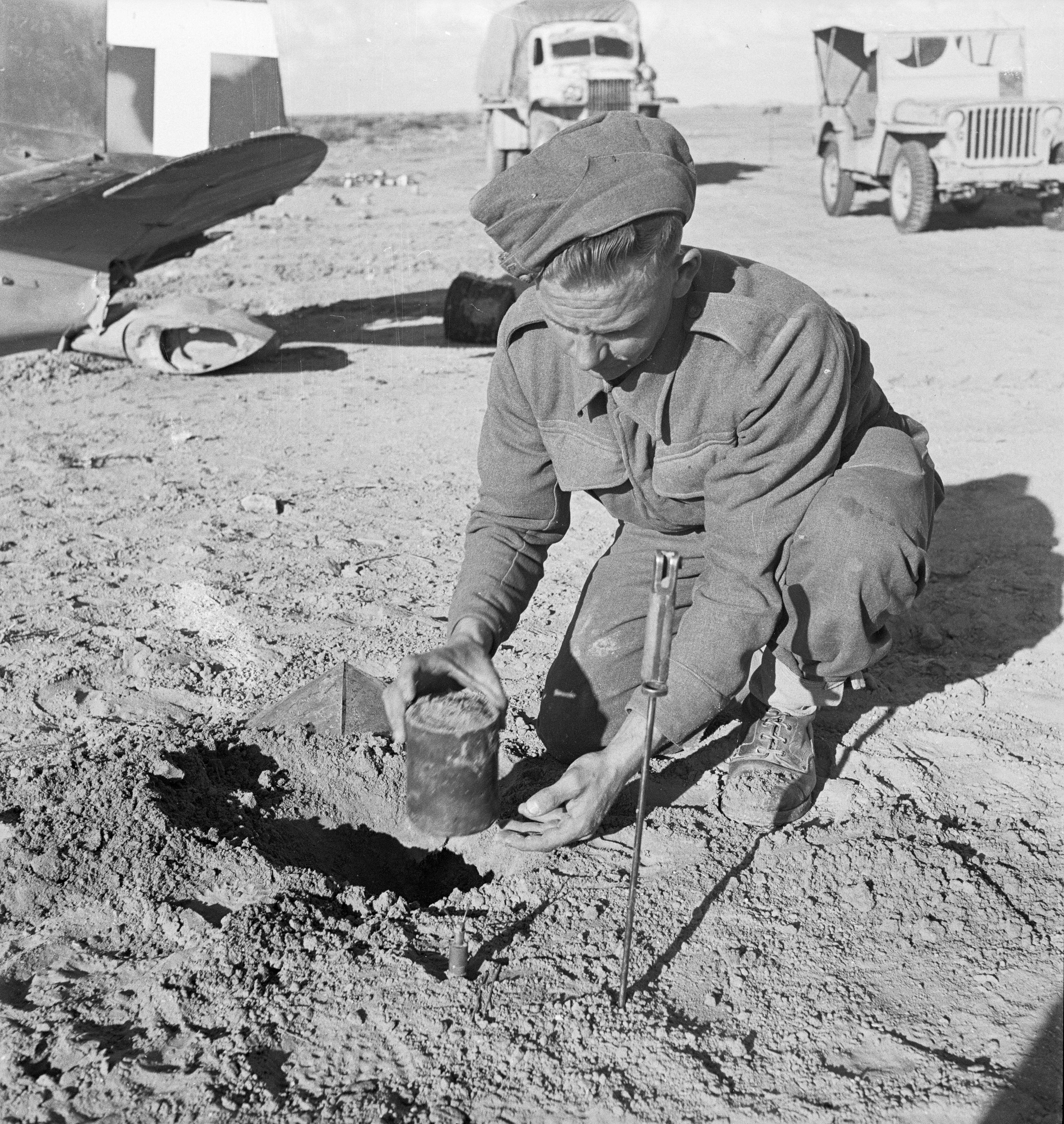
A sapper clearing a German S-mine in Libya, 1943

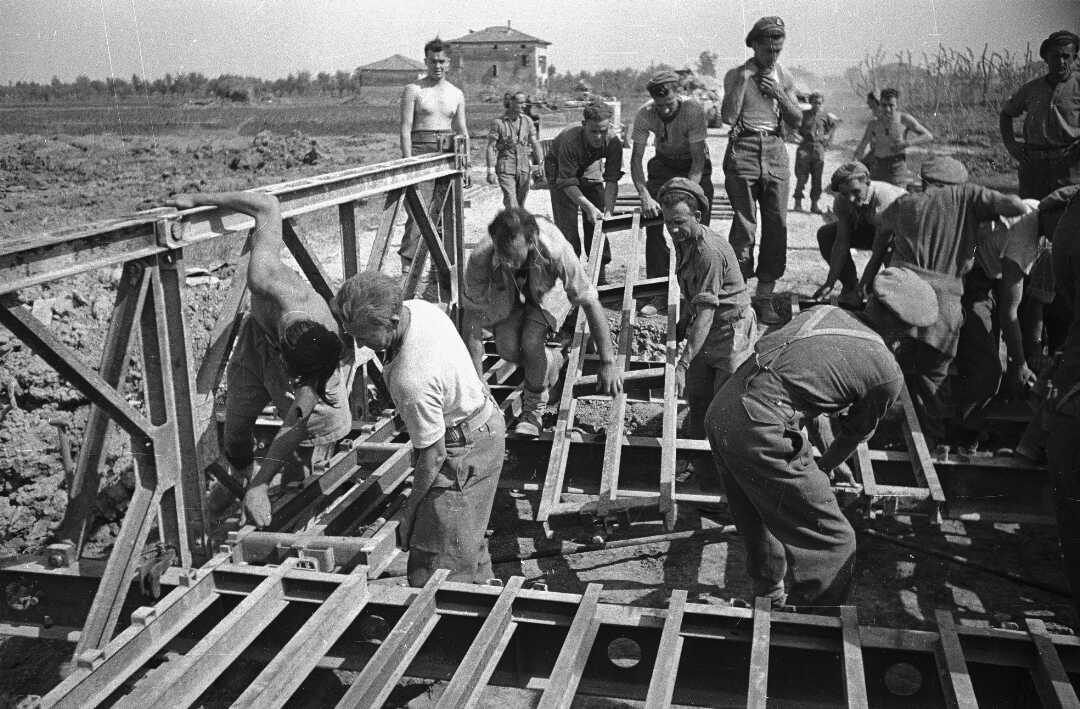
New Zealand Engineers construct a Bailey bridge over a canal near Bologna, 1945

During the Second World War the Corps of New Zealand Engineers provided engineering support to the 2nd New Zealand Expeditionary Force. Three field companies, one for each brigade, were formed as part of the 2nd New Zealand Division. The field companies first saw action in 1941 during the battles of Greece, and Crete and were mostly involved in the demolition of infrastructure to try and slow the German advance. During Operation Crusader the engineers mostly operated as infantry, but following the axis counter attack in 1942, were employed in the construction of minefields at the El Alamein line. During the Second Battle of El Alamein, the engineers played a vital role in clearing German minefields for the allied forces to advance through. The primary role of the engineers continued to be mine clearing during the allied advance across the Western desert and into Tunisia in late 1942 and early 1943.

Other non-divisional engineer companies were also formed to support logistics and transportation. By 1940 seven railway companies had been formed and were involved in the construction and operation of railways in Egypt and Libya. In 1942 the New Zealand engineers laid 400 km of new track across the western desert in 265 days and operated the first train to cross the El Alamein line following the breakout. Three forestry companies were formed in 1940 and were sent to England to fell and mill timber. By September 1942 the output of the New Zealand Forestry group exceeded that of all the other forestry groups (British, Canadian and Australian) combined. Two of the forestry companies were disbanded in 1943 and the remaining one was sent to Algeria and then Italy, before also being disbanded in 1944.

The 2nd New Zealand Division was deployed to Italy in 1943 and the new environment required the field companies to take on a new role as bridge builders. The New Zealand Engineers were soon proficient in the rapid construction of both pontoon bridges and modular Bailey bridges. The construction of these bridges was critical to the advance of allied forces and instrumental in the crossing of major rivers such as the Sangro, Senio, Santerno and Po. In March 1945 an armoured engineer squadron was also formed. The squadron was equipped with a range of specially modified Sherman and Valentine tanks used for bridge laying and supported the advance of the 4th New Zealand Armoured Brigade.

The 3rd New Zealand Division, which served in the Pacific, also contained three field companies, even though the division's third brigade was never fully formed. These units were generally engaged in the construction of infrastructure behind the front line, although they did support the landing at the Battle of the Green Islands where they suffered their only combat casualties of the war. A small number of officers were also seconded to the British Indian Army and took part in the Burma Campaign.

A large number of engineering units were formed in New Zealand to defend against a potential Japanese invasion. A total of 13 companies were formed and attached to the 1st, 4th and 5th divisions. A further 19 companies were formed by mobilising the Public Works Department as a military organisation called the Defence Engineering Service Corps.

The Corps of New Zealand Engineers suffered around 310 fatalities during the second world war. (Note: McGibbon claims the Corps of New Zealand Engineers suffered 312 fatal casualties during the Second World War, while Cody claims 303 deaths in the Mediterranean, and Europe and Sage claims 12 deaths in the Pacific)

=== Cold War ===
In 1947 the various administrative corps of the New Zealand Military forces were granted the prefix "Royal". It was argued by some generals that the earlier Corps of Royal New Zealand Engineers had technically not been disbanded in 1908 and could be resurrected by simply transferring the personnel of the New Zealand Engineers to it. This proposal was, however, rejected by the Army Board who determined that the RNZE had indeed been disbanded. The New Zealand Engineers were therefore granted the royal title on 12 July 1947, but due to a clerical error were listed by the abbreviated name, "New Zealand Engineers" (omitting "Corps of"), and subsequently became the Royal New Zealand Engineers. The error was rectified in 1953 and the formal name was changed to the Corps of Royal New Zealand Engineers.

Throughout the cold war the RNZE were deployed overseas alongside New Zealand and other Commonwealth forces. A company of engineers served with Jayforce as part of the British Commonwealth Occupation Force of Japan and during the Korean War an engineer section was attached to the 28th Engineer Regiment of the 1st Commonwealth Division. Engineers were also attached to the battalions of the New Zealand Regiment stationed in Malaya during the 1960s and supported various units of the 1st Australian Task Force during the Vietnam War. The engineers were also stationed in Singapore as part of a forward presence in Asia. The New Zealand engineers were initially part of the 28th ANZUK Field Squadron in the early 70s, but were later attached to 1st Battalion, Royal New Zealand Infantry Regiment stationed in Singapore until 1989.

The primary unit of the RNZE based in New Zealand during the 1950s was 1st Field Engineer Regiment which was to support the division sized 3rd New Zealand Expeditionary Force. With the end of compulsory military training in 1958 and the downsizing of the RNZE, the regiment was disbanded in 1962. The RNZE were organised as independent squadrons until the formation of 2nd Engineer Regiment in 1993.

=== Recent history ===
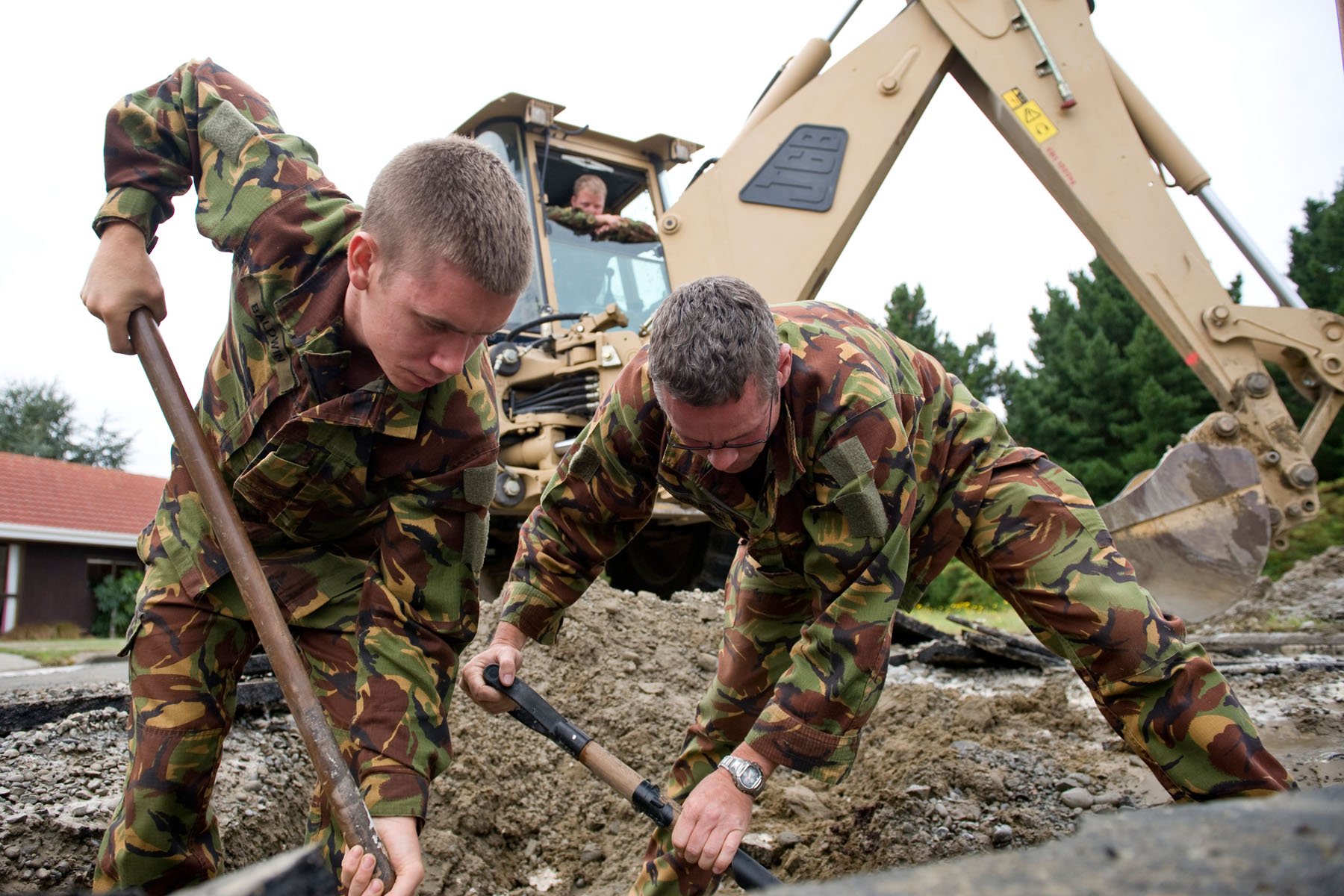
Sappers repairing water mains following the 2011 Christchurch earthquake

Since the 1980s the RNZE has been primarily deployed on peace keeping and disaster relief missions. An engineer section was attached to the New Zealand company group deployed to Bosnia to quell ethnic conflict from 1994 till 1996. The engineers continued to be deployed to Bosnia until as late as 2001 to support reconstruction. In response to the 1999 East Timorese crisis New Zealand deployed a battalion group, which contained an engineer troop, to East Timor as part of INTERFET. Following renewed unrest in 2006, the engineer were once again deployed to East Timor, eventually leaving in 2012. In 2003 New Zealand deployed the provincial reconstruction team to Afghanistan. Despite the name, the provincial reconstruction team was intended to provide security to Bamyan Province and thereby enable reconstruction by other organizations. The engineers deployed as part of the provincial reconstruction team did not have any construction capability and only oversaw work by contractors from other governments and agencies. The provincial reconstruction team was withdrawn from Afghanistan in 2013. Although New Zealand did not join the American-led coalition which invaded Iraq in 2003, RNZE sappers were deployed to Iraq in 2004 to provide humanitarian and reconstruction support. A RNZE troop was attached to 38th Engineer Regiment, Royal Engineers and repaired bridges, schools and water treatment plants in Basra.

Over the last three decades RNZE sappers have deployed to a large number of pacific island nations, including the Cook Islands, Fiji, Samoa, Tonga and Vanuatu, to support disaster relief following cyclones. Additionally, the corps deployed to Tuvalu and Tokelau during the 2011 drought and set up water filtration and reverse osmosis systems. The RNZE has also been active in disaster relief within New Zealand. The engineers were deployed to Christchurch within two hours following the 2011 earthquake. The RNZE were immediately tasked with repairing the city's water supply, but also supported the stabilization, repair and demolition of buildings and other infrastructure. The corps also assisted in clearing slips along State Highway 70 following the 2016 Kaikōura earthquake.

== Current Role ==
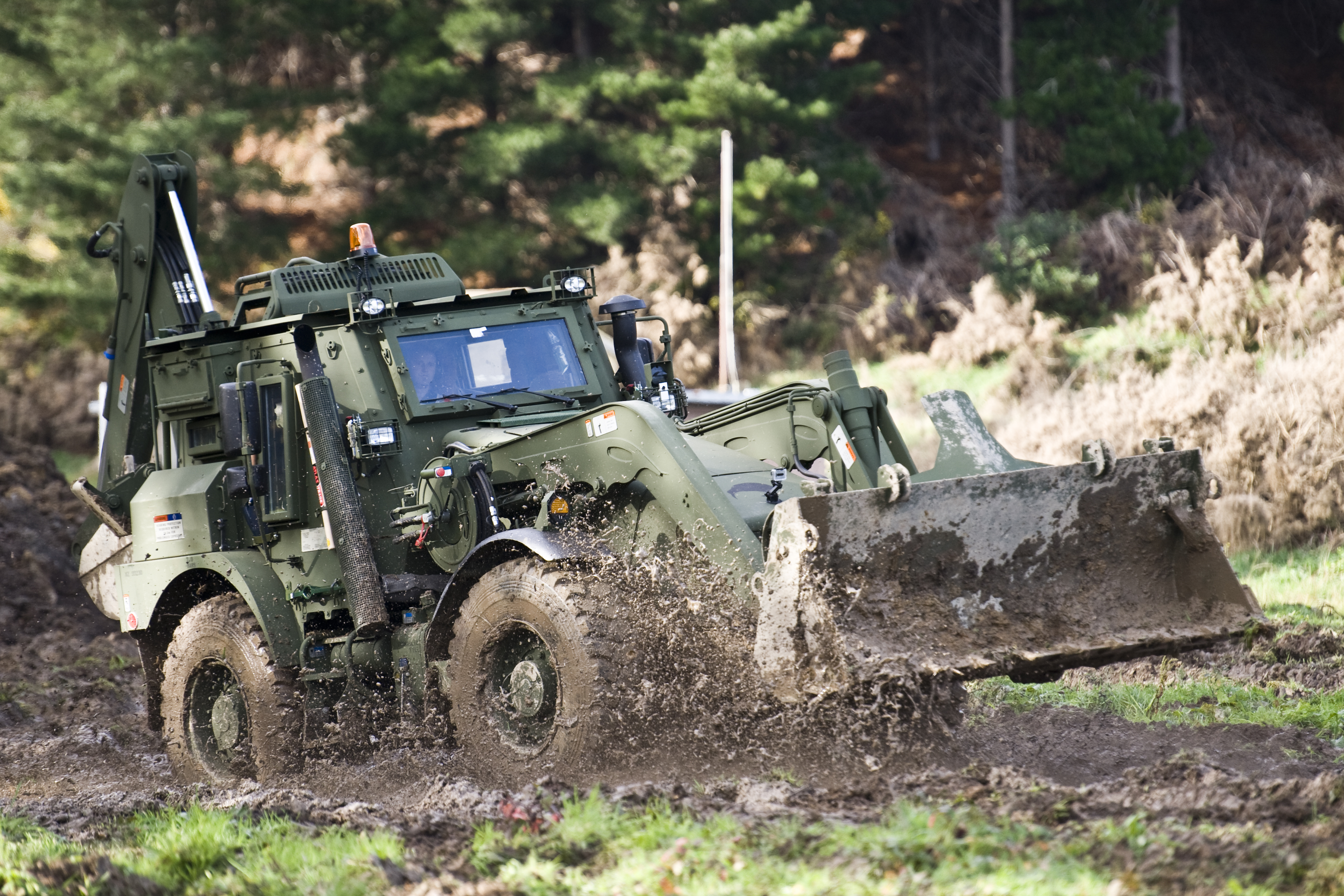
JCB High Mobility Engineer Excavator operated by the Royal New Zealand Engineers

The primary role of the Corps of Royal New Zealand Engineers is to provide mobility and counter mobility capabilities to the New Zealand Army. More generally, the corps provides military engineering support including construction, water purification and reticulation, CBRN defense, bridging, firefighting and demolitions. When not fulfilling an engineering role, the secondary role of sappers is to act as infantry.

To fulfil these duties the corps is equipped with a variety of engineering vehicles. At total of six JCB High Mobility Engineer Excavators have been acquired by the New Zealand Army, which include and armoured cab, enabling the corps to clear roads and obstacles in a combat environment. Bridging can be achieved using the rapidly emplaced bridging system which is mounted on a 8x8 HX-77 MAN truck. The system can bridge a twelve meter gap in ten minutes and is strong enough to support the weight of an NZLAV. In the late 2000s 2nd Engineer Regiment operated a troop of NZLAVs to support the then mechanized 1st Battalion, Royal New Zealand Infantry Regiment. The NZLAVs were transferred to Queen Alexandra's Mounted Rifles in the early 2010s when 1st Battalion was converted to light infantry, but the engineers continue to have access to engineering NZLAVs when necessary.

== Organisation ==
The Corps of Royal New Zealand Engineers currently consists of a single regiment, 2nd Engineer Regiment, based at Linton Military Camp and contains both regular and reserve components. It is organised as follows:

2nd Engineer Regiment

- Headquarters Squadron
- 2nd Field Squadron
- 3rd Field and Emergency Response Squadron
- 25th Engineer Support Squadron

The 2nd Field, and 3rd Field and Emergency Response Squadrons provide combat engineering support to the 1st and 2/1st Battalions of the Royal New Zealand Infantry Regiment, respectively. The 3rd Field Squadron is based at Burnham Military Camp, while the and Emergency Response Squadron has one troop based at each of Linton, Burnham and Waiouru camps. The emergency response troops were formerly the camp fire brigades and provide emergency services to the military camps and the surrounding area. 25th Engineer Support Squadron provides disaster relief and civil support.

The School of Military Engineering is based at Linton Camp, and contains the Technical Training Wing and the Combat Engineer Wing. Since 1995 the school also provides firefighting training to personnel from the Royal New Zealand Air Force.

Although not a part of the RNZE organisation the Engineer Corps Memorial Centre, Library and Chapel are also based at Linton Camp.

== Traditions ==
=== Sappers ===
The most junior enlisted rank of the Royal New Zealand Engineers is Sapper, rather than private which is used in most other corps. Additionally any member of the corps can be informally referred to as a sapper.

=== Motto ===
The official motto of the Royal New Zealand Engineers is "ubique quo fas et gloria ducunt" (everywhere, where right and glory lead). In practice, however, the phrase is split into two separate mottos, "ubique" and "quo fas et gloria ducunt". The motto was originally granted to the Royal Engineers in 1832 and later adopted by the New Zealand Engineers.

=== Uniforms and insignia ===
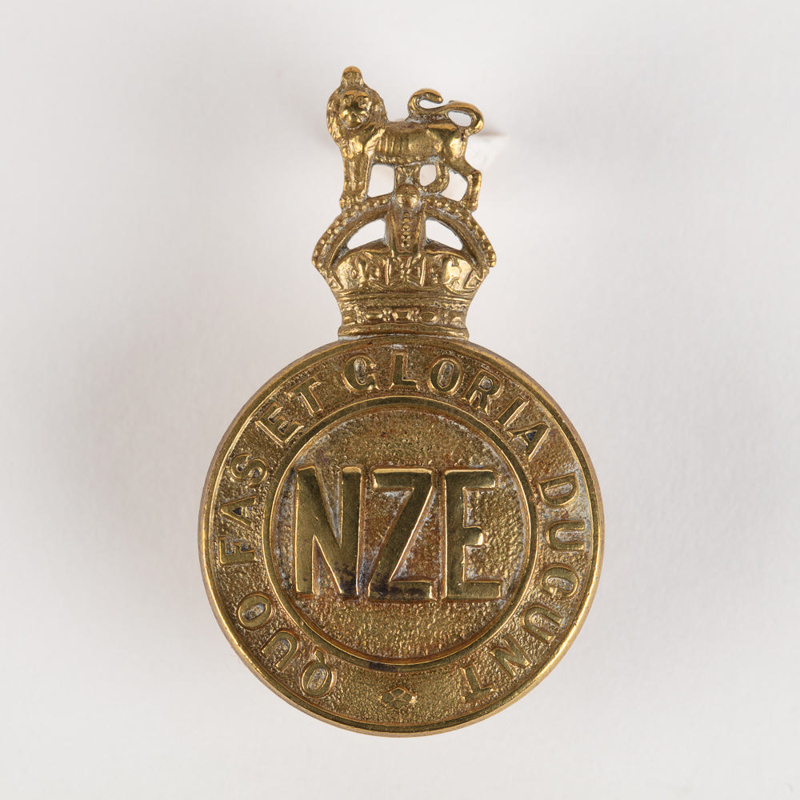
Cap badge of the New Zealand Engineers prior to 1947

Camp flag of the Royal New Zealand Engineers

The badge of the New Zealand Engineers was a simple circle bearing the acronym "NZE" and the motto "quo fas et gloria ducunt", surmounted by the Royal crest. After attaining royal status in 1947 a cap badge identical to that of the Royal Engineers was adopted, except with the scroll inscribed with "Royal N.Z. Engineers" in place of "Royal Engineers". The badge contains the Royal cypher, "EIIR", standing for "Elizabeth II Regina", encircled by a garter adorned with the motto "honi soit qui mal y pense" (shame on him who thinks evil of it) taken from the Order of the Garter.

The collar badge worn by the Royal New Zealand Engineers is a grenade with a scroll inscribed with "ubique". The New Zealand Tunneling Company instead used the Māori translation of the motto, "inga whai katoa", on their collar badges. The grenade badge has nine flames, in contrast to the very similar seven flame badge of the Royal New Zealand Artillery.

The corps colours are purple navy and post office red which were reputedly the colours of the Board of Ordnance. They are also interpreted as representing the blue tunics worn by the Royal Engineers prior to 1813 and the red tunics which replaced them. (Note: The tunics of the Royal Engineers were technically scarlet from 1813 and only changed to infantry red in 1832.) The colours are reflected in the corps stable belt, which is red with two blue stripes, and the corps flag, which is similarly coloured and embroidered with the corps badge.

=== Colonel-in-Chief ===
The Colonel-in-Chief is the ceremonial head and patron of the corps. The position was first held by Lord Kitchener, who served in the role from 1911 until his death in 1916. Kitchener was himself a former Royal Engineer and some of the RNZE regimental silver comes from the Kitchener estate. The second Colonel-in-Chief was Prince George, Duke of Kent. The Duke of Kent held the position from 1938 until his death in 1942. The third and most recent Colonel-in-Chief was Queen Elizabeth II, who held the position from 1953 until her death in 2022.

=== Alliances ===
The Corps of Royal New Zealand Engineers is allied with:

- United Kingdom – Corps of Royal Engineers
- Australia – Corps of Royal Australian Engineers

=== Freedoms ===
The Corps of Royal New Zealand Engineers has been granted the freedoms of:

- Levin (1959)

Various sub-units have also been granted freedoms including:

- Greymouth (2nd Works Section, 1971)
- Akaroa (3rd Field Squadron, 1974)
- Petone (6th Independent Field Squadron, 1985)
- Banks Peninsula (3rd Field Squadron, 1994)

== Order of precedence ==
Preceded by Royal New Zealand Armoured Corps	New Zealand Army Order of Precedence	Succeeded by Royal New Zealand Corps of Signals

== Notes ==
Footnotes

Citations
