= New Zealand in the Vietnam War =

- Part of the Vietnam War
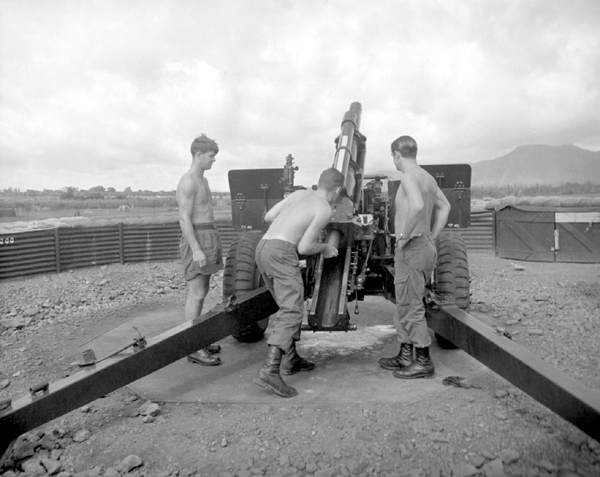
- New Zealand artillerymen carry out a fire mission in South Vietnam
- Location: Republic of Vietnam
- Commanded by: Keith Holyoake
- Objective: Prevent Communist victory in South Vietnam
- Date: June 1964 – December 1972
- Executed by: Total: 3,890 personnel In country peak: 543 personnel (January 1969)
- Casualties: 37 killed 187 injured

New Zealand's role in the 1955-1975 Vietnam War was controversial, sparking widespread protest at home from anti-Vietnam War movements modelled on their American counterparts. This conflict was also the first in which New Zealand did not fight alongside the United Kingdom, instead following the loyalties of the ANZUS Treaty.

New Zealand decided to send troops to Vietnam in 1964 because of Cold War concerns and alliance considerations. The potential adverse effect on the ANZUS alliance of not supporting the United States (and Australia) in Vietnam was central. It also upheld New Zealand's perceived national interests of countering communism in Southeast Asia.

The government wanted to maintain solidarity with the United States, but was unsure about the likely outcome of external military intervention in Vietnam. Prime Minister Keith Holyoake decided to keep New Zealand involvement in Vietnam at the minimum level deemed necessary to meet allied expectations.

== History ==
=== Initial contributions ===
New Zealand's initial response was carefully considered and characterised by Prime Minister Keith Holyoake's cautiousness toward the entire Vietnam question. While it was considered that New Zealand should support South Vietnam, as Holyoake alleged;

Whose will is to prevail in South Vietnam? The imposed will of the North Vietnamese communists and their agents, or the freely expressed will of the people of South Vietnam?

The government preferred minimal involvement, with other South East Asian deployments already placing a strain on New Zealand's armed forces. From 1961, New Zealand came under pressure from the United States of America to contribute military and economic assistance to South Vietnam, but refused. At that time, aircraft were tasked to deliver supplies to Da Nang on the way from RAF Changi to Hong Kong from time to time.

In 1962, Australia sent advisors, as the United States had, but again New Zealand refused to make a similar contribution.

==== Civilian Surgical Team ====
In April 1963, New Zealand confined its assistance to sending a civilian surgical team. The surgical team was initially made up of seven men and would eventually grow to sixteen, and remained in the country until 1975. The doctors and nurses who worked there were all volunteers from New Zealand hospitals. The team worked for civilians at the Binh Dinh Province Hospital, in Qui Nhon, an overcrowded and dirty facility almost completely lacking equipment and bedding. It would be the last New Zealand Government agency to withdraw from Vietnam. Lesley Estelle Cowper, while on leave from the Royal New Zealand Army Nursing Corps, served as a nurse with the Surgical Team in Qui Nhon. She became seriously ill after contracting tuberculosis and died in a Saigon hospital on 2 May 1966.

In 1975, as North Vietnamese columns approached Qui Nhon, the civilian surgical team was withdrawn to Saigon. The RNZAF evacuated them and other New Zealanders, including embassy staff, shortly before the capital’s fall on 30 April 1975. They were the first New Zealanders to arrive and last to leave Vietnam.

==== New Zealand Army Detachment Vietnam (NEWZAD) ====
Under continuing American pressure, the government agreed during 1963 to provide a small non-combatant military force, but the deteriorating political situation in Saigon led to delays. Not until June 1964 did twenty-five Army engineers from the Corps of Royal New Zealand Engineers arrive in South Vietnam. On the same day of their arrival, a small headquarters unit established in Saigon. Based at Thủ Dầu Một, the capital of Bình Dương Province, the New Zealand Army Detachment Vietnam (NEWZAD) engineers were engaged in reconstruction projects, such as road and bridge building, until July 1965.

==== Non-military economic assistance ====
New Zealand non-military economic assistance would continue from 1966 onward and averaged at US$347,500 annually. This funding went to several mobile health teams to support refugee camps, the training of village vocational experts, to medical and teaching equipment for Hue University, equipment for a technical high school and a contribution toward the construction of a science building at the University of Saigon. Private civilian funding was also donated for 80 Vietnamese students to take scholarships in New Zealand.

=== Military assistance ===
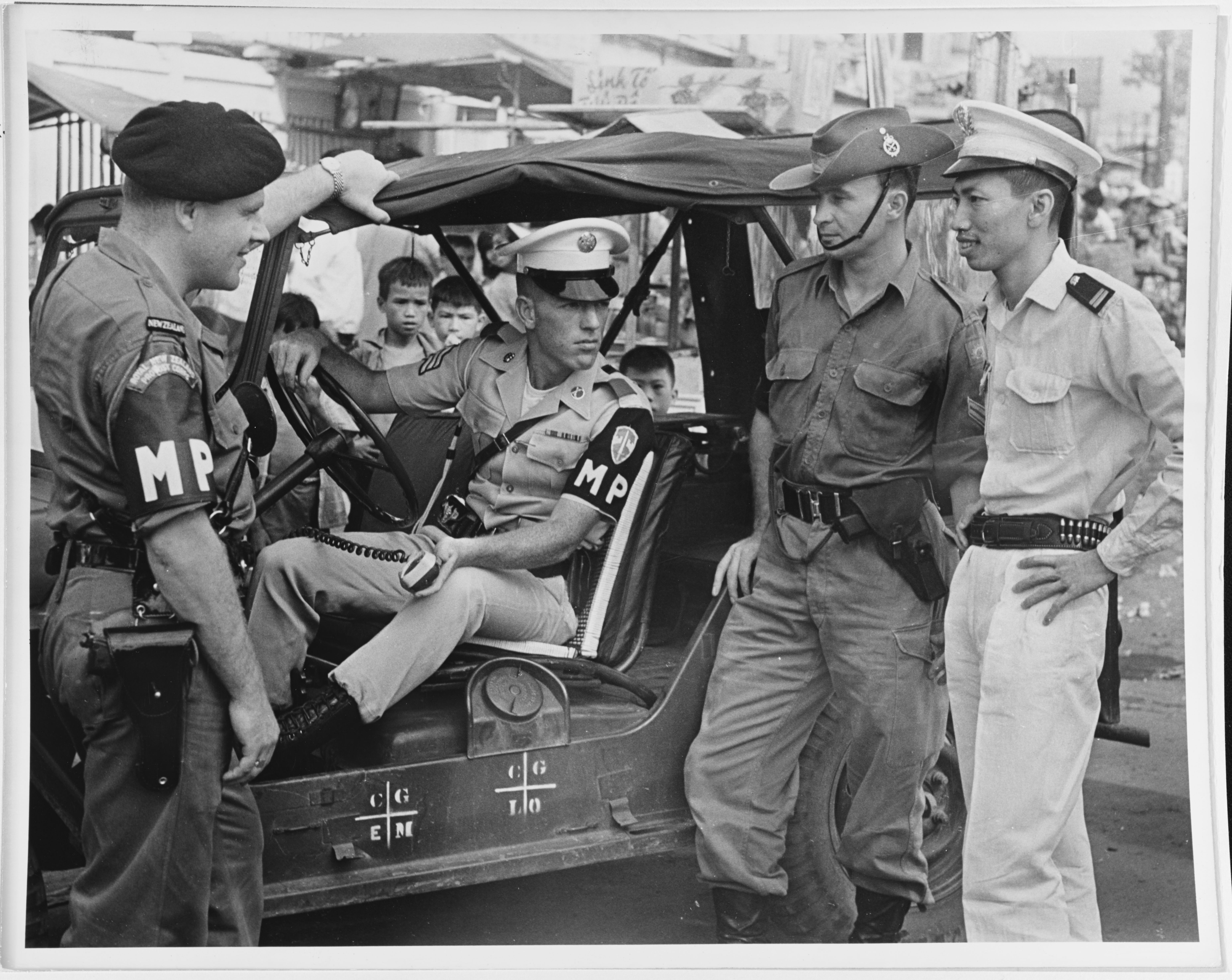
New Zealand, U.S, and Australian military police meet with a local Policeman in Saigon, Vietnam

American pressure continued for New Zealand to contribute military assistance, as the United States would be deploying combat units (as opposed to merely advisors) itself soon, as would Australia. Holyoake justified New Zealand's lack of assistance by pointing to its military contribution to the Indonesia-Malaysian Confrontation, but eventually the government decided to contribute. It was seen as in the nation's best interests to do so—failure to contribute even a token force to the effort in Vietnam would have undermined New Zealand's position in ANZUS and could have had an adverse effect on the alliance itself. New Zealand had also established its post-Second World War security agenda around countering communism in South-East Asia and of sustaining a strategy of forward defence, and so needed to be seen to be acting upon these principles.

The New Zealand headquarters established in Saigon in 1964 was renamed "Headquarters Vietnam Force" (HQ V Force) on 2 July 1965. The administration of the subsequent New Zealand forces was managed here involving military personnel from all New Zealand branches of service including Military Police. New Zealand Military Police patrolled with Australian Military Police and U.S Military Police as part of security operations of U.S. Naval Support Activity Saigon which was responsible for the protection of U.S personnel and installations in Saigon. The New Zealanders and Australians also protected their own personnel and installations within the security net.

On 4 December 1965 a car bomb explosion in Saigon claimed the life of one member of HQ V Force and injured three others. No further HQ V Force members were injured during the remainder of New Zealand's time in Vietnam.

==== Royal New Zealand Artillery (RNZA) ====
Gunners of 161 Battery RNZA conduct a fire mission during Operation Coburg, 1968

On 27 May 1965 Holyoake announced the government's decision to send 161 Battery, Royal New Zealand Artillery to South Vietnam in a combat role. The New Zealand Army Detachment (NEWZAD) engineers were replaced by the Battery in July 1965, which consisted of nine officers and 101 other ranks and four 105 mm L5 pack howitzers (later increased to six, and in 1967 replaced with 105 mm M2A2 Howitzers).

===== U.S 173rd Airborne Brigade =====
161 Battery was initially under command of the United States Army's 173rd Airborne Brigade which had arrived to Vietnam two months before and was based at Bien Hoa Base Camp northeast of Saigon. 1st Battalion, Royal Australian Regiment, the first of Australia's ground forces, arrived a month before the New Zealanders and were also under command of the 173rd. New Zealand artillery supported U.S. and Australian infantry operations for 12 months. Sergeant Alastair John Sherwood Don and Bombardier Robert White of 161 Bty were the first New Zealand casualties of the Vietnam War when the front of their Land Rover was blown up by a Vietcong command detonated mine during a convoy on 14 September 1965.

In June 1966, the Australian forces were detached from the 173rd and given their own Tactical area of responsibility and tasked with establishing a base at Nui Dat ("Dirt Hill"), in Phuoc Tuy Province thus becoming the 1st Australian Task Force.

===== 1st Australian Task Force =====
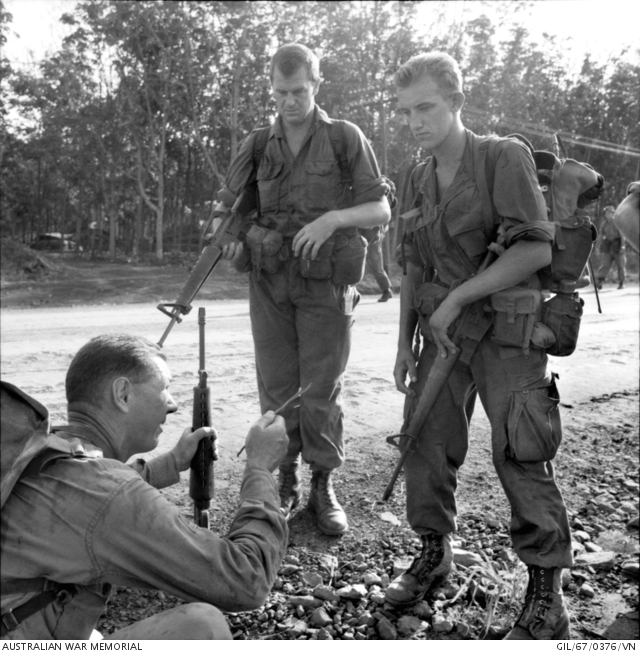
New Zealand Forward Observers with a Sergeant from 7RAR, Vietnam 1967

At the same time, the New Zealand government was given the choice of allowing the New Zealand battery to remain at Bien Hoa with the 173rd under U.S. command or integrate with the new Australian task force. It was decided the battery would join 1ATF and serve with Royal Australian Artillery field regiments. Forward Observers for the battery would patrol with all infantry companies of the Australian and New Zealand infantry while on operations, as they did with American and Australian infantry during their time under the 173rd, to direct artillery support when called upon.

The gunners were noted for their key role in assisting the 6th Battalion, Royal Australian Regiment (6 RAR), during the Battle of Long Tan on 18 August 1966. The battery also played important roles during the Tet Offensive and the Battle of Coral–Balmoral in 1968. The Battery left Vietnam in May 1971 after providing virtually continuous fire support usually in support of Australian and New Zealand infantry units for six years, with over 750 men having served with the Battery with a loss of five casualties during the period of its deployment.

==== New Zealand Services Medical Team (NZSMT) ====
New Zealand's military presence in South Vietnam was increased in April 1967 with the arrival of the 1st New Zealand Services Medical Team, a 19-strong detachment consisting of medical personnel from the Royal New Zealand Air Force, Royal New Zealand Navy and Royal New Zealand Army Medical Corps under the U.S Military Public Health Assistance Programme (MILPHAP). The team's role was to provide medical and surgical assistance to South Vietnamese civilians and developing local knowledge in this field. The New Zealanders relieved a United States Army medical team at Bong Son, to the north of Qui Nhon where the New Zealand Civilian Surgical Team operated, also in Bình Định Province. In addition to civilian casualties, they also treated military casualties who were brought to the Bong Son Dispensary, including Army of the Republic of Vietnam personnel and Viet Cong prisoners.

In June 1969, the team moved to the new 100-bed Bong Son Impact Hospital. The average bed-state was 92 and approximately 46,000 outpatients (mostly civilians) were treated annually before the team's withdrawal in December 1971. Overall there were 98 personnel involved over the four-and-a-half years of the Team's deployment: 47 from the Army, 27 from the Air Force and 24 from the Navy.

One RNZAF member of the NZSMT, Sgt Gordon Watt, was killed by a booby trap in 1970.

==== Royal New Zealand Infantry Regiment (RNZIR) ====
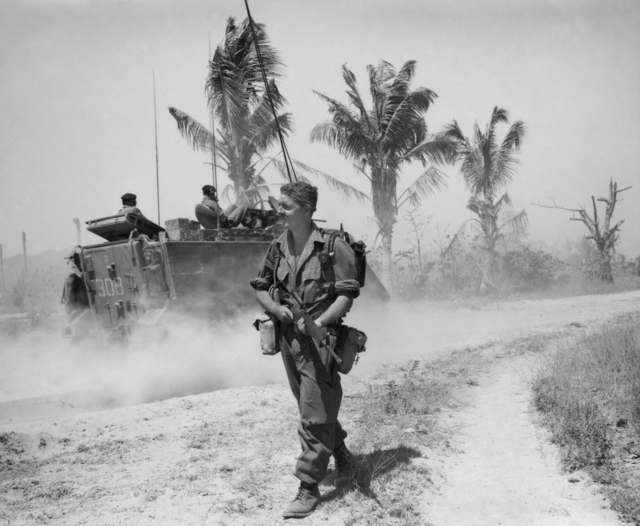
A soldier from W Company, 2RAR/NZ (ANZAC) in April 1968

In 1966, when Confrontation came to an end and Australia decided to expand the 1st Australian Task Force, New Zealand came under pressure to increase its commitment too and did so. In May 1967, a 182-man rifle company, (Victor One Company) was deployed to Vietnam from the 1st Battalion of the Royal New Zealand Infantry Regiment in Malaysia. The first Victor Company served a 6-month tour of duty. In December a second Victor Company was deployed to Vietnam and was joined by Whisky Company in December, both from the 1st Battalion.

Both companies served in the 1st Australian Task Force in Nui Dat, Phuoc Tuy Province. Initially Whisky Company served under operational control of 3rd Battalion, Royal Australian Regiment (3RAR) which arrived at the same time as Whisky Company, while Victor 2 Company continued to serve under 2nd Battalion, Royal Australian Regiment (2RAR.) A NZ Component was established at Nui Dat to manage national administration of the New Zealand contingents within 1 ATF.

Following agreement between the Australian and New Zealand Governments in late February 1968, V2 Company and W Company and A, B, and C Companies of 2RAR were amalgamated to become 2RAR/NZ (ANZAC) Battalion (2RAR/NZ) from 1 March 1968. The new "ANZAC Battalion" was the only Australian battalion to have five rifle companies. The 2IC was filled by RNZIR Officer, Major Robert Ian Thorpe.

In May 1968 Victor 2 was replaced by Victor 3. Hereafter the tour of duty for all RNZIR companies was extended to twelve months. On 1 June 2 RAR was replaced by 4th Battalion, Royal Australian Regiment (4 RAR) and the joint Australian and New Zealander infantry forces became 4 RAR/NZ (ANZAC) again with a New Zealander as 2IC, Major ATA Mataira. On 8 November 1968 the first Whisky Company left Vietnam and was replaced by a second Whisky Company.

On 16 April 1969, 1 ATF was advised of a change to operational priorities, with top priority given to eradicating the Viet Cong presence and influence among the civilian populations, followed by the upskilling of the South Vietnamese military forces. These programs were known as "Pacification" and "Vietnamization" respectively as part of the "Winning Hearts And Minds" strategy being undertaken by the Americans. 1 ATF would be increasingly called upon to provide support to a number of civil community reconstruction projects and assist in the training of South Vietnamese forces.

On 19 May 1969, 4 RAR was replaced by 6 RAR and the two RNZIR rifle companies merged with A, B and D Companies of 6 RAR to become 6 RAR/NZ (ANZAC). The battalion 2IC was RNZIR officer Major Neville Alan Wallace. On this tour Mortar and Assault Pioneer Sections were added to each of the New Zealand companies.

The New Zealand infantry companies in 6 RAR/NZ played major roles in two extremely significant and successful operations conducted by the 1st Australian Task Force in 1969 and 1970. The first was Operation Marsden (3–28 December 1969) in which Victor 3 Company discovered the major part of the K76A Hospital in the mountains where local enemy headquarters were located and from which the hospital was the major provider of medical services to all communist forces in the area. Additionally, between Victor 3 and one other Australian company approximately 1.5 tonnes of pharmaceuticals were captured which was thought to be the largest amount ever seized in the war by allied forces. The discovery of the hospital would prove to be a major defeat for the Communist forces in the area. The second was Operation Townsville (20 March – 23 April 1970) which resulted in Victor Company finding the headquarters of the main Viet Cong supply group and capturing the operational signals codes and one-time cipher pads used by the Viet Cong headquarters. As a result, senior U.S. commanders including General CW Abrams, Commander USMACV were alleged to have referred to it as "the biggest intelligence coup of the war."

As with other infantry companies of the Australian battalions, the New Zealand infantry companies too sometimes conducted independent operations or were temporarily put under the operational control of 1 ATF directly or under other Australian Battalions or units, and conducted operations with them, e.g. Whisky 3 Company's mortar section conducted numerous independent operations with 3rd Cavalry Regiment in 1970, and the Company itself spent some time on Long Sơn Island directly under 1 ATF Command, and later under 8 RAR for some months, also in 1970. Both RNZIR companies conducted a number of independent, company-level land clearing and mine sweeping operations providing security for Australian and American engineer teams. Several ARVN units underwent training under both New Zealand companies at various times.

At the end of April 1970, a new 2 RAR from Australia and new Victor Company from Singapore arrived and on 15 May, Whisky 3 (now six months into their tour) and Victor 5 merged with 2 RAR to become for the second time 2 RAR/NZ (ANZAC). The 2IC for this rotation was RNZIR Major Roy Thomas Victor Taylor. This tour continued to be focused mainly upon the "Pacification" programme which 1 ATF had adopted as its first priority in April 1969.

Whisky 3 Company was withdrawn without replacement in November 1970. To offset Whisky 3's withdrawal, in January 1971 the New Zealand government committed the 1st New Zealand Army Training Team (1 NZATTV) to Vietnam. 1 NZATTV was made up of advisors from all branches of service, a number of whom had served in the RNZIR companies and in other New Zealand branches of service. The team assisted an American training team at the ARVN Training Center in Chi Lang to train South Vietnamese platoon commanders in weapons and tactics.

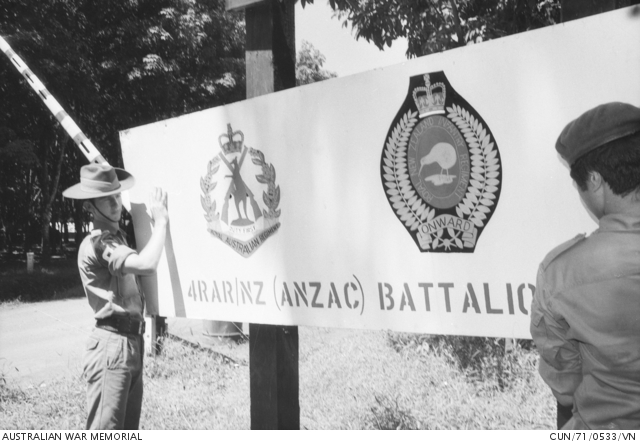
4RAR/NZ (ANZAC) sign at Nui Dat, November 1971

On 6 May 1971 Victor 5 was replaced by Victor 6 and on 22 May 2 RAR was replaced by 4 RAR. The final and sole New Zealand infantry company was integrated with B, C, and D companies of 4 RAR to become 4 RAR/NZ (ANZAC) for the second time. This would be the final ANZAC Battalion before Australian and New Zealand combat troops were withdrawn in December 1971. The 2IC for the final ANZAC Battalion rotation was RNZIR Major Donald Stuart McIver.

With the battalion's tour cut short, Victor 6's last operation was one of protecting the activities of 1 ATF's withdrawal from South Vietnam.

As the last 1 ATF battalion left, 4 RAR/NZ moved the South Vietnamese forces fully into the Nui Dat base. The majority of 4 RAR/NZ withdrew from Nui Dat to Vũng Tàu on 7 November 1971. The Australians departed on 8 December and the New Zealanders departed on 9 December.

Over the five-year period, more than 1,600 New Zealand soldiers of the nine NZ rifle companies engaged in a constant round of jungle patrols, ambushes, and cordon-and-search operations in both battalion and independently conducted operations, for a loss of 24 killed and 147 wounded.

Additionally, RNZIR personnel served in administrative roles at the New Zealand HQ V Force in Saigon, in support and logistic roles within the ANZAC Battalions at Nui Dat, and in the 1st Australian Logistics Support Group (1 ALSG.) Both New Zealand Army training teams consisted mainly of RNZIR personnel.

==== Royal New Zealand Navy (RNZN) ====
The Royal New Zealand Navy did not make a sea contribution to New Zealand's military involvement in the Vietnam War, but otherwise contributed personnel beginning in April 1967 with RNZN medical members being part of the tri-service New Zealand Services Medical Team (NZSMT.) Subsequently, a few served with the second of the two New Zealand training teams deployed to Vietnam after combat troops withdrew in 1971.

==== Royal New Zealand Air Force (RNZAF) ====
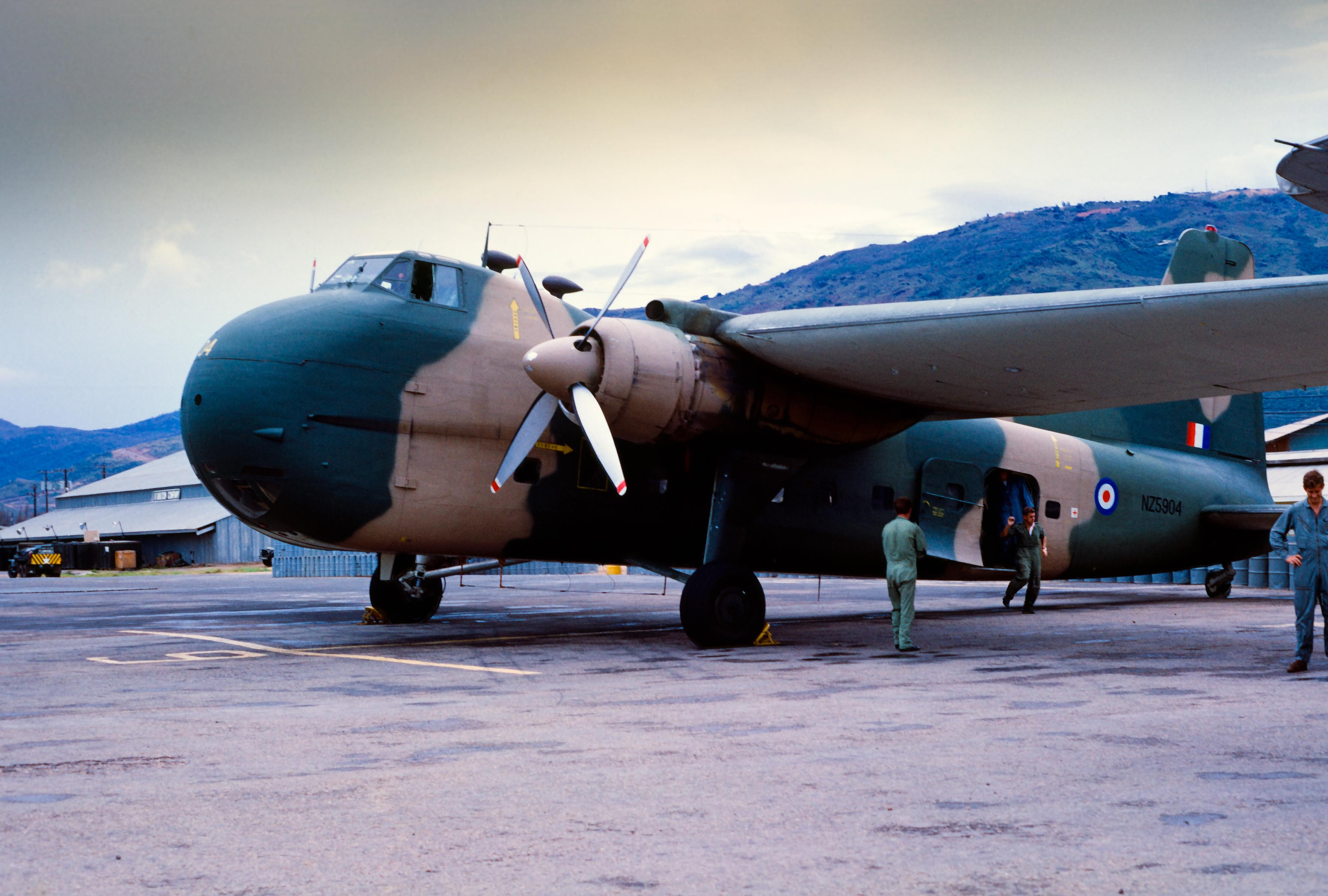
No. 41 Squadron Bristol Freighter NZ5904 at Qui Nhon, Vietnam 1969

===== Transportation =====
The RNZAF's involvement in the Vietnam War preceded New Zealand's subsequent non-military and military contributions and continued up to the Fall of Saigon.

From 1962 the Royal New Zealand Air Force contribution was in the form of transportation. Flights from Singapore to Hong Kong would sometimes stop off at airports and bases in Vietnam on the way there or back to deliver people and supplies. This became a regular schedule as the war intensified and New Zealand became more involved.

The initial New Zealand Civilian Surgical Team sent to Qui Nhon in 1963 were flown to their destination by No. 40 Squadron RNZAF which later flew personnel in and out of New Zealand's HQ V Force headquarters in Saigon. The RNZAF inserted the initial NEWZAD engineering team sent in 1964, the RNZA battery in 1965, the first New Zealand infantry troops in 1967, and the NZ SAS in 1968.

When the 1st Australian Task Force base was established at Nui Dat in 1966 a landing strip was built which was just long enough to accommodate the large Bristol Freighters in use by 40 Sqn.

At the same time, No. 41 Squadron RNZAF provided resupply missions to South East Asia from the Royal Air force base in Singapore and from New Zealand, usually via Australia. 41 Sqn flew C130 Hercules freighters. Over the thirteen years of the Vietnam War, 41 Sqn made 1,979 landings into the conflict.

Flights to support the civilian medical team at Qui Nhon, and the New Zealand embassy in Saigon continued after the withdrawal of New Zealand ground forces in 1971.

In early April 1975 the squadron established a detachment at Tan Son Nhat International Airport near Saigon to evacuate New Zealand personnel from the country as North Vietnamese forces rapidly advanced. The last No. 41 Squadron flight out of the country departed on 21 April carrying 38 embassy staff (including the New Zealand Ambassador) and refugees, just prior to the fall of Saigon.

===== Forward air controllers =====
Over 20 RNZAF personnel served as forward air controllers with the USAF 20th Tactical Air Support Squadron at Da Nang Air Base, and USAF 19th Tactical Air Support Squadron at Bien Hoa Air Base.

===== RAAF pilots =====
From mid-1967 16 RNZAF pilots and crew from No. 3 Squadron RNZAF served with No. 9 Squadron RAAF based in Vung Tau, flying Bell UH-1 Huey helicopters in support of Australian and New Zealand troops.

===== U.S Marine Corps Attachment =====
A small detachment of RNZAF A-4 Skyhawk pilots were attached to the U.S. Marine Corps VMA-311 (Marine Attack Squadron 311), Marine Aircraft Group 12, at Chi Lang in 1970.

===== New Zealand Services Medical Team =====
RNZAF personnel were numerous in the New Zealand Services Medical Team (NZSMT) and one went on to be part of the subsequent New Zealand Army Training Team (NZATTV.)

One RNZAF member of the NZSMT, Sgt Gordon Watt, was killed by a booby trap in 1970, the RNZAF's only casualty of the war. A plaque and memorial to Sgt Watt is on display at the Ohakea Base Medical flight, and there is also the "Gordon Watt Memorial Award" for the RNZAF's top medic award, named in his honour.

==== New Zealand Special Air Service (NZSAS) ====
In November 1968, New Zealand's contribution to the 1st Australian Task Force was increased by the deployment of 4 Troop, New Zealand Special Air Service, comprising an officer and 25 other ranks. The arrival of this Troop raised New Zealand's deployment to Vietnam to its peak – 543 men. The Troop was attached to the Australian SAS Squadron at Nui Dat and carried out long-range reconnaissance and the ambushing of enemy supply routes, mounting 155 patrols over three tours until being withdrawn in February 1971.

Although under operational command of the Australian SAS Squadron Commander when deployed into the field on operations, 4 Tp NZSAS was an independent command and self-sufficient.

On 14 January 1970 Sergeant G.J. Campbell was killed in action, being the first and only fatal NZSAS casualty during the unit's time in Vietnam.

==== Corps of Royal New Zealand Engineers (RNZE) ====
===== NEWZAD construction team =====
New Zealand's first non-combat contribution to Vietnam were the NEWZAD engineers from Corps of Royal New Zealand Engineers sent in 1964. The NEWZAD team spent nine months in Vietnam on construction activities before being replaced by the RNZE engineers that came out ahead of the arrival of the RNZA battery in July 1965.

===== Site establishment and preparations =====
Each time New Zealand military contribution to South Vietnam increased, a work party of RNZE engineers was sent to assist in preparing the site for the new arrivals. These RNZE Detachments helped set up the NZ artillery battery when it moved from Bien Hua to Nui Dat in September 1966 and again for Victor One Company RNZIR from early November to December 1967. The final detachment was sent to assist 1 NZATTV establish themselves in Chi Lang in November 1970. This detachment stayed in South Vietnam until February 1971.

===== 1st Australian Task Force and HQ V Force headquarters =====
Other personnel of the RNZE also served in the 1st Australian Logistics Support Group (1 ALSG), at HQ V Force headquarters, and with 198 Works Section, Royal Australian Engineers.

===== Combat engineering =====
Sappers from the Royal New Zealand Engineers accompanied the RNZIR infantry patrols as Assault pioneers to assist with mine clearing, demolition, and Combat engineering tasks. Several RNZE personnel also served in these capacities with the NZSAS. Two RNZE sappers were killed while serving with the RNZIR infantry companies.

Additionally, Lieutenant Colonel Kenneth Charles Fenton RNZE, was administratively in charge of all New Zealand forces in Vietnam, at the New Zealand Headquarters in Saigon (V Force HQ) from 25 July 1968 to 30 July 1970.

==== Royal New Zealand Electrical and Mechanical Engineers (RNZEME) ====
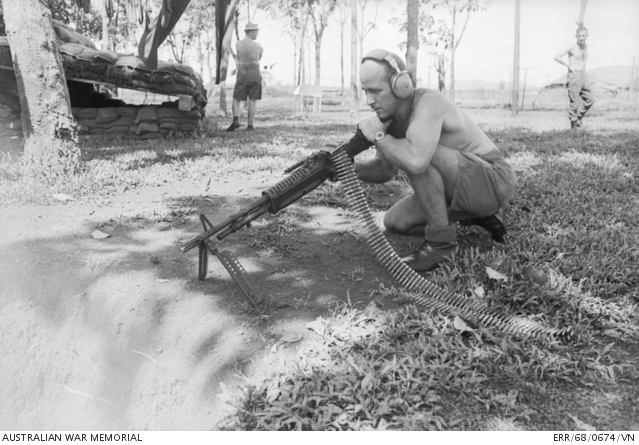
A New Zealand engineer from the Light Aid Detachment of 12th Field Artillery Regiment test-fires a M60 machine gun at Nui Dat, 1968

When 161 Battery, RNZA arrived in Vietnam in 1965 a detachment of engineers from the Royal New Zealand Electrical and Mechanical Engineers formed the Logistic Support Element (LSE), to service the battery. 161 Bty served under command of the U.S. 173rd Airborne Brigade from 1965 to 1966. When the 1st Australian Task Force was established and moved to Nui Dat in Phuoc Tuy Province in 1966, the LSE was detached from the battery and established within the 1st Australian Logistic Support Group (1 ALSG) at Vung Tau. RNZEME personnel who had been in the LSE were taken for the most part into the Light Aid Detachment (LAD) of the Australian Artillery Field Regiments which 161 Bty was integrated with.

RNZEME tradesmen also served with the New Zealand Services Medical Team in the town of Bong Son, in the Binh Dinh Province.

Some RNZEME personnel served in the RNZIR rifle companies, the ANZAC Battalions (Command & Support), as well as at the New Zealand V Force HQ in Saigon. The initial NEWZAD deployment included a few RNZEME personnel, as did the latter NZATTV.

==== Royal New Zealand Army Ordnance Corps (RNZAOC) ====
The Royal New Zealand Army Ordnance Corps did not contribute a standalone unit to Vietnam but provided individuals to serve in various Australian and New Zealand units. A number of RNZAOC personnel initially served with the New Zealand Logistic Support Element (LSE) which supported 161 Battery RNZA during its time serving under the U.S. 173rd Airborne Brigade and before the LSE was detached from the battery and incorporated into the 1st Australian Logistic Support Group (1 ALSG) at Vung Tau in 1966. Some 50 RNZAOC personnel served in the headquarters of 1 ALSG thereafter. Along with other New Zealand branches of service, RNZAOC personnel went about their business with their Australian counterparts in all aspects of 1 ALSG's support functions for Australian and New Zealand forces in Vietnam. Other RNZAOC members served with the New Zealand headquarters (HQ V Force) in Saigon, 1 ATF headquarters at Nui Dat, 161st (Independent) Reconnaissance Flight, 161 Battery RNZA, the RNZIR rifle companies, and with their Australian, Korean, and U.S Navy counterparts at the 29th General Support Group of the U.S Army's Long Binh Post. One member also served in 1 NZATTV.

==== Royal New Zealand Armoured Corps (RNZAC) ====
The Royal New Zealand Armoured Corps was not represented as its own unit in Vietnam and members instead served within other New Zealand and Australian units including 161 Bty RNZA, V Force HQ, the ANZAC Battalions (Command and Support), the RNZIR companies, 1 ALSG, and in the NZAATV teams.

Several members served as tank crew with the 3rd Cavalry Regiment of the Royal Australian Armoured Corps, and 1st Squadron, 4th Cavalry Regiment (U.S Army.)

Two RNZAC pilots served with the Australian 161st (Independent) Reconnaissance Flight.

Additional short-term postings included detachments to several U.S. Cavalry units.

==== Royal New Zealand Army Medical Corps (RNZAMC) ====
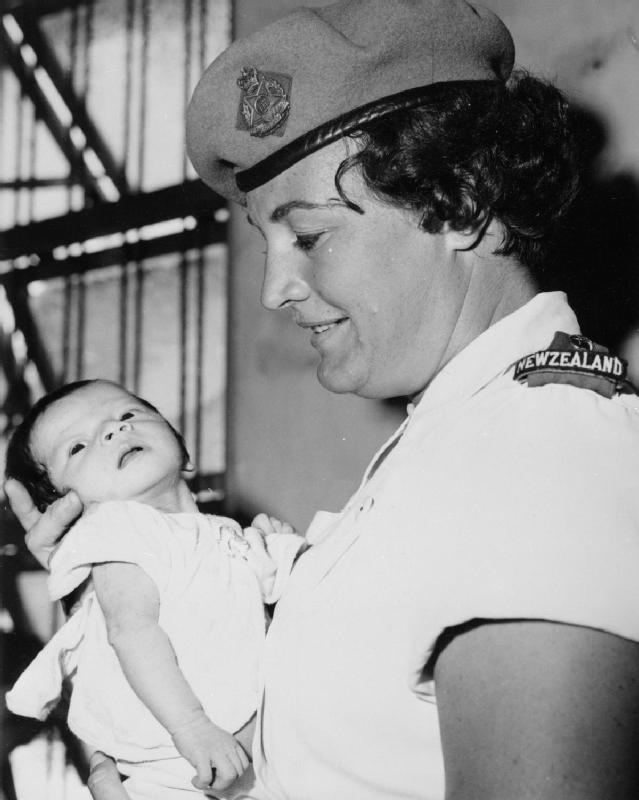
Sister Pamela Jean Miley at 1st Australian Field Hospital in Vung Tau, 1969–1970

Most personnel from the Royal New Zealand Army Medical Corps served with the New Zealand Services Medical Team (NZSMT) or were medics for 161 Bty and the New Zealand infantry companies, or were otherwise stationed at the New Zealand V Force Headquarters in Saigon, and at 1 ALSG at the 1st Australian Support Compound in Vũng Tàu.

Nine New Zealand Army nurses served at the 1st Australian Field Hospital at Vung Tau. They treated soldiers with illnesses related to the climate and conditions, and were on standby to treat wounded soldiers brought in by helicopter.

After combat troop withdrawals in 1971 several RNZAMC served in the NZAATV teams.

RNZAMC Staff Sergeant Dick Grigg who was posted at HQ V Force in Saigon was one of the first New Zealand casualties of the Vietnam War when a car bomb exploded on 12 December 1965 in Saigon. Several others were wounded in the attack.

==== Royal New Zealand Army Service Corps (RNZASC) ====
Although the Royal New Zealand Army Service Corps was not represented as a unit in the New Zealand contingent to Vietnam over 140 RNZASC personnel served throughout the war providing transport and logistics for 161 Bty RNZA, the two RNZIR companies, and 4 Troop NZSAS, as well as in administration and advisory roles in New Zealand V Force HQ in Saigon, 1 ALSG, and as members of 1 NZATTV.

==== Royal New Zealand Corps of Signals (RNZSigs) ====
Members of the Royal New Zealand Corps of Signals served in all New Zealand units in Vietnam, including RNZA, RNZIR, NZSAS, V Force HQ and as part of the NZ Component at Nui Dat. Some served as intelligence officers with 1ATF. The last commander of 1NZATTV (5 Dec 1972 – 13 Dec 1972), Major TD Macfarlane, was from RNZSigs.

==== New Zealand Army Training Team Vietnam (1 NZATTV & 2 NZATTV) ====
As American focus shifted to President Richard Nixon's "Vietnamization" programme – a policy of slow disengagement from the war by gradually building up the Army of the Republic of Vietnam so that it could fight the war on its own - the New Zealand government dispatched the 1st New Zealand Army Training Team Vietnam (1 NZATTV) in January 1971. This action was intended to offset the departure of the New Zealand rifle company, Whisky 3, which left in November 1970. Numbering 25 men from different branches of service of the New Zealand Army, including RNZIR, RNZA, RNZE, RNZEME, RNZAMC, RNZAC, RNZSigs, RNZASC, and RNZAOC, it assisted the United States Army Training Team at the Chi Lăng Training Center in Chau Doc Province. The team helped train South Vietnamese platoon commanders in weapons and tactics.

In February 1972 a second training team (2 NZATTV), 18 strong was deployed to South Vietnam and was based at Dong Ba Thin Base Camp, near Cam Ranh Bay. Made up of members from various New Zealand branches of service including two members from RNZN, the team helped train Khmer National Armed Forces (FANK) personnel in weapons and tactics and first aid. This team also provided first aid instruction and specialist medical instruction at Dong Ba Thin's 50-bed hospital.

The two New Zealand training teams were withdrawn from Vietnam in December 1972.

==== New Zealand attachments to United States Army, Air Force and Navy ====
37 New Zealand serviceman, mostly Commissioned Officers are recorded on the Flinkenberg List as having served with U.S. detachments during the war. These were not always formal postings as such. Some of these attachments were planned as part of officers' career planning by Defence Headquarters; others were opportunity attachments through contact with Allied commanders at many levels.

Of the 37 on the list, 20 of those were RNZAF personnel who served as attachments to various units of the United States Air Force, as Forward air controllers.

Two small RNZAF detachments were attached to U.S Marine Corps A-4 Skyhawk squadron VMA-311 at Chu Lai Air Base in January 1970 and October 1970.

Three RNZN personnel served with the US Navy on a Junior Officer Exchange programme in 1971, each posted on the aircraft carrier USS Kitty Hawk and destroyer USS William H. Standley off the coast of North Vietnam.

==== New Zealand attachments to Australian Army, Air Force, and Navy ====
Five members from various branches of the New Zealand military whom had also trained as Army pilots served with the Australian 161st Independent Reconnaissance Flight.

In 1967 two RNZAF pilots were seconded to the Royal Australian Air Force's No. 9 Squadron, which was flying UH-1 Iroquois helicopters as troop transports. Two more RNZAF pilots joined No. 9 Squadron in 1968 to fly helicopters, often in support of the Australian and New Zealand SAS. By 1971 16 New Zealand pilots had served in 9 Squadron.

Ten members from RNZAC served with the 3rd Cavalry Regiment, Royal Australian Armoured Corps.

Eleven (some say ten) RNZIR personnel served as detachments to the Australian Army Training Team Vietnam which operated in Vietnam from 1962 to 1972.

==== Distinctions and awards ====
161 Battery RNZA was awarded the United States Meritorious Unit Commendation for their service in South Vietnam while serving under the U.S. 173rd Airborne Brigade. Many New Zealand individuals received military awards for activities in Vietnam, including American military service awards and citations.

In 2019 the Australian government awarded the Australian Unit Citation for Gallantry to all members of 161 Battery for their part in the Battle of Coral-Balmoral. This is the first Australian Unit Citation for Gallantry offered to a New Zealand military unit.

=== Withdrawal ===
In line with reductions in American and Australian strength in Vietnam, New Zealand began the gradual withdrawal of its combat forces as the training teams were arriving. Prime Minister Holyoake said in 1971 that New Zealand's combat forces would be withdrawn by "about the end of this year," and they were – Whiskey Three Company went in November 1970, the SAS Troop and 161 Battery followed in February and May 1971 respectively, and Victor Six Company and the tri-service medical team left with the 1st Australian Task Force in December 1971, ending New Zealand's combat involvement in the Vietnam War.

One of the first acts of Prime Minister Norman Kirk's Labour Party government (elected in December 1972) was to withdraw both training teams and the New Zealand headquarters in Saigon. By then, a total of 3,890 New Zealand military personnel, all volunteers, had served in Vietnam from June 1964 to December 1972.

New Zealand casualties during the Vietnam War were: RNZE: 2, RNZA: 5, RNZIR: 27, RNZAF: 1, NZSAS: 1, RNZAMC: 1 (for a total of 37) and 187 wounded. Two New Zealanders serving with the United States Marine Corps, one serving in the US Army and one serving with the Australian Army were also killed in action.

The last NZ troops left Vietnam on 22 December 1972.

== Protest ==
Although New Zealand's involvement in the war was very limited compared to the contributions of some of its allies, it still triggered a large anti-Vietnam War movement at home.

New Zealand protests were similar to those in the United States – criticising the policies of the United States government and challenging seriously for the first time New Zealand's alliance-based security, calling for a more 'independent' foreign policy which was not submissive to that of the United States and denying that communism posed any real threat to New Zealand. Campaigns were also waged on moral grounds ranging from pacifist convictions to objections to the weapons being used to fight the war. In the early 1970s, anti-Vietnam war groups organised 'mobilisations', when thousands marched in protest against the war in all the country's major centres. While Prime Minister Holyoake and his government had their own misgivings about the viability of the war, they were consistent in their public belief that they were maintaining both New Zealand's foreign policy principles and treaty-bound obligations. Despite popular sentiment apparently against the conflict, especially in its final years, Holyoake's National Party was re-elected into government twice during the course of the war.

Protest chronology:

- 1967: Two members of the left-wing Progressive Youth Movement lay a protest wreath on Anzac Day in Christchurch and are subsequently convicted of disorderly behaviour. Further incidents follow at later Anzac Days as protestors seek to bring attention to their anti-war cause.
- 1967: 21 arrests during an Auckland protest against the visit of South Vietnam's Premier, Air Vice-Marshal Nguyen Cao Ky.
- 1967: On 29 October, a big fight between police and protesters occurs outside the home of the American consul at Paritai Drive in Auckland.
- 1969: Flour bombs, paint and eggs thrown in protest over a visit of a high-ranking United States politician
- 1969: Fire crackers thrown at an election meeting addressed by the Prime Minister with 30 arrests.
- 15 January 1970: US Vice President Spiro Agnew arrives in Auckland as part of a goodwill visit to US-allied South East Asian nations and is greeted by several hundred anti-war protesters. The protests turn violent after police attempt to disperse protesters. Both sides blame each other for the violence which results in many arrests.
- 1971: Protests in Dunedin reach the National Party's convention in the centre of the city, resulting in scuffles with police and two arrests.
- 30 April 1971: a nationwide anti-war demonstration attracts 30,000 people to the streets demanding New Zealand's immediate withdrawal from Vietnam.
- 1971: 161 Battery during a welcome home parade was attacked by a small group of protestors with red paint, the protestors claimed the red paint was for the blood spilled by Vietnamese during the war.
- There are also numerous protests at Anzac Day, especially in Christchurch, where anti-war activists attempt to lay wreaths commemorating the dead of both sides, or 'victims of fascism in Vietnam'.

The protest movement is backed by Norman Kirk's Labour government which supports a prompt withdrawal of New Zealand troops. New Zealand troops are quickly withdrawn without much controversy after the Labour Party's return to office in 1972. The protests mark a split in foreign policies between the two major political parties of Labour and National. While National continues to support a stronger alliance with the United States, the anti-war protests convince the Labour government that a new and more independent New Zealand foreign policy is needed. The new foreign policy which follows as a result of these protests is the reason behind New Zealand rejecting visits from ships from the United States over anti-nuclear protests during the period of time after 1985. The anti-Vietnam War protests are often regarded as the beginning of the ANZUS alliance breakdown between New Zealand and the United States. The Vietnam War protests are still remembered on ANZAC Days in New Zealand for significance in the change of direction in New Zealand's foreign policy.

== Agent Orange ==
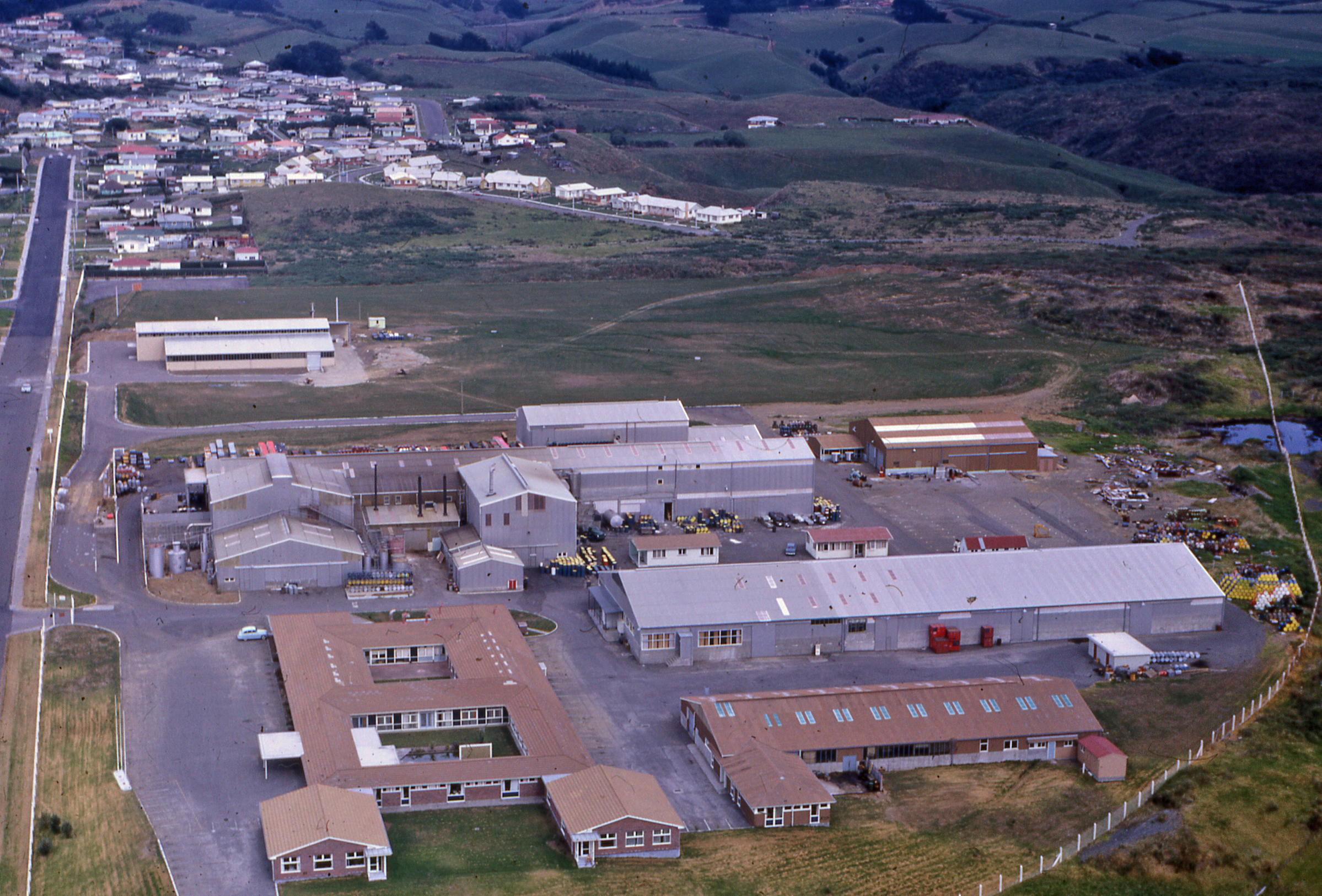
The Ivon Watkins Dow factory in New Plymouth

Like veterans from many of the other allied nations, as well as Vietnamese civilians, New Zealand veterans of the Vietnam War claimed that they (as well as their children and grandchildren) had suffered serious harm as a result of exposure to Agent Orange. In January 1984 the United States District Court of New York issued a legal notice "to all persons who served in or near Vietnam as member of the armed forces of the United States, Australia and New Zealand” resulting in an out of court settlement in September 1985 with the U.S. chemical companies that manufactured the product.

Following further investigations by the U.S. and Australian governments into allegations of health consequences from exposure to Agent Orange, the New Zealand government issued a report in 1999 called the “Reeves Report”. The Reeves Commission agreed to accept the U.S. and Australian benchmarks for determining the validity of cases.

In 2001 a study into the effects of defoliants on Vietnam veterans and their children was conducted by Veterans Affairs NZ. This investigation was poorly conducted and ignored the evidence amassed in Australia of the spraying missions that took place in Vietnam where Australian and New Zealand troops were exposed. Efforts to provide the evidence were finally successful by 2004 and the results of the investigation were published in The New Zealand Herald on 15 December 2004 where it was admitted that New Zealand Vietnam veterans were “exposed to a toxic environment”. Prime Minister Helen Clark's government apologised to Vietnam War veterans who were exposed to Agent Orange or other toxic defoliants, following the inquiry.

In 2005, a New Zealand member of parliament from New Plymouth stated that he had evidence that New Zealand supplied Agent Orange chemicals to the United States military during the conflict. The same minister later claimed to have been "mis-quoted" although this information was not reported by the Media and the claim has never been proven.

In December 2006, the New Zealand Government, the Ex-Vietnam Services Association (EVSA) and the Royal New Zealand Returned and Services Association (RNZRSA) agreed to, and signed, a Memorandum of Understanding (MoU) following the recommendations of the Joint Working Group, designated with advocacy for Veteran's concerns. The MoU provides formal acknowledgement of the toxic environment New Zealand Vietnam Veterans faced during their service abroad in Vietnam, and the after-effects of that toxin since the servicemen and women returned to New Zealand. The MoU also makes available various forms of support, to both New Zealand Vietnam Veterans and their families. New Zealand writer and historian, Deborah Challinor, includes a new chapter in her second edition release of Grey Ghosts: New Zealand Vietnam Veterans Talk About Their War that discusses the handling of the New Zealand Vietnam Veterans' claims, including the Reeves, McLeod and Health Committee reports, and the reconciliation/welcome parade on Queen's Birthday Weekend, 2008, also known as 'Tribute 08'.

From 1962 until 1987, the 2,4,5T herbicide was manufactured at an Ivon Watkins-Dow plant in Paritutu, New Plymouth for domestic use. This fact was the basis of the 2005 claim that the herbicide had been allegedly exported to U.S. military bases in South East Asia. There have been continuing claims that the suburb of Paritutu has also been polluted.

== See also ==
- Military history of Australia during the Vietnam War
- South Korea in the Vietnam War
- Canada and the Vietnam War
- Military Reenactment Society of New Zealand

== Bibliography ==
- Breen, Bob: First to Fight: Australian Diggers, N.Z. Kiwis and U.S. Paratroopers in Vietnam, 1965–66 (1988, Allen & Unwin, Australia) ISBN 0-04-320218-7
- Crosby, Ron (2009). NZSAS: The First Fifty Years. Viking. ISBN 978-0-67-007424-2.
- Eder, Rod: Deep Jay: Kiwis at War in Vietnam (1995, Tandem Press) ISBN 0-908884-55-9
- Lyles, Kevin: Vietnam ANZACs Australian & New Zealand Troops in Vietnam 1962–72 (Osprey Elite 103) (2004, Osprey Publishing Limited, Oxford) ISBN 1-84176-702-6
- McGibbon, Ian: New Zealand's Vietnam War: A history of combat, commitment and controversy (2010, Exisle, Auckland NZ & Ministry of Culture and Heritage) ISBN 978-0-908988-96-9
- Newman, Lieut Stephen D. Vietnam Gunners: 161 Battery RNZA, South Vietnam 1965–71 (1988, Moana Press, Tauranga) ISBN 0-908705-35-2
- Subritzky, Mike: The Vietnam Scrapbook The Second ANZAC Adventure (1995, Three Feathers, Blenheim) ISBN 0-9583484-0-5
- Wicksteed, Major M.R. RNZA NZ Army Public Relations pamphlet.
- Vietnam War Bibliography: Australia and New Zealand
