= Vietnam War casualties =

Civilian and military deaths during the Second Indochina War

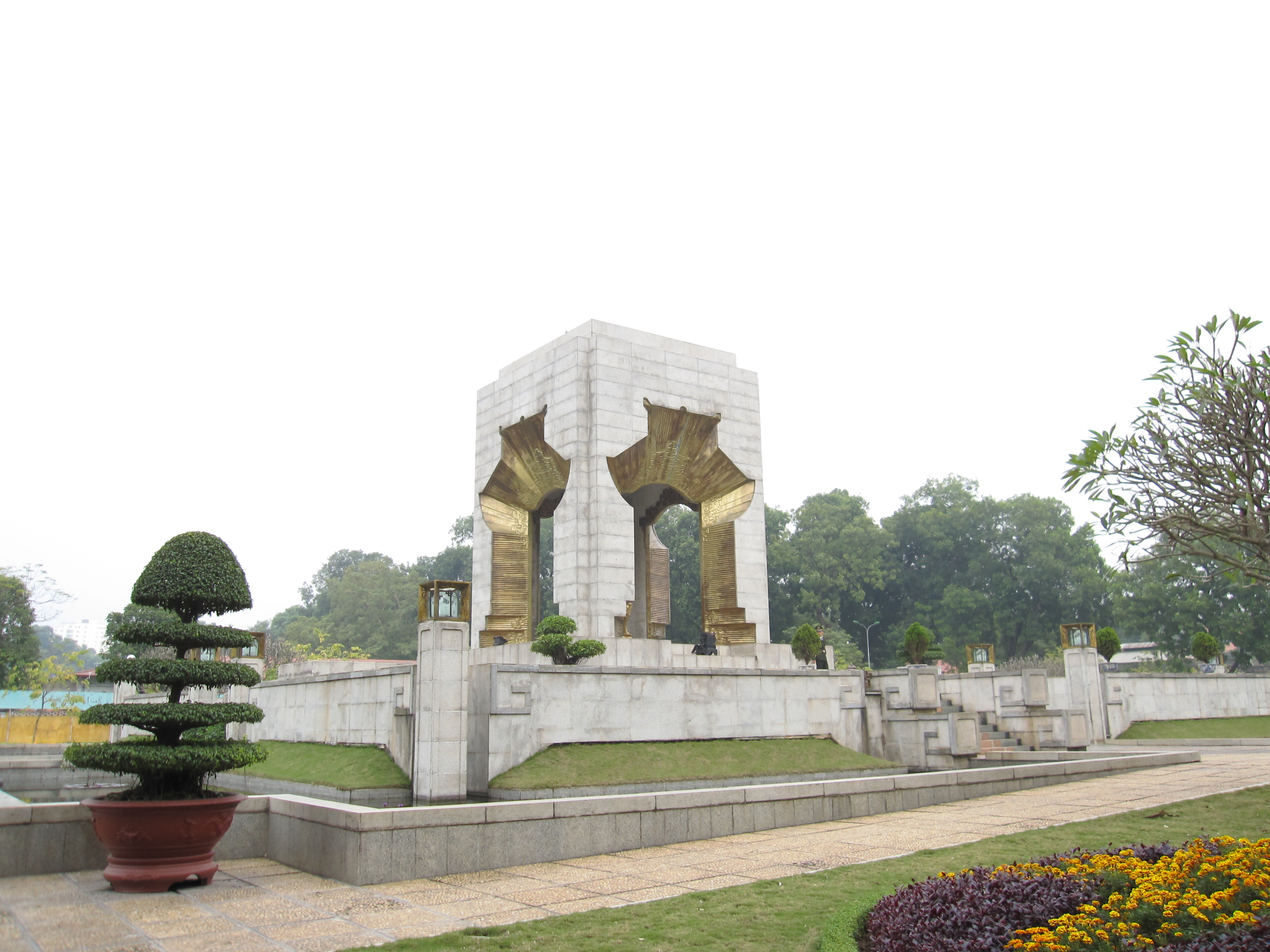
The Memorial to the Revolutionary Martyrs, Hanoi

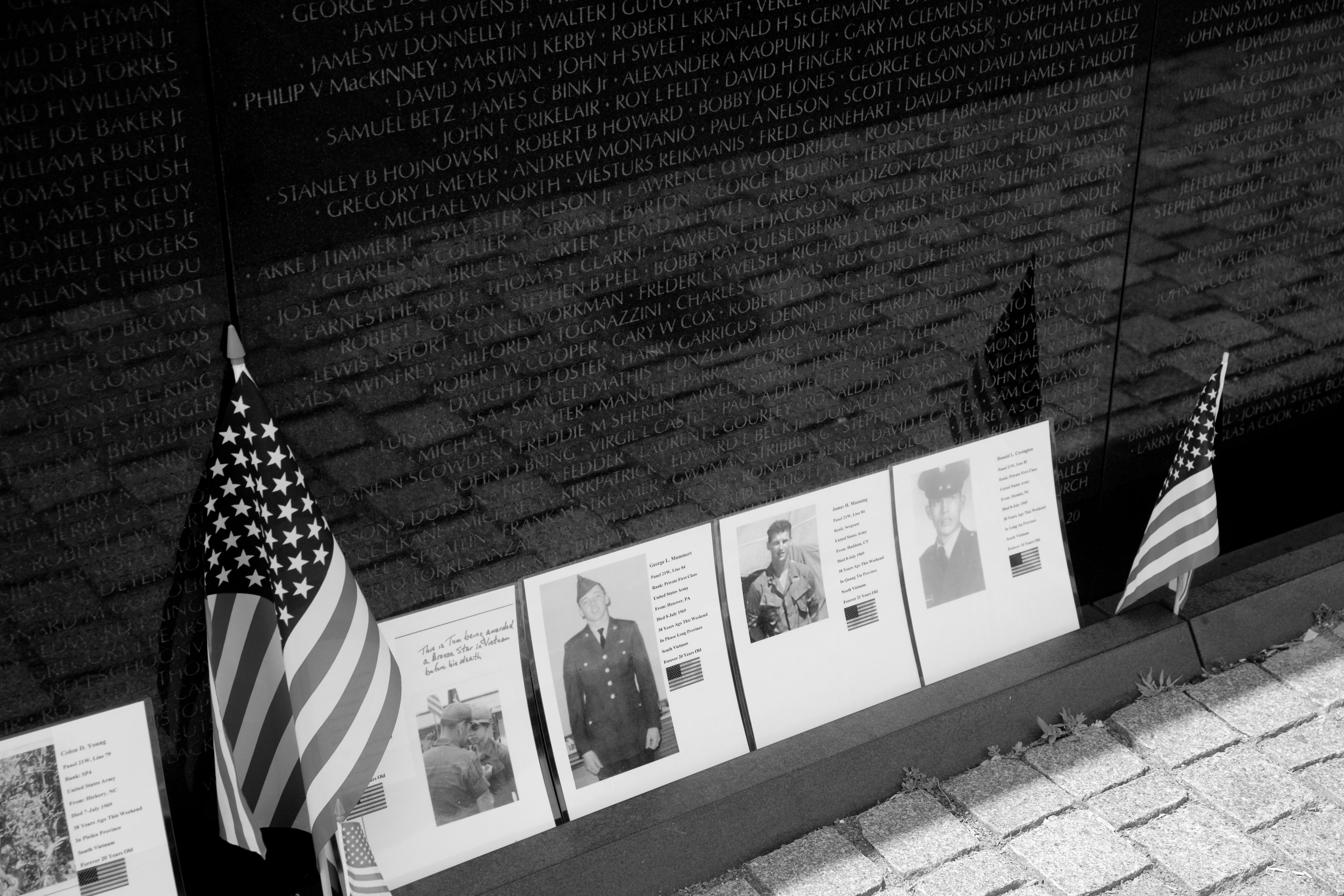
The Vietnam Veterans Memorial, Washington, D.C.

Two major war memorials commemorating the dead of the Indochina Wars

Estimates of casualties of the Vietnam War vary widely. Estimates can include both civilian and military deaths in North and South Vietnam, Laos, and Cambodia.

The war lasted from 1955 to 1975 and most of the fighting took place in South Vietnam; accordingly it suffered the most casualties. The war also spilled over into the neighboring countries of Cambodia and Laos which also endured casualties from aerial bombing and ground fighting.

Civilian deaths caused by both sides amounted to a significant percentage of total deaths. These were caused by artillery bombardments, extensive aerial bombing of North and South Vietnam, the use of firepower in military operations conducted in heavily populated areas, assassinations, massacres, and terror tactics. A number of incidents occurred during the war in which civilians were deliberately targeted or killed, the most prominent being the Massacre at Huế and the My Lai massacre.

== Total number of deaths ==
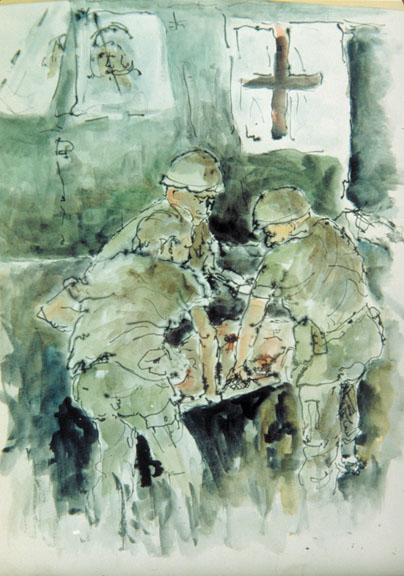
Waiting to Lift Off by James Pollock, Vietnam Combat Artists Program, CAT IV, 1967; courtesy of National Museum of the U.S. Army

Estimates of the total number of deaths in the Vietnam War vary widely. The wide disparity among the estimates cited below is partially explained by the different time periods of the Vietnam War covered by the studies and whether casualties in Cambodia and Laos were included in the estimates.

A 1975 U.S. Senate subcommittee estimated around 1.4 million civilian casualties in South Vietnam because of the war, including 415,000 deaths. An estimate by the Department of Defense after the war gave a figure of 1.2 million civilian casualties, including 195,000 deaths. According to statistics from the South Vietnamese Ministry of Health, 44.5% of civilians admitted to hospitals between 1967 and 1970 were wounded by mines or mortars, 21.2% by guns or grenades, and 34.3% by artillery or bombing.

Guenter Lewy in 1978 estimated 1,353,000 total deaths in North and South Vietnam during the period 1965–1974 in which the U.S. was most engaged in the war. Lewy reduced the number of Viet Cong (VC) and People's Army of Vietnam (PAVN) battle deaths claimed by the U.S. by 30 percent (in accordance with the opinion of United States Department of Defense officials), and assumed that one third of the reported battle deaths of the PAVN/VC may have actually been civilians. He estimates that between 30 and 46% of the total war deaths were civilians. His estimate of total deaths is reflected in the table.

Deaths in Vietnam War (1965–1974) per Guenter Lewy
US and allied military deaths	282,000
PAVN/VC military deaths	444,000–666,000
Civilian deaths (North and South Vietnam)	405,000–627,000
Total deaths	1,353,000

A 1995 demographic study in Population and Development Review calculated 791,000–1,141,000 war-related Vietnamese deaths, both soldiers and civilians, for all of Vietnam from 1965 to 1975. The study came up with a most likely Vietnamese death toll of 882,000, which included 655,000 adult males (above 15 years of age), 143,000 adult females, and 84,000 children. Those totals include only Vietnamese deaths, and do not include American and other allied military deaths which amounted to about 64,000. The study's authors stated that methodological limitations of the study include imbalance between rural and urban areas and the potential exclusion of high mortality areas. Another potential limitation is the relatively small sample size of the study.

In 1995, the Vietnamese government released its estimate of war deaths for the more lengthy period of 1955–75. PAVN and VC losses were reported as 1.1 million dead and civilian deaths of Vietnamese on both sides totaled 2.0 million. These estimates probably include deaths of Vietnamese soldiers in Laos and Cambodia, but do not include deaths of South Vietnamese and allied soldiers which would add nearly 300,000 for a grand total of 3.4 million military and civilian dead.

A 2008 study by the BMJ (formerly British Medical Journal) came up with a higher toll of 3,812,000 dead in Vietnam between 1955 and 2002. For the period of the Vietnam War the totals are 1,310,000 between 1955 and 1964, 1,700,000 between 1965–74 and 810,000 between 1975 and 1984. (The estimates for 1955–64 are much higher than other estimates). The sum of those totals is 3,091,000 war deaths between 1955 and 1975.

Uppsala University in Sweden maintains the Armed Conflict Database. Their estimates for conflict deaths in Vietnam are 164,923 from 1955 to 1964 and 1,458,050 from 1965 to 1975 for a total of 1,622,973. The database also estimates combat deaths in Cambodia for the years 1967–75 to total 259,000. Data for deaths in Laos is incomplete.

R. J. Rummel's mid-range estimate in 1997 was that the total deaths due to the Vietnam War totaled 2,450,000 from 1954 to 1975. Rummel calculated PAVN/VC deaths at 1,062,000 and ARVN and allied war deaths of 741,000, with both totals including civilians inadvertently killed. He estimated that victims of democide (deliberate killing of civilians) included 214,000 by North Vietnam/VC and 98,000 by South Vietnam and its allies. Deaths in Cambodia and Laos were estimated at 273,000 and 62,000 respectively.

Deaths in Vietnam War (1954–75) per R. J. Rummel (except where otherwise noted)
	Low estimate of deaths	Middle estimate of deaths	High estimate of deaths	Notes and comments
North Vietnam/Viet Cong military and civilian war dead	533,000	1,062,000	1,489,000	Includes an estimated 50,000/65,000/70,000 civilians killed by U.S/SVN bombing/shelling.
South Vietnam/U.S./South Korea war military and civilian war dead	429,000	741,000	1,119,000	Includes 360,000/391,000/720,000 civilians.
Democide by North Vietnam/Viet Cong	131,000	214,000	302,000	25,000/50,000/75,000 killed in North Vietnam, 106,000/164,000/227,000 killed in South Vietnam
Democide by South Vietnam	57,000	89,000	284,000	Democide is the murder of persons by or at the behest of governments.
Democide by the United States	4,000	6,000	10,000	Democide is the murder of persons by or at the behest of governments.
Democide by South Korea	3,000			Rummel does not give a medium or high estimate.
Subtotal Vietnam	1,156,000	2,115,000	3,207,000	
Cambodians	273,000	273,000	273,000	Rummel estimates 212,000 killed by Khmer Rouge (1967–1975), 60,000 killed by U.S. and 1,000 killed by South Vietnam (1967–73). No estimate given for deaths caused by Viet Cong/North Vietnam (1954–75).
Laotians	28,000	62,000	115,000	
Grand total of war deaths: Vietnam, Cambodia, and Laos (1954–75)	1,450,000	2,450,000	3,595,000	

== Civilian deaths in the Vietnam War ==
Lewy estimates that 40,000 South Vietnamese civilians were assassinated by the PAVN/VC; 300,000 were killed as a result of combat in South Vietnam, and 65,000 were killed in North Vietnam for a total of 405,000 killed. He further suggests that 222,000 civilians may have been counted as enemy military deaths by the U.S. in compiling its "body count" raising the total to 627,000 killed. It was difficult to distinguish between civilians and military personnel in many instances as many individuals were part-time guerrillas or impressed laborers who did not wear uniforms. Walter Mead estimates that approximately 365,000 Vietnamese civilians to have died as a result of the war during the period of American involvement.

In addition, an unknown number of American civilians, including 59 women, were killed during the war, while working for US governmental agencies and other organizations. Among the dead were 17 CIA officers and more than 30 pilots and other crew members of the CIA's Air America company. During the conflict, 52 US civilians went missing, after which the bodies of 24 were recovered.

=== Deaths caused by North Vietnam/VC forces ===
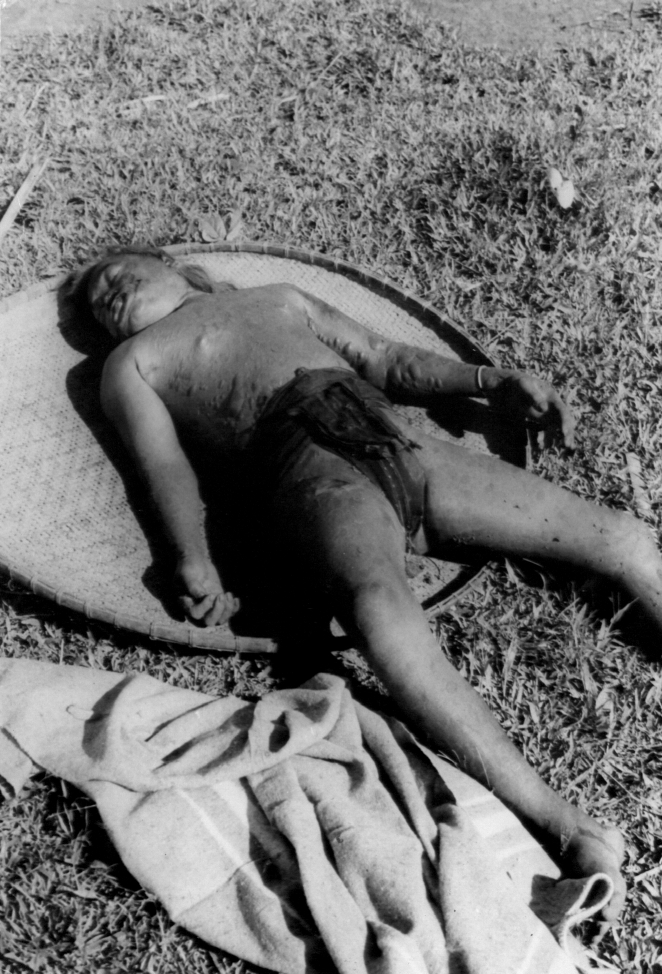
The Viet Cong killed hundreds of Montagnard villagers during the Dak Son Massacre, 1967.

R. J. Rummel estimated that PAVN/VC forces killed around 164,000 civilians in democide between 1954 and 1975 in South Vietnam, from a range of between 106,000 and 227,000, plus another 50,000 killed in North Vietnam. Rummel's mid-level estimate includes 17,000 South Vietnamese civil servants killed by PAVN/VC. In addition, at least 36,000 Southern civilians were executed for various reasons in the period 1967–1972. About 130 American and 16,000 South Vietnamese POWs died in captivity. During the peak war years, another scholar Guenter Lewy attributed almost a third of civilian deaths to the VC.

Thomas Thayer in 1985 estimated that during the 1965–72 period the VC killed 33,052 South Vietnamese village officials and civil servants.

These numbers do not include civilian and State of Vietnam/ARVN military deaths resulting from the communist collectivization and land reform in North Vietnam and mass-internment, the refugee crisis and subsequent exodus of Vietnamese people after the Fall of Saigon.

=== Deaths caused by South Vietnam ===
According to RJ Rummel, from 1964 to 1975, an estimated 1,500 people died during the forced relocations of 1,200,000 civilians, another 5,000 prisoners died from ill-treatment and about 30,000 suspected communists and fighters were executed. In Quảng Nam Province 4,700 civilians were killed in 1969. This totals, from a range of between 16,000 and 167,000 deaths caused by South Vietnam during the (Diem-era), and 42,000 and 118,000 deaths caused by South Vietnam in the post Diệm-era), excluding PAVN forces killed by the ARVN in combat. Benjamin Valentino estimates 110,000–310,000 deaths as a "possible case" of "counter-guerrilla mass killings" by U.S. and South Vietnamese forces during the war.

Operating under the direction of the C.I.A. and other U.S. and South Vietnamese Intel organizations and carried out by ARVN units alongside U.S. advisors was the Phoenix Program, intended to neutralise the VC political infrastructure, whom were the civilian administration of the Viet Cong/Provisional Revolutionary Government via infiltration, capture, counter-terrorism, interrogation, and assassination. The program resulted in an estimated 26,000 to 41,000 killed, with an unknown number possibly being innocent civilians.

=== Deaths caused by the American military ===
RJ Rummel estimated that American forces killed around 5,500 people in democide between 1960 and 1972, from a range of between 4,000 and 10,000. Estimates for the number of North Vietnamese civilian deaths resulting from U.S. bombing range from 30,000 to 65,000. Higher estimates place the number of civilian deaths caused by American bombing of North Vietnam in Operation Rolling Thunder at 182,000. American bombing in Cambodia is estimated to have killed between 30,000 and 150,000 civilians and combatants.

18.2 million gallons of Agent Orange, some of which was contaminated with Dioxin, was sprayed by the U.S. military over more than 10% of Southern Vietnam as part of the U.S. herbicidal warfare program Operation Ranch Hand during the Vietnam War, from 1961 to 1971. Vietnam's government claimed that 400,000 people were killed or maimed as a result of after effects, and that 500,000 children were born with birth defects. and studies have shown higher rates of casualties, health effects, and next-generation birth defects in Vietnamese peoples. The United States government has challenged these figures as being unreliable.

For official U.S. military operations reports, there was no established distinction between enemy KIA and civilian KIA. Since body counts were a direct measure of operational success, U.S. "operations reports" often listed civilian deaths as enemy KIA or exaggerated the number. There was strong pressure to produce body counts as a measure of operational success and enemy body counts were directly tied to promotions and commendation. The My Lai massacre was initially written off as an operational success and covered up. Sometimes civilian casualties from airstrikes or artillery barrages against villages were reported as "enemies killed". All individuals killed in declared free-fire zones, combatants or not, were considered enemy killed in action by U.S. forces. This might partially explain the discrepancies between recovered weapons and body-count figures, along with exaggeration, although the NVA and VC also went to great lengths to recover weapons from the battlefield.

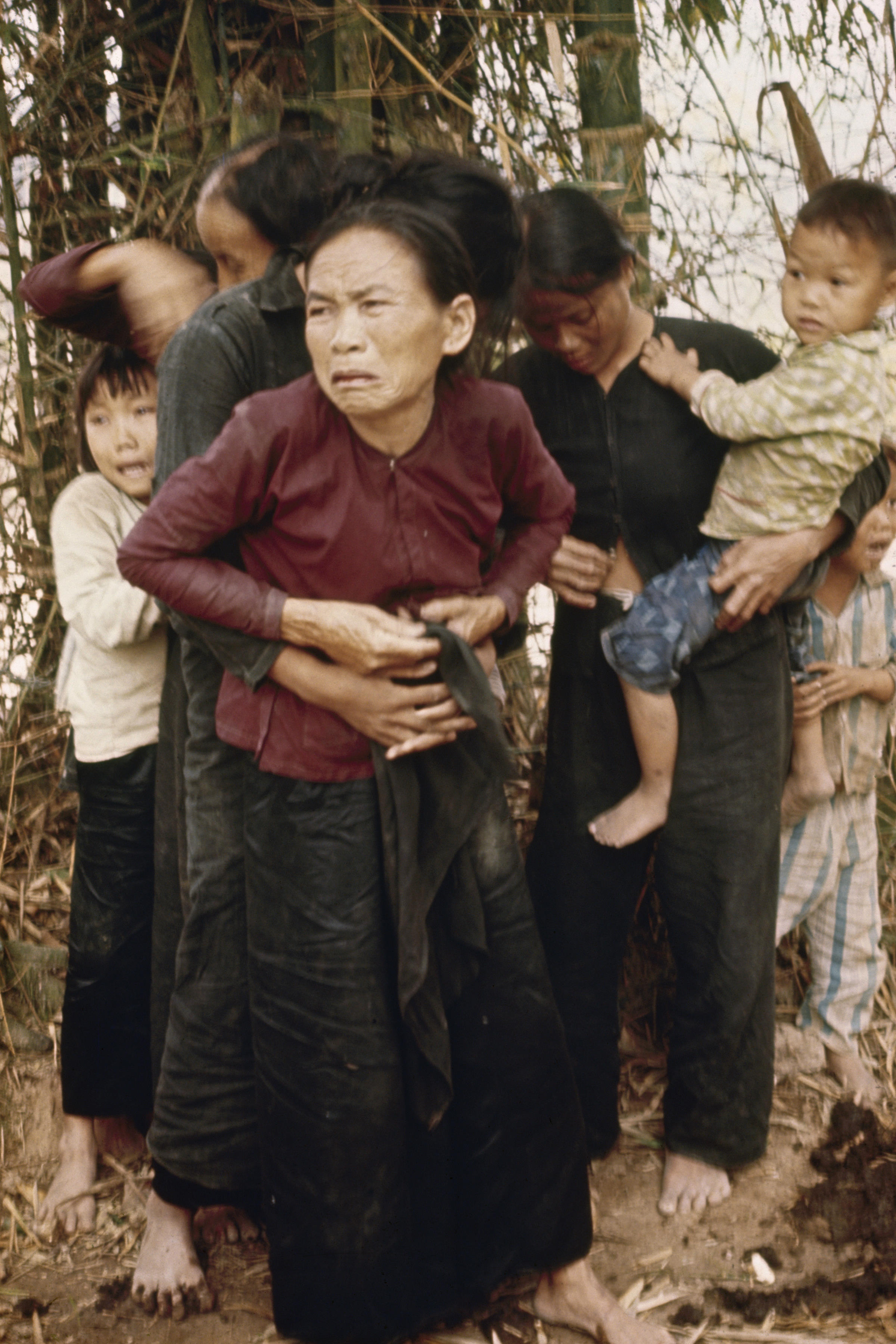
South Vietnamese women and children in Mỹ Lai before U.S. troops killed them in the massacre, March 16, 1968

German historian Bernd Greiner mentions the following atrocities reported and/or investigated by the Peers Commission and the Vietnam War Crimes Working Group, among other sources:

- Seven massacres officially confirmed by the American side. My Lai (4) and My Khe (4) (collectively the My Lai Massacre) claimed the largest number of victims with 420 and 90 respectively, and in five other places a total of about 100 civilians were executed.
- Two further massacres were reported by soldiers who had taken part in them, one north of Đức Pho in Quảng Ngãi Province in the summer of 1968 (14 victims), another in Bình Định Province on 20 July 1969 (25 victims).
- Tiger Force, a reconnaissance unit of the 101st Airborne Division, probably murdered hundreds of civilians during a 6-month period in 1967.

According to the Information Bureau of the Provisional Revolutionary Government of South Vietnam (PRG), a shadow government formed by North Vietnam in 1969, between April 1968 and the end of 1970 American ground troops killed about 6,500 civilians in the course of twenty-one operations either on their own or alongside their allies.

Nick Turse, in his 2013 book, Kill Anything that Moves, argues that a relentless drive toward higher body counts, a widespread use of free-fire zones, rules of engagement where civilians who ran from soldiers or helicopters could be viewed as VC, and a widespread disdain for Vietnamese civilians led to massive civilian casualties and endemic atrocities inflicted by U.S. troops. One example cited by Turse is Operation Speedy Express, an operation by the 9th Infantry Division, which was described by John Paul Vann as, in effect, "many My Lais".

Air force captain, Brian Wilson, who carried out bomb-damage assessments in free-fire zones throughout the delta, saw the results firsthand. "It was the epitome of immorality...One of the times I counted bodies after an air strike—which always ended with two napalm bombs which would just fry everything that was left—I counted sixty-two bodies. In my report I described them as so many women between fifteen and twenty-five and so many children—usually in their mothers' arms or very close to them—and so many old people." When he later read the official tally of dead, he found that it listed them as 130 VC killed.

=== Deaths caused by the South Korean military ===
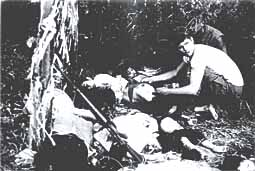
United States Marine recovers bodies of victims killed by South Korean Marines in Phong Nhi and Phong Nhat hamlets on February 12, 1968.

The ROK Capital Division reportedly perpetrated the Bình An/Tây Vinh massacre in February/March 1966. The 2nd Marine Brigade reportedly perpetrated the Binh Tai massacre on 9 October 1966. In December 1966, the Blue Dragon Brigade reportedly perpetrated the Bình Hòa massacre. The Second Marine Brigade perpetrated the Phong Nhị and Phong Nhất massacre on 12 February 1968. South Korean Marines reportedly perpetrated the Hà My massacre on 25 February 1968. According to a study conducted in 1968 by a Quaker-funded Vietnamese-speaking American couple, Diane and Michael Jones, there were at least 12 mass killings committed by South Korean forces that approached the scale of the My Lai Massacre, with reports of thousands of routine murders of civilians, primarily the elderly, women and children. A separate study was carried out by RAND Corporation employee Terry Rambo, who conducted interviews in 1970 on reported Korean atrocities in ARVN/civilian areas. Widespread reports of deliberate mass killings by Korean forces alleged that they were the result of systemic, deliberate policies to massacre civilians, with murders running into the hundreds. These policies were also reported on by US commanders, with one US Marine General stating "whenever the Korean marines received fire "or think [they got] fired on from a village ... they'd divert from their march and go over and completely level the village ... it would be a lesson to (the Vietnamese)." Another Marine commander, Gen. Robert E. Cushman Jr., added, "we had a big problem with atrocities attributed to them, which I sent on down to Saigon." Investigations by Korean civic groups have alleged that at least 9,000 civilians were massacred by ROK forces.

== Army of the Republic of Vietnam ==
The ARVN suffered 254,256 recorded combat deaths between 1960 and 1974, with the highest number of recorded deaths being in 1972, with 39,587 combat deaths. According to Guenter Lewy, the ARVN suffered between 171,331 and 220,357 deaths during the war.R. J. Rummel estimated that ARVN suffered between 219,000 and 313,000 deaths during the war, including in 1975 and prior to 1960.

Year	1960	1961	1962	1963	1964	1965	1966	1967	1968	1969	1970	1971	1972	1973	1974	Total (1960–1974)
ARVN combat deaths	2,223	4,004	4,457	5,665	7,457	11,242	11,953	12,716	27,915	21,833	23,346	22,738	39,587	27,901	31,219	254,256

Other casualties for the ARVN included up to 1,170,000 military wounded, and 1,000,000 surrendered or captured. Prior to the 1975 spring offensive, at least 5,336 ARVN were captured, being released in the aftermath of the Paris Peace Accords.

== North Vietnamese and Viet Cong military casualties ==
Deaths

According to the Vietnamese government's national survey and assessment of war casualties (March 2017), there were 849,018 PAVN military personnel dead, including combat death and non-combat death, from the period between 1960 and 1975. An additional 232,000 military personnel were still missing as of 2017, a total of 1,081,000 dead and missing for the American War. Based on unit surveys, a rough estimate of 30–40% of dead and missing were non-combat deaths. Across all three wars including the First Indochina War and the Third Indochina War there was a total of 1,146,250 PAVN/VC confirmed military deaths, included 939,460 with bodies recovered and 207,000 with the bodies unfound. Per war: 191,605 deaths in the First Indochina War, 849,018 deaths in the Second Indochina War (Vietnam War), and 105,627 deaths in the Third Indochina War.

According to American writer Joseph Babcock, the Vietnamese government estimated 300,000 PAVN/VC missing-in-action (MIA) in 2019, but that the real number of MIA is widely believed to be closer to 500,000 people, whose bodies were either never found or buried anonymously and never identified. The overwhelming majority of the MIA are from northern Vietnam. In 1976, the Vietnamese government organized Gathering Teams to find the remains of dead soldiers. The overwhelming majority of the MIA are from northern Vietnam. According to the Vietnamese government, from 1994 to 2012, 172,460 PAVN/VC bodies were found, including 15,989 in Cambodia, and 14,549 in Laos, and around 10,000 bodies were found from 2012 to 2015, reducing the number of MIA from 390,000 (1993) to 207,000 (2016). According to the Vice Minister Nguyễn Bá Hoan, in 2022, nearly 200,000 PAVN/VC were still MIA (whose bodies were have not been found), and 300,000 whose bodies have been found, but buried anonymously and never identified.

According to the Vietnamese government's official history, the PAVN suffered over 100,000 casualties during the 1972 Easter Offensive, including 40,000 killed. The U.S. estimated more than 100,000 PAVN killed in the offensive. After the U.S.'s withdrawal from the conflict, the Pentagon estimated PAVN/VC deaths at 39,000 in 1973 and 61,000 in 1974. Per the official Vietnamese history, over 10,000 more PAVN soldiers were killed in the final offensive of early 1975.

There has been considerable controversy about the exact numbers of deaths inflicted on the Communist side by U.S. and allied South Vietnamese forces. Shelby Stanton, writing in The Rise and Fall of an American Army, declined to include casualty statistics because of their "...general unreliability. Accurate assessments of North Vietnamese Army and Viet Cong losses were largely impossible due to lack of disclosure by the Vietnamese government, terrain, destruction of remains by firepower used." The "shameful gamesmanship practiced by 'certain reporting elements' under pressure to 'produce results'" also contributed to the unreliability of the statistics.

RJ Rummel estimates 1,011,000 PAVN/VC combatant deaths. The official US Department of Defense figure was 950,765 communist forces killed in Vietnam from 1965 to 1974. Defense Department officials believed that these body count figures need to be deflated by 30 percent. For this figure, Guenter Lewy assumes that one-third of the reported enemy killed may have been civilians, concluding that the actual number of deaths of the VC and PAVN military forces was probably closer to 444,000.

Author Mark Woodruff noted that when the Vietnamese Government finally revealed its estimated losses (in April 1995) as being 1.1 million dead or missing, U.S. body count figures had actually underestimated enemy losses.

The Phoenix Program, a counterinsurgency program executed by the CIA, some US forces, and the Republic of Vietnam's security apparatus, killed 26,369 suspected of being VC operatives and informants.

Historian Christian Appy states "search and destroy was the principal tactic; and the enemy body count was the primary measure of progress" in the US strategy of attrition. Search and destroy was a term to describe operations aimed at flushing the Viet Cong out of hiding, while body count was the measuring stick for operation success and this resulted in exaggeration and listing civilian deaths as enemy KIA. One study estimated that American commanders exaggerated body counts by up to 100 percent.

Other casualties

The PAVN/VC forces suffered around 600,000 wounded during the war, and prior to the 1975 spring offensive, lost at least 26,880 soldiers taken prisoner - being released after the 1973 Peace Accords. Additionally, according to the U.S. military, they also lost up to 101,511 personnel as defectors due to the Chieu Hoi program, but one analyst speculates that less than 25% of those were genuine.

== United States military ==
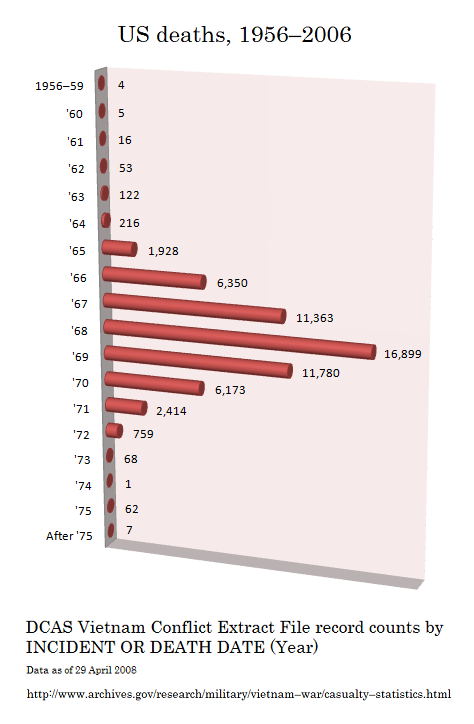
U.S. Vietnam War deaths

Casualties as of 4 May 2021:

- 58,281 Killed in action (KIA) or non-combat deaths (including the missing and deaths in captivity) [See note, below.]
- 153,372 Wounded in action (WIA) (excluding 150,332 persons not requiring hospital care)
- 1,582 Missing in action (MIA) (originally 2,646) (Note: Including 28 civilians, originally there were 52 missing civilians.)
- 835–837 POW (721 freed/escaped, (Note: One escapee died of wounds sustained during his rescue 15 days later.) 114–116 died in captivity)

Note: This figure differs by 61 from that which is given by the National Archive: "The Vietnam Conflict Extract Data File of the Defense Casualty Analysis System (DCAS) Extract Files contains records of 58,220 U.S. military fatal casualties of the Vietnam War." This comparatively small difference is based on the fact that the most recent death file transferred from the DCAS to the National Archive was dated 28 May 2006, compared with the VVMF's memorial entry of 4 May 2021.

The total number of American personnel who were KIA or died non-hostile deaths, were enlisted personnel with a casualty number of 50,441. The total number of officer casualties, commissioned and warrant, are 7,877. The following is a chart of all casualties, listed by ethnicity, and in descending order.

White	Black	Hispanic	Hawaiian/Pacific Islander	American Indian/ Alaska Native	Non-Hispanic (other ethnicity)	Asian
49,830	7,243	349	229	226	204	139

The total number of casualties, both KIA and non-hostile deaths, for drafted and volunteer service personnel (figures are approximated):

Volunteer	Draftees
70%	30%

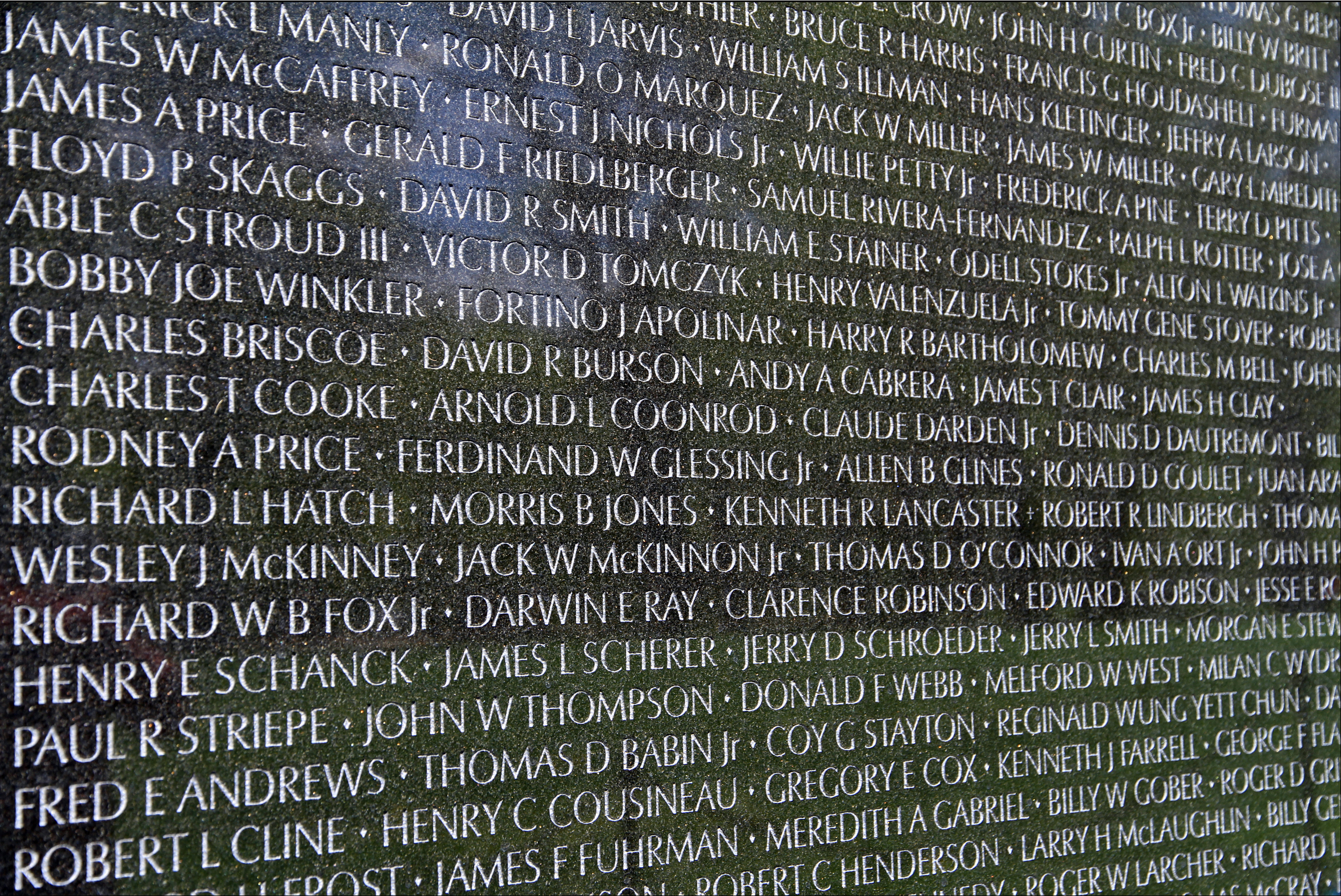
A small segment of the "Wall" at the Vietnam Veterans Memorial listing the names of the nearly 60,000 American war dead

During the Vietnam War, 30% of wounded service members died of their wounds. Around 30–35% of American deaths in the war were non-combat or friendly fire deaths; the largest causes of death in the U.S. armed forces were small arms fire (31.8%), booby traps including mines and frags (27.4%), and aircraft crashes (14.7%).

=== Vietnam War casualties by state and territory ===
This table lists those who died during the Vietnam War by state or territory.

State	Casualties
Alabama	1,208
Alaska	57
American Samoa	4
Arizona	619
Arkansas	592
California	5,575
Colorado	623
Connecticut	612
Delaware	122
Florida	1,954
Georgia	1,581
Guam	70
Hawaii	276
Idaho	217
Illinois	2,936
Indiana	1,534
Iowa	851
Kansas	627
Kentucky	1,056
Louisiana	885
Maine	341
Maryland	1,014
Massachusetts	1,331
Michigan	2,657
Minnesota	1,077
Mississippi	636
Missouri	1,418
Montana	267
Nebraska	396
Nevada	149
New Hampshire	226
New Jersey	1,487
New Mexico	395
New York	4,119
North Carolina	1,613
North Dakota	199
Northern Mariana Islands	NA
Ohio	3,094
Oklahoma	987
Oregon	710
Panama Canal Zone	2
Pennsylvania	3,147
Puerto Rico	345
Rhode Island	209
South Carolina	895
South Dakota	192
Tennessee	1,295
Texas	3,415
Utah	361
Vermont	100
Virgin Islands	15
Virginia	1,305
Washington	1,047
West Virginia	733
Wisconsin	1,161
Wyoming	119
Washington, D.C.	242
Total	58,098

=== African American casualties ===
African Americans suffered disproportionately high casualty rates during the Vietnam War. In 1965, despite comprising only 11% of the total U.S. population, African Americans constituted 14.1% of combat deaths in Vietnam. With the draft increasing due to the troop buildup in South Vietnam, the military significantly lowered its admission standards. In October 1966, Defense Secretary Robert McNamara initiated Project 100,000 which further lowered military standards for 100,000 additional draftees per year. McNamara claimed this program would provide valuable training, skills and opportunity to America's poor—a promise that was never carried out. Many black men who had previously been ineligible could now be drafted, along with many poor and racially intolerant white men from the southern states. This led to increased racial tension in the military.

The number of US military personnel in Vietnam jumped from 23,300 in 1965 to 465,600 by the end of 1967. Between October 1966 and June 1969, 246,000 soldiers were recruited through Project 100,000, of whom 41% were black; black people only made up about 11% of the population of the US. Of the 27 million draft-age men between 1964 and 1973, 40% were drafted into military service, and only 10% were actually sent to Vietnam. This group was made up almost entirely of either working-class or rural youth. Black people often made up a disproportionate 25% or more of combat units, while constituting only 12% of the military. 20% of black males were combat soldiers, sailors, airmen and marines.

Civil rights leaders, including Martin Luther King Jr., Malcolm X, John Lewis, Muhammad Ali and others, criticized the racial disparity in both casualties and representation in the entire military, prompting the Pentagon to order cutbacks in the number of African Americans in combat positions. Commander George L. Jackson said, "In response to this criticism, the Department of Defense took steps to readjust force levels in order to achieve an equitable proportion and employment of Negroes in Vietnam." The Army instigated myriad reforms, addressed issues of discrimination and prejudice from the post exchanges to the lack of black officers, and introduced "Mandatory Watch And Action Committees" into each unit. This resulted in a dramatic decrease in the proportion of black casualties, and by late 1967, black casualties had fallen to 13%, and were below 10% in 1970 to 1972. As a result, by the war's completion, total black casualties averaged 12.5% of US combat deaths, approximately equal to percentage of draft-eligible black men, though still slightly higher than the 10% who served in the military.

== Aftermath ==
Unexploded ordnance continue to detonate and kill people today. According to the Vietnamese government, unexploded ordnance has killed some 42,000 people since the end of the war. According to a 2009 study, one third of land in the central provinces of Vietnam is still contaminated with unexploded mines and ordnance. In 2012 alone, unexploded ordnance had claimed 500 casualties in Vietnam, Laos and Cambodia, according to activists and Vietnamese government databases. The United States has spent over $65 million since 1998 as part of unexploded ordnance clearing operations.

Agent Orange and similar chemical defoliants have also caused a considerable number of deaths and injuries over the years, including among the US Air Force crew that handled them. The government of Vietnam says that 4 million of its citizens were exposed to Agent Orange, and as many as 3 million have suffered illnesses because of it; these figures include the children of people who were exposed. The Red Cross of Vietnam estimates that up to 1 million people are disabled or suffer health problems due to Agent Orange exposure.

On 9 August 2012, the United States and Vietnam began a cooperative cleaning up of the toxic chemical from part of Da Nang International Airport, marking the first time Washington has been involved in cleaning up Agent Orange in Vietnam. Da Nang was the primary storage site of the chemical. Two other cleanup sites being reviewed by the United States and Vietnam are Biên Hòa Air Base, in the southern province of Đồng Nai—a 'hotspot' for dioxin—and Phù Cát Air Base in Bình Định Province, according to U.S. Ambassador to Vietnam David Shear. The Vietnamese newspaper Nhân Dân reported in 2012 that the U.S. government was providing $41 million to the project, which aimed to reduce the contamination level in 73,000 m^{3} of soil by late 2016.

Following the end of the war, many refugees fled Vietnam by boat and ship. The number of these "boat people" leaving Vietnam and arriving safely in another country totalled almost 800,000 between 1975 and 1995. Many of the refugees failed to survive the passage, facing danger from pirates, over-crowded boats, and storms. According to the United Nations High Commission for Refugees, between 200,000 and 400,000 boat people died at sea. The boat people's first destinations were the Southeast Asian locations of Hong Kong, Indonesia, Malaysia, Philippines, Singapore, and Thailand. From refugee camps in Southeast Asia, the great majority of boat people were resettled in more developed countries. Significant numbers resettled in the United States, Canada, Italy, Australia, France, West Germany, and the United Kingdom.

== Other nations' casualties ==
Cambodian Civil War

- 275,000–310,000 killed

Laotian Civil War

- 20,000–62,000 killed

=== Military ===
South Korea

- 5,099 killed in action
- 11,232 wounded
- 4 missing in action

Australia

- 526 killed (inc. 2 in Thailand; 426 killed in action, 74 non-combat)
- 3,129 wounded, injured or ill

Thailand

- 351 killed in action
- 1,358 wounded
- 200+ captured

New Zealand

- 37 killed in action
- 187 wounded

Republic of China (Taiwan)

- 25 killed in action
- 17 captured

Philippines

- 9 killed in action
- 64 wounded

People's Republic of China

- 1,446 killed in action

Soviet Union

- ~16 deaths (4 killed in action)

North Korea

- ~14 pilots killed

=== Civilian ===
Australia

- 7 killed

New Zealand

- 2 killed
