= South Korea in the Vietnam War =

South Korean involvement in the Vietnam War
- Part of the Vietnam War
- Type: War
- Location: South Vietnam
- Objective: To support South Vietnam against Communist attacks
- Date: 11 September 1964 – 23 March 1973
- Executed by: Approximately 320,000 military personnel, with an average of 48,000 per year.
- Casualties: 5,099 killed 10,962 injured

South Korea, which was at the time a semi-presidential republic under its right-wing president Park Chung Hee, took a major active role in the Vietnam War. The Korean War just a decade prior was still fresh on the minds of the South Korean people, and the threat from North Korea was still very real. South Korea's decision to join resulted from various underlying causes. This included the climate of the Cold War, to further develop of South Korea–United States relations for economic and military support and political exigencies like anti-communism. Under the wartime alliance, the South Korean economy flourished, receiving tens of billions of dollars in grants, loans, subsidies, technology transfers, and preferential economic treatment.

From September 1964 to March 1973, South Korea sent some 350,000 troops to South Vietnam. The South Korean Army, Marine Corps, Navy, and Air Force all participated as an ally of the United States. The number of troops from South Korea was much greater than those from Australia and New Zealand, and second only to the U.S. military force for foreign troops located in South Vietnam. The military commander was Lieutenant general Chae Myung-shin of the South Korean army. Participation of South Korean forces in the war included both non-combatant and combatant roles. Its role was also not without controversy, with South Korean forces having committed numerous war crimes in Vietnam, issues that still affect contemporary South Korea–Vietnam relations due to South Korea's indifferent stance.

== Causes ==
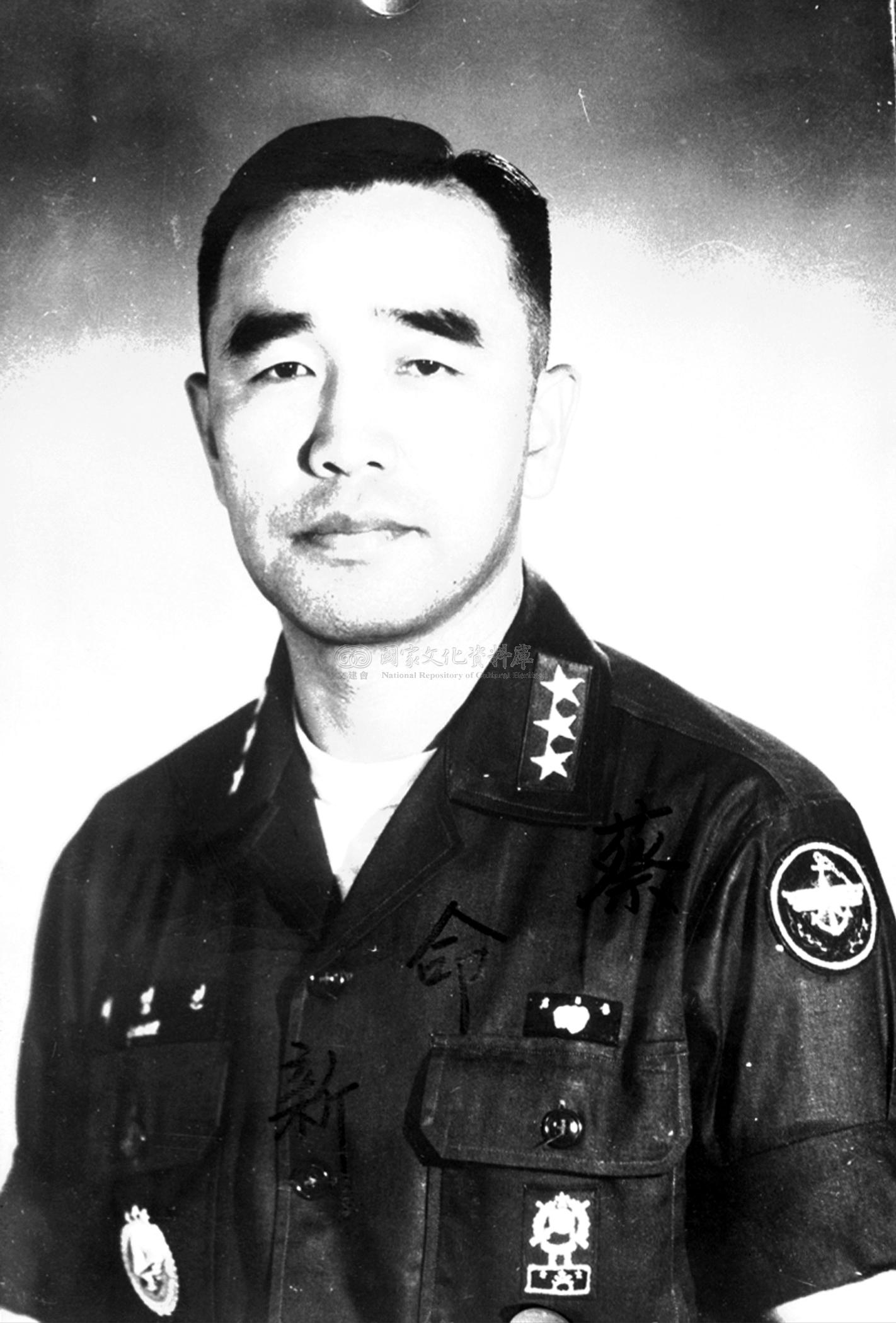
General Chae Myung-shin, the commander of South Korean forces in Vietnam

Although the South Korean military was first dispatched to Vietnam during the Park Chung Hee administration, the discussions to send troops to Vietnam already started in the Syngman Rhee era, when France fought against Vietnamese forces in the First Indochina War. Syngman Rhee originally offered to send troops to South Vietnam in 1954 because he was concerned about the redeployment of American troops from Korea to Vietnam, which reduced their defenses against the threat of North Korean aggression. With a South Korean military presence in Vietnam, Rhee surmised that he could demand a larger American military presence in South Korea in return. At that time, his proposal to dispatch the South Korean military was declined both by France and the US; however, the agenda was back on the table at the first meeting of Park and John F. Kennedy in Washington, D.C. during November of 1961.

When Park Chung Hee became the President of South Korea, he continued Rhee's policy, seeing the Vietnam War as an opportunity to further the alliance with the United States and receive economic aid, domestic help, modern military equipment, and other potential benefits. Out of all of the countries that agreed to send troops to Vietnam, South Korea was the poorest. Park saw South Korea's participation in the war as a way to receive American dollars — valuable currency that was used to kick-start the country's industrial development. South Korea also saw how American economic power helped Japan in its economic recovery during the destructive Korean War, and saw the same opportunity for South Korea's development during the Vietnamese war.

In 1965 Lyndon Johnson administration requested twenty five countries to participate in the Vietnam War, and seven countries accepted it. As far as South Korea was concerned President Lyndon Johnson made a formal request for noncombatant troops on May 1, 1964. President Dwight D. Eisenhower rejected the previous offers because American public opinion would not support an American military presence in South Korea if the South Korean troops were fighting in Vietnam. President John F. Kennedy rejected the previous offers because he hoped that the situation in Vietnam would not deteriorate to the point that South Korean troops were needed. President Johnson, in comparison, was frustrated by the lack of international support for the war, and desperate for foreign forces. The Johnson administration requested for foreign mercenary troops, and South Korea responded and quickly sent the first deployment of South Korean troops, which were made from the groups of Taekwondo instructors and medical corps, in 1964.

== Role ==
Depended documents referred the time and the place the first South Korean units arrived at South Vietnam vary. The report by Stanley Larsen and James Collins Jr describes that the first units arrived in February 1965, in a brigade group known as Dove Force but there is also a book they were sent on January in the same year. These included engineers, a medical unit, military police, a navy LST, liaison staff, and other support personnel. Dove Force was deployed to the Biên Hòa region of South Vietnam, and helped build schools, roads and bridges. Medical teams are reported to have treated over 30,000 South Vietnamese civilians. The civilian operations in the early southern part of the campaign are reported to have had some success. At this time two thousand soldiers of the advance troops were dispatched and reached 50,000 finally within this year. In addition to combat and non-combat forces, South Korea had sent around 100,000 civilian workers to South Vietnam, employed in technical and civilian tasks. On the other hand, the Korean book by 金賢娥 writes that the first South Korean troops were sent in October 1965. According to it Blue Dragon Division and Fierce Tiger Division landed on Vũng Tàu after the South Korean national assembly approved the dispatch unanimously.

Under the assembly's approval South Korean troops were sent totally four times after it. The second dispatch was in April 1966 and the third in September of the same year and at the times 26th regiment in Fierce Tiger Division and White Horse Division were sent. In 1966 the sent soldiers amounted to 45,000 besides 5,000 military engineering and medical corps were added.

In 1966 Korean combat forces were deployed to the Tuy Hòa valley and taking over security operations, where there was some positive evaluations of ROK's operational capability. They are alleged to have had a casualty ratio of 24 to 1 during one operation in 1966.

At the start of the Tet Offensive they were transferred to the Da Nang and Quảng Nam Province region.

State Department reports state that though they were seen as effective in combat in the initial years, they had later withdrawn to the coast and were reluctant to undertake offensive operations. A passive role was not limited to just the Koreans; other armies including ANZAC and US forces were also kept at minimal combat following the Tet Offensive. Part of the reason for this was the US announcement of withdrawal following political failures revealed by Tet, which caused the Korean military to lose motivational commitment, the Korean military's assessment received favourable reviews in the beginning and was passive in the second half. The withdrawal process had negatively impacted Korean-US relations, despite economic benefits gained, with Nixon and Secretary of Defense Melvin Laird considering simultaneous withdrawal from both Korea and Vietnam.

In 1969 the South Korean army accounted for 9% of the foreign troops stationed in South Vietnam (US Army 475,200, ROK Army 49,755); by the end of 1972, they comprised 60.5% of foreign troops (US Army 24,200, ROK Army 37,438). US Marine Aviation assets that supported the 2nd Marine Brigade withdrew completely in May 1971 while the combat role of Korean troops continued. As Vietnamization progressed the U.S., had to consider keeping support units in South Vietnam to support the two ROK Divisions. Around the time of the Battle of An Khe Pass, ROK forces had more limited air-support, but remained until 1973 when all foreign troops withdrew due to the Paris Peace Accords. The U.S. considered convincing the South Korean government to keep one of the divisions in South Vietnam into 1974 given the slow progress of development of Army of the Republic of Vietnam (ARVN) units in the area.

== Evaluation ==
American war planners are alleged to have leaned on ROK forces, given their ability to carry out missions with considerable success, some claiming Koreans outperformed other allied forces in Vietnam in terms of lethality and organization. Other commanders whom interacted with them were more critical and stated "Koreans made excessive demands for choppers and artillery support and that they stood down for too long after an operation. He equated the total two Korean divisions to "what one can expect from one good US Brigade".

Secretary of Defense Melvin Laird publicly and openly questioned their usefulness in the conflict and had notable conflict with Korean leaders during the US Withdrawal period, questioning their use in the conflict and threatening to withdraw funding for them. Some reports state that ARVN forces were instead effectively buffering Korean forces from the PAVN and providing actual security of most areas. Other reports indicate civilians often left the Korean occupied areas. and that areas Korean forces operated in experienced significant unrest and strengthening of Vietcong control. According to one Korean author, claims about alleged Korean success caused the Viet Cong to avoid engagements with South Korean forces.

As a component of the joint-service MACV, the South Korean marines had a great deal of interaction with American Marines. The Vietnam War constituted the first military action on foreign soil for the South Korean marines since their formation. All of the 2nd Marine Brigade's officers were trained in Quantico, Virginia or San Diego, California by the U.S. Marine Corps.

Overall, assessments of the ROK military vary greatly over time. The tactics of the ROK military changed to defensive and passive tactics including the establishment of siege-like bases, unlike aggressive tactics prior to the Tet Offensive. This passivity became even worse since the US 7th Division withdrew from South Korea. Since one of the reasons for participation was due to fears of US withdrawal from South Korea, when the United States was planning on reducing the number of US troops on the Korean Peninsula later on, public opinion and government opinion declined, and they became less willing to participate. Other U.S. data generally positively assess the military activities of the Korean military.

Non-combat and civilian support operation included medical, antimalarial and surgery aid which also benefitted South Korea's public health knowledge. During the Vietnam War, the South Korean military provided 3,353,364 public health services, 1,640 tons of food, 461,764 points of clothing, 6,406 farm tools, and 3,319 bridges This hearts and minds campaign received positive reporting.

South Koreans tried to support the cooperative civilians around the base, but the civilians in the town where Viet Cong was active were seen by Koreans as enemies, not civilians. This was particularly noticeable in the northern areas where the Vietcong was very active. In other cases the Korean military and in particular engineering, medical and construction units put a great deal of effort into helping the people.

== Impact within South Korea ==
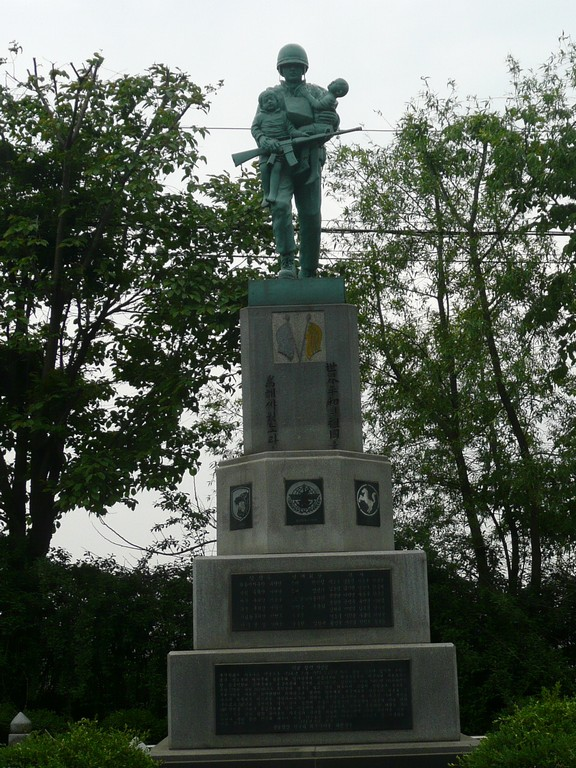
Memorial commemorating South Korean forces in the war

In return for deploying South Korean combat troops in Vietnam, the U.S. paid for the financial costs associated with South Korean troops in Vietnam; promised not to withdraw American troops from South Korea without prior consultation with the South Korean government; helped modernize the South Korean army; provided substantial military aid to South Korea; and gave economic aid to South Korea, including a $150 million development loan. The average salary for Korean servicemen in Vietnam was $37.50 per month, higher than the base pay of $1.60 per month back home although much of it was taken by the South Korean government. Over the nine-year period of South Korean troop commitments to Vietnam, 40% of the country's overall export earnings during this period came from the money combat personnel were paid, making an average of $200 million each year. The economic aid South Korea received from the U.S. was used to fund South Korea's industrialization efforts. For some of South Korea's largest conglomerates, they can attribute their subsequent success and growth to the lucrative business contracts awarded to them by the U.S. military. The total cost to the United States of paying for Korean participation was "peanuts compared to what it would be for a comparable number of Americans," but those payments are estimated to account for 4 percent of the GNP in 1967 and totalling more than one billion dollars. Under the wartime alliance, the South Korean economy flourished, receiving tens of billions of dollars in grants, loans, subsidies, technology transfers, and preferential economic treatment from America.

Some Korean soldiers saw themselves as repaying the sacrifices Americans had made during the Korean War. Others saw it as an economic opportunity for combat pay and took on service to support their families.

The wartime alliance between the U.S. and South Korea stabilized Park Chung Hee's regime, creating both short- and long-term effects for South Korea. South Korea's economic success deterred the appeal and threat of communism domestically, furthering the stability of Park's rule. Park took advantage of the alliance and used it to implement authoritarian policies in South Korea. He arrested his opposition, implemented martial law, and amended the constitution to allow himself to serve a third presidential term, bolstering the power of his regime. The U.S. tolerated his undemocratic policies to ensure the stability of South Korea.

Because of the alliances the U.S. had with South Korea and Japan, the U.S. played an important role in normalizing relations between South Korea and Japan, which brought long-lasting economic benefits to South Korea, receiving financial support from Japan and access to the Japanese economy. An example is the establishment of POSCO steel mill.

The Korean government refused to provide additional compensation for their war veterans by establishing a "no duplicate reward" in the Constitution. Korean victims of Agent Orange have also not received compensation from the Korean government.

There are allegations of missing POWs from Korea. A total of 320,000 troops were deployed, but only eight people have been officially recognized by the Korean government so far as missing in action. There are suspicions that the South Korean government intentionally ignored South Korean POWs captured by the North Vietnamese. It was believed that some of them were forcibly sent to North Korea, with the South Korean government concluding that at least two captured soldiers had been moved there, being forced to deliver speeches on North Korean Radio.

== South Korean war crimes ==
Because of their fierce attacks, the National Liberation Front of South Vietnam (NLF) feared the dispatched South Korean forces and atrocities conducted by the latter are in effect crueler than by South Vietnamese forces and by US troops, which were sporadically reported by international magazines, say, Time, during the Vietnam War. Nevertheless, the facts were shut out because of censorship in South Korea during the Park Chung Hee era and it was not until in 1999 that South Koreans knew the brutality in detail. Strictly speaking, the atrocities have not been concealed fully but ex-soldiers serving the Vietnam War had been talking about them rather openly as brave exploits or patriotic actions, they were, nevertheless, not considered as war crimes in South Korea for many years.

After the first detailed Korean article about the war crimes was published in 1999, which is explained later, various civilian groups have accused the South Korean military of war crimes, while the Korean Ministry of Defense has denied all such accusations.

Korean forces are alleged to have perpetrated the Binh Tai, Bình An/Tây Vinh, Bình Hòa, and Hà My massacres. Further incidents are alleged to have occurred in the villages of An Linh and Vinh Xuan in Phú Yên Province.

In 1972, Vietnamese-speaking American Friends Service Committee members Diane and Michael Jones looked at where Korean forces operated in Quảng Ngãi and Quảng Nam provinces and alleged they had conducted 45 massacres, including 13 in which over 20 unarmed civilians were purportedly killed. The Phong Nhị and Phong Nhất massacre is confirmed to have taken place within these two provinces. A separate refugee study by RAND authored by Terry Rambo, reported in a 1970 New York Times story, conducted interviews in early to mid 1966 in Phu Yen Province which confirmed that widespread war crimes had occurred. These included systemic mass-killings and deliberate policies to massacre civilians, with murders running into the hundreds.

War crimes by Korean forces were covered by Edward S. Herman and Noam Chomsky in Counter-Revolutionary Violence: Bloodbaths in Fact & Propaganda in the chapter "The 43+ My Lais of South Korean Mercenaries". They reported thousands of routine murders of primarily elderly, women, and children civilians as most men in these regions had been conscripted into the Viet Cong or the ARVN. Chomsky has raised allegations that U.S. leadership did not discourage Korean atrocities, but tolerated them.

The Associated Press (AP) in April 2000 investigated the purported Bình An/Tây Vinh massacre and stated that it "was unable to independently confirm their [the Vietnamese victims'] claims" and "an additional 653 civilians were allegedly killed the same year by South Korean troops in neighboring Quang Ngai and Phu Yen provinces, according to provincial and local officials interviewed by the AP on a trip the government took two months to approve. As is routine with foreign reporters, several government escorts accompanied the AP staff. The AP was unable to search for documents that would back up the officials' allegations". The AP wrote that "neither the Pentagon nor the South Korean Defense Ministry would comment on the allegations or offer independent confirmation". A Reuters story from January 2000 stated that:

Three local officials, including one who said he survived the alleged killings, spoke at length about the events in Binh Dinh. The officials, who declined to be identified, said that in early 1966, Korean troops entered what was then the Binh An commune, a collection of villages within Tay Son district that they believed was a Viet Cong stronghold. The Koreans were intent on flushing out opposing forces, but civilians bore the brunt of their actions, the officials said. An official at Tay Son's Communist Party history unit said the attacks began in early 1966 and culminated in a massacre of 380 people on Feb. 26, 1966, at a place called Go Dai" and that "a People's Committee official in Tay Son district also confirmed the details, saying 1,200 people were killed. A government official in Hanoi said central authorities had later investigated what happened at Binh Dinh and compiled detailed reports, which showed more than 1,000 people were killed during the period, about 380 of them at Go Dai. However, when asked for comment and to confirm the alleged killings, Vietnam's foreign ministry said it did not want to dwell on the matter."

"South Korean troops committed crimes against Vietnamese people. With humanitarian and peaceful neighbourly traditions, it is Vietnam's policy to close the past..." the ministry said in a statement in response to questions.

When Korean forces were deployed to I Corps in 1968, U.S. Marine General Rathvon M. Tompkins stated that "whenever the Korean Marines received fire or think [they got] fired on from a village... they'd divert from their march and go over and completely level the village. It would be a lesson to [the Vietnamese]". General Robert E. Cushman Jr. stated several years later that "we had a big problem with atrocities committed by them which I sent down to Saigon." presumably in reference to the Phong Nhị and Phong Nhất massacre.

Koreans have claimed that war crimes committed by their forces stemmed from orders by Park Chung Hee to minimise casualties through practices such as hostage-taking. Furthermore, the brutality of the South Koreans was due to many officers being Japanese-trained and implementing the same doctrines used during the Korean War.

Punishment for some war crimes did occur. The Korean Army responded to the case of General Seo Kyung-seok, decorated for winning a victory but found to have beaten a prisoner, by revoking his award.

The first Korean report of the war crimes by the South Korean troops appeared in the 9 May 1999 issue of Hankyoreh 21, the weekly magazine published by the Hankyoreh, which was written by Ku Su-jeong (具秀姃). At that time she was a Korean master student of Ho Chi Minh City National University and was studying Vietnamese modern history. Her article shocked Korean society. After the issue Hankyoreh 21 continued to publish a series of articles to bring the crimes to light for a year. These reports came just as the newly democratized South Korea was facing pressures from civic groups to recognize the mass killings of South Korean civilians by ROK forces during the Korean War such as the Bodo League massacres. In the first article Ku classified the massacres as follows:

- civilians, most of them were women, children and elderly, were collected in one place to be eradicated by machine guns
- citizens were pushed in a house and the soldiers fired them wildly. After it they set fire to kill even though they were still alive.
- the soldiers smashed heads of children, cut their necks and mutilated. After it they were thrown into fire.
- the soldiers raped women to kill
- the soldiers crushed stomachs of pregnant women underfoot with combat boots until their bellies were broken for the fetuses to appear.
- citizens were pushed in a cellar of a village to be killed with poison gas

Further testimonies and extensive accounts in the South Korean media emerged from South Korean Vietnam War veterans, and have caused considerable debate and re-assessment within South Korea about its role in the conflict. Korean civil groups have discussed the issue considerably, and calls have been made for a Korean inquiry, in line with the Truth and Reconciliation Commission on massacres committed by government forces during the Korean War, known as the People's Tribunal on War Crimes by South Korean Troops during the Vietnam War.

South Korean civic groups have created a statue on Jeju Island dedicated to Vietnam War victims at a site commemorating victims of the Jeju uprising.

== Impact on South Korea and Vietnam relations ==
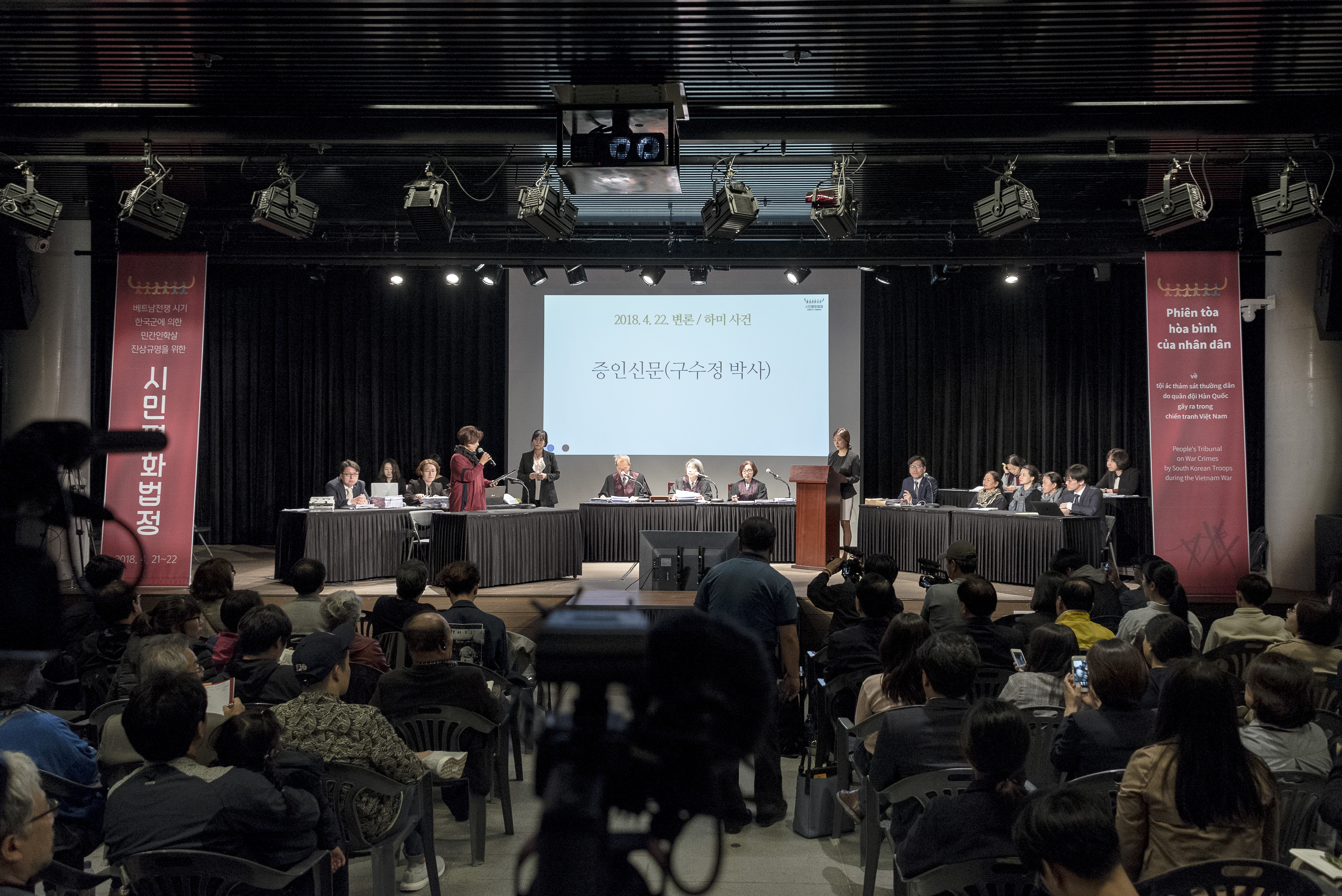
People's Tribunal on War Crimes by South Korean Troops during the Vietnam War held by Minbyun and the Korea-Vietnam Peace Foundation.

The issue of war crimes has not been an aspect of foreign relations between the governments of Korea and Vietnam both when the countries were opening up relations and to the present day, unlike the role historical issues have played in Korean-Japanese relations. Much of this issue is instead driven by civic groups in both countries. In April 2020, a survivor of the Phong Nhi massacre alongside the Korea-Vietnam Peace Foundation filed a civil lawsuit in the court of South Korea against the Korean government in an effort to have a fact-finding mission convened. The Korean Defense Ministry in its response has stated that its own records do not support allegations of the lawsuit, and has called for a joint investigation by the Korean and Vietnamese governments. Survivors of the Phong Nhi massacre have also traveled to South Korea to give accounts of events to various groups.

Apologetic statements from President Kim Dae-jung and Moon Jae-in have been given, short of a full public apology. Apologies for war crimes has become a political issue within South Korean politics, as President Moon Jae-in had planned on making a unilateral official apology but stopped short due to widespread opposition from prominent conservatives within South Korea. The recent political interest in South Korea for an official apology is sometimes compared with diplomatic rifts between Japan and Korea due to a South Korean court awarding compensation for forced labor from a Japanese company.

The issue is rarely acknowledged or discussed by the Vietnamese government or state-controlled media following normalization of relations, though in a rare statement the Vietnamese government did oppose the "commemoration of mercenaries" when South Korean President Moon Jae-in honoured the 50th anniversary of South Korean servicemen who had fought in South Vietnam on South Korea's Memorial Day in 2017.

The issue around children conceived through wartime affairs and rape known as Lai Đại Hàn remains, similar to the controversies around comfort women. Civic groups in Vietnam have campaigned for recognition of the issue and an apology by the Korean government. Most were ostracised and neglected by Vietnamese society following the war. Lai Đại Hàn and their families faced mistreatment following North Vietnam's victory for allegedly siding with opposing forces, including one rape victim's father being beaten to death by the communist regime shortly after the war ended. Both the Korean and Vietnamese governments have sidelined or ignored this issue, and requests by the BBC to produce a documentary on it was turned down by the Vietnamese government.

== Order of battle ==
- Capital Division (Fierce Tiger)
- 9th Infantry Division (White Horse)
  - 1st Airborne Special Forces Group - 12 teams are each attached to the Capital Mechanized Infantry Division and 9th Infantry Division
- 2nd Marine Brigade (Blue Dragon)
- Navy Transportation Flotilla (White Sea Gull)
  - UDT - attached to ROK Navy Transportation Flotilla
- Air Force Support Group (Silver Horse)

== Battles and operations involving South Korea ==
- Operation Van Buren
- Operation Masher
- Operation Crazy Horse
- Battle of Đức Cơ
- Operation Geronimo
- Operation Pershing
- Operation Hong Kil Dong
- Operation Hood River
- Operation Imperial Lake
- Operation Dragon Fire
- Operation Thayer
- Battle of Trà Bình
- Tet offensive attacks on Đà Nẵng
- Operation Pipestone Canyon

== Media ==
In 1992, Korean film director Chung Ji-young directed a War film titled White Badge. It follows two veterans who fought in the Vietnam War and had seen the horrors of war through a series of flashbacks. 2004 horror war film R-Point depicts a squad of eight soldiers tasked with extracting a missing platoon that was sent to R-Point in an abandoned French plantation, only to find out that the building is being haunted by the spirits of the deceased. In 2008, Lee Joon-ik produced a drama war film titled Sunny which follows a young woman who joins a band in order to find her husband who is sent off fighting in Vietnam. The 2020 TV drama It's Okay to Not Be Okay depicts a veteran named Gan Pil-ong suffering from PTSD. He expresses remorse for obeying orders to massacre Vietnamese children.

== See also ==
- MACV
- Republic of China in the Vietnam War
- New Zealand in the Vietnam War
- Military history of Australia during the Vietnam War
- Canada and the Vietnam War
- North Korean involvement in the Russian invasion of Ukraine
