= Bình Tai massacre =

1966 purported killing of civilians by South Korean forces in South Vietnam

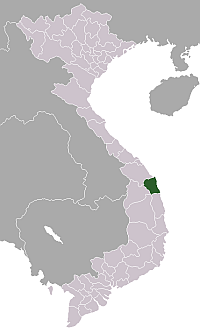
- Quảng Ngãi Province
- Location: Bình Tai village, South Vietnam
- Date: October 9, 1966; 60 years ago
- Target: Bình Tai villagers
- Attack type: Massacre
- Deaths: 29–168
- Perpetrator: South Korean Forces

The Bình Tai Massacre was a massacre allegedly perpetrated by South Korean forces on 9 October 1966 of 29–168 civilians in Bình Tai village of Bình Định Province in South Vietnam.

== Investigation ==
The South Korean newspaper, The Hankyoreh, investigated war crimes in Vietnam and this massacre had first came to light from a testimony by an officer whom had overseen the killing. Colonel Kim Ki-tae, former commander of the Seventh Company, 2nd Marine Division, testified in The Hankyoreh on 9 October 1966 about the event. Colonel Kim had reported he oversaw the murder of 29 men who were 'probably just farmers' alongside other civilians, and confirmed by the Hankyoreh's onsite investigation of events. South Korean troops set fire to the villagers' homes and shot the villagers who fled the burning buildings. The raid had been ordered as a punitive action by the Division Headquarters as retaliation for the killing of a ROKA Infantry Soryeong (Major) and a ROK Marine Artillery Jungsa (First Sergeant) three days before by sniper fire. The testimony by Colonel Kim had prompted other Korean veterans to testify about mass-killings. The massacre was discussed by the People's Tribunal on War Crimes by South Korean Troops during the Vietnam War in 2018.

== See also ==
- Military history of South Korea during the Vietnam War
- Phong Nhị and Phong Nhất massacre
- Hà My massacre
- My Lai massacre
- Bình Hòa massacre
- War Remnants Museum
