= Operation Hong Kil Dong =

Part of the Vietnam War (1967)

- Part of the Vietnam War
Date	9 July – 26 August 1967
Location	Near Tuy Hòa, Phú Yên Province, South Vietnam 13°10′N 108°55′E
Result	South Korean victory

Belligerents
South Korea	North Vietnam; Viet Cong

Commanders and leaders
(South Korea) Lt. Gen.Chae Myung Shin	Unknown

Units involved
Capital Division; 9th Infantry Division	5th Division; 85th Regiment; 95th Regiment

Casualties and losses
27 killed	638 killed 88 captured 359 individual and 98 crew-served weapons recovered

Operation Hong Kil Dong (홍길동작전) was the largest South Korean operation of the Vietnam War. The 48-day-long operation was claimed by South Korea as a major success as they claimed to have thwarted People's Army of Vietnam (PAVN)/Viet Cong (VC) infiltration into friendly areas. The results of the operation were a claim of a kill ratio of 24:1 in the Korean's report primarily killed by heavy artillery, aerial bombardment and B-52 Arclight strikes with 638 PAVN/VC. 98 crew-served and 359 individual weapons were found in the aftermath.

== Prelude ==
In June 1967, a rested and refitted PAVN 95th Regiment, 5th Division left its base area for the coast, attacking South Vietnamese and Korean forces not far from Tuy Hòa in Phu Yen province. The 95th Regiment's traditional redoubt was an area known as the "Hub", northwest of Tuy Hoa. In November 1966 US areas had attacked the area in Operation Geronimo with good results.

== Operation ==
Lieutenant general Chae Myung Shin vacillated before deciding to strike back. Leaving some 60% of his forces on the plains for security, the operation began on 9 July when four battalions of the Capital Division deployed south of Dong Tre to attack southeast, and three battalions of 9th Division staged at Cung Son to assault northeast. While the Korean troops moved out, B-52s blanketed the target, and two battalions from the Army of the Republic of Vietnam 47th Regiment, 22nd Division, manned blocking positions to the east, on the fringes of the populated coast. On the first day the Koreans encountered a few of the enemy, but resistance was slight and easily handled. Pressing forward methodically, no more than one or two kilometers a day, the Koreans trapped several enemy companies in small base camps and caves, claiming over 500 PAVN dead by 25 July. All seven battalions then swept east through the Hub, meeting strong resistance at first and then almost nothing in the two weeks that followed. The first phase of the offensive end ed with the troops eliminating bypassed pockets of PAVN.

On 12 August the second phase began with the two divisions conducting separate offensives. In the north, the four battalions of the Capital Division moved northwest into the Ky Lo Valley, searching for the headquarters of the 5th Division. The drive ended on the morning of the 25th, when they reached the Phu Yen-Phú Bổn province border without locating either the headquarters or any of the 5th division's rear service units and installations. Meanwhile, the 9th Division sent three battalions into a base area along the Phu Yen-Khánh Hòa province border. But they too were unsuccessful, finding no trace of their target, the PAVN 188th Regiment.

== Aftermath ==
When Chae returned his men to their coastal bases in late August, he reported that they had eliminated over 700 PAVN, mostly from the 95th Regiment, and had captured over 450 weapons, at a cost of 27 Korean dead.

Meanwhile the survivors of the 95th Regiment were escaping into the hills west of Tuy Hoa. Unobserved, the PAVN regrouped and were replenished by the VC. On 9 August they attacked, this time at Hieu Xuong, a district capital adjacent to Tuy Hoa Air Base. After overrunning a revolutionary development headquarters and killing 13 defenders, the PAVN quickly withdrew, taking 57 weapons and large amounts of radio equipment.

For the next three weeks everything was quiet in Tuy Hoa. Then, on the evening of 29 August the 95th attacked again and, occupying hamlets west of the city, dared the Koreans and South Vietnamese to respond in force. Unaccustomed to fighting in built-up areas, the allies reacted slowly. When they did, they chose to risk taking casualties over-using firepower indiscriminately. It took a week to regain the lost hamlets. For the Korean and South Vietnamese forces the cost was high. Eight days later, on 6 September, the enemy returned to the same hamlets. This time the Koreans and South Vietnamese reacted differently. Unwilling to take heavy losses, they brought in artillery and air strikes, destroying both the enemy and the hamlets. Overall results were predictable. Although the PAVN lost over 400 men during the three-week offensive, the fragile pacification program suffered from the attacks. The fighting destroyed 9 hamlets and 3,700 dwellings. Over 20,000 people lost their homes, while civilian casualties, although unrecorded, reportedly were high.

Vietnam veterans such as Chae, and Colonel (Retired) Choi Hee Nam, wrote about Operation Hong Kil Dong in their Vietnam War memoirs.

== See also ==
- Military history of South Korea during the Vietnam War
