= Bình Hòa massacre =

1966 massacre in South Vietnam

Binh Hoa Massacre
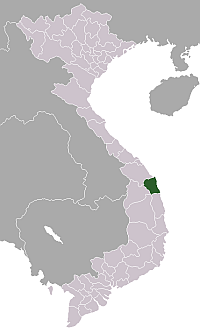
- Quảng Ngãi Province
- Location: Bình Hòa village, Quảng Ngãi Province, South Vietnam
- Date: December 6, 1966; 59 years ago
- Target: Bình Hòa villagers
- Attack type: Massacre
- Deaths: 422–430
- Perpetrator: South Korean forces

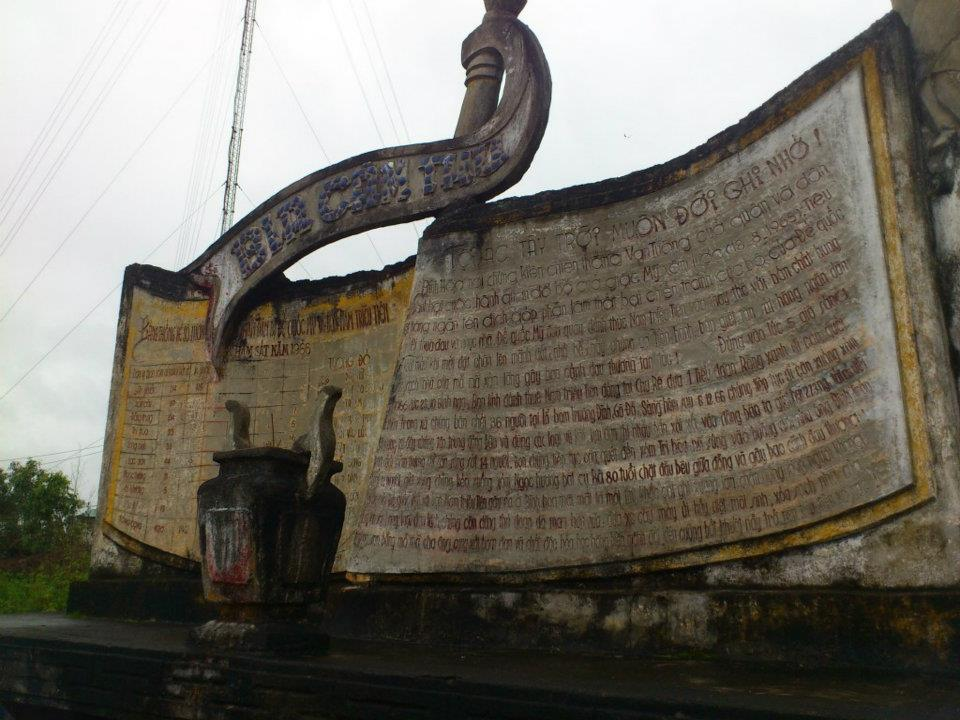
Memorial of Binh Hoa Massacre

The Bình Hòa Massacre, (Vietnamese: thảm sát Bình Hoà, Korean: 빈호아 학살) was a massacre purportedly conducted by South Korean forces between December 3 and December 6, 1966, of 430 unarmed civilians in Bình Hòa village, Quảng Ngãi Province in South Vietnam. In 2000, however, it was reported that a monument within the village, gave the dates of the massacre as October 22, 24, and 26, 1966 and said that 403 people were killed by the South Koreans.

The district was in the operational area of the Blue Dragon Brigade. Most of the victims were children, elderly and women. More than half the victims were women (including seven who were pregnant) and 166 children. The South Korean soldiers burnt down all of the houses and killed hundreds of cows and buffalo after the atrocities. A number of the survivors of the massacre joined the Viet Cong and fought against the United States and its Allies, one of which was South Korea. South Korean forces were also accused of conducting a similar massacre in Binh Tai village within the same year.

The massacre was discussed when British journalist Justin Wintle visited Vietnam in the late 1980s, where the report on the massacre was disclosed to Western media.

== Damage in Quang Ngai Province ==
The estimated number of civilians killed by the ROK military in Quang Ngai Province, including Binh Hoa Commune, during the Vietnam War is as follows:

Distribution of civilian deaths in Quang Ngai province killed by Korean troops
Hyeon	Location	Estimated date of occurrence	Dead	Notes
Binseon Hyun	Binh Duc Sa	October 9, 1966 - March 26, 1967	151	
Binseon Hyun	Binh Hoa Sa	December 3, 1966 - December 6, 1966	430	Place of "Hate Memorial"
Binseon Hyun	Binh An Sa	Early 1967	65	
Binseon Hyun	Binh Quyen Sa	Early 1967	30	
Binseon Hyun	Binh Hoang Sa	Early 1967	30	
Suntin Hyun	Con Lum Village	August 14, 1966	82	
Suntin Hyun	Phuc Binh Village	October 9, 1966	68	
Suntin Hyun	Binh Bac Village	October - November 1966	300	
Suntin Hyun	Dian Nien Village	November 13, 1966	112	
Suntin Hyun	Binh Loc Village	November 13, 1966	40	
Suntin Hyun	Ha Tai Village	November 26, 1996	20	
Suntin Hyun	Son Chau, Son Loc Sa	December 1966	200	
Suntin Hyun	An Binh, Dong Nhan Village	Late 1966	46	
Suntin Hyun	Minh Trung Village	Late 1966	30	
Suntin Hyun	An Tinh, Khanh Van Village	August - September 1967	30	
Suntin Hyun	Khung Loc Village	September 30, 1969	40	
Suntin Hyun	Son Kim Sa	Unknown	100	

== Citizens' Peace Tribunal ==
On April 22-23, 2018, several civil society organizations in South Korea, including the Lawyers for a Democratic Society and the Korea-Vietnam Peace Foundation, held the Citizens' Peace Tribunal for the Investigation of the Truth about the Massacre of Civilians by the Korean Army during the Vietnam War. In this Citizens' Peace Tribunal, Nguyen Thi Thanh, a survivor of the Phong Nhi and Phong Nhat massacres, and Nguyen Thi Thanh (with the same name), a survivor of the Ha My massacre, appeared as plaintiffs and sued the South Korean government for damages. The court of the Citizens' Peace Tribunal accepted their claims, ruled for compensation according to the State Compensation Act, and recommended that the South Korean government conduct a fact-finding investigation. The Citizens' Peace Tribunal is a mock trial and has no legal binding force, but was considered significant in declaring the massacre as a universal human rights issue. The Citizens' Peace Tribunal argued that a special law was needed to eliminate the statute of limitations. In addition, Minbyun is currently in the process of filing a lawsuit requesting the disclosure of the Central Intelligence Agency's data that investigated the Phong Nhi and Phong Nhat massacre in 1968. The National Intelligence Service initially refused to disclose the information on the grounds of "diplomatic disadvantage," but when it received a court order to disclose it, it again refused to disclose the information on the grounds of "personal information."

== In popular culture ==
The Binh Hoa massacre was featured in the Korean documentary The Last Lullaby on the subject of Korean atrocities in South Vietnam.

== See also ==
- List of massacres in Vietnam
- Military history of South Korea during the Vietnam War
- War Remnants Museum
