= Ninh Hòa Base =

Ninh Hòa Base
- Nha Trang, Khánh Hòa Province in Vietnam

Site information
- Operator: Republic of Korea Army (ROK Army); United States Army (US Army)
- Condition: Abandoned

Location
- Shown within Vietnam
- Coordinates: 12°30′16″N 109°08′48″E

Site history
- Built: 1966
- In use: 1966-1973
- Battles/wars: Vietnam War

Garrison information
- Garrison: 9th Infantry Division

Airfield information
- Elevation: 20 feet (6 m) AMSL
Runways
Direction	Length and surface
00/00	1,600 feet (488 m) Asphalt

Ninh Hòa Base is a former Republic of Korea Army base north of Nha Trang in Khánh Hòa Province, Vietnam.

== History ==
The base was originally established in September 1966 by the 9th Infantry Division along Highway 1 approximately 32 kilometres (20 mi) north of Nha Trang. The base remained in use by the 9th Division until their departure from Vietnam in March 1973.

Other units stationed at Ninh Hòa at various times included:

- 48th Assault Helicopter Company, Blue Star

C. Co. 227th Assault Helicopter Bn. 1st Aviation Brigade was also stationed there.

== Current use ==
The base is abandoned and has been turned over to housing and farmland.
