= People's Tribunal on War Crimes by South Korean Troops during the Vietnam War =

Citizen's tribunal organised by South Korean social organizations

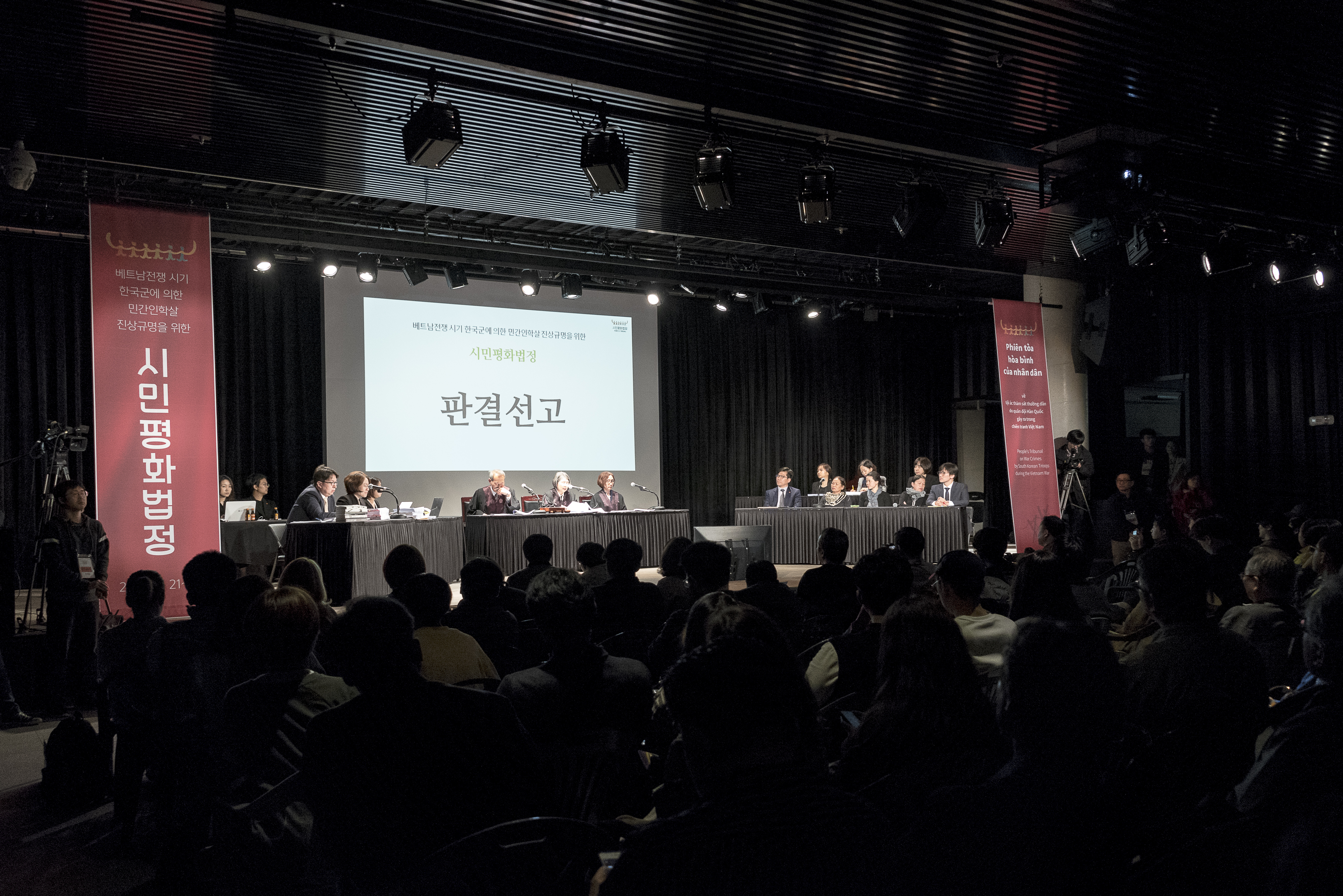
People's Tribunal on Vietnam War War Crimes

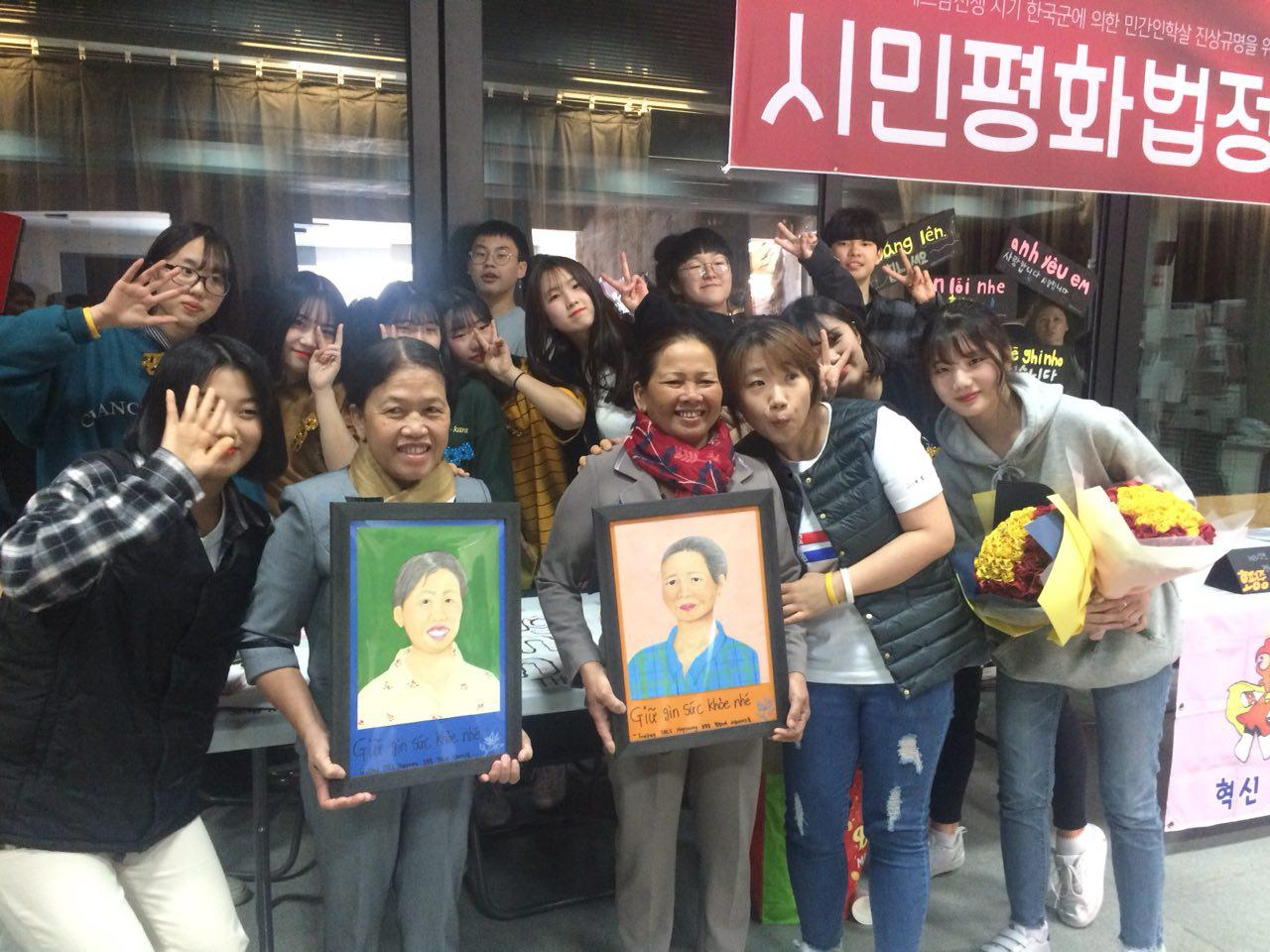
Two victims of massacre with the same name: Nguyen Thi Thanh

The People's Tribunal on War Crimes by South Korean Troops during the Vietnam War (Korean: 베트남 전쟁 시기 한국군에 의한 민간인 학살 진상규명을 위한 시민평화법정) was a citizen's tribunal organised by South Korean social organizations including Minbyun, Korea-Vietnam Peace Foundation, The Korean Council for the Women Drafted for Military Sexual Slavery by Japan during 21–22 April 2018.

The tribunal had investigated and evaluated war crimes by Korean troops during the Vietnam War. Two survivors named Nguyen Thi Thanh, different people with the same name, visited South Korea. One was a victim present at the Phong Nhị and Phong Nhất massacre and the other at the purported Hà My massacre. They held a media conference in the National Assembly of South Korea on 19 April 2018 and asked for an official apology from the South Korean Government. The judges of the tribunal, including former Supreme Court Justice Kim Young-ran, demanded that the South Korean government pay compensation and formally apologize to the two plaintiffs.

== Background ==
In 1968 in the Vietnam War, the Korean 2nd Marine Brigade known as "Cheong-ryong" (Korean: 청룡) was deployed at Hoi An and their TAOR was Quang Nam. At that time, Nguyen Thi Thanh of Pong Nhi was 8 years old. She lost her family in the Phong Nhị and Phong Nhất massacre and suffered a bullet wound on 12 February 1968. The other Nguyen Thi Thanh, victim of the Hà My massacre, lost her family in the massacre.

The Hà My massacre was exposed in the early 2000s by peace activists including Gu Sujeong, a doctor of history, and media organisations including Hankyoreh 21. The exposure prompted much social reflection in South Korea and the movement called "Mianhaeyo, Vietnam."(Korean: 미안해요, 베트남. Sorry, Vietnam.) began at that time. The citizenship movement organizations invited the two victims, Nguyen Thi Tanh of Phong Nhi and Nguyen Tan Lan a survivor of the purported Bình An massacre.

2018 is the 50th memorial year of the alleged massacres in Quang Nam. On November 21, 2017, South Korean social organizations decided to hold a citizen's tribunal for the 50th memorial event and Minbyun took charge of the event. The tribunal followed the Women's International War Crimes Tribunal on Japan's Military Sexual Slavery as its role model. The South Korean Government has offered no comment regarding the tribunal. The defence advocate for the government were designated by the organization committee of the tribunal.

== Tribunal ==
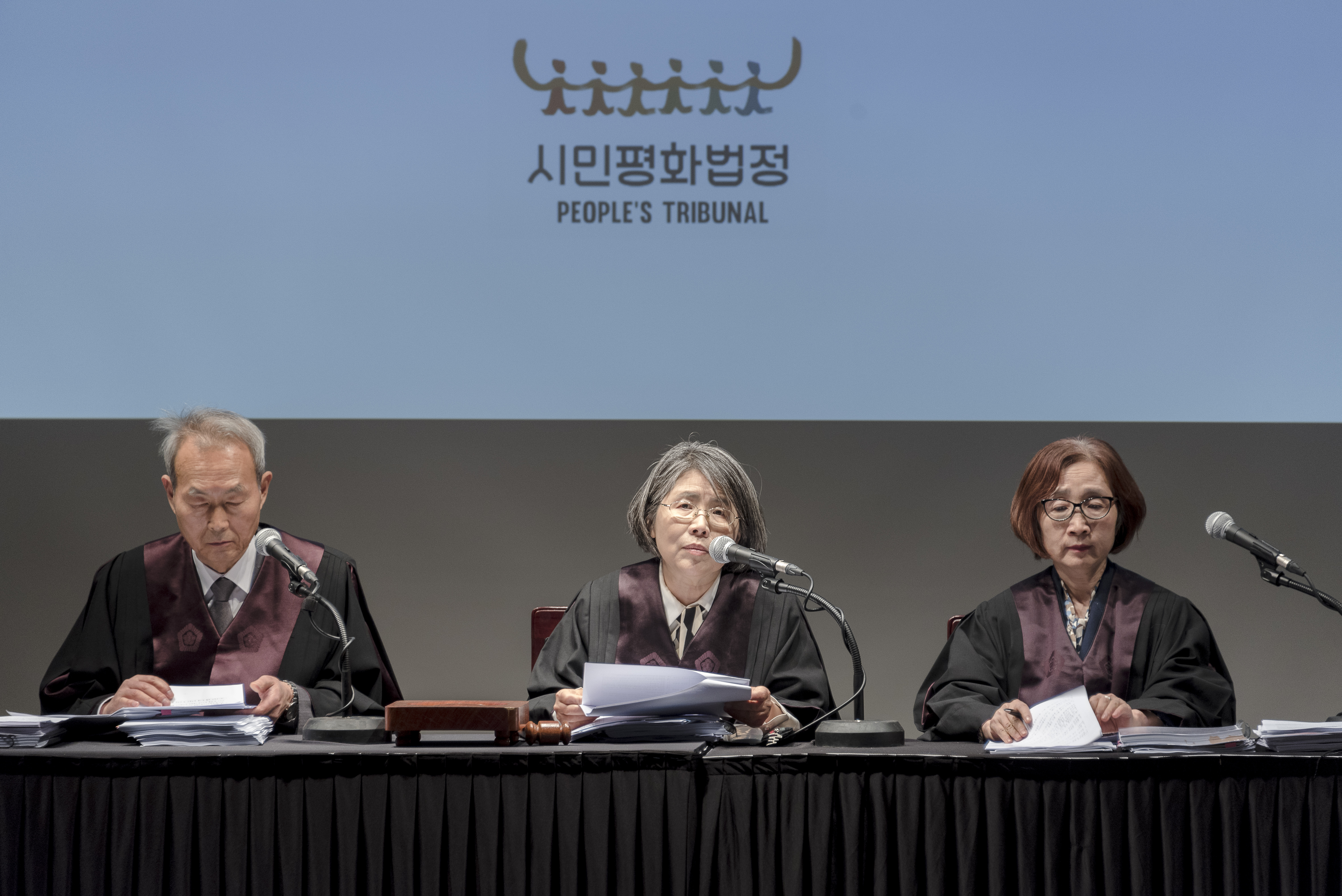
Judges issued a pronouncement of "guilty"

The Tribunal was held as legal remedy for reparation of damages for the two victims against the South Korean Government because the statute of limitations for criminal court already had expired according to South Korean criminal law. The tribunal was held during 21–22 April 2018.

At the investigation, the plaintiffs presented evidence of massacre such as military operations maps and a declassified US Army report, victim interviews, and an interview with a South Korean veteran who testified about a Vietnamese citizen who was killed by Korean troops without trial. The defence offered several arguments; there was no conclusive evidence the perpetrators were Korean troops, and the Vietnam War was abnormal in that troops were unable to separate the enemy from non-combatants as the Viet Cong was not an official army.

On the second day of the tribunal, judges made a pronouncement of "guilty" as below

1. South Korea Government as defendant shall do to plaintiff;

a. to pay the reparation by the article 3 on the law of national reparation.
b. to recognize the legal responsibility and issue the official statement for the recovery of the dignity, honor and rights of plaintiff.

2. The tribunal urges to South Korea Government as defendant to investigate damages including murder, violence, injury, sexual violence and other any cases by Korean troops in Vietnam during 1964 to 1973.

3. South Korea Government as defendant, hereafter, shall exhibit the result of investigation as above at War Memorial of Korea, located 29 Itaewon-ro Yongsan Seoul, which exhibits the participation of Korean troops in Vietnam War as honor and all other official infrastructures or areas to exhibit of the Korean troops participation of Vietnam War.

== Aftermath ==
The tribunal had no binding power as it was a mock tribunal. Also, the statute of limitations had expired. Minbyun and other social organizations of the tribunal prepared a petition making special law to remove the limitation of anti-human rights crimes including war crimes. Minbyun also asked to declassify records regarding the Phong Nhị and Phong Nhất massacre which was investigated by Korean Central Intelligence Agency in 1969.

After the tribunal, both witnesses named Nguyen Thi Thanh visited the victims present at the massacre in Jeju during the Jeju uprising.

== See also ==
- The Korean Council for the Women Drafted for Military Sexual Slavery by Japan
- Russell Tribunal
