= 9th Infantry Division (South Korea) =

Combat formation of the Republic of Korea Army

- 9보병사단
- 9th Infantry Division insignia
- Founded: October 25, 1950; 76 years ago
- Country: South Korea
- Branch: Republic of Korea Army
- Type: Infantry division
- Part of: I Corps
- Garrison/HQ: Goyang, Gyeonggi Province
- Nickname: 백마 (Baek-ma / White Horse)
- Engagements: Korean War; Battle of White Horse; Vietnam War; Operation Hong Kil Dong

Commanders
- Current commander: Maj. Gen. Kim Dong-Ho
- Notable commanders: Maj. Gen. Kim Chon O Maj. Gen. Roh Tae-woo

Insignia
- Identification symbol: White Horse on blue background

- 9th Infantry Division
- Hangul: 구보병사단
- Hanja: 九步兵師團
- RR: Gu bobyeong sadan
- MR: Ku pobyŏng sadan

The 9th Infantry Division (Korean: 9보병사단; Hanja: 九步兵師團), also known as White Horse Division (Korean: 백마부대; Hanja: 白馬師團) after the victory of Battle of White Horse Hill, is an infantry division of the Republic of Korea Army. The unit is composed of the 28th, 29th, 30th infantry brigades, and an artillery brigade.

== History ==
=== Korean War ===
The 9th Division was hastily created in late 1950 during the Korean War and operated in the mountainous terrain of Seoraksan and Odaesan in the northeast, not far from the 38th parallel. The North Korean II Corps cut it off in late 1950 and the Division suffered heavy casualties.

During October 1952, all three 9th Division regiments, the 28th, 29th and 30th (12,000 men) held Hill 395, northwest of Cheorwon, South Korea, known as White Horse Hill. The Division prepared for a Chinese assault. A captured North Korean officer who knew of the impending attack and did not want to be in the fight betrayed his comrades and told the ROKs about it. Many support units helped the 9th Division, but at the end of the day, it was the 9th Division pitted squarely against the Chinese 38th Army. The 9th Division was renamed after the Battle of White Horse Hill and is known as the White Horse Division.

Three 9th Division men received the US Distinguished Service Cross (DSC) for their service in the Battle of White Horse Mountain, near Chatkol. The DSC is the second highest military decoration of the United States Army, awarded for extreme gallantry and risk of life in combat with an armed enemy force. The ROK recipients were Major General Kim Chon O, 9th Division; 2nd Lt. Chung Nak Koo, 11th Co., 28th Regiment; and Sergeant Kim Man Su, 9th Co., 29th Regiment.

=== Vietnam War ===
The 9th Division arrived in Vietnam between 5 September and 8 October 1966 and was positioned in the Ninh Hòa District at the junction of Route 1 and Route 21. The 28th Regiment was stationed in the Tuy Hòa area, the 29th Regiment at the division headquarters at Ninh Hòa Base and the 30th Regiment on the mainland side to protect Cam Ranh Bay. With these three areas under control, the 9th Division could control Route 1 and the population along that main road all the way from Tuy Hoa down to Phan Rang, from Tuy Hòa north to Qui Nhơn, and as far north of that city as the foothills of the mountains in southern Bình Định Province.

Significant operations and actions involving the Division include:

- Operation Ma Doo I (마두1호 작전): an operation by the 28th Regiment in Phú Yên Province from 21 January to 7 February 1967 results in ROK claims of 160 People's Army of Vietnam (PAVN) killed and 167 weapons captured
- Operation Baek Ma I (백마1호 작전): a search and destroy operation in Khánh Hòa Province by the 29th and 30th Regiments from 29 to 31 January 1967 results in ROK claims of 390 PAVN killed and 302 weapons captured for no friendly losses
- Operation Oh Jak Kyo (오작교 작전): to link up the Division's tactical area of responsibility with the Capital Division in Phú Yên Province from 8 March to 18 April 1967 results in ROK claims of 831 Vietcong (VC) killed and 659 weapons captured for the loss of 23 ROK
- Operation Hong Kil Dong (홍길동 작전): with the Capital Division in Tuy Hòa Province from 9 July to 21 August 1967, ROK claiming 638 PAVN killed for the loss of 26 ROK. 98 crew-served and 359 individual weapons were captured

==== Commanders during Vietnam War ====
- Maj. Gen. Yi So-dong
- Maj. Gen.Cho Chun-sung

==== Order of battle during Vietnam War ====
- 9th Infantry Division
  - Armored Company
  - Direct Control Company
  - Reconnaissance Company
  - Engineering Battalion
  - 30th Field Artillery Battalion
  - 51st Field Artillery Battalion
  - 52nd Field Artillery Battalion
  - 966th Field Artillery Battalion
  - 28th Infantry Regiment
  - 29th Infantry Regiment (Commanded by future ROK President Chun Doo-hwan, 1970-71.)
  - 30th Infantry Regiment

==== Unit statistics for the Vietnam War ====
Start Date	End Date	Deployed			Combat			KIA			WIA		
Start Date	End Date	Officer	Non-officer	Total	Large	Small	Total	Officer	Non-officer	Total	Officer	Non-officer	Total
September 22, 1966	March 11, 1973	6,445	98,891	105,336	478	211,236	211,714	78	1,250	1,328	160	2,250	2,410

=== Coup d'état of December Twelfth ===
In 1979, the 9th Division was involved in the Coup d'état of December Twelfth, when its commander, Major General Roh Tae-Woo led the unit to Seoul without orders, away from its normal position near the DMZ, and supported the take-over of the South Korean government by Lt. General Chun Doo Hwan.

== Current order of battle ==
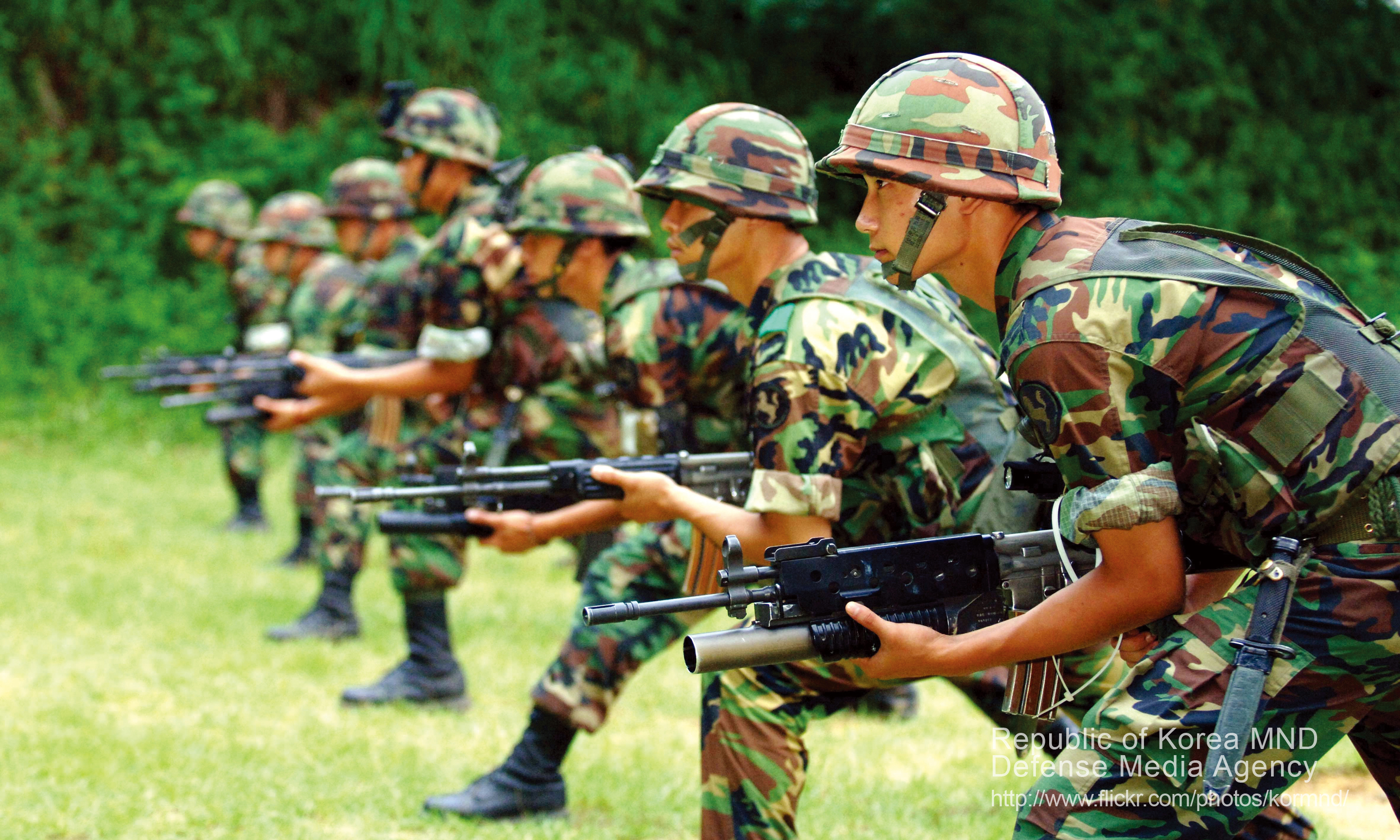
Soldiers of the 9th Infantry Division during combat training.

- Headquarters:
  - Headquarters Company
  - Intelligence Company
  - Air Defense Company
  - Reconnaissance Battalion
  - Engineer Battalion
  - Armored Battalion
  - Signal Battalion
  - Support Battalion
  - Military Police Battalion
  - Medical Battalion
  - Chemical Battalion
- 28th Infantry Brigade (equipped with K808 APCs)
- 29th Infantry Brigade (equipped with K808 APCs)
- 30th Infantry Brigade (equipped with K808 APCs)
- Artillery Brigade (equipped with K9 SPHs)

== See also ==
- Republic of Korea Armed Forces
- Republic of Korea Army
- Korean War
- Battle of White Horse
- Vietnam War
- Capital Mechanized Infantry Division
- 2nd Marine Brigade
