= Chae Myung-shin =

South Korean general (1926–2013)

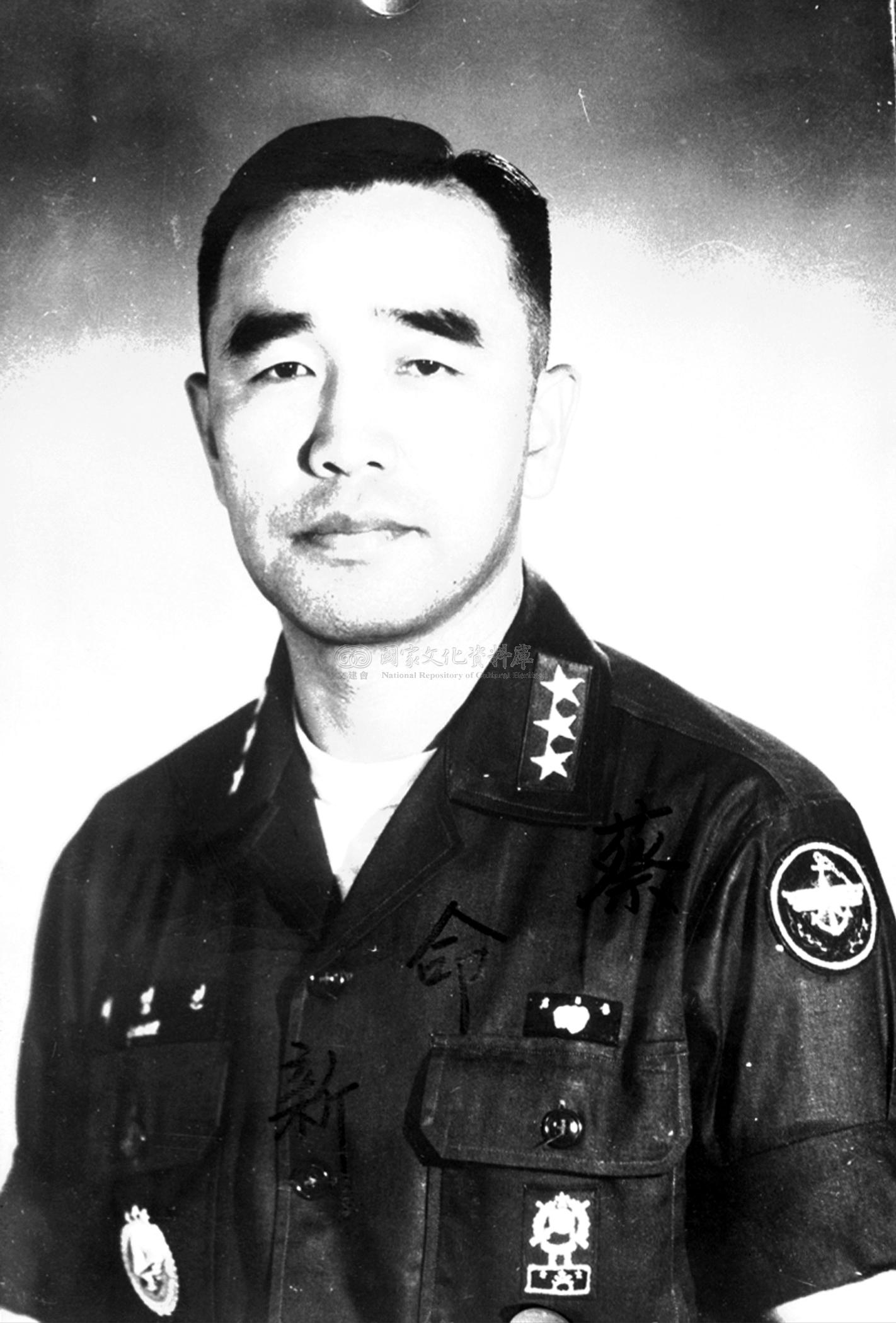
- Chae in Saigon, South Vietnam in 1969
- Born: 27 November 1926; Koksan County, Kōkai Province, Korea, Empire of Japan
- Died: 25 November 2013 (aged 86); Seoul, South Korea
- Military career
- Allegiance: South Korea
- Branch: Republic of Korea Army
- Service years: 1948–1972
- Rank: Lieutenant general
- Commands: Baekgol Unit; 38th Infantry Division; 5th Infantry Division; Capital Division; Republic of Korea Forces Vietnam; Second Army
- Conflicts: Jeju uprising Korean War; Vietnam War
- Awards: Order of Military Merit; Legion of Merit; See below

Korean name
- Hangul: 채명신
- Hanja: 蔡命新
- RR: Chae Myeongsin
- MR: Ch'ae Myŏngsin

Chae Myung-shin (Korean: 채명신; Hanja: 蔡命新; 27 November 1926 – 25 November 2013) was a South Korean army officer who was the first commander of South Korean forces in the Vietnam War, from 1965 to 1969. Born in present-day North Korea, he moved south in 1947, led the Baekgol guerrilla unit behind enemy lines during the Korean War, and took part in Park Chung Hee's May 16 coup of 1961. He was also the founding president of the Korean Taekwondo Association.

In Vietnam, Chae insisted that Korean troops remain under Korean command, and he reached an informal understanding with the American commander William Westmoreland under which Korean forces followed US requests without a formal transfer of control. His command was later criticised over killings of civilians by Korean troops, including the Phong Nhị and Phong Nhất massacre of 1968, which he attributed to the Viet Cong. He retired as a lieutenant general in 1972 after opposing Park's Yushin Constitution, and he then served as ambassador to Sweden, Greece and Brazil.

== Early life ==
Chae was born on 27 November 1926 in Koksan County, Hwanghae Province. His father was an anti-Japanese activist who was imprisoned and died in December 1945 from the effects of torture, and his mother was a devout Christian. He studied at the Gyeongseong Institute of Humanities and the Pyongyang Teachers' School. After the liberation of Korea in 1945, he briefly taught at an elementary school in Jinnampo.

Under the Soviet occupation of the north, Chae became disillusioned with communism after a conversation with a Soviet captain and after seeing that officers and soldiers ate different meals. In February 1946, he met Kim Il Sung, who invited him to work with him, but Chae declined. In 1947, he moved alone to the south and settled in Seoul.

== Military career ==
Chae gave up his plan to become a pastor and joined the army, entering the Korea Constabulary Officers' School, the forerunner of the Korea Military Academy, in its fifth class. He was commissioned as a second lieutenant in 1948 and served as a platoon leader in the 9th Regiment on Jeju Island during the Jeju uprising. According to the researcher Ku Su-jeong, he took part in sweep operations against suspected communists there. In 1949, he commanded an infantry company in the fighting at Songak Mountain near the 38th parallel, and in November of that year he was sent to suppress communist guerrillas in the Taebaek Mountains.

=== Korean War ===
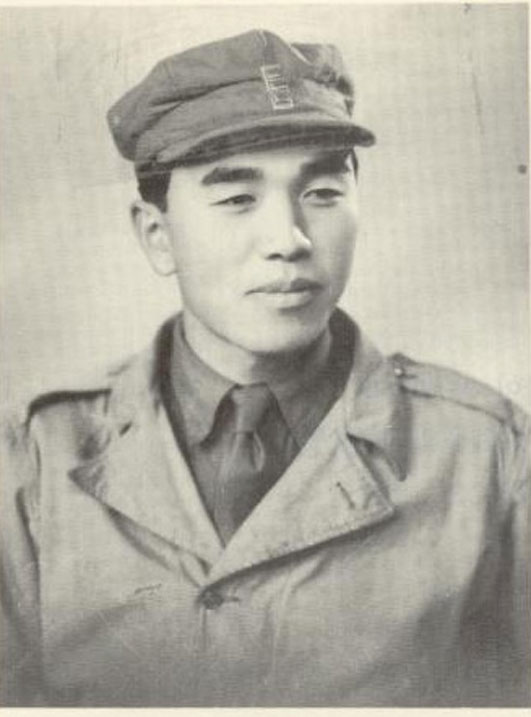
Chae as a captain

During the Korean War, Chae served as a platoon leader, company commander and battalion commander, and as a battalion commander he led the fighting at Jungnyeong Pass. He commanded the Baekgol ("Skeleton") Unit, a guerrilla force that operated behind North Korean lines. His forces captured the North Korean guerrilla commander Kil Won-pal, an associate of Kim Il Sung, and he became known as the "phoenix of the battlefield". He later commanded a battalion of the 21st Regiment of the 8th Division and the 11th Regiment. In 1951, he met Park Chung Hee in Gangneung, when Chae was a lieutenant colonel and Park a colonel. In 1953, he graduated from the United States Army Infantry School.

=== Post-war career and the 1961 coup ===
After the war, Chae was operations officer of the III Corps and chief of staff of the 2nd Training Centre at Nonsan, where he tackled corruption among the staff. He was later operations officer of the First Army and commanded the 38th Infantry Division and the 5th Infantry Division.

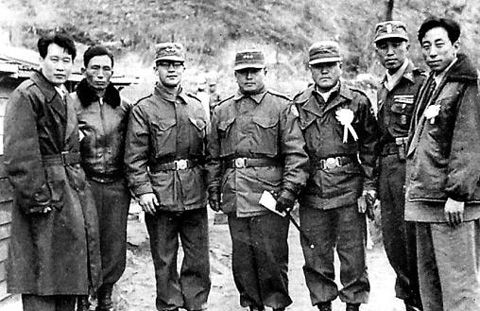
Members of the May 16 coup, with Chae second from right and Park Chung Hee second from left

Chae took part in Park's coup of 16 May 1961 as commander of the 5th Division, and he sent a regiment to Seoul. The Korea JoongAng Daily described him as one of the five key members of the coup, and he became a member of the Military Revolutionary Committee. However, the philosopher Kim Dong-gil wrote that Chae had opposed the involvement of soldiers in politics and did not join the coup at first, but that he later worked to prevent chaos by persuading the general Lee Han-lim and the American commander Carter B. Magruder. Under the military government, Chae became chairman of the inspection committee of the Supreme Council for National Reconstruction. In 1962, he co-founded the Korean Taekwondo Association with Kim Un-yong and became its first president.

=== Vietnam War ===
==== Command arrangement ====
Chae initially opposed sending South Korean combat troops to Vietnam, and he recommended the general Lee Byung-hyung for the command instead of himself. Park nevertheless persuaded him to take the command. In 1965, Chae arrived in South Vietnam during the Vietnam War as a major general and commander of the Capital Division, which deployed with the 2nd Marine Brigade in three increments between 29 September and 29 October 1965. By the end of 1965, he commanded the Korean corps, and in August 1966 he set up a headquarters in Saigon to command all Korean forces in Vietnam. He was promoted to lieutenant general in 1966.

On 2 July 1965, William Westmoreland, the commander of the Military Assistance Command, Vietnam (MACV), proposed that MACV should exercise operational control over Korean units. On 23 October, Chae replied that he could not sign such an arrangement without consulting his government, though he would follow its procedures in the meantime. Westmoreland later reported that a formal agreement would be politically embarrassing for the Koreans. Chae instead accepted de facto operational control by American commanders, and he and Lieutenant General Stanley R. Larsen understood that American requests would be treated as orders. The Free World Military Assistance Policy Council remained the only formal body for coordinating the allied forces.

==== Operations and reputation ====
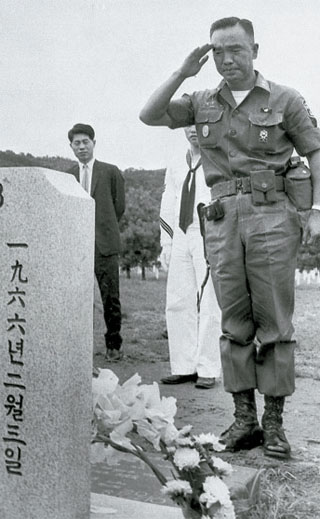
Chae paying tribute to fallen soldiers at Seoul National Cemetery in 1966

Westmoreland praised the high morale, professional competence and aggressiveness of Korean soldiers. American evaluations later became more critical, and some US commanders complained that Korean operations were slow and inflexible, while others found them highly efficient. General Creighton Abrams judged that the Koreans probably outperformed other allied forces in professional terms, but that they were less flexible in dealing with the population. The broadcaster YTN later credited him with efforts to protect civilians in Vietnam.

==== Phong Nhị and Phong Nhất ====
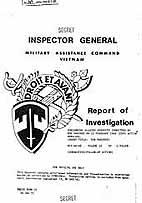
Report of the US Army Inspector General's office on the Phong Nhị and Phong Nhất massacre

On 12 February 1968, South Korean marines were accused of killing civilians in the villages of Phong Nhị and Phong Nhất in Quảng Nam province, in what became known as the Phong Nhị and Phong Nhất massacre. Westmoreland sent Chae a preliminary copy of the American investigation and asked for an urgent response. In a cable, Chae replied that the Viet Cong had often operated in the area in camouflaged uniforms, and he concluded that the massacre had been carried out by the communists. American investigators considered his account to be at odds with the evidence from US Marines, South Vietnamese troops and civilians, and an American report found some probability that a war crime had been committed. In a 2000 interview, Chae acknowledged that the Americans had requested investigations several times and that the Korean headquarters had conducted its own inquiry. In 2023, a Seoul court ordered the South Korean government to pay compensation to a survivor of the massacre.

=== Later military career ===
Chae left Vietnam in 1969 and became commander of the Second Army. He received the US Legion of Merit from President Richard Nixon. Although he had been a close aide of Park, Chae opposed Park's plans to extend his rule. Most accounts state that his opposition to the Yushin Constitution of 1972 cost him promotion to full general, though YTN linked his retirement to his opposition to the constitutional amendment of 1969 that allowed Park a third term. He retired as a lieutenant general in 1972.

== Diplomatic career and later life ==
After his retirement, Chae served as ambassador to Sweden from 1972, to Greece from 1973 and to Brazil from 1977. Kim Dong-gil interpreted the posting to Sweden as Park's way of sending an able soldier far from Seoul. In later life, Chae was honorary president of the Korea Overseas Veterans Association and president of the Vietnam War veterans' association, and he gave lectures and worked for the welfare of veterans. He published his memoirs in 1994 and a second memoir, on the Vietnam War, in 2006.

== Death ==
Chae died of gallbladder cancer on 25 November 2013. He had asked to be buried with the soldiers who died in Vietnam, saying that he had become a general only because of the enlisted men who had given their lives. The Ministry of National Defense and the cemetery initially objected, citing the lack of precedent, but the presidential office approved the request after his wife wrote to it. On 28 November, after an Army funeral led by the Army chief of staff, he was buried in a plot of 3.3 square metres (36 sq ft) in the enlisted soldiers' section of Seoul National Cemetery, instead of the generals' section. He was the first general to be buried among the enlisted dead there.

== Personal life ==
Chae married Moon Jeong-in, who came from a prominent family in Yeongdeok, North Gyeongsang Province. Her brother Moon Tae-joon served as minister of health and social affairs. The couple had one son and two daughters. Chae was a Protestant and an elder of his church.

== Honours and awards ==
=== Domestic ===
- Order of Military Merit (무공훈장) (1st Class - Taegeuk Cordon (태극)) (Note: Sometimes spelt Taeguk)
- Order of Military Merit (무공훈장) (2nd Class - Eulji Cordon (을지)) (Note: Sometimes spelt Ulchi) (twice)
- Order of Military Merit (무공훈장) (3rd Class - Chungmu Cordon (충무)) (three times)
- Order of Military Merit (무공훈장) (4th Class - Hwarang Cordon (화랑))
- Order of National Security Merit, Gukseon Medal
- Defence Commendation (Bangwi Pojang)
- In June 2026, he was named the "Patriotic Figure of the Month" at a ceremony at the War Memorial of Korea.

=== Foreign ===
- Legion of Merit (LOM) (United States, 1969)
- Knight Grand Cross of the Order of the Crown of Thailand (Thailand)

== Works ==
- Chae, Myung-shin (1994). 사선을 넘고 넘어: 채명신 회고록 [Across the Lines of Death: The Memoirs of Chae Myung-shin] (in Korean). Seoul: Maeil Business Newspaper.
- Chae, Myung-shin (2006). 베트남전쟁과 나 [The Vietnam War and I] (in Korean). Seoul: Palbokwon.

== See also ==
- Republic of Korea Armed Forces
- South Korea in the Vietnam War
