= Phong Nhị and Phong Nhất massacre =

1968 killing of Vietnamese villagers reportedly by South Korean marines

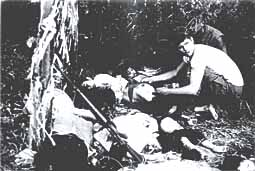
- U.S. Marines recovered victims' bodies in Phong Nhị and Phong Nhat villages on 12 February 1968
- Location: Phong Nhị and Phong Nhất villages, Go Noi Island, Dien Trung Dien Phong, Điện Bàn District, Quảng Nam Province, South Vietnam, now Danang, Vietnam
- Date: February 12, 1968; 58 years ago
- Target: Villagers
- Attack type: Massacre
- Deaths: 69–79
- Perpetrators: USMC eyewitness and survivors report: South Korean marines; ROK claims: Viet Cong dressed as South Korean marines

The Phong Nhị and Phong Nhất massacre (Korean: 퐁니·퐁넛 양민학살 사건, Vietnamese: Thảm sát Phong Nhất và Phong Nhị) was a massacre of unarmed civilians in the villages of Phong Nhị and Phong Nhất, Điện Bàn District of Quảng Nam Province in South Vietnam reported to have been conducted by the 2nd Marine Brigade of the Republic of Korea Marines (ROKMC) during the Vietnam War on 12 February 1968.

== Events ==
At the time the massacre occurred, the Phong Nhị villagers had had a close relationship with the U.S. Marines as the villagers formed a part of the Combined Action Program (CAP) and the village men were enlisted as South Vietnamese soldiers.

At about 10:00 members of the ROKMC 1st Company, 1st Battalion, 2nd Marine Brigade passed the CAP Delta-2 team (15.91°N 108.24°E). At 10:30 the ROKMC company moved west towards Phong Nhị and Phong Nhất (15.91°N 108.22°E) and began taking fire from Phong Nhất. At about 11:00 an LVTP-5 supporting the ROKMC unit on Highway 1 was hit by a command-detonated mine and disabled. A U.S. Marine operating with the 1st Company believed that the mine had been triggered from Phong Nhất.

The 1st Company swept through Phong Nhị and Phong Nhất before returning to Phong Nhi. At 13:00 shooting was heard and smoke seen coming from Phong Nhị. At about 13:30 a Popular Force soldier from CAP Delta-2 brought in two young boys who had been shot and a woman who had been stabbed.

After 13:30 the CAP Delta-2 members attempted unsuccessfully to contact the U.S. liaison officer at ROK 2nd Marine Brigade headquarters. The 2nd Marine Brigade G-3 officer advised the CAP Delta-2 team that ROK Marines were not in the Phong Nhị area. The CAP Delta-2 team requested mortar fire into the Phong Nhị area but this request was denied.

At about 15:00 a patrol from CAP Delta-2 moved into Phong Nhị and evacuated the survivors. A total of 69 civilians were found dead in three main groups in Phong Nhị and Phong Nhất.

The operation by the ROKMC was not approved by the District Chief. III Marine Amphibious Force (III MAF) situation reports for the 2nd Marine Brigade confirmed that the 1st Company was in the area and that they received small arms fire at 11:05 and 15:30 resulting in one Marine wounded. On 16 February 1968 the ROKMC Executive Officer visited the District Chief to express regret for the incident and left 30 bags of rice for the villagers at the District headquarters.

== Investigation ==
Eyewitness testimony from both the members of CAP Delta-2 and survivors at the hospital accusing ROK forces of responsibility prompted calls for a war-crime investigation from CAP commanders and COMUSMACV, both making direct demands that ROK commander Lieutenant general Chae Myung-shin investigate. On 16 April 1968 the III MAF reported on the incident to Military Assistance Command, Vietnam (MACV). A total of five other hamlet massacres were investigated as well, at Hoang Chau hamlet, Phuoc My, Thanh Phu and Hoa Phon. On 29 April 1968, MACV sent the report to the Chae.

On 4 June 1968, Chae advised MACV that he had investigated the incident and stated that ROKMC forces had never been in Phong Nhị and that operations were limited to Phong Nhất. Chae suggested that the massacre had been conducted by Vietcong (VC) forces disguised in Korean-style camouflage uniforms in order to discredit the Korean forces. Chae stated that there were numerous cases in which the VC used the duck hunter camouflage pattern worn by the ROKMC to commit misdeeds in order to incite unpopular opinion as support for his claim. Chae also denied that the ROKMC Executive Officer had apologized for the massacre and claimed that the bags of rice were not offered as an apology, but were part of normal refugee assistance.

VC secret reports discuss this massacre, clearly blaming the Korean forces for conducting this massacre and discussed reprisals to rally villagers to their cause and away from GVN/USMC pacification efforts.

== Aftermath ==
The massacre negatively impacted ongoing pacification efforts in the region as it became widely known. Transferring the ROKMC to the populated Da Nang sector of I Corps from an unpopulated sector set back considerable efforts invested in winning support and worsened relations with local residents. This massacre alongside the Hà My massacre undermined ongoing efforts at pacification.

South Vietnamese and US commanders from the region had a negative appraisal of Koreans with General Rathvon M. Tompkins and General Robert E. Cushman Jr. being quite negative about the Koreans being transferred to the sector, as they were regarded as generally uncooperative and unwilling to engage in security while committing atrocities. These atrocities were reported by ARVN/US commanders and sent down to Saigon.

In 1969, one of the victims' families made a petition to the President of South Vietnam's Parliament for compensation. The local South Vietnamese civilians were particularly disturbed that the massacre was perpetrated by ROK forces against villagers who had family members in ARVN forces.

On 11 November 2000, Chae conceded that Chief of Staff of the United States Army General William Westmoreland demanded the investigation several times. Chae still claimed that the two villages were not in the route of the ROKMC and repeatedly continued to blame the VC who allegedly wore the South Korean marine uniforms.

== Public awareness and legal action in South Korea ==
In 1999, Koo Su-jeong first brought the issue of civilian massacres by South Korean troops in Vietnam to public attention. On June 1, 2000, photos of the massacre were declassified by the US government, and journalist Ko Gyeong-tae was the first to report them in South Korea. In 2017, The Korean Council for the Women Drafted for Military Sexual Slavery by Japan and other human rights and women’s organizations launched a series of one-person protests in front of the Vietnamese Embassy in South Korea to apologize to the victims. Sculptors Kim Seo-kyung and Kim Eun-sung, known for the Statue of Peace, built a similar commemorative statue.

In 2018, Nguyen Thi Thanh, a survivor of the Phong Nhi massacre, and Nguyen Thi Thanh, a survivor of the Hà My massacre, demanded an official apology from the South Korean government in the People's Tribunal on War Crimes by South Korean Troops during the Vietnam War. In 2023, the former won a case in South Korea's district court, which held the South Korean government accountable for the massacre and ordered the government to pay compensation. The South Korean government appealed the case while the court of appeals upheld the lower court's ruling in 2025. However, the Ministry of National Defense appealed to the Supreme Court, and the case is currently pending.

== Photos ==
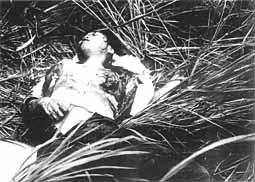
A dying 21-year-old woman with her breasts cut out. U.S. Marines transported her to the hospital, but she died soon after

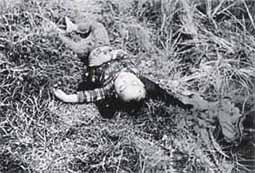
A child killed during the Phong Nhi and Phong Nhat massacre

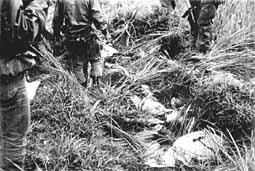
Children's bodies in a ditch

== See also ==
- War Remnants Museum
- South Korea in the Vietnam War
- People's Tribunal on War Crimes by South Korean Troops during the Vietnam War
