= Minbyun =

South Korean Lawyer Organization

- Lawyers for a Democratic Society
- Formation: 25 May 1988
- Type: Non-profit organization
- Headquarters: Seocho District, Seoul
- President: Yun Bok-nam
- Website: minbyun.org

Korean name
- Hangul: 민주사회를 위한 변호사모임
- Hanja: 民主社會를 爲한 辯護士모임
- RR: Minju sahoereul wihan byeonhosa moim
- MR: Minju sahoerŭl wihan pyŏnhosa moim

Short name
- Hangul: 민변
- Hanja: 民辯
- RR: Minbyeon
- MR: Minbyŏn

Minbyun (Korean: 민변; full name 민주사회를 위한 변호사모임) is a progressive South Korean social organization of lawyers. The organization aims to resolve social inequality in South Korean society through judicial and legislative means. Minbyun is headquartered in Seocho District, Seoul; it has 8 regional branches throughout South Korea and 16 committees which specialize in various fields of human rights.

The name Minbyun is the abbreviation of Minju Sahoereul Wihan Byeonhosa Moim (민주사회를 위한 변호사모임), which has been translated as "Lawyers for a Democratic Society" in English. Minbyun was founded on May 25, 1988, one year after the collapse of Chun Doo-Hwan's military regime. Member lawyers have engaged in activities for preserving human rights and democracy. Many famous human rights attorneys have been members, and some of them have grown into popular politicians including Roh Moo-hyun, the 16th president of South Korea, Park Won-soon, 35th·36th·37th Mayor of Seoul, Moon Jae-in, 19th President of South Korea and Lee Jae-myung, 21st President of South Korea
