= Bình An/Tây Vinh massacre =

1966 South Korean war crime during the Vietnam War

- Part of The Vietnam War
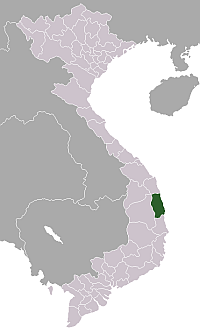
- Location: Tây Sơn District of Bình Định Province, South Vietnam
- Date: February 12, 1966 – March 17, 1966
- Target: Tay Vinh villagers
- Attack type: Massacre
- Deaths: 1,004-1,200
- Perpetrator: ROK Capital Division

The Bình An/Tây Vinh massacre (Korean: 타이빈 양민 학살 사건) was an alleged series of massacres committed by the Capital Mechanized Infantry Division of the South Korean Army between February 12, 1966 and March 17, 1966 in the village of Go Dai and other areas in the rural communes of Bình An and Tây Vinh of Tây Sơn District, Bình Định Province in South Vietnam.

The massacre was reported to have occurred over the course of three weeks, in which 1,004 to 1,200 civilians were allegedly massacred; primarily women, children, elderly men, and infants. The massacres were supposedly conducted as part of Operation Maeng Ho, which formed a part of Operation Masher, and the civilian deaths were reported as "enemy KIA".

Documents and testimonies on the massacre was internally investigated, but not publicly disclosed until the news of the massacre and its outcome was uncovered by Korean graduate student Ku Su-Jeong and reported in the Korean media. The Asian Human Rights Commission had reported on the massacre and sent a letter to then President of South Korea Kim Dae-jung for justice on the matter, with Kim Dae-jung expressing regret for war-time atrocities on a state visit to Vietnam.

== Reporting ==
The Associated Press (AP) investigated allegations of the Bình An/Tây Vinh massacre in April 2000, and stated that it "was unable to independently confirm [the Vietnamese victims'] claims", writing that "[n]either the Pentagon nor the South Korean Defense Ministry would comment on the allegations or offer independent confirmation". The AP further reported that “[a]n additional 653 civilians were allegedly killed the same year by South Korean troops in neighboring Quang Ngai and Phu Yen provinces, according to provincial and local officials interviewed by the AP on a trip the government took two months to approve…[t]he AP was unable to search for documents that would back up the officials' allegations".

A Reuters story from earlier in January 2000 stated that "[t]hree local officials, including one who said he survived the alleged killings, spoke at length about the events in Binh Dinh. The officials, who declined to be identified, said that in early 1966, Korean troops entered what was then the Binh An commune, a collection of villages within Tay Son district that they believed was a Viet Cong stronghold. The Koreans were intent on flushing out opposing forces, but civilians bore the brunt of their actions, the officials said. An official at Tay Son's Communist Party history unit said the attacks began in early 1966 and culminated in a massacre of 380 people on Feb. 26, 1966, at a place called Go Dai." and that "A People's Committee official in Tay Son district also confirmed the details, saying 1,200 people were killed. A government official in Hanoi said central authorities had later investigated what happened at Binh Dinh and compiled detailed reports, which showed more than 1,000 people were killed during the period, about 380 of them at Go Dai. However, when asked for comment and to confirm the alleged killings, Vietnam's foreign ministry said it did not want to dwell on the matter. "South Korean troops committed crimes against Vietnamese people. With humanitarian and peaceful neighbourly traditions, it is Vietnam's policy to close the past..." the ministry said in a statement in response to questions."

A series of reports by the Tuổi Trẻ newspaper chronicled life after the massacre in this village, chronicling the life of village massacre survivors. Survivors of the massacre have also testified at the Korean Peace Museum in Seoul, although these massacres were denied by some Korean veterans serving in South Vietnam.

== See also ==
- Military history of South Korea during the Vietnam War
- War Remnants Museum
