= Hà My massacre =

1968 killing of Vietnamese villagers by South Korean marines during the Vietnam War

Ha My massacre
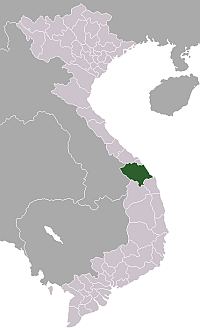
- Quảng Nam Province
- Location: Hà My village, Quảng Nam, South Vietnam
- Date: February 25, 1968; 58 years ago
- Target: Ha My villagers
- Attack type: Massacre
- Deaths: 135
- Perpetrator: ROK Marines

The Hà My Massacre was a massacre purportedly conducted by the South Korean Marines on 25 February 1968 of unarmed civilians in Hà My village, Điện Dương commune, Điện Bàn District, Quảng Nam Province in South Vietnam.

== Description ==
Prior to the massacre, Korean forces had visited the village before but were not aggressive or hostile. The massacre was purportedly conducted by the 2nd Marine Division. One survivor's testimony was that Korean forces had entered the village, ordered her family into an underground shelter and threw grenades, killing and wounding members of her family, and even targeted infants.

According to South Korean anthropologist Heonik Kwon, it was reportedly conducted in retaliation for Vietcong (VC) mortar fire on a ROK Marine Artillery Battery firebase that killed a South Korean Marine artillery Daewi (Captain), a Sangsa (First Sergeant) and four conscripts. The attack was preceded by two hours of shelling by 155 mm artillery, during which two helicopters were circling overhead the village and machine-gunning those that tried to escape. Later helicopters and trucks transported almost 200 Marines to the village who killed many more civilians at close quarters. The victims were 135 women, children and elders from the thirty households. After the massacre, the Marines bulldozed a shallow grave and buried the victims' bodies en masse and later used napalm bombs from helicopters in an attempt to destroy any evidence. Kwon states that this assault against the corpses and graves is remembered as the most inhumane aspect of the incident.

Korean forces returned to the village the next day and had flattened the village.

The region surrounding the village became a hotbed for VC activity, remaining resistant to Korean forces in the region until they were relegated to guarding bases later that year and until their departure in 1973. The commune would later earn the designation as a Hero District of the People's Armed Forces of the PAVN.

In December 2000, a memorial for the 135 victims was founded in Hà My village.

In Vietnam, after the Doimoi policy, massacre monuments (memorial monuments, hatred monuments) during the Vietnam War have been erected in various places [6].

In September 1999, a retired soldier of the South Korean Army's Blue Dragon Unit visited Hami Village and offered a donation of $25,000 in monument funds. The monument made of marble was completed in November 2000.

The inscription is engraved with the following:

Soldiers of the Blue Dragon Unit killed 135 people.

This place is stained with blood, sand and bones are mixed,

The house was burned, and an ant gnawed on the burned corpse,

The smell of blood was full.

When the explosion blew through, it was even more miserable.

In the destroyed house, the elderly mother and father died while moaning,

The children were frightened by fear.

The person who escaped was shot and died,

The child crawled to his dead mother and sucked his milk.

What's worse is trampling the body with a tank.

(...)

The past battlefield has already eased the pain,

The Korean revisited this place, acknowledged the resentful past, and apologized.

And on top of forgiveness, he built this stone monument.

(Full text deletion by Korea)

However, veterans who participated in the completion ceremony in 2000 sent the inscription on the massacre engraved by the villagers to the Korean side and requested correction and deletion through the Korean government. The villagers of Hami said, "It is unacceptable to interfere with the contents of the inscription. This is the past and the truth in our history," he rejected the request.

The South Korean government pressured the Vietnamese government through the Korean embassy in Hanoi, and the Vietnamese government instructed local governments to persuade the villagers. In addition, he invited local village executives to Korea to entertain them, and he was appeased.

The villagers of Hami continued to resist, but decided to delete the full text, saying, "It is better not to record history than to distort and record it," and put a lotus painting stone tablet on the inscription. The villagers of Hami said, "That's what it's about to cover history."

== See also ==
- War Remnants Museum
- Military history of South Korea during the Vietnam War
- People's Tribunal on War Crimes by South Korean Troops during the Vietnam War
